= Ashgabat =

Capital and largest city of Turkmenistan

Ashgabat Aşgabat Aşgabat şäheri
- Capital city
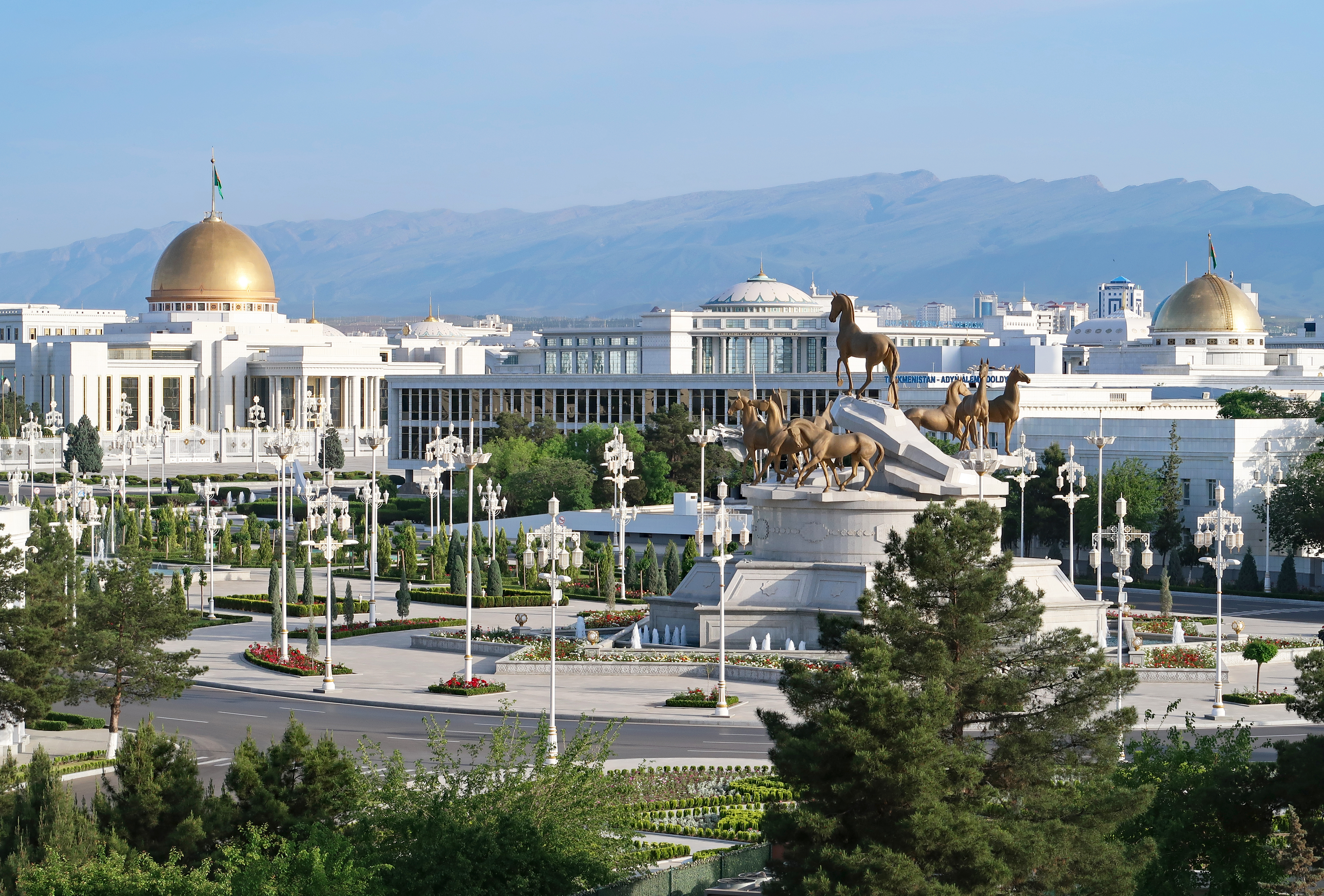
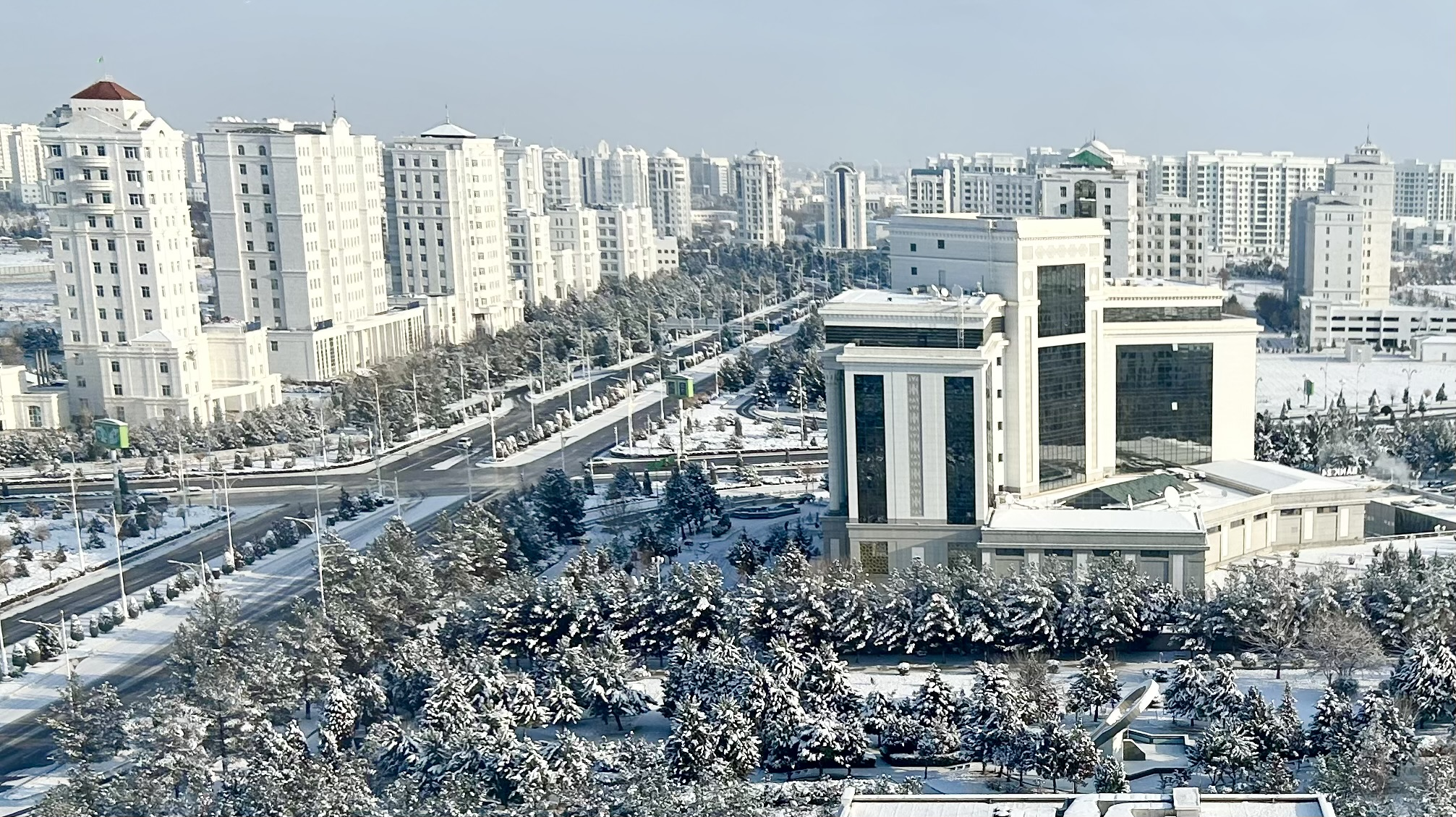
- The Presidential Palace (left) and Akhal-Teke Monument (right) Independence Monument Wedding Palace Türkmenbaşy Ruhy Mosque Residential buildings

- Seal Logo
- Nickname: White Marble City
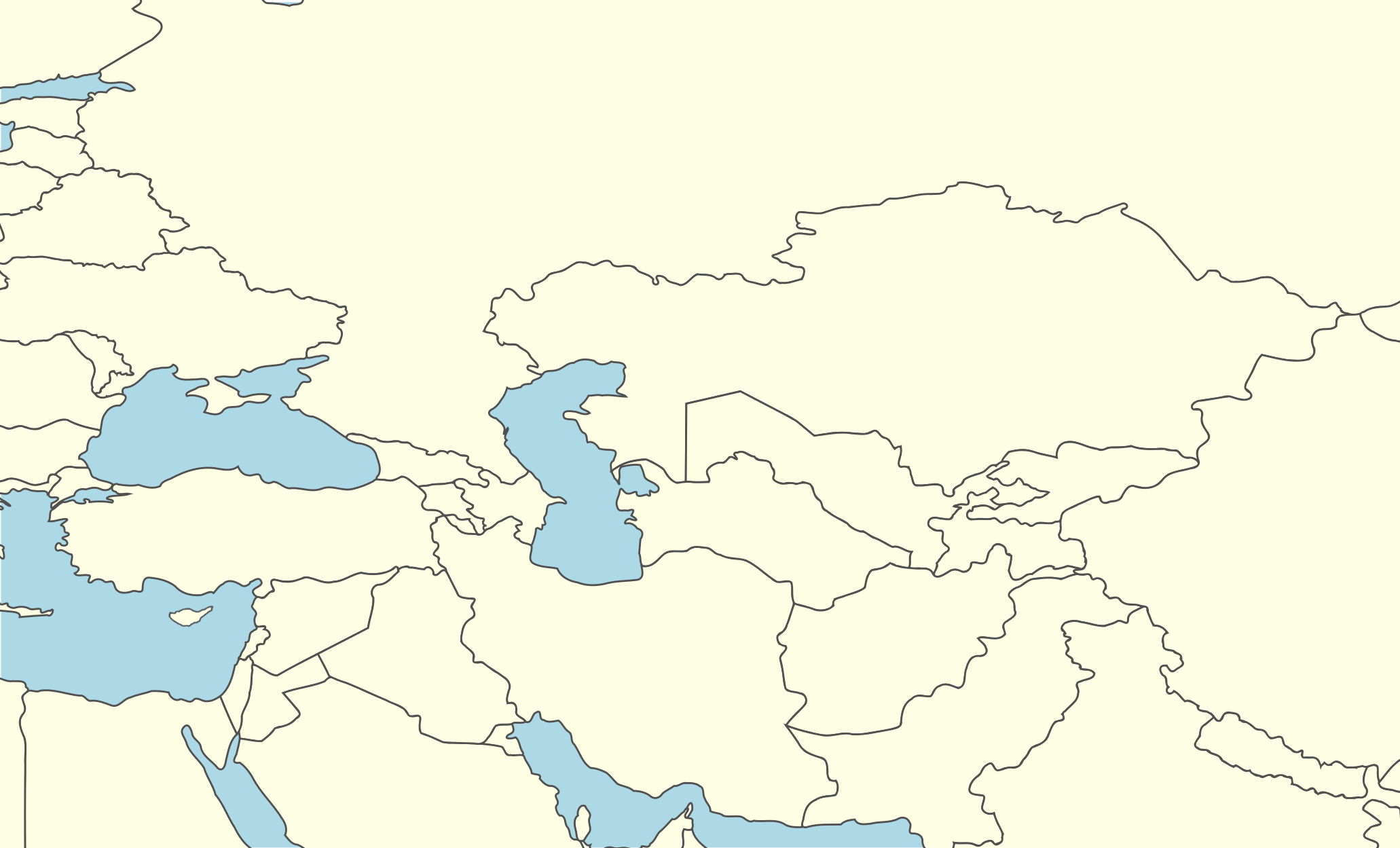
- Location within Turkmenistan Location within Central Asia Location within Asia
- Coordinates: 37°56′15″N 58°22′48″E
- Country: Turkmenistan
- Founded: 1881
- Districts: 4 districts

Government
  - Type: Presidential
  - Mayor: Rahym Nurgeldiyewic Gandymow (since 9 June 2021)

Area
  - Total: 470 km^{2} (180 sq mi)
- Elevation: 273 m (896 ft)

Population (2022 census)
  - Total: 1,030,063
  - Density: 2,200/km^{2} (5,700/sq mi)
- Demonym: Aşgabatly (Turkmen)
- Time zone: UTC+05:00 (TMT)
- Postal code: 744000–744040
- Area code: (+993) 12
- Vehicle registration: AG
- International Airports: Ashgabat International Airport
- Rapid transit system: Ashgabat Monorail
- Website: ashgabat.gov.tm

Ashgabat (Note: /ˌɑːʃɡəˈbɑːt/ or /ˈɑːʃɡəbæt/) (Note: Turkmen: Aşgabat, pronounced [ˌɑʃɢɑˈbɑːt]; Persian: عشق‌آباد, romanized: Eshqâbâd, pronounced [ˌʔeʃɢ.ʔɒːˈbɒːd]) is the capital and largest city of Turkmenistan. It lies between the Karakum Desert and the Köpetdag mountain range in Central Asia, approximately 50 km (30 mi) away from the Iran-Turkmenistan border. The city has a population of 1,030,063 (2022 census).

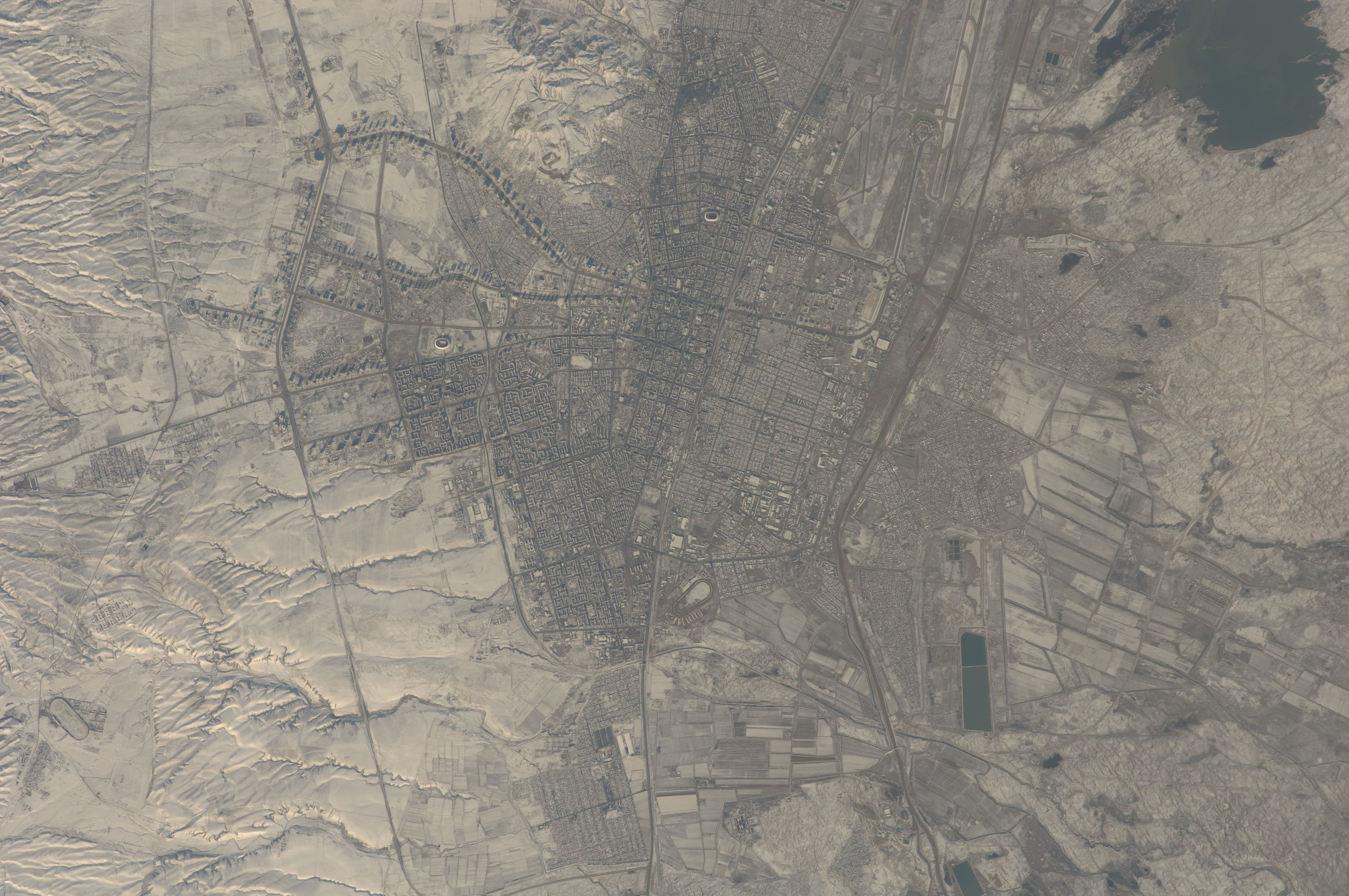
Satellite view of Ashgabat

The city was founded in 1881 on the basis of an Ahal Teke tribal village, and made the capital of the Turkmen Soviet Socialist Republic in 1924 when it was known as Poltoratsk. (Note: The name was used from 1919 to 1927. Russian: Полтора́цк, IPA: [pəltɐˈratsk]) Much of the city was destroyed by the 1948 Ashgabat earthquake, but has since been extensively rebuilt under the rule of Saparmyrat Nyýazow's "White City" urban renewal project, resulting in monumental projects sheathed in costly white marble. The Soviet-era Karakum Canal runs through the city, carrying waters from the Amu Darya from east to west.

Today, as the capital of an independent Turkmenistan, Ashgabat retains a multiethnic population, with ethnic Turkmen as the majority. In 2021, it celebrated 140 years of its written history. Ashgabat joined the UNESCO Global Network of Learning Cities in 2025.

== Etymology ==
Ashgabat is called Aşgabat (transliterated as "Ashgabat") in Turkmen, Russian: Ашхабад, romanized: Ashkhabad in Russian from 1925 to 1991, and عشق‌آباد ('Ešqābād) in Persian. Before 1991, the name was usually spelled Ashkhabad in English, a transliteration of the Russian form. It has also been variously spelled Ashkhabat and Ashgabad. From 1919 until 1927, the city was renamed Poltoratsk after a local revolutionary, Pavel Poltoratskiy.

Although the name literally means "city of love" or "city of devotion" in modern Persian, the name might have been modified through folk etymology. Turkmen historian Ovez Gundogdiyev believes that the name goes back to the Parthian era, 3rd century BC, deriving from the name of the founder of the Parthian Empire, Arsaces I of Parthia, in Persian Ashk-Abad (the city of Ashk/Arsaces).

== Geography ==
Ashgabat is in near proximity, approximately 50 km (30 mi), to the Iranian border. It occupies a highly seismically active oasis plain bounded on the south by the foothills of the Köpetdag mountains and on the north by the Karakum Desert. It is surrounded by, but not part of, Ahal Province. The highest point in the city is the 401 metres (1,316 ft) high sandhill upon which the Ýyldyz Hotel was built, but most of the city lies between 200 and 255 metres (656 and 837 ft) of elevation. The Karakum Canal runs through the city.

Like the rest of Turkmenistan, Ashgabat's soil is primarily sediment that accumulated on the bottom of the Paratethys Ocean. The Kopet Dag mountains emerged toward the end of the Cretaceous Period.

=== Urban layout ===
==== 1881 to 1929 ====
Prior to 1881 any buildings other than yurts were made solely from adobe and were limited to one story in height due to the seismic risk. As of 1900 only one building in the city was two stories tall, the municipal museum. City planning began following the Russian conquest, with "very simple planning schemes". The basic layout of downtown streets "has been preserved to this day and defined the unique character of the city structure combining linear and radial types of layout of blocks". The Russian writer Vasily Yan, who lived in Askhabad from 1901 to 1904, described the city as "a little tidy town consisting of numerous clay houses, surrounded by fruit gardens with straight streets, planted with slim cottonwood, chestnut, and white acacia planned by the hand of military engineers". Another description noted,

The fortress was the center of the bureaucratic part of the city. Here stood especially sturdy thick-walled houses, with strong window grates and corner buttresses. Earthquakes were less frightening in such houses, and behind the thick walls even in the hottest months some measure of indoor coolness was retained. Each house had a garden around it, on maintenance of which residents spared neither expenditures nor water...Nearer the rail station lived the railroad workers and craftsmen. Here the houses were shorter and more densely spaced, gardens smaller, and dust on the streets greater...
Gradually a third center of Ashkhabad started to emerge, of the merchants. Roughly equidistant from the rail station and the fortress was laid out a sad marketplace, becoming not only a center of stores and stalls, but a center of gravity for merchants' residence.

==== 1930 to 1948 ====
In 1930, asphalt was used for the first time to pave Ashgabat's streets. The water supply was increased by piping water from springs in neighboring Gämi and Bagyr.

The first master plan for Ashgabat, developed between 1935 and 1937 at the Moscow Institute of Geodesy, Aerial Imagery, and Cartography, envisioned expansion to the west, including irrigation and greening of the Bikrova canyon (today Bekrewe). The city architect's office was created in 1936 but was unable to implement the new master plan "as it implied significant demolition of the existing buildings". A description of Ashgabat published in 1948 just before the earthquake noted, "In Ashgabat there are nearly no tall buildings, thus every two-story building is visible from above...", i.e., from the foothills. The tallest structures were the clock tower of the textile mill, the "round smokestack of the glass factory", two "exceptionally thin minarets" of the "former mosque", and "two splendid towers over the long building of the main city hotel".

==== Impact of the 1948 earthquake ====
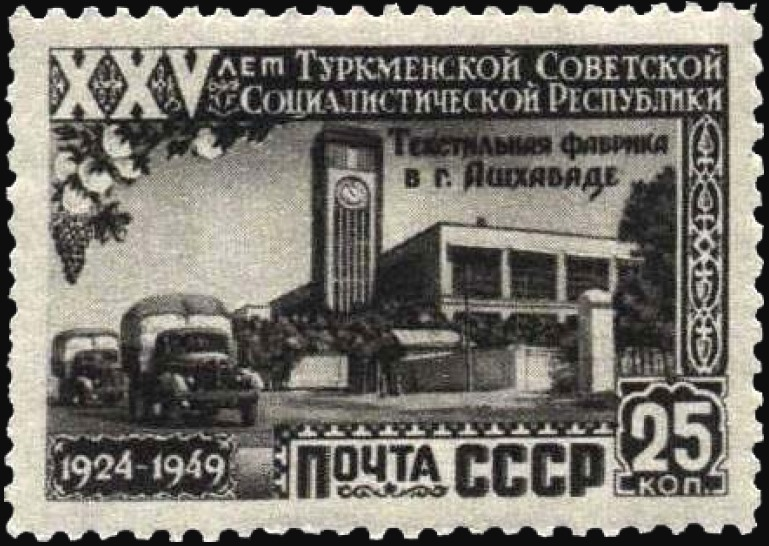
Textile factory in Ashgabat depicted on a 1950 stamp

During the 1948 earthquake, since the bulk of Ashgabat at that time was built of either adobe or fired brick, all but a very few buildings collapsed or were damaged beyond repair (the reinforced concrete grain elevator, Church of St. Alexander Nevsky, and Kärz Bank were among the structures that survived). According to Turkmenistan's official news agency,

Nearly all one-story residential buildings in the city made of mud brick were destroyed, 95 percent of all one-story buildings made of fired brick, and the remaining structures were damaged beyond repair. The number of inhabitable buildings was in single digits, and at that, only after capital renovation.

A new general plan was hastily developed by July 1949. The city was divided into four zones: central, northern, eastern, and southwestern. Reconstruction of the city began in that year. Thus from the early 1950s through 1991 Ashgabat's skyline was dominated by the Brutalist Style favored by post-Stalin Soviet architects. The city's central avenue, Magtymguly (former Kuropatkin, Freedom, and Stalin Avenue), featured "monotonous and primarily two-story construction of administrative and residential buildings". This reconstruction "preserved the existing network of city streets as it was economically unjustified to redesign them". The city was described as "...a Communist-era backwater, rebuilt into a typically drab provincial Soviet city..." The plan was updated in 1959.

Among the buildings erected in the 1950s and 1960s were the headquarters of the Central Committee of the Turkmenistan Communist Party, the Council of Ministers Building, the Mollanepes Academic Drama Theater, the former Ashkhabad Hotel (now renamed Paytagt), the Academy of Sciences complex, and the downtown library building. On then-Karl Marx Square stood a monument to the Soviet "fighters for victory of Soviet power in Turkmenistan".

==== The 1960s master plan ====
The Turkmen State Project Institute undertook a feasibility study in the mid-1960s to forecast Ashgabat's development to the year 2000, and on that basis to develop a new master plan. Up until then the city had largely expanded to the east, but now the plan called for development to the south and west. This plan was used for about 20 years, and led to construction of the city's first four-story apartment buildings in the Howdan (Russian: Гаудан) microdistricts, formerly the site of the Ashgabat-South aerodrome, as well as annexation of three collective farms in the near suburbs and their conversion into residential neighborhoods, one of which, Leningrad kolkhoz, to this day is referred to informally by its former name. The plan was reworked in 1974, and this resulted in relocation of several industrial plants away from the city center, and thus creation of the industrial zones to the northwest, south, southeast, and northeast.

Between 1961 and 1987 the city architect was Abdulla Ahmedov, who introduced Soviet modernism to Ashgabat. Ahmedov's greatest architectural accomplishment during this period is considered the Ashgabat Hotel (today renamed Paytagt Hotel), built between 1964 and 1970, "a harmonious synthesis of architecture and monumental art".

=== Growth ===
In 1948 Ashgabat was described before the earthquake as lying "on a sloping plain of the Kopet-Dag foothills, stretching seven kilometers from west to east and five kilometers from the railroad right-of-way to the south, in the direction of the mountains". Through the mid-1970s, Ashgabat was a compact city, as shown by the 1974 Soviet military's General Staff map J-40-081. The village of Köşi, collective farm "Leningrad", airport, and suburbs to the north were outside the city limits.

Beginning in the 1970s, Ashgabat's boundaries shifted outward, with the aforementioned municipalities annexed, the aerodrome at Howdan redeveloped, and creation of the Parahat (Russian: Mir) neighborhoods to the south and industrial parks to the east. In 2013, Ashgabat annexed a portion of the then-Ruhabat district of Ahal Province as well as the city of Abadan (previously named Büzmeýin, and renamed that as a neighborhood) plus all land and villages in between. The southern boundary of Ashgabat was extended southward to the foothills of the Köpetdag mountains. Overall, Ashgabat's land area rose by 37,654 hectares. The following municipalities were abolished due to their incorporation into the city of Ashgabat: city of Abadan, towns of Jülge and Ruhabat, villages of Gökje, Gypjak, Birleşik, Magaryf, Herrikgala, Ýalkym, Gurtly, Hellewler, Ylmy-Tejribe bazasy, Ýasmansalyk, Köne Gurtly, Gulantäzekli, Serdar ýoly, Gaňtar, Gyzyljagala, Inerçýage, Tarhan, Topurly, and Ussagulla. A further expansion occurred January 5, 2018, when additional land to the north was annexed, incorporating the Gurtly Reservoir and two greenfield residential construction projects, known today as Täze Zaman. This statute also established the current four boroughs of Ashgabat.

== Climate ==
Ashgabat

Climate chart (precipitation, max. and min. temperature)
| J | F | M | A | M | J | J | A | S | O | N | D |
| 21 9 0 | 32 11 1 | 39 17 6 | 28 24 12 | 21 31 18 | 8 36 22 | 3 38 25 | 2 37 22 | 3 32 17 | 12 24 11 | 22 16 5 | 17 10 1 |
- █ Average max. and min. temperatures in °C
- █ Precipitation totals in mm
- Source: pogoda.ru.net
Imperial conversion
| J | F | M | A | M | J | J | A | S | O | N | D |
| 0.8 48 32 | 1.3 52 34 | 1.5 63 43 | 1.1 75 53 | 0.8 87 64 | 0.3 97 72 | 0.1 101 76 | 0.1 99 72 | 0.1 89 63 | 0.5 76 51 | 0.9 60 41 | 0.7 50 34 |
- █ Average max. and min. temperatures in °F
- █ Precipitation totals in inches

The Köpetdag mountain range is about 25 kilometres (16 mi) to the south, and Ashgabat's northern boundary touches the Kara-Kum desert. Because of this Ashgabat has a cold arid climate (Köppen climate classification: BWk) bordering on a cold semi-arid climate (Köppen climate classification: BSk) with mediterranean influences. It features very hot, dry summers and cool, short, somewhat moist, winters. The average high temperature in July is 38.3 °C (100.9 °F). Nighttimes in the summer are warm, with an average minimum temperature in July of 23.8 °C (75 °F). The average January high temperature is 8.6 °C (47.5 °F), and the average low temperature is −0.4 °C (31.3 °F). The highest temperature ever recorded in Ashgabat is 47.2 °C (117 °F), recorded in June 2015. A low temperature of −24.1 °C (−11 °F) was recorded in January 1969. Snow is infrequent in the area. Annual precipitation is only 221 millimetres (8.70 in); March and April are the wettest months, and June to September are the driest months. In May 2022, 338 millimetres (13.31 in), 1,352% of the monthly normal, was reported.

Climate data for Ashgabat (1991–2020, extremes 1893–present)
| Month | Jan | Feb | Mar | Apr | May | Jun | Jul | Aug | Sep | Oct | Nov | Dec | Year |
|---|---|---|---|---|---|---|---|---|---|---|---|---|---|
| Record high °C (°F) | 27.8 (82.0) | 32.6 (90.7) | 38.6 (101.5) | 39.6 (103.3) | 45.6 (114.1) | 47.2 (117.0) | 46.8 (116.2) | 45.7 (114.3) | 45.4 (113.7) | 40.1 (104.2) | 35.0 (95.0) | 33.1 (91.6) | 47.2 (117.0) |
| Mean daily maximum °C (°F) | 9.0 (48.2) | 11.1 (52.0) | 17.0 (62.6) | 23.9 (75.0) | 30.5 (86.9) | 36.2 (97.2) | 38.4 (101.1) | 37.2 (99.0) | 31.8 (89.2) | 24.4 (75.9) | 15.7 (60.3) | 9.8 (49.6) | 23.8 (74.8) |
| Daily mean °C (°F) | 3.9 (39.0) | 5.7 (42.3) | 11.1 (52.0) | 17.6 (63.7) | 24.1 (75.4) | 29.6 (85.3) | 31.7 (89.1) | 30.0 (86.0) | 24.3 (75.7) | 17.1 (62.8) | 9.7 (49.5) | 5.0 (41.0) | 17.5 (63.5) |
| Mean daily minimum °C (°F) | −0.1 (31.8) | 1.3 (34.3) | 6.0 (42.8) | 11.8 (53.2) | 17.5 (63.5) | 22.3 (72.1) | 24.5 (76.1) | 22.4 (72.3) | 17.1 (62.8) | 10.8 (51.4) | 5.0 (41.0) | 1.1 (34.0) | 11.6 (52.9) |
| Record low °C (°F) | −24.1 (−11.4) | −20.8 (−5.4) | −13.3 (8.1) | −0.8 (30.6) | 1.3 (34.3) | 9.2 (48.6) | 13.8 (56.8) | 9.5 (49.1) | 2.0 (35.6) | −5.0 (23.0) | −13.1 (8.4) | −18.1 (−0.6) | −24.1 (−11.4) |
| Average precipitation mm (inches) | 21 (0.8) | 32 (1.3) | 39 (1.5) | 28 (1.1) | 21 (0.8) | 8 (0.3) | 3 (0.1) | 2 (0.1) | 3 (0.1) | 12 (0.5) | 22 (0.9) | 17 (0.7) | 221 (8.7) |
| Average rainy days | 9 | 9 | 13 | 12 | 10 | 5 | 3 | 2 | 3 | 6 | 8 | 10 | 90 |
| Average snowy days | 5 | 5 | 1 | 0.03 | 0 | 0 | 0 | 0 | 0 | 0.1 | 1 | 3 | 15 |
| Average relative humidity (%) | 78 | 72 | 66 | 58 | 47 | 35 | 34 | 34 | 40 | 54 | 68 | 77 | 55 |
| Mean monthly sunshine hours | 112.7 | 119.4 | 146.2 | 194.4 | 275.1 | 335.5 | 353.8 | 348.1 | 289.2 | 216.8 | 157.2 | 104.4 | 2,652.8 |
| Mean daily sunshine hours | 3.6 | 4.2 | 4.7 | 6.5 | 8.9 | 11.2 | 11.4 | 11.2 | 9.6 | 7.0 | 5.2 | 3.4 | 7.3 |
Source 1: Pogoda.ru.net
Source 2: NOAA (Sunshine hours 1961–1990), Deutscher Wetterdienst (daily sun 1961-1990)

== History ==
Ashgabat grew on the ruins of the Silk Road city of Konjikala, first mentioned as a wine-producing village in the 1st-2nd century BC and leveled by an earthquake in the 1st century BC. Konjikala was rebuilt because of its advantageous location on the Silk Road and it flourished until its destruction by Mongols in the 13th century. After that it survived as a small village until Russians took over in the 19th century.

The near suburb of Köşi, until 2013 a separate village but in that year annexed by Ashgabat, may have been site of a Parthian fortress constructed to protect the capital city, Nisa, based on discoveries of pottery and other artifacts in the 1970s and as recently as 2020. Other artifacts indicating settlement during the Parthian period were reportedly discovered during laying of telephone cables on the site of the Gülistan (Russian) Bazaar in downtown Ashgabat.

According to Muradov, the first mention of the settlement in modern times is found in Khiva chronicles of 1811.

British Lieutenant Colonel H.C. Stuart reported in 1881 that the Ahal branch of the Teke tribe of the Turkmen ethnic group arrived in the area around 1830 and established several semi-nomadic villages (auls) between what are now the city of Gyzylarbat and village of Gäwers, inclusive. One of these villages was named Askhabad. The first Russian reference to Ashgabat dates to 1850, in a document kept in the Russian Ministry of Foreign Affairs archives listing 43 Ahal fortresses, "Ishkhabad" among them. It was described as a "typical Turkmen aul".

It was formally part of Persia but de facto autonomous under Turkoman tribal control until Russian forces defeated the Teke army at the Battle of Geok Tepe in January 1881. Persia ceded Askhabad to the Russian Empire in September 1881 under the terms of the Akhal Treaty.

=== Russian Empire ===
The city was officially founded January 18, 1881, as a fortified garrison and was named after the Turkmen village on that site. Russian military engineers platted the garrison settlement "on the western edge of the aul (village) of Askhabad on the Gaudan (Howdan) road leading to Persia. The fortress stood on a hill 12 meters high, on which was constructed a citadel-redoubt, and below [it], the residential area, surrounded by walls and a moat." Sixty-seven Turkmen families were compensated for the land confiscated from them for this construction.

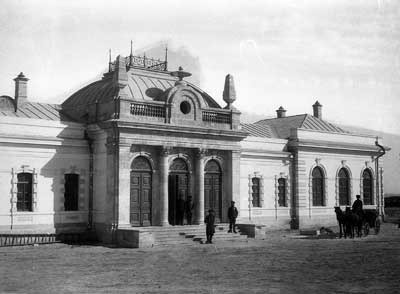
Railway station in 1901

Russia developed the area due to its proximity to the border of British-influenced Persia. In 1882 a wagon road was built through the mountains to Quchan, Iran, which led to increased trade as well as settlement of Persian and Armenian merchants in Askhabad. The Trans-Caspian railway reached Askhabad in 1885. The population grew from 2,500 in 1881 to 10,000 in 1886 and 19,428 (of whom one third were Persian) by 1897. The Transcaspian Public Library was established in 1885, boys and girls high schools were founded in 1886, and the Kuropatkin School of Horticulture and Viticulture appeared in 1890. The first telephone station was installed in 1900.

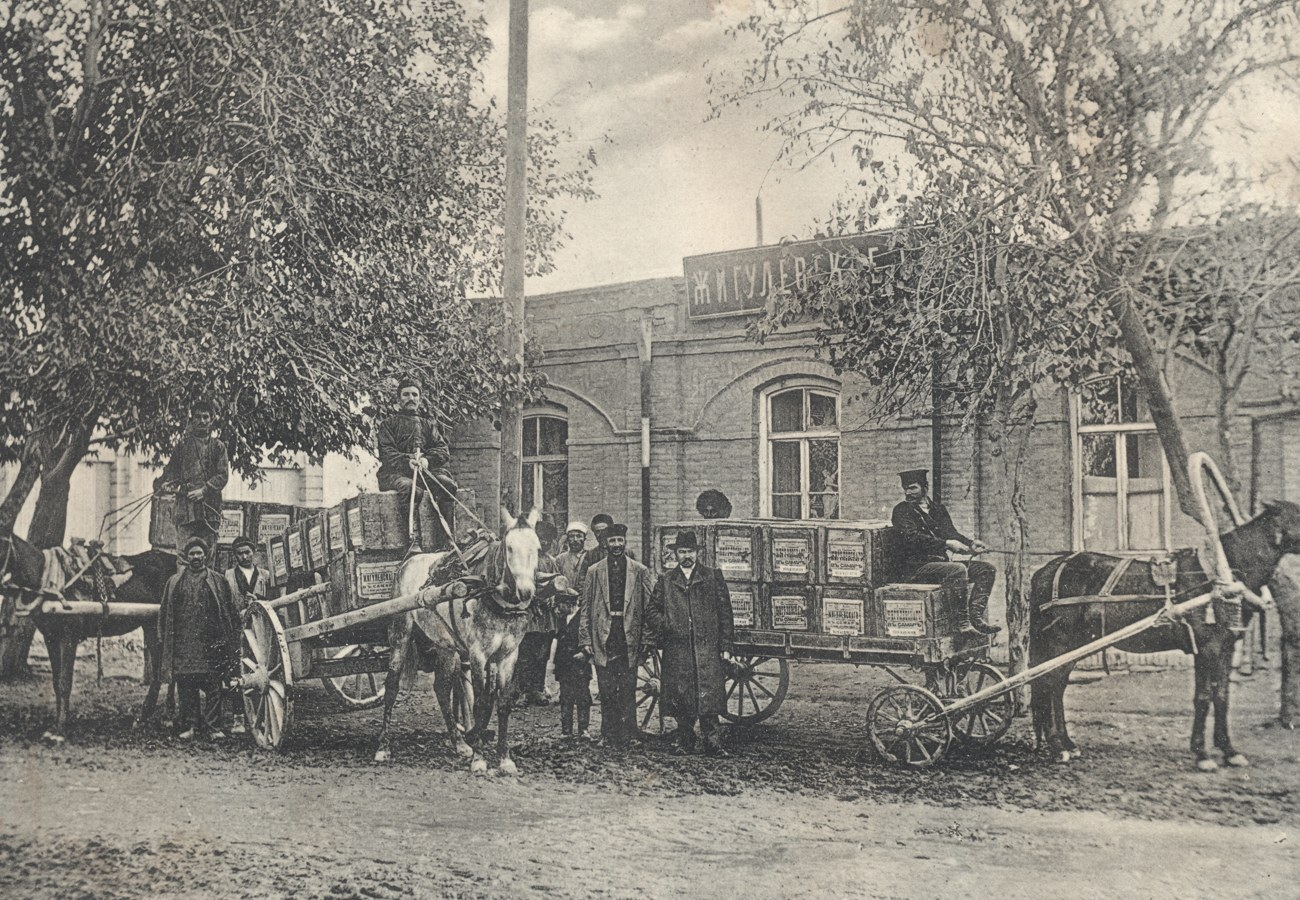
Beer warehouse before 1918

The city was regarded as a pleasant municipality with European-style buildings, shops, and hotels. Several streets were named after Russian military figures, reflecting its status as a garrison town, including the main square, named in honor of General Mikhail Skobelev, commander of Russian forces during the 1880–1881 Trans-Caspian military campaign. These included as well the western boundary avenue, named in honor of General Nikolai Grodekov, and the city's central avenue, renamed in the 1890s to honor General and Trans-Caspian Governor-General Aleksey Kuropatkin, both of whom had served in the Trans-Caspian campaign under Skobolev's command.

In 1908, the first Bahá'í House of Worship was built in Askhabad. It was badly damaged in the 1948 earthquake and finally demolished in 1963. The community of the Bahá'í Faith in Turkmenistan was largely based in Askhabad.

By 1915 Askhabad featured branches of the Russian State Bank, Persian Accounting Loan Bank, Russian-Asian Bank, Société Générale, and Askhabat Mutual Credit Union.

=== Soviet period ===
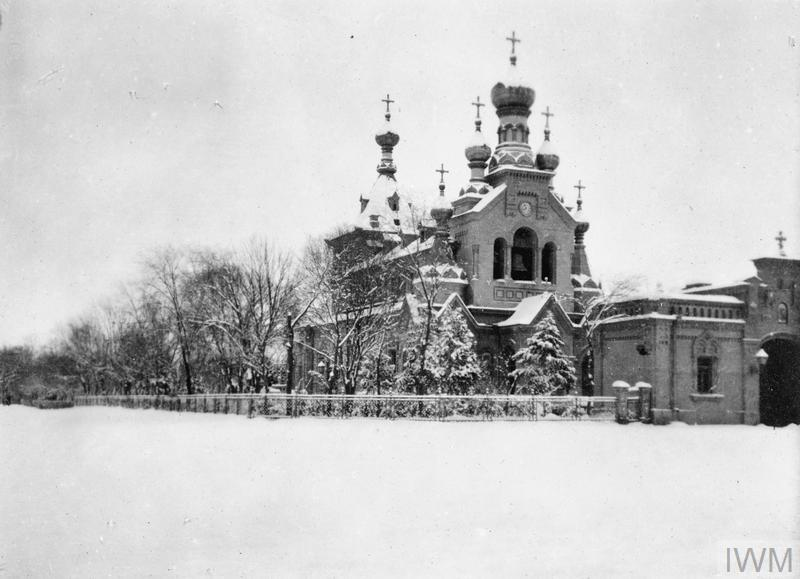
Garrison church in 1918

Soviet rule was established in Ashgabat in December 1917. However, in July 1918, a coalition of Mensheviks, Social Revolutionaries, and Tsarist former officers of the Imperial Russian Army revolted against the Bolshevik rule emanating from Tashkent and established the Ashkhabad Executive Committee. After receiving some support (but even more promises) from General Malleson, the British withdrew in April 1919 and the Tashkent Soviet resumed control of the city.

In 1919, the city was renamed Poltoratsk (Russian: Полторацк), after Pavel Poltoratskiy, the Chairman of the Soviet of National Economy of the Turkestan Autonomous Soviet Socialist Republic. When the Turkmen SSR was established in 1924, Poltoratsk became its capital. The original name but in the form of "Ashkhabad" rather than "Askhabad" was restored in 1927. In keeping with standard Soviet practice, Imperial Russian street names were changed to honor prominent Communists, Russians, or socialist ideals. For example, Skobolev Square became Karl Marx Square, Grodekov Street became Ostrovskiy Street, and Kuropatkin Avenue became Freedom Avenue (and from 1953 to 1961, following Joseph Stalin's death, Stalin Avenue). In 1927 a statue of Vladimir Lenin designed by A.A. Karelin and Ye.R. Tripolskaya was erected.

During World War II Ashgabat became a refuge for both institutions, including Moscow State University and the Kiev film studio, and individuals. Roughly 8,000 refugees were quartered in private homes during the war. Among the outsiders who escaped to Ashgabat during the war were Andrei Sakharov and author Yury Olesha. In 1944 Ukrainian motion picture director Mark Donskoy filmed Rainbow (Ukrainian: Веселка, Russian: Радуга) in Ashgabat, which was nominated for an Academy Award as best foreign film.

From this period onward, the city experienced rapid growth and industrialisation, although severely disrupted by a major earthquake on October 6, 1948. An estimated 7.3 on the Surface magnitude scale, the earthquake killed 110–176,000 (two-thirds of the population of the city), although the official number announced by Soviet news was only 40,000.

=== Independence ===
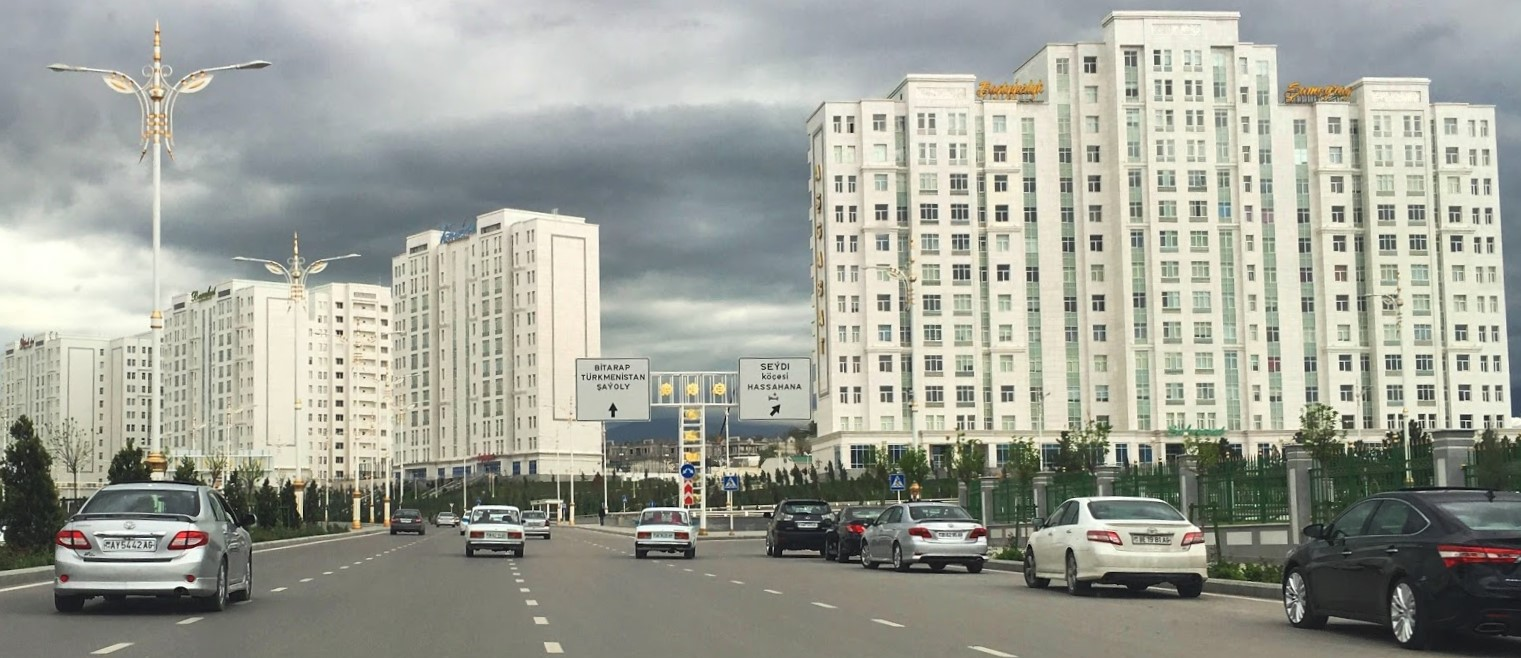
Apartment blocks

In July 2003, street names in Ashgabat were replaced by serial numbers except for nine major highways, some named after Saparmyrat Nyýazow, his father, and his mother. The Presidential Palace Square was designated 2000 to symbolize the beginning of the 21st century. The rest of the streets were assigned larger or smaller four-digit numerical names. Following Nyýazow's death in 2006, Soviet-era street names were restored, though in the years since, many of them have been replaced with names honoring Turkmen scholars, poets, military heroes, and figures from art and culture, as well as celebrating the nation's independence. For example, Karl Marx Square became Garaşsyzlyk (Independence) Square, Ostrovskiy Street became Abba Annaýew (in honor of President Gurbanguly Berdimuhamedow's great-uncle), and Freedom Avenue became Magtymguly.

In 2013, the city was included in the Guinness Book of Records as possessing the world's highest concentration of white marble buildings.

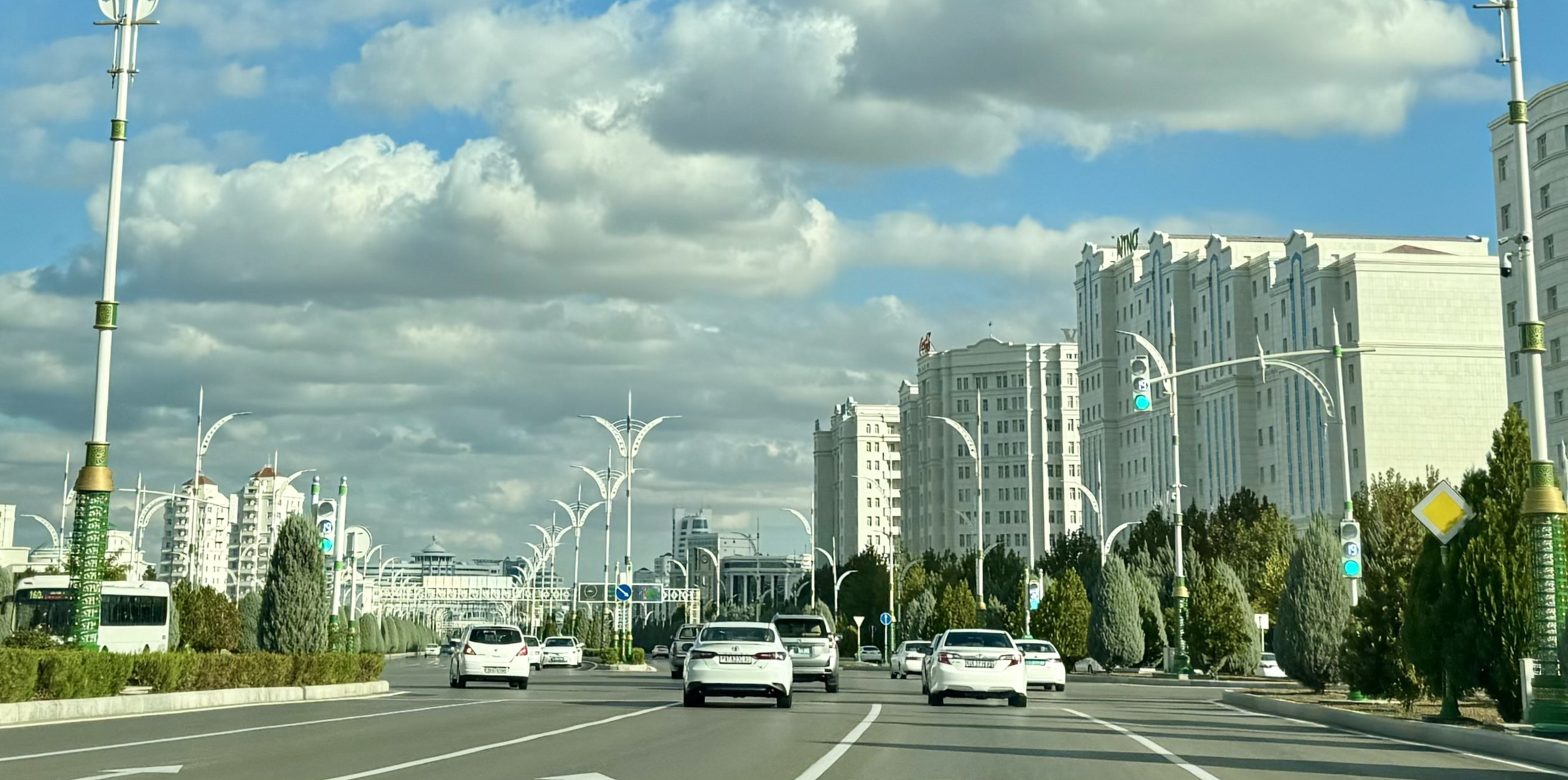
Southern part of Ashgabat

Ashgabat's "11th Line" project was dedicated on June 29, 2012, including 17 high-rise apartment buildings along 10 ýyl Abadançylyk şaýoly, two secondary schools, two kindergartens, a fire station, and a health clinic. The "12th Line" project was completed October 1, 2014, consisting of a straightening and widening of Atamyrat Nyýazow şaýoly plus construction of 13 high-rise apartment buildings, two secondary schools, two kindergartens, a new headquarters building for the Union of Industrialists and Entrepreneurs, the Telekeçi shopping center, and the Development Bank. On that same date, the new Cabinet of Ministers building was also opened.

In preparation for the 2017 Asian Indoor and Martial Arts Games, the city spent $5 billion on residential construction. December 4, 2014, the president issued a decree calling for construction of 60 9-story apartment buildings in the Parahat-7 microdistrict, a greenfield project in the southeast quadrant of the city. On November 10, 2015, the "13th Line" was dedicated, a complete reconstruction of buildings along Oguzhan street west of Garaşsyzlyk avenue. Projects included demolition and redevelopment of the Leningrad kolkhoz neighborhood as the "14th Line", and the Gazha and Vosmushka neighborhoods as the "15th Line".

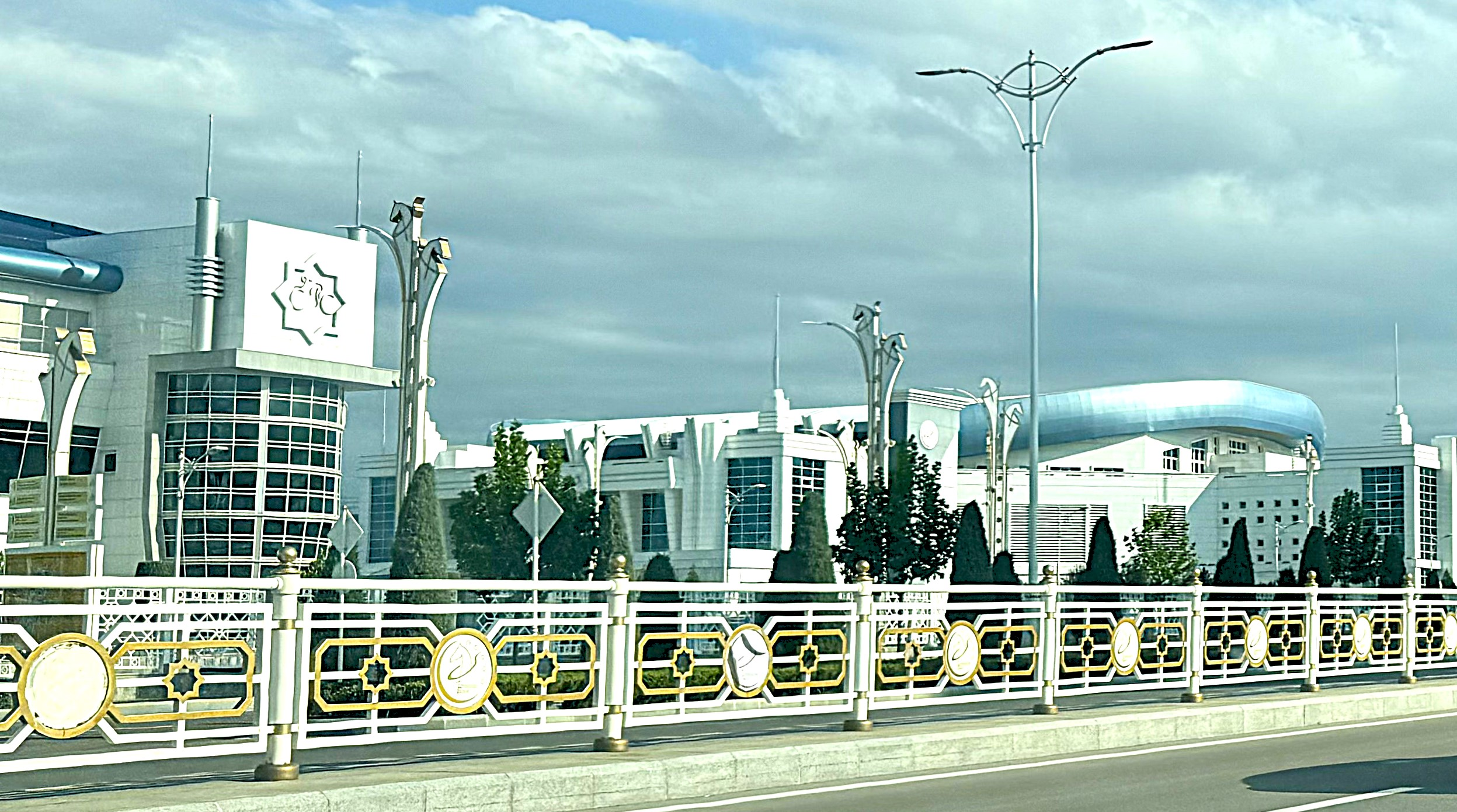
Olympic Facilities for the Asian Indoor and Martial Arts Games

Subsequent to conclusion of the Asian Indoor and Martial Arts Games, the "16th Line" project, a redevelopment of the Köşi neighborhood and extension of Magtymguly Avenue to the west, was begun in 2018. The "16th Line" was dedicated on November 10, 2020; it includes 16 high-rise apartment buildings, the Gül zemin shopping center, and a monument to the Alabay sheepdog. In addition, the Gurtly and Choganly housing complexes, both greenfield projects, were constructed. In May 2021 the government announced plans for the "17th Line", consisting of a resort complex encircling Golden Lake (Turkmen: Altyn köl), the former Gurtly Reservoir, to include 268 vacation cottages plus buildings for public services and amenities.

On 23 August 2022 the government announced plans to demolish one- and two-story houses in several microdistricts of central Ashgabat and to replace them with modern apartment buildings. A map of the areas intended for urban renewal was broadcast on national television that day, but no indication of a timeline was given.

The largest current residential project is construction of "Ashgabat-City" (Turkmen: Aşgabat-siti) north of the Çoganly residential neighborhood, which is planned to include over 200 buildings on 744 hectares, and for the first time in the city's history to feature some buildings as tall as 35 stories. These will include 180 12- to 35-story residential buildings containing 17,836 apartments intended to house over 107,000 occupants.

Ashgabat milestones:

- 1882–1918 – administrative center of Russia's Transcaspian Region
- 1918–1925 – administrative center of the Turkmen Oblast in the Turkestan Autonomous Soviet Socialist Republic
- since February 1925 – capital of the Turkmen Soviet Socialist Republic
- since October 1991 – capital of independent Turkmenistan

== Districts ==
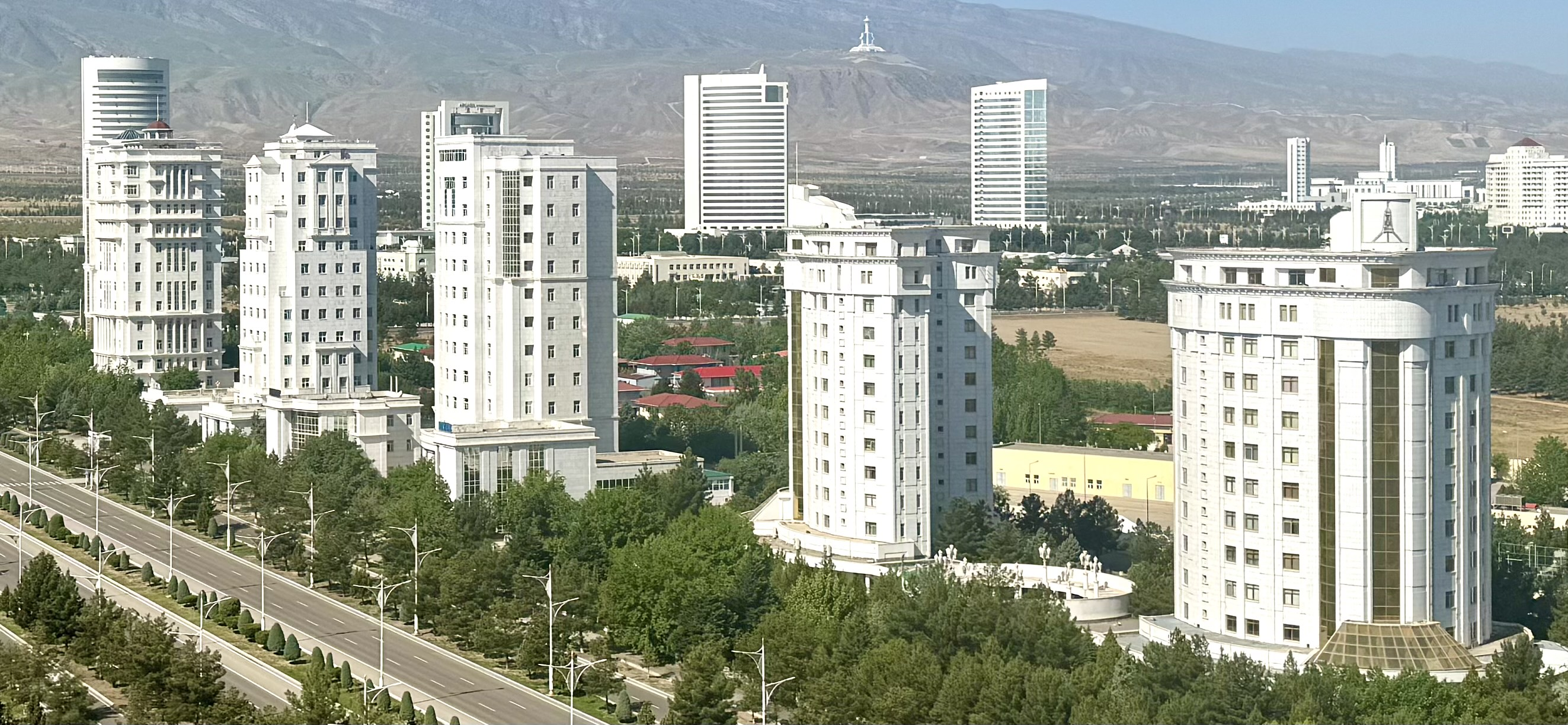
Residential buildings at Garyşsyzlyk Avenue in Ashgabat

=== Boroughs ===
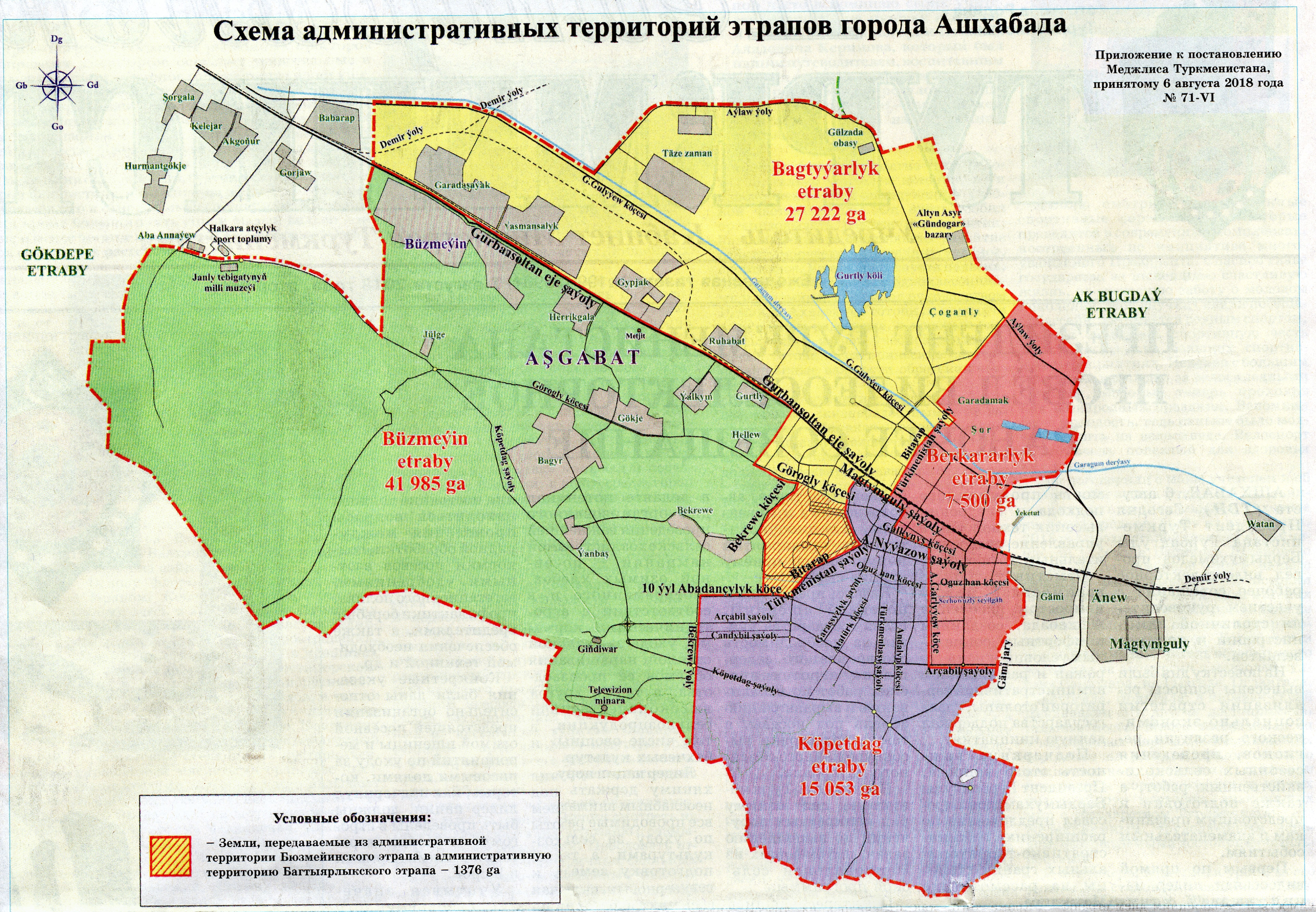
The four boroughs of the city

As of January 5, 2018, Ashgabat includes four boroughs (uly etraplar), each with a presidentially appointed mayor (Turkmen: häkim):

1. Bagtyýarlyk etraby (formerly President Nyýazow, Lenin District, expanded to include former Ruhabat District plus new territory)
2. Berkararlyk etraby (formerly Azatlyk, Sovetskiy District)
3. Büzmeýin etraby (formerly Abadan District, expanded to include former Arçabil and Çandybil Districts)
4. Köpetdag etraby (formerly Proletarskiy District)

This is a reduction from the previous number of boroughs. Arçabil and Çandybil boroughs were merged on February 4, 2015, and the new etrap, named Arçabil, was in turn renamed Büzmeýin in January 2018. At that time the Abadan borough of Ashgabat, created in 2013 by annexing the town of Abadan and surrounding villages to Abadan's south, was abolished and its territory was merged into the newly renamed Büzmeýin borough. The former Ruhabat borough was abolished at the same time and its territory absorbed by Bagtyýarlyk borough.

On 15 June 2020, Turkmen President Gurbanguly Berdimuhamedow announced intention to create a fifth borough of Ashgabat, to be called Altyn etraby, centered on the new resort zone created on the shores of the former Gurtly Water Reservoir, recently renamed "Golden Lake" (Altyn köl).

=== Microdistricts ===
Ashgabat's boroughs are subdivided into microdistricts (Russian: микрорайоны, singular микрорайон, Turkmen: etrapçalar, singular etrapça). These are administrative units that possess no independent governance structures. They are used for management of utilities and publicly owned housing. Ashgabat includes the following microdistricts:

- 1 through 11 Etrapça
- 30 Etrapça
- Howdan A
- Howdan B
- Howdan W
- Parahat 1 through 8

== Demographics ==
In 1871, a Russian visitor named Strebnitskiy counted over four thousand "nomad tents" (yurts), implying a population of 16 to 20 thousand Ahal Teke Turkmen, many of whom were killed or dispersed in the 1881 Battle of Geok Tepe. The population was 2,500 in 1881, virtually all Russian. By 1886, Askhabad's population was about 10,000, mainly ethnic Russians. Construction of the Trans-Caspian Railway stimulated an influx of migrants seeking employment, particularly from the Caucasus, Volga Valley, and Iran, and Askhabad's subsequent population growth was as follows:

- 1897: 19,426
- 1908: 39,867
- 1911: 45,384

Ethnic Russians dominated the population after 1881, with about 20 percent admixture of Caucasus-origin migrants (mainly Armenian). One source indicates that pre-revolutionary Askhabad had no Turkmen residents at all, and that they lived in nearby auls. This began to change in the 1920s, following imposition of Soviet power, which brought with it forced collectivization. In 1926 Ashkhabad's population of 51,593 included 52.4% Russians, 13.53% Armenian, 4.3% Persians, and 29.8% "other". By 1939, Ashkhabad counted 126,500 residents, including 11.7% Armenian. The 1959 census recorded a population of 169,900, which grew to 338,000 by 1983, including 105 nationalities, of which ethnic Armenians constituted 40 percent.

According to estimates of the 2012 Turkmen census, the Turkmens form 78.5% of the city's population. Russians form 10% of the population, followed by Turks (1.1%), Uzbeks (1.1%), and Azeris (1%).

=== 2022 census ===
Ethnicity
| Ethnicity | 2022 census | |
| Ethnicity | Population | % |
|---|---|---|
| Turkmens | 925,656 | 89.86 |
| Russians | 68,188 | 6.62 |
| Azerbaijanis | 10,376 | 1.0 |
| Armenians | 9,761 | 0.95 |
| Uzbeks | 5,179 | 0.5 |
| Tatars | 2,585 | 0.25 |
| Kurds | 2,159 | 0.21 |
| Ukrainians | 1,460 | 0.14 |
| Kazakhs | 703 | 0.07 |
| Persians | 584 | 0.06 |
| Lezgins | 510 | 0.05 |
| Koreans | 164 | 0.02 |
| Balochi | 184 | 0.02 |
| Afghans | 101 | 0.01 |
| Karakalpaks | 31 | 0.0 |
| Other groups | 2,422 | 0.24 |
| Total | 1,030,063 | 100% |

== Architecture ==
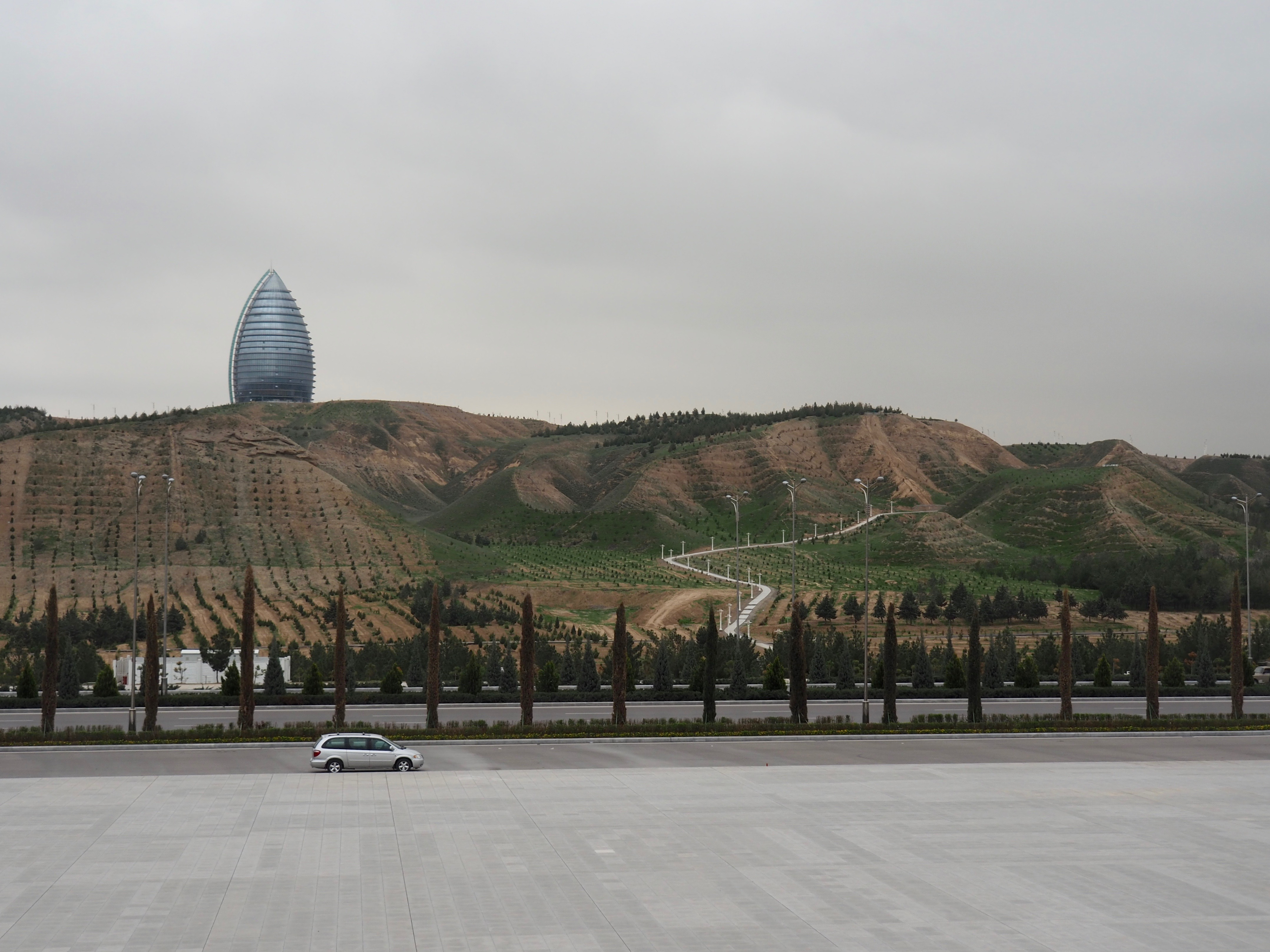
Yyldyz Hotel in Ashgabat

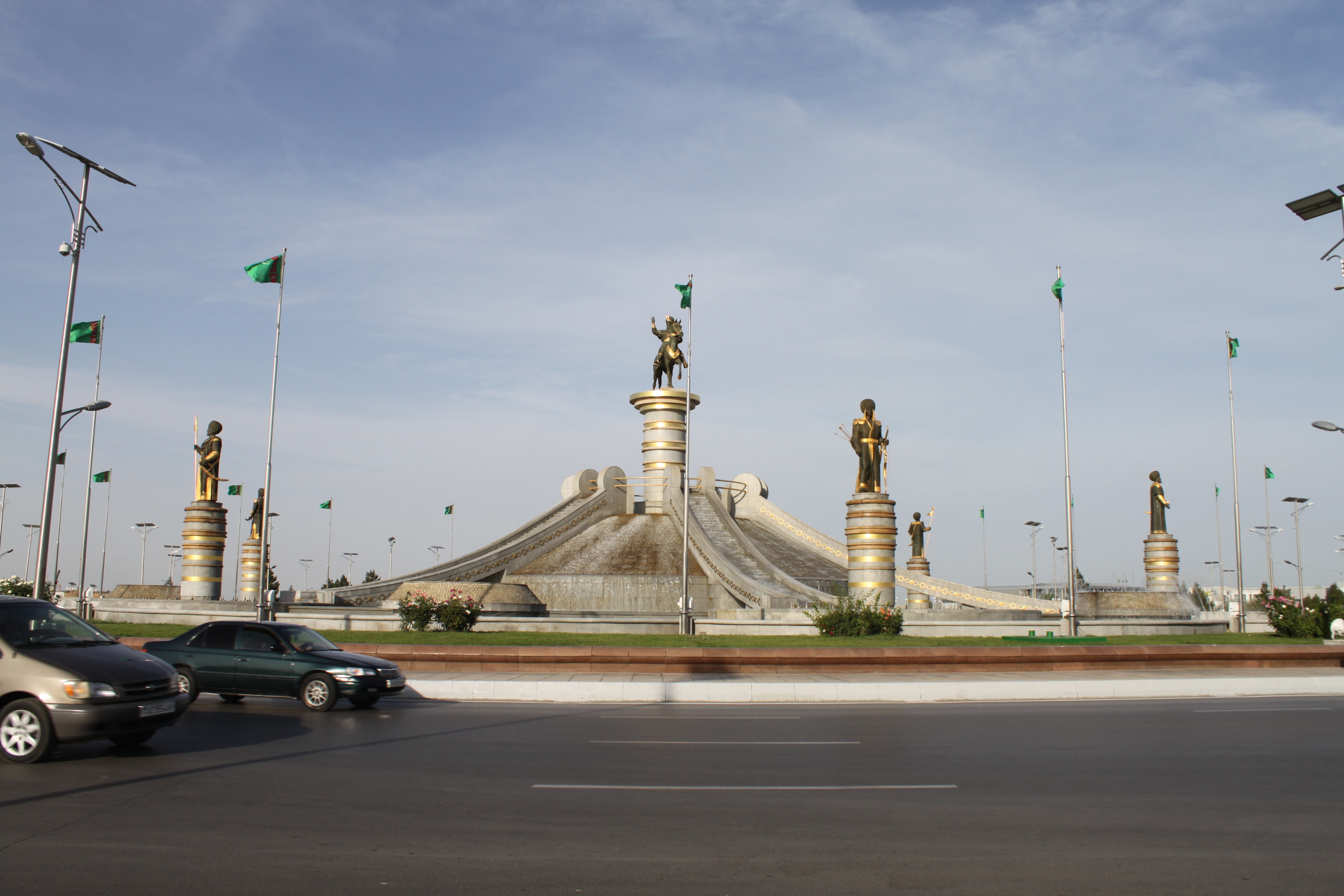
Ashgabat Oguzkhan Fountain

=== Post-1991 ===
Following independence in 1991, President Saparmyrat Nyýazow began hiring foreign architectural and construction firms, most prominently Bouygues of France and the Turkish firms Polimeks and Gap Inşaat, the latter a subsidiary of Çalık Holding. These firms blended Persian-style domes, which Nyýazow favored, with Greco-Roman architectural elements such as pillars.

Following Nyýazow's death, domes began to go out of fashion for buildings other than mosques, and public buildings began to take on more modernist characteristics, often with a motif reflecting the structure's intended occupant. For example, the Ministry of Foreign Affairs building is topped by a globe of the Earth, inside which is a conference center; the Development Bank building is topped by a giant coin; the Ministry of Health and Medical Industry building is shaped like a stylized caduceus, the dental hospital is shaped like a molar and the international terminal of Ashgabat International Airport is shaped like a falcon. The dominant characteristic of new construction since 1991 has been nearly universal facing with white marble. Another recurring motif is the eight-pointed star of Oguz han, the largest of which is on the television tower and has entered the Guinness Book of World Records. The official Turkmen government guide book to Ashgabat refers to the star of Oguz Khan as "...the basic dominant of the whole architectural-art decor..."

After independence, the city architect's office ordered construction of many high-rise (generally 12-story) residential buildings. Modern construction techniques allow high-rise development with good seismic safety. Primarily consisting of residential towers, the first floor is typically used as retail space and for building maintenance.

=== Monuments and statues ===
Ashgabat features many sculptures honoring Turkmen, Turkic, and other Islamic poets and heroes. Four statues, of Lenin, Alexander Pushkin, Taras Shevchenko, and Magtymguly, date to the Soviet period, as do a statue and a bust of Turkmen composer Nury Halmammedov. Since then, however, many new sculptures have appeared. In Ylham (Inspiration) Park are found numerous busts and statues. Additional statues can be seen in the VDNH Park. A monumental statue of the current president was dedicated in May 2015 near Ashgabat Stadium. One also finds statues of Mustafa Kemal Atatürk and Alp Arslan. In addition to the statue of former President Nyýazow atop the Neutrality Monument, a gilded statue of him stands before the Ministry of Internal Affairs, and a gilded seated statue of him graces the entry to the Turkmen Agricultural University.

Since independence in 1991, several monuments to features of Turkmenistan's governance have been erected: to neutrality, to the constitution, to the renaissance of Turkmenistan, to independence, as well as a special monument to former President Saparmyrat Nyýazow's magnum opus, Ruhnama.

The memorial complex in Bekrewe includes a statue of a bull with the Earth balanced on its horns, symbolizing the 1948 earthquake, and a statue of two traditionally dressed Turkmen warriors guarding a widow grieving the death of her husband in World War II. The exterior wall of the museum features bas reliefs depicting events in Turkmenistan's history.

In advance of the V Asian Indoor and Martial Arts Games held in September 2017, roughly one billion dollars was spent on widening and upgrading Ashgabat's major thoroughfares. Several traffic circles were created, in which were placed mainly abstract monuments. As of 2020 the most recent addition to these are the Bicycle Monument (Turkmen: Welosiped binasy), which President Berdimuhamedow dedicated on June 3, 2020, and the Turkmen Alabay monument, dedicated on November 10, 2020.

In May 2024, a monument dedicated to the 300th anniversary of the birth of Turkmen poet and philosopher Magtymguly Pyragy was unveiled in Ashgabat, near Walk of Health at the foot of the Köpetdag mountain range. The 60-meter sculpture of the poet stands on a 20-meter pedestal, to which a majestic staircase with massive granite bowls leads.

In October 2024, a statue of Kazakh poet Abai Qunanbaiuly was unveiled in Laçyn Park in Ashgabat.

=== Controversies ===
Much of the urban renewal since 1991 has involved demolition of traditional single-family residential housing, commonly with allegedly forced eviction of residents, and often without compensation to the homeowners. In particular, private homes rebuilt in neighborhoods flattened by the 1948 earthquake, many of which were never formally registered with the government, were subject to confiscation and demolition without compensation, as were former dacha communities like Ruhabat, Berzeňňi, and Çoganly, which in nearly all cases lacked formal ownership documents.

=== First Baha'i Temple in the world ===
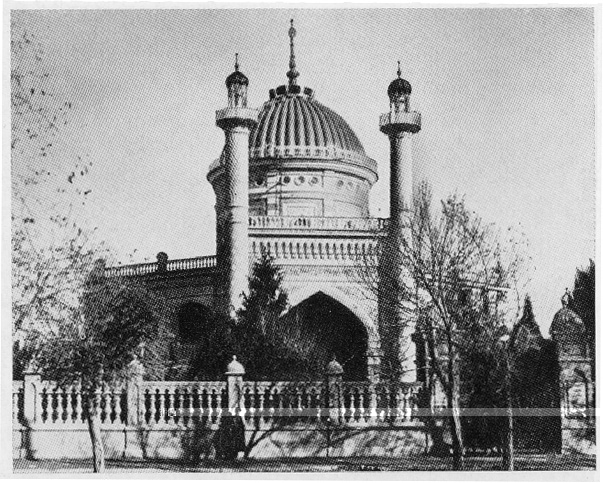
First Bahá'í House of Worship 1908

When Ashgabat was under Russian rule, the number of Bahá'ís in the city rose to over 1,000, and a Bahá'í community was established, with its own schools, medical facilities and cemetery. The community elected one of the first Bahá'í local administrative institutions. In 1908 the Bahá'í community completed the construction of the first Bahá'í House of Worship, sometimes referred to by its Arabic name of mašriqu-l-'aḏkār (Arabic: مشرق اﻻذكار), where people of all religions may worship God without denominational restrictions. The building was designed under the guidance of `Abdu'l-Bahá by Ustad' Ali-Akbar Banna Yazdi who also wrote a history of the Baha'is in Ashgabat.

The House of Worship itself was surrounded by gardens, with four buildings at the four corners of the gardens: a school, a hostel where travelling Bahá'ís were entertained, a small hospital, and a building for groundskeepers.

Under the Soviet policy towards religion, the Bahá'ís, strictly adhering to their principle of obedience to legal government, abandoned these properties in 1928. For the decade from 1938 to 1948, when it was seriously damaged by the earthquake, it was an art gallery. It was demolished in 1963.

=== Other notable structures ===
The Arch of Neutrality was dismantled and re-erected in its original form in the south of the capital.

Turkmenistan Tower, the television and radio broadcasting tower, at a height of 211 meters is the tallest structure in the country. It was built on October 17, 2011.

The administrative center of Ashgabat as the national capital is on the Arçabil highway, where several ministries and agencies, as well as educational, research, and cultural centers, are found. The former Novofiryuzenskoye shosse (New Firyuza Highway) was rebuilt by Gap Inşaat in 2004.

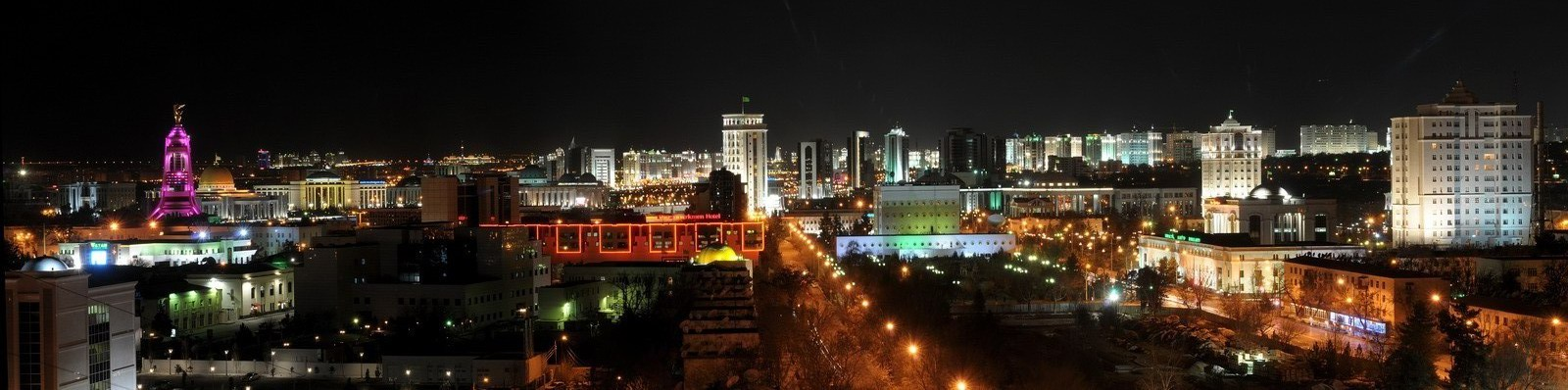
Panorama of Ashgabat at night

== Economy ==
The principal industries are cotton textiles and metal working. It is a major stop on the Trans-Caspian railway. A large percentage of the employment in Ashgabat is provided by the state institutions; such as the ministries, undersecretariats, and other administrative bodies of the Turkmenistan government. There are also many foreign citizens working as diplomats or clerks in the embassies of their respective countries. Ashgabat lends its name to the Ashgabat Agreement, signed by India, Oman, Iran, Turkmenistan, Uzbekistan and Kazakhstan, for creating an international transport and transit corridor facilitating transportation of goods between Central Asia and the Persian Gulf.

In 2019 and 2020, Ashgabat was the most expensive city in the world for foreign expatriates in ECA International's Cost of Living Survey. It was also listed as the second most expensive city in the world overall by the 2020 Mercer Cost of Living Survey. Its high cost of living for foreigners has been attributed to severe inflation and rising import costs.

=== Industry ===
Between 1881 and 1921, little industry existed in Ashgabat. Muradov relates that in 1915 the city featured "68 enterprises, mainly semi-handicrafts, with a total of 200-300 workers". Another source relates that as of 1911 roughly half the workforce of somewhat more than 400 "workers" was employed at the railroad depot, engaged in locomotive and railcar maintenance and repair, with the rest occupied in cotton ginning, cottonseed oil extraction, flour milling, and leather-, brick-, glass-, and iron production. By 1915 the city boasted as well three printing houses, an electrical power station, three cotton gins, a creamery, a tannery, and 35 brickyards.

In 1921 Soviet authorities built a new glass plant plus a wine and spirits factory. In the years following several more factories were added, including the "Red Metalworker" iron-working plant (1925), the silk spinning plant (1928), a cotton spinning plant and textile plant (1929), candy factory (1930), garment factory (1933), shoe factory (1934), and a meat cannery (1938). As of 1948, Ashgabat boasted "about twenty large factory-plant enterprises, which produce fabrics, glass, footwear, garments, meat products, dredges, agricultural implement parts and much else".

Annexation of the former city of Büzmeýin, which from 2002 to 2018 was known as Abadan, brought into Ashgabat's city limits its major industrial suburb. Today's Buzmeyin neighborhood features the Büzmeýin State Electrical Power Plant, and factories for production of reinforced concrete, cement, asbestos roofing, pipes, and concrete blocks, as well as a carpet-weaving factory and soft-drink bottling plant.

Today more than 43 large and 128 medium-sized industrial enterprises along with over 1,700 small industrial facilities are located in Ashgabat and its suburbs. The most important are Ashneftemash, Turkmenkabel, and Turkmenbashy Textile Complex.

==== Electrical power generation ====
The Abadan State Power Plant (now Büzmeýin State Power Plant), commissioned in 1957, was the first large power plant in Turkmenistan. Two gas turbine plants with a capacity of 123 MW each currently generate electricity in this plant. The Ashgabat State Power Plant, located in the southern part of city, began operating in 2006. It is equipped with gas turbine generators with a total capacity of 254.2 megawatts.

Ashgabat also draws power from the Ahal State Power Plant, located outside the city in Ahal Province. It began operating in 2010 with two gas turbines producing 254.2 MW. Three small gas turbines were added in 2013 and two more gas turbines in 2014, bringing capacity to 648.1 MW.

=== Shopping ===
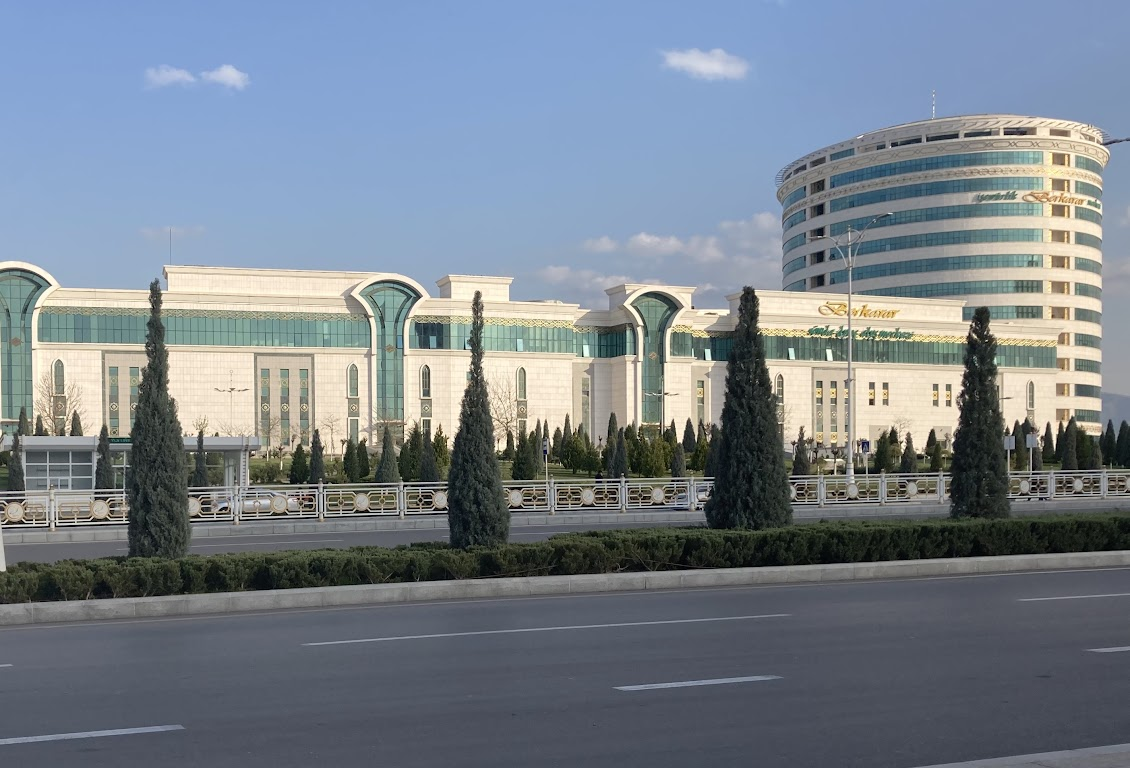
Berkarar Shopping and Entertainment Centre

Ashgabat Mall inside

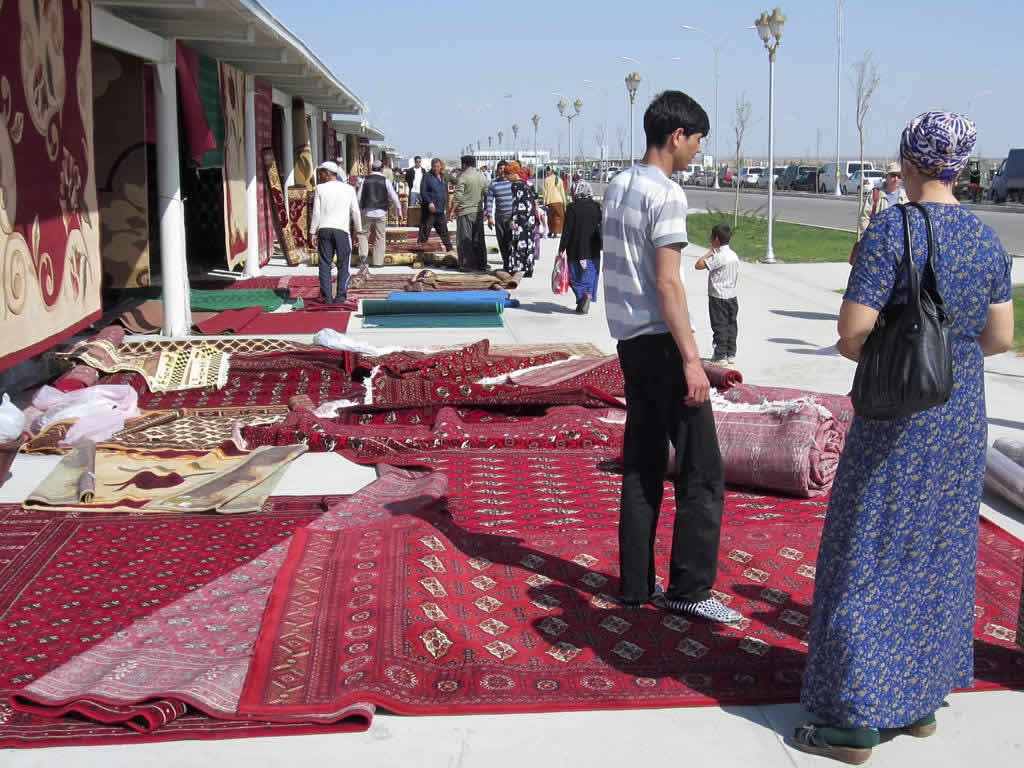
Turkmen carpets in Altyn Asyr Bazaar

Altyn Asyr Bazaar in Choganly, also known as "Tolkuchka", features manufactured items including traditional fabrics and hand-woven carpets, as well as livestock and used automobiles.

Modern shopping areas are found mostly in central streets, including the modern Berkarar Mall, Arkaç Mall, Ashgabat Shopping and Entertainment Center, Gül Zemin and Paýtagt, as well as the 15 Years of Independence Shopping Centre (Turkmen: 15 ýyl Garaşsyzlyk söwda merkezi), colloquially known as the "Wholesale Market" (Russian: Optovyy rynok).

Local residents tend to shop at traditional bazaars: Gülistan (Russian) Bazaar, Teke Bazaar, Daşoguz Bazaar, Paytagt (Mir) Bazaar, and Jennet Bazaar. The Turkish-owned Yimpaş department store closed as of December 2016.

== Transportation ==
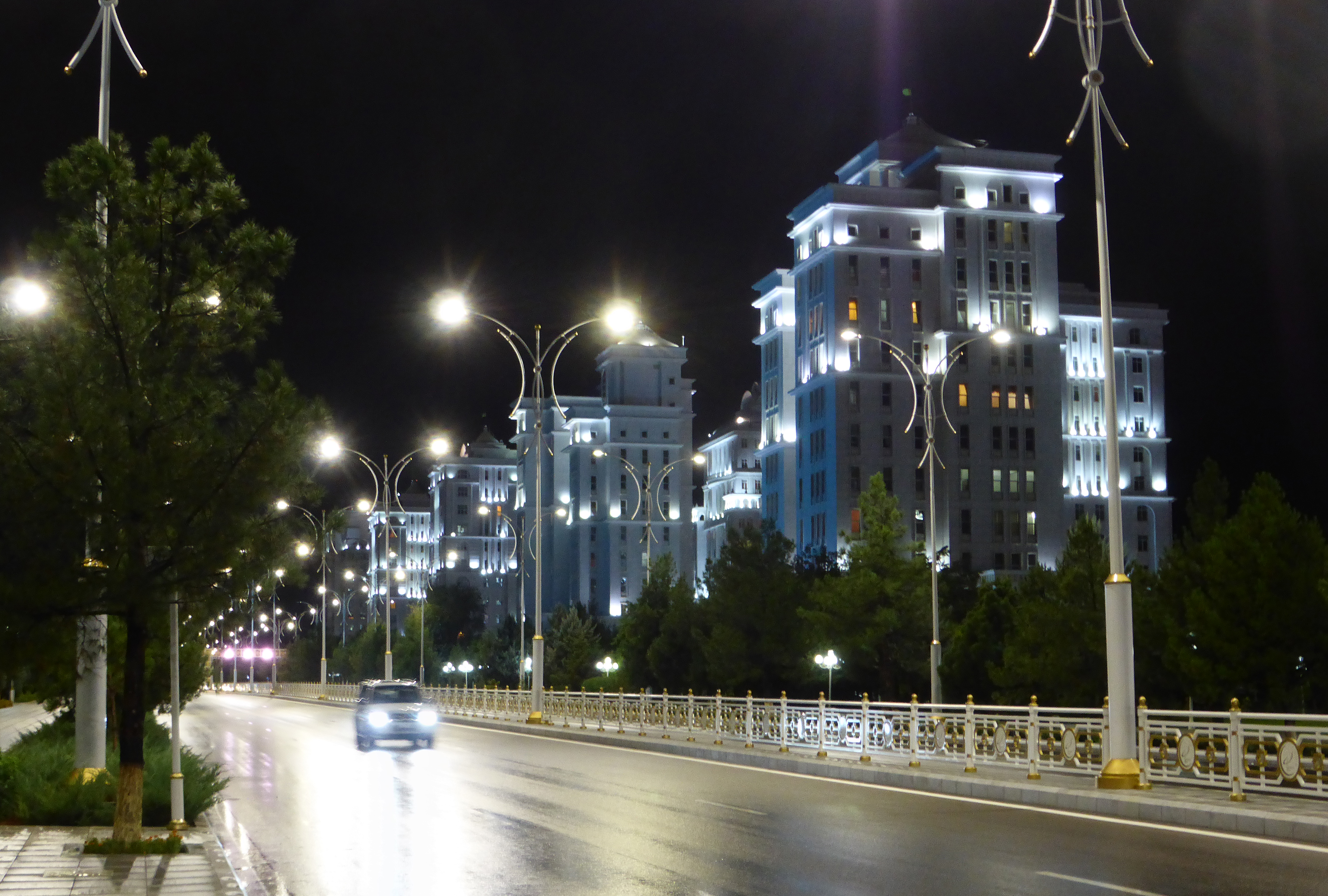
Streets of Ashgabat

On 18 October 2006, the Ashgabat Cable Car opened, connecting the city with the foothills of the Kopetdag.

Ashgabat Monorail commenced service in 2016, becoming the first monorail in the Central Asia region. It is a loop 5.2 kilometers long and circulates exclusively on the territory of the Olympic Village (Turkmen: Olimpiýa şäherçesi).

In 2015, dark-colored cars were beginning to be disallowed in the city, and by 2018, non-white vehicles were effectively banned. In January 2018, it was reported that black cars had been impounded for weeks in Ashgabat, a result of President Gurbanguly Berdimuhamedow's conviction that black cars bring bad luck. Dirty white cars can lead to fines, leaving the city with clean white vehicles.

The Ukrainian construction firm Interbudmontazh has proposed construction of a subway (metropolitan) line, to connect the Ashgabat-Siti residential area in the northern suburbs to downtown Ashgabat.

=== Air transport ===
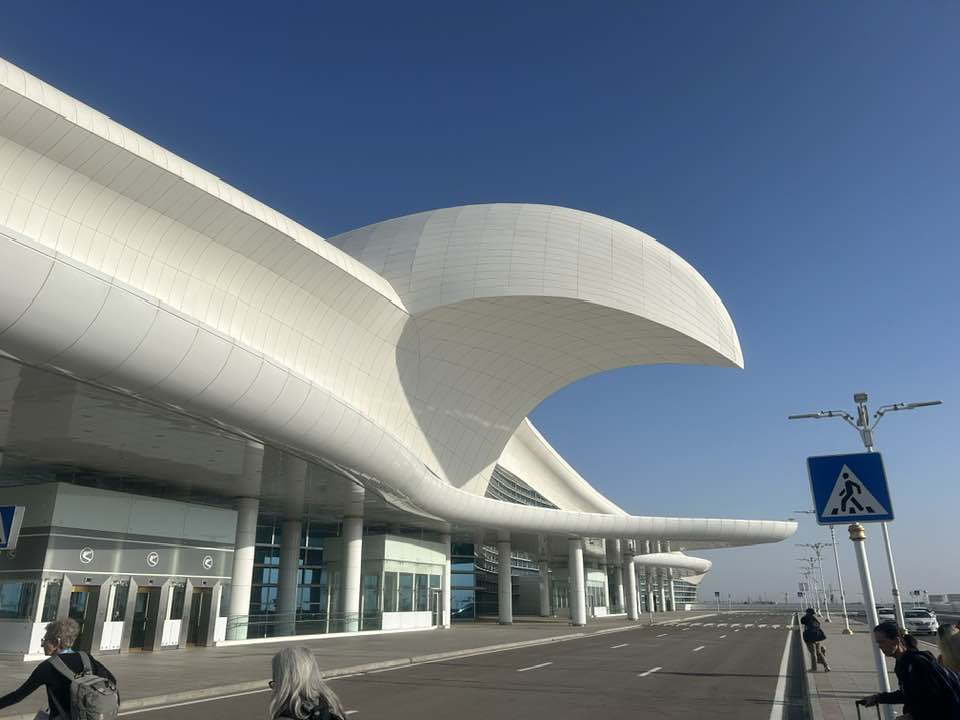
The falcon shape of the international terminal of Ashgabat International Airport

Inside the international terminal of Ashgabat International Airport

The city is served by the Ashgabat International Airport, expansion of which cost $2.3 billion and which has a design capacity of 14,000,000 passengers per year. Turkmenistan Airlines is headquartered at the airport. Among the companies that fly from there are Turkmenistan Airlines, S7 Airlines, China Southern Airlines, flyDubai and Turkish Airlines. The destinations mainly European, Southeast Asia and Middle East. Ashgabat also offers air service to and from all the major cities of the Turkmenistan.

Citizens of all countries have the right to visa-free transit through the international transit area of Ashgabat International Airport.

Ashgabat International Airport is connected to the city by a network of public buses.

=== Autobahn ===
Ashgabat is linked to Tejen, Mary, Türkmenabat and neighbouring countries by the country's 600 km autobahn network. A six-lane highway is equipped with an advanced traffic management system featuring continuous video surveillance to ensure effective road monitoring. The toll rates range from 0.35 to 0.45 Turkmen manats per kilometer, depending on the type of vehicle.

=== Railway ===
Ashgabat Railway Station

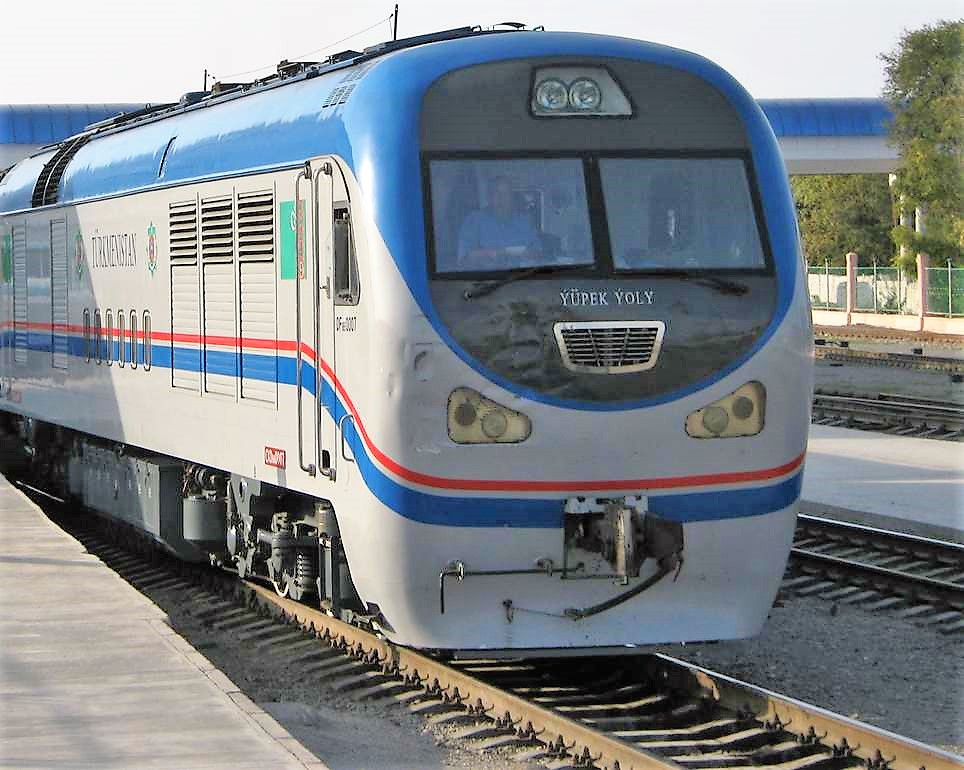
Turkmenistan Railways Diesel locomotive CKD9A in Ashgabat

Ashgabat has a single central railway station. In May 2009 the restoration of the Ashgabat railway station was completed. The railway station is made in Soviet-style architecture with its long point on the building roof.

The Trans-Caspian Railway (Türkmenbaşy–Balkanabat–Bereket–Ashgabat–Mary–Türkmenabat) runs through Ashgabat from east to west. Since 2006 there is also a train line from Ashgabat to the north, the Trans-Karakum Railway.

As of June 2025, the following railway routes are scheduled from and to Ashgabat:

- Ashgabat-Türkmenabat
- Ashgabat-Daşoguz
- Ashgabat-Serhetabat
- Ashgabat-Türkmenbaşy
- Ashgabat-Amyderýa

=== City buses and trolleybus ===
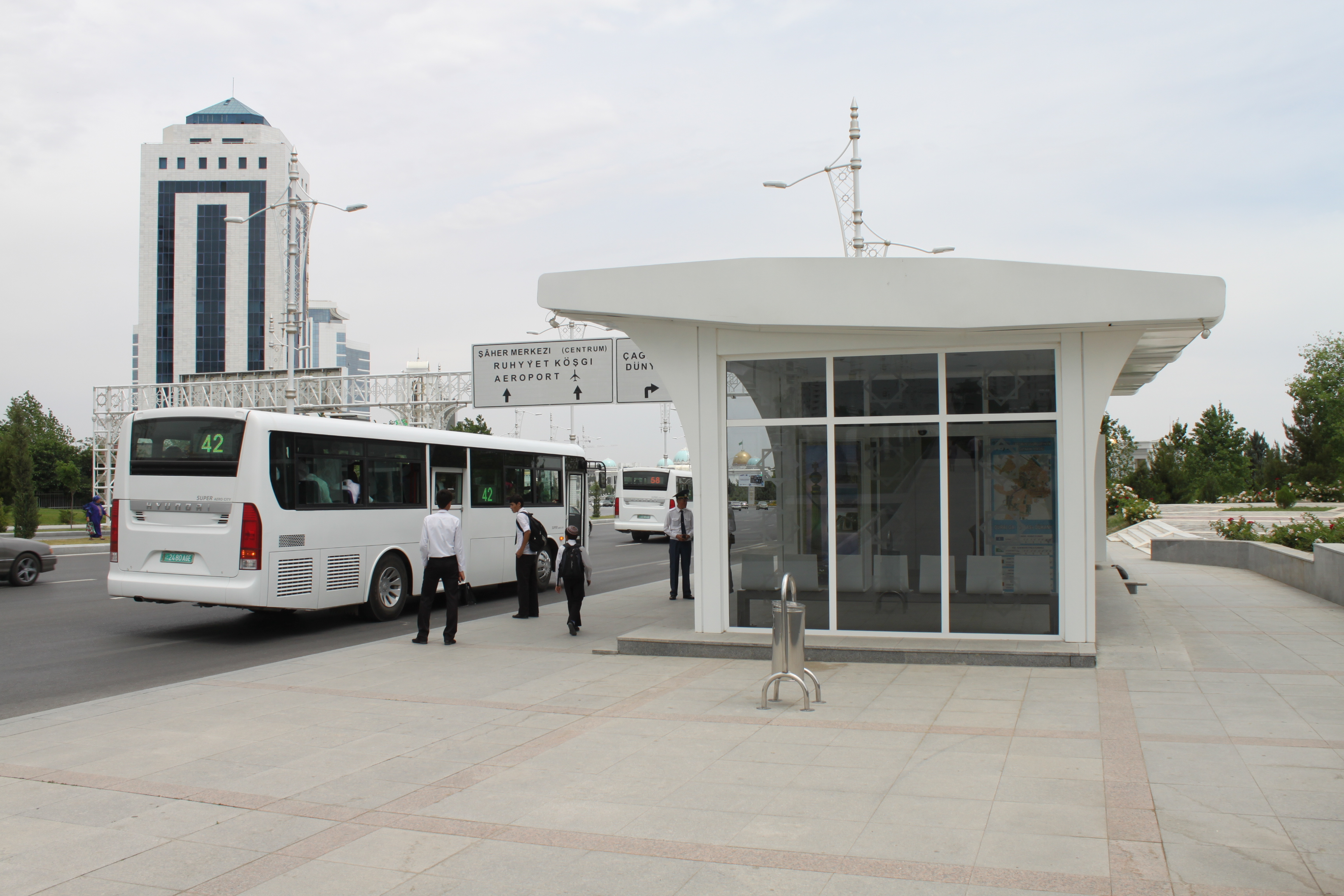
Bus stop with air conditioning in Ashgabat

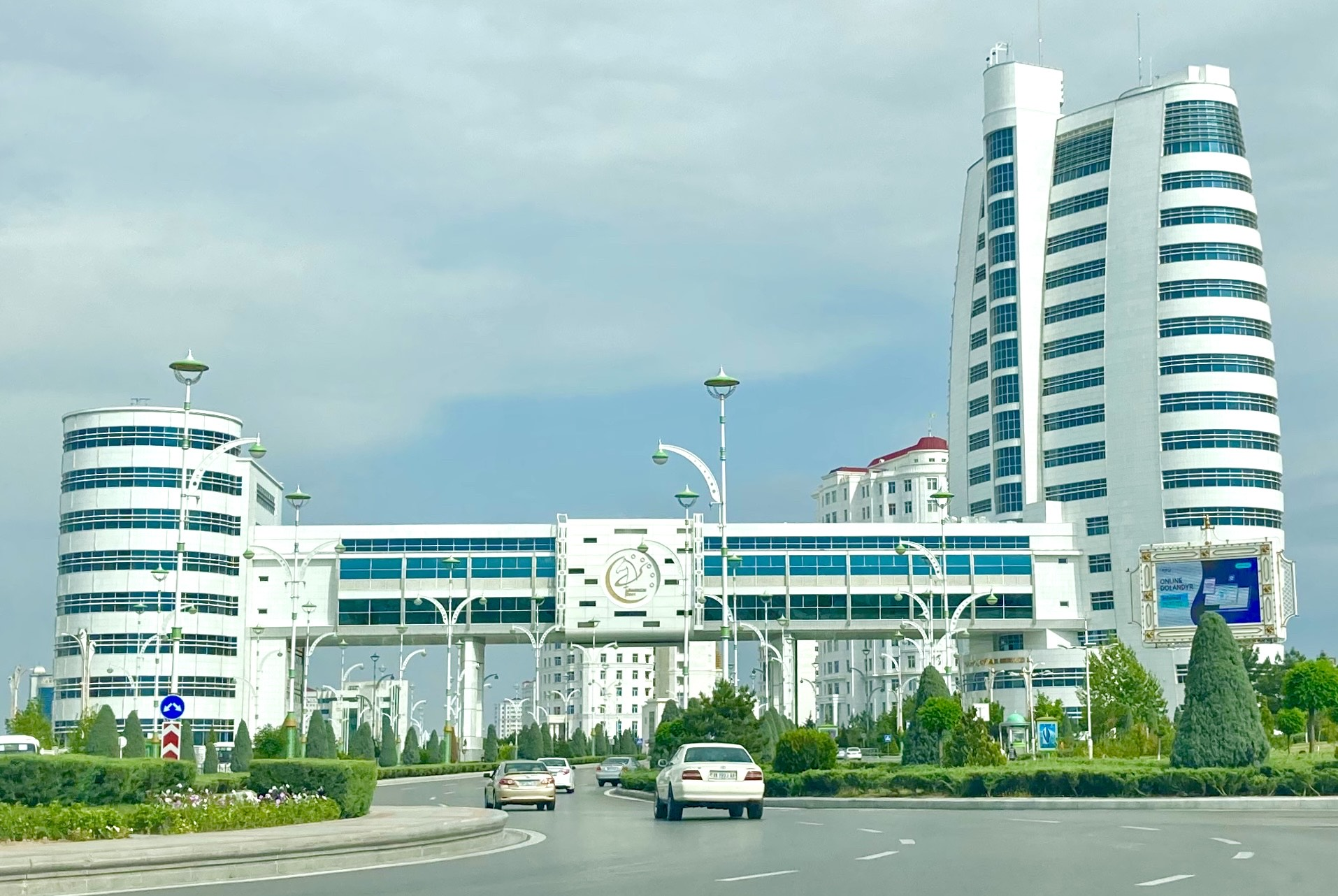
10-Ýyl Abadanchylyk Avenue

Public transport in the city consists mainly of buses. More than 100 bus lines cover a total range of more than 2,230 kilometres (1,386 miles) with 700 buses running on urban routes. In the 1990s, Iran Khodro O457 (Mercedes-Benz) buses were used in Ashgabat. In the 2000s, they were replaced by korean Hyundai New Super Aero City. buses. Since September 2025, 700 chinese Yutong ZK6128HG buses have been delivered to the city. This buses are equipped with a spacious interior, soft seats with armrests, an air conditioning system, USB charging ports, three doors, video surveillance, GPS, cameras, and a digital fare payment system.

Bus timetables and detailed schematic map of the route are at every stop. Distances between stops are about 300–500 meters.

In Ashgabat, travel on city public transport requires a fare. Passengers can either pay in cash by placing money in a box next to the driver (with change provided for large bills) or use the Ýol karty electronic payment system, which has been in full operation since September 20, 2017. The fare is 50 Turkmen tenge for city buses and 1 manat for route taxis (marshrutkas). Electronic transport cards, valid for four years, are available in three types: general, student, and pensioner. When boarding through the front door, passengers validate their cards using a special device.

Information about bus routes and stops in Ashgabat is available in the mobile application Duralga and Ýolagçy.

The new International Passenger Bus Terminal of Ashgabat was inaugurated on September 5, 2014. It offers intercity service to Bäherden, Türkmenbaşy, Daşoguz, Türkmenabat, Arçman, Köneürgenç, and Mollagara, as well as points in between. The main intracity bus terminals serving Ashgabat are near the Teke Bazaar and at the domestic airport terminal. Intercity lines are operated by Hyundai Universe Luxury, Iran Khodro SC 0457, Sahab Renault and Yutong ZK6129H.

Also, suburban communication has been established with Ýaşlyk, Gökdepe, Gorjaw, Yzgant, Babaarap, Bugdaýly, Änew, Gämi, Orazow, Watan, Hurmantgökje, Öňaldy, Gämi Dacha, Kasamly jülge, Gäwers, Ýaşyldepe, Akdaşaýak, Nyýazow, Süýtçilik, Parahat. PAZ 32054 buses and Volkswagen minibuses operate on suburban routes. Some intercity buses also stop at various other points in Ashgabat, including the airport and railway station.

From October 19, 1964, to December 31, 2011, the city also had the Ashgabat trolleybus system. At the beginning of the twentieth century a narrow-gauge steam railway connected the city with the suburb of Firýuza. As of 2011, there were 7 routes in the city. As of 2011, the Ashgabat trolleybus fleet had 47 trolleybuses (Škoda 14TrM) on its balance sheet. In 2000, the last obsolete trolleybuses of the JuMZ-T2 model were written off.

=== Taxi ===
In Ashgabat and Turkmenistan, taxicabs are mostly white or yellow coloured. Taxis have a small green illuminated cylinder-like "TAXI" sign on the roof of the car.

Typically the taxicabs are Toyota Corolla, JAC J7 and Hyundai Elantra along with other, mainly Asian, brands. Taxicabs are either sedans, station wagons, or MPVs. Most taxicabs are automatic transmission, and some have navigation systems on board.

In Ashgabat taxis are available at any time of the day or night. Passengers may also hire taxicabs via mobile apps. Other hailing methods, such as telephone based calls or raising one's hand on the street, are also common as well.

== Telecommunication ==
As of 2025, Ashgabat has two mobile phone service providers:

- Altyn Asyr is a Turkmen national state company for the provision of communication services, established in 2004. In 2010, the company launched a 3G network of UMTS standard, covering all districts of Ashgabat and the Ashgabat International Airport . On September 18, 2013, the 4G network was put into operation using LTE technology.
- Ashgabat City Telephone Network provides CDMA communication services (over 55 thousand subscribers). The network was created and put into operation by the company for the first time in 2003.

In addition to the mobile network providers, Turkmentelecom provides internet services.

As of June 2025, there are six Turkmentelecom internet cafés operating in Ashgabat. Despite the widespread availability of high-speed internet and devices in Turkmenistan, these cafés remain popular as multifunctional spaces for work, study, and cultural activities. They offer modern equipment and various digital services, such as scanning, printing, and online conferencing.

Turkmenpochta is the official national postal operator of Turkmenistan. Based in Ashgabat, it currently operates through 38 postal offices in city.

=== Media ===
Notable newspapers published in Ashgabat include the daily newspapers Türkmenistan and Neytralny Turkmenistan.

Turkmenistan Tower

==== Television ====
The main offices of 7 television channels are located in Ashgabat: Altyn Asyr, Yashlyk, Miras, Turkmenistan Sport, Turkmen Owazy, Ashgabat and Turkmenistan TV.

Ashgabat TV is main city channel. The channel tells about the events of social, cultural, economic life, the activities of scientific and educational institutions of the Ashgabat.

Almost 136 international TV channels are available in the IPTV playlist for subscribers of the Ashgabat City Telephone Network. Most of them are thematic channels: news, sports, scientific and educational, TV channels for children, channels of various genres of cinema, music.

Residents of Ashgabat also watch television via satellite dishes.

==== Radio ====
As of 2008, Ashgabat has 4 FM stations: Owaz, Char Tarapdan, Miras and Watan. These stations can additionally be streamed through Turkmentelecom's website.

== Human resources ==
=== Science and education ===
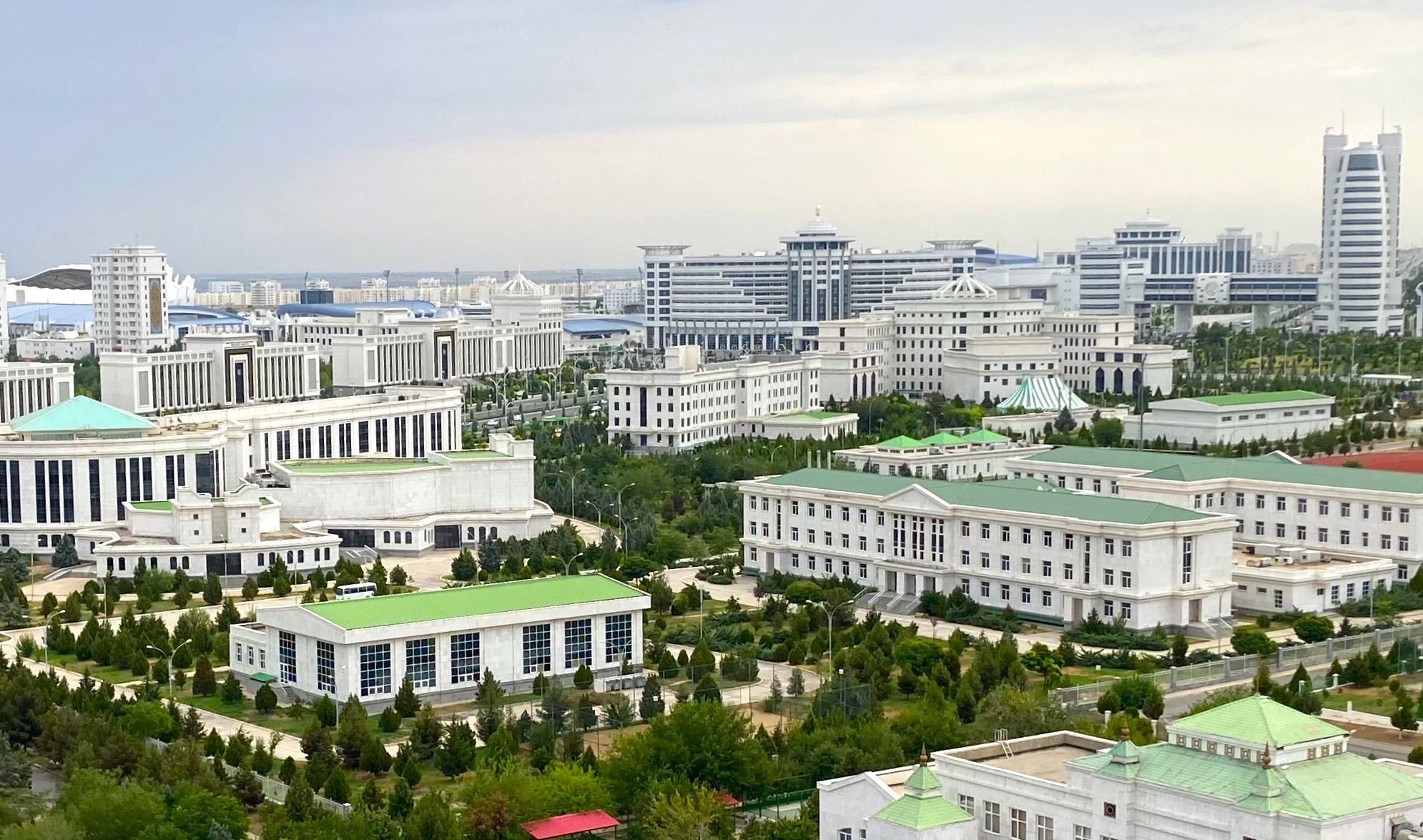
Turkmen State Institute of Culture campus

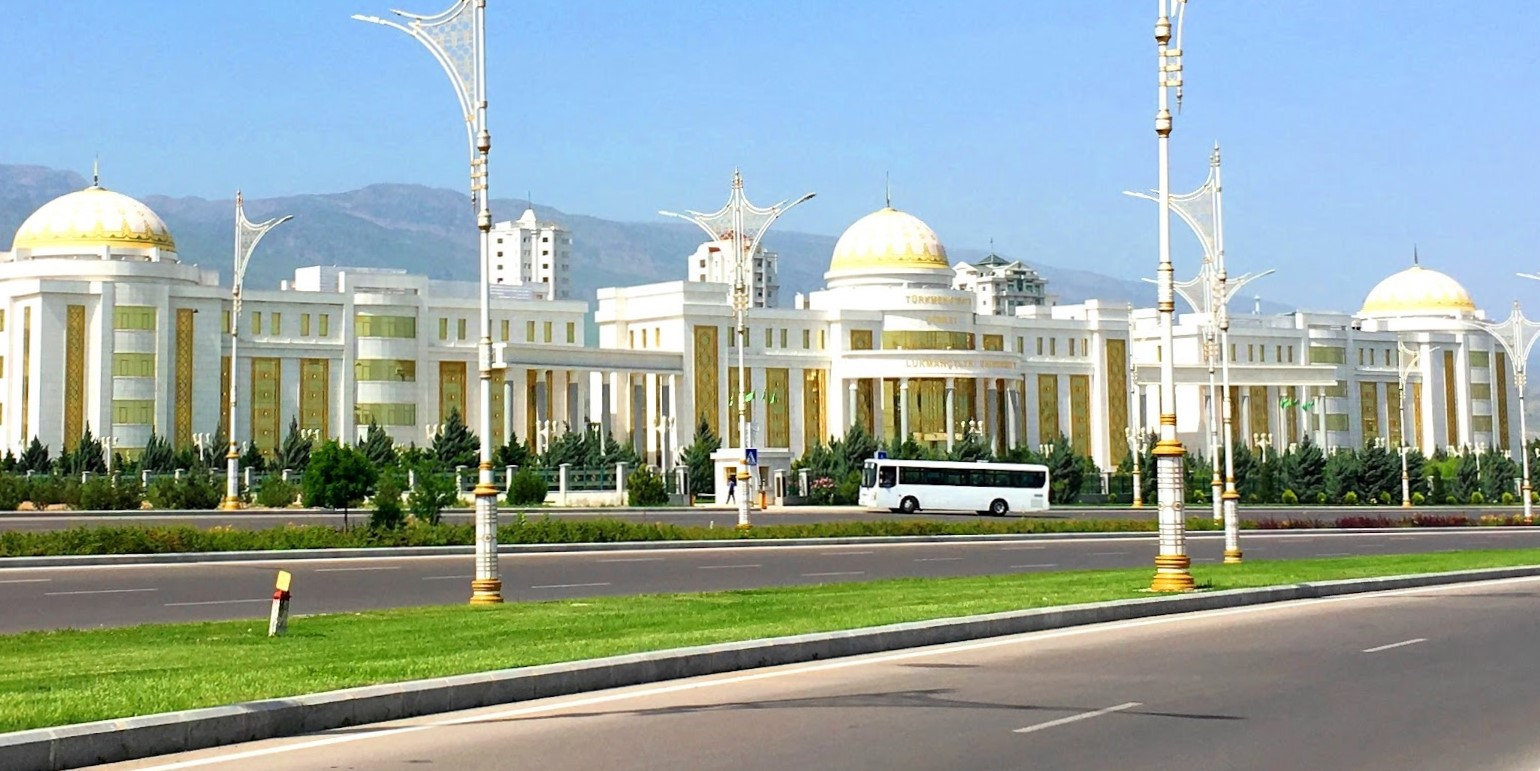
Turkmen State Medical University

Turkmen Institute of Economics and Management in Ashgabat

Ashgabat is the most important educational center of Turkmenistan with several institutions of higher education. Magtymguly Turkmen State University was founded in 1950. The main university building is located on Beýik Saparmyrat Türkmenbaşy şaýoly. Turkmen State Medical University is situated in Ashgabat as well. It is subordinate to the Ministry of Health and Pharmaceutical Industry of Turkmenistan. Other prominent institutions are the Turkmen State Institute of Economics and Management, a main business school founded in 1980, as well as the Turkmen State Institute of Architecture and Construction, Turkmen Agricultural University, and The National Institute of Sports and Tourism of Turkmenistan. In 2016, the English- and Japanese-medium Oguz Khan University of Engineering Technologies was opened with support of the Japanese government. The International University of Humanities and Development is another English-medium institution of higher education. The Ministry of Foreign Affairs' training ground is the Institute of International Relations.

In 2025, the International University of Industrialists and Entrepreneurs opened in Ashgabat. The first private university in the country. It offers paid 5-year programs in fields like construction, agriculture, IT, business, and trade, with instruction in Turkmen and English.

Ashgabat is home to five military academies: the Military Institute, the Naval Institute, the Border Guards Institute, the Institute of National Security, and the Ministry of Internal Affairs Institute. In 2020 the Military Institute began accepting applications from women.

Four international secondary schools operate in Ashgabat. The Russian Embassy sponsors the Russian-medium A.S. Pushkin Russo-Turkmen School, the French construction company Bouygues sponsors a French school for children of its Francophone employees, the Turkish Embassy sponsors the Turkish-medium Turgut Ozal Turkmen-Turkish School, and the American Embassy sponsors the English-medium Ashgabat International School.

Prior to establishment of Soviet authority in Turkmenistan, Ashgabat had only 11 schools and no scientific or research centers. By 1948 Ashgabat had three institutions of higher education, 20 technical schools, 60 libraries, "and approximately the same number of kindergartens".

The Turkmen Academy of Sciences was founded June 29, 1951, and includes the unique Desert Institute among its 26 scientific research institutes, as well as the State Seismological Service, 17-degree-granting schools, two medical research centers, a library, and two print shops. The Academy of Sciences is the only institution in Turkmenistan accredited to award postgraduate degrees. In 2019, President Berdimuhamedow decreed that state funding of the Academy of Sciences would end within three years. Prior to founding of the Turkmen Academy of Sciences, local scientific-research institutes, all located in a single two-story building, were subordinate to the USSR Academy of Sciences.

=== Health ===
Ashgabat is a center for healthcare and medical training of Turkmenistan. Large-scale reconstruction work on buildings and modernization of the material and technical base of existing healthcare institutions is constantly ongoing in the city.

The Directorate of International Medical Centers in Ashgabat includes International Center Ene mähri (maternity hospital), International Center of Endocrinology and Surgery, International Center of Head and Neck Diseases, International Center of Eye Diseases, Ashgabat Dental Center, International Center of Cardiology, International Center of Internal Medicine, International Center of Neurology, International Diagnostic Center, International Education and Science Center, International Diagnostic Center, International Education and Science Center, International Center of Traumatology and International Burn Center. The main medical centers are located along Professor Hans Meissner Avenue in the south of Ashgabat. In 2024, they were opened International Health and Rehabilitation Center, and the International Scientific and Clinical Center of Physiology. In October 2026, the complex was expanded with the International Scientific and Clinical Center of Oncology, the Dental Center, and the International Center of Pediatrics.

Medical and preventive institutions in Ashgabat include: Scientific-Clinical Center of Oncology, Scientific-clinical center for Maternal and Child health, Treatment and Consultative centre named after S.А.Nyýazow, Hospital with Scientific Clinical Centre of Cardiology, Emergency First Aid Center, Central Bureau of Pathologic Anatomy, Central Bureau of Forensic Medicine, Central Medical-Recovery Hospital, Medical Diagnostic Center.

The Directorate of Infectious Disease Centers is located in the Choganly residential complex in the north of Ashgabat, which includes Central Dermatovenerological Hospital, Treatment and prevention Center for infectious diseases, Blood Center, National AIDS Prevention Center, Center for Treatment and Prevention of Tuberculosis and Centralized Laboratory.

The central office of the State Sanitary and Epidemiological Service is located in Ashgabat. The Center for Public Health and Nutrition and the Center for the Prevention of Particularly Dangerous Infections operate in Ashgabat.

As of 2018, there are 16 outpatient clinic's operating in the Ashgabat.

==== Medical education ====
The following higher and secondary medical educational institutions operate in Ashgabat: Turkmen State Medical University named after Myrat Garryev, Indira Gandhi Secondary Medical School of Ashgabat. The following were established at the Turkmen State Medical University: in 2011 – the Scientific and Clinical Center for Eye Diseases, in 2013 – the Educational and Industrial Center for Dentistry, and in 2015 – the Educational and Scientific Center for the Protection of Maternal and Child Health.

==== Medical industry ====
The city pays great attention to the development of the pharmaceutical industry. The following medical industry and pharmaceutical supply institutions operate in Ashgabat: Turkmendermansenagat Association, Main Pharmacy Association, Center for Drug Registration and State Quality Control, Institute of Medicinal Plants, Saglyk Pharmaceutical Enterprise, Türkmen Ajanta Pharma Limited Joint Venture, Tenekär Pharmaceutical Enterprise, Berzengi Mineral Healing Water Enterprise, Disinfectant Solutions Production Enterprise.

==== Sanatoriums ====
The Berzeňňi Sanatorium is located at the foothills of the Kopetdag mountains, 7.5 kilometers south of center of Ashgabat. Operating since 1967, a new building was inaugurated in 2012. The sanatorium features a unique mineral water source from a 1,600-meter-deep well. This water has a distinct hydrochemical composition, including magnesium sulfate, potassium, and low mineralization, and has various therapeutic properties. It is used to treat conditions such as digestive system diseases, hypertension, cardiovascular issues, and joint diseases. The sanatorium operates year-round, offering both outpatient and spa treatments.

== Culture ==
Ashgabat is the cultural hub of Turkmenistan, housing numerous theatres, museums, galleries, concert halls, cinemas, and foreign cultural institutions.

=== Museums and galleries ===
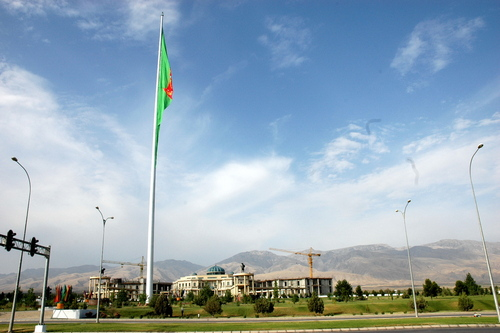
The State Museum of the State Cultural Center of Turkmenistan in front of the Ashgabat Flagpole

The Trans-Caspian Regional Museum, Ashgabat's first museum, opened on 17 March 1899. The National Museum of Turkmenistan opened on 12 November 1998 and was renamed the State Museum of the State Cultural Center of Turkmenistan in 2013. Covering 165,323 m^{2} (1,779,520 sq ft), the main building's ground floor houses exhibits on Turkmen independence, Turkmen carpets, and temporary displays, while the second floor covers Ancient History, Margush, Parthia, and the Middle Ages. The complex also includes the Museum of the President of Turkmenistan (opened June 2009) and the Museum of Ethnography and Local History (opened May 2009), which features 11 natural history sections alongside ethnographic exhibits.

Other major cultural institutions include the Turkmen Fine Arts Museum and the Turkmen Carpet Museum, known for its extensive carpet collection, as well as the Ashgabat National Museum of History, which displays artifacts from the Parthian and Persian eras.

The Watan Mukaddesligi Museum, located within the Halk Hakydasy Memorial Complex in southwestern Ashgabat, opened in 2014. Its four thematic halls contain over 1,000 exhibits documenting the Battle of Geoktepe, World War II, the 1948 Ashgabat earthquake, and modern urban development.

In 2024, the ART-bazar private art gallery opened to showcase regional Turkmen crafts, including ceramics, paintings, felt tapestries, leather goods, and handmade paper.

=== Performing arts ===
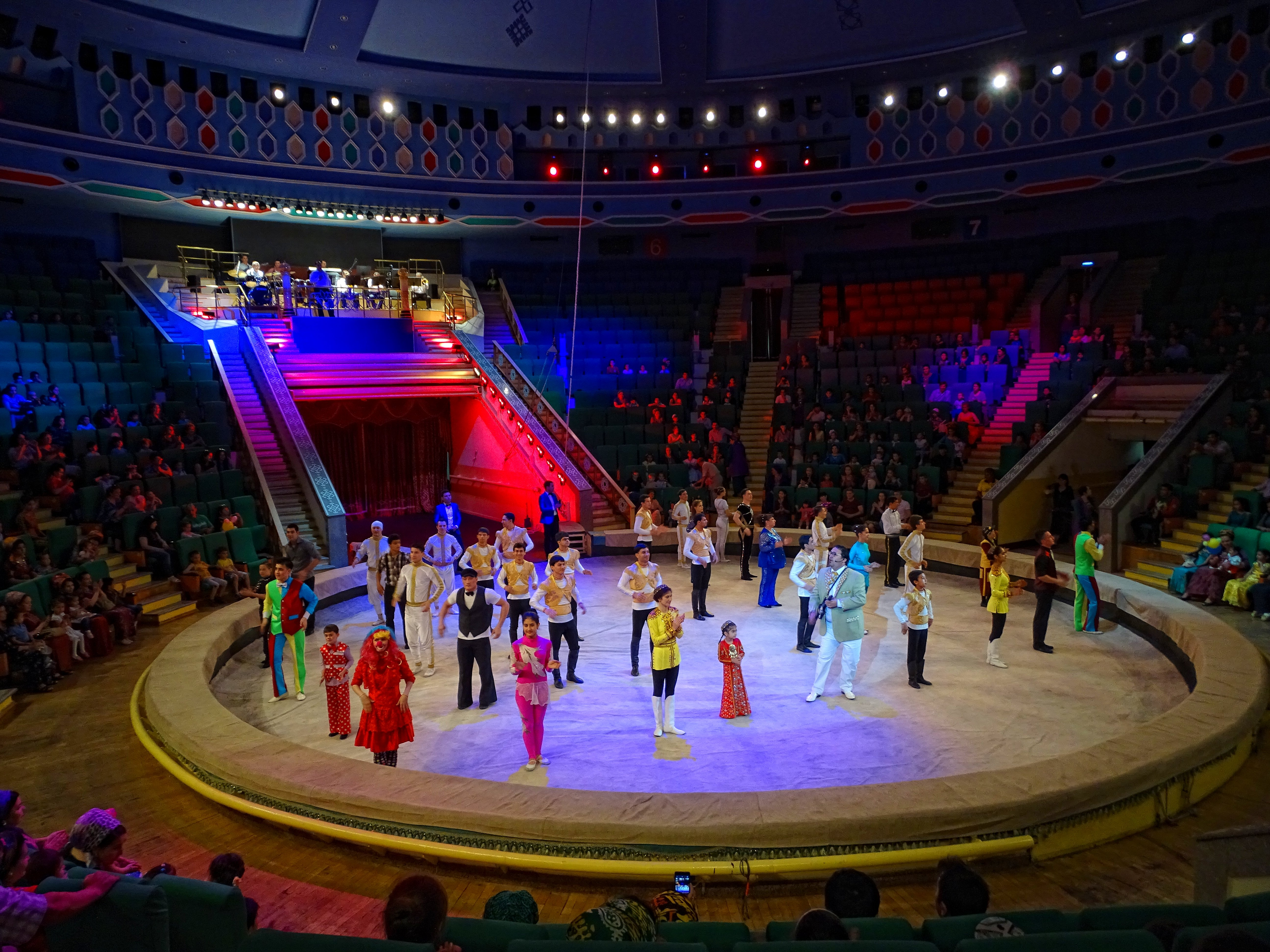
Interior of the Turkmen State Circus

Ashgabat's major venues for performing arts include:

- Alp Arslan National Drama Theatre
- Magtymguly National Musical and Drama Theatre
- Main Drama Theatre named after Saparmurat Turkmenbashi
- Mollanepes Student Theatre
- Mukam Palace
- Pushkin State Russian Drama Theatre
- Theatre "Art Ist"
- Turkmen State Puppet Theatre
- Turkmen State Circus

Former municipalities annexed by Ashgabat also maintain local "houses of culture" (Turkmen: Medeniýet Öýi).

=== Cinemas ===
Ashgabat has six cinemas. The Aşgabat Cinema, opened in 2011, was the country's first 3D cinema. Older venues such as the Watan and Turkmenistan theatres have been renovated, while additional multiplexes operate within the Berkarar, Gül Zemin, and Arkach shopping malls.

=== Libraries ===
The State Library of Turkmenistan, established in 1892, moved to a dedicated facility in 1976 and gained national library status in 1992. Incorporated into the State Culture Center in 2007, it holds over six million items and maintains a digital collection.

The State Children's Library of Turkmenistan, named after Bazar Amanov, was established in 1935 as the national repository for children's literature. Holding more than 250,000 items, it provides services ranging from preschool through high school materials and implemented an integrated electronic library system in 2016.

== Main sights ==
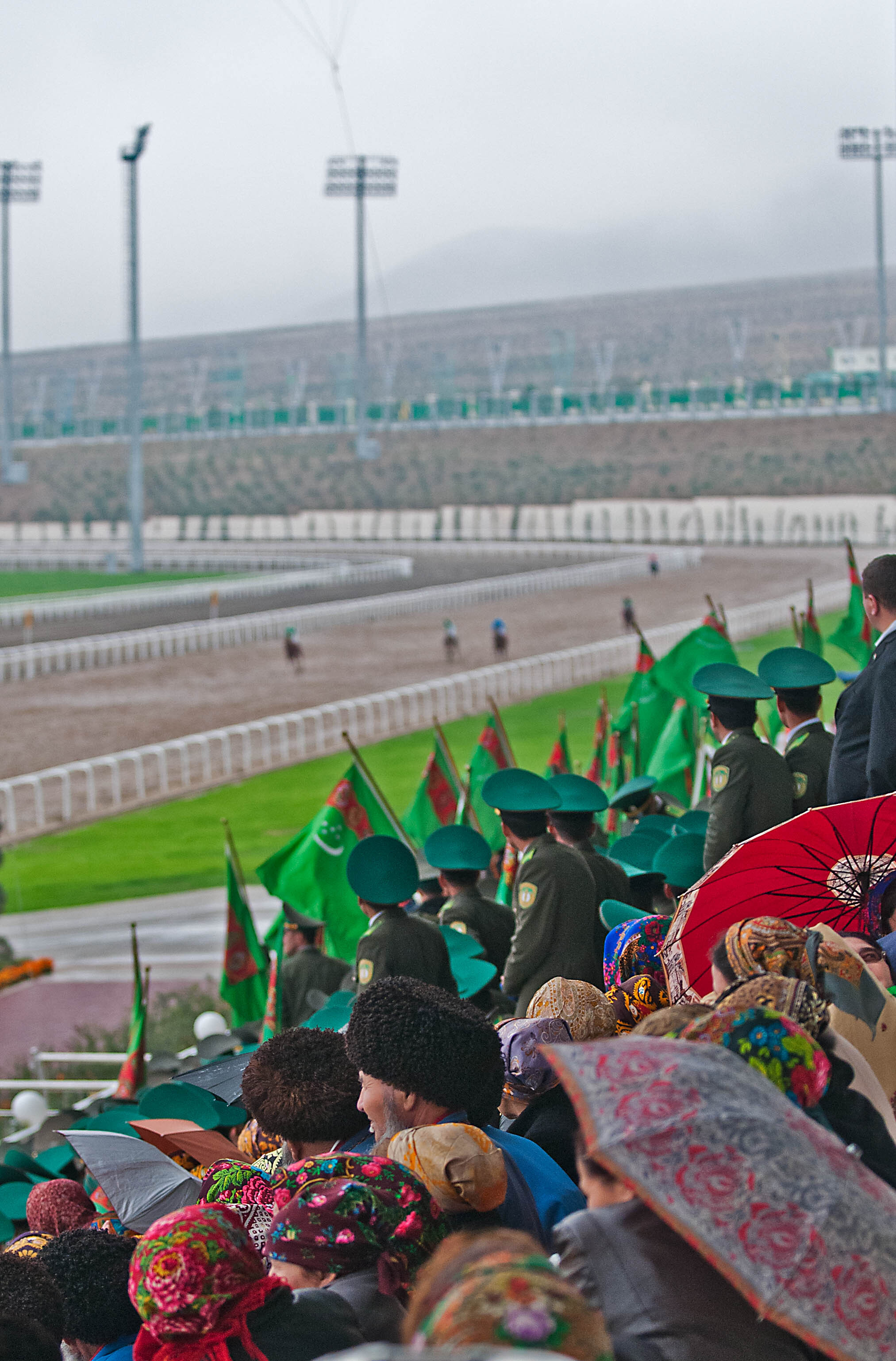
Horse racing at the International Equestrian Sports Complex

Ashgabat was home to the Arch of Neutrality, a 75 m (250 ft) tall tripod crowned by a golden statue of late president Saparmyrat Nyýazow (also known as Türkmenbaşy, or head of the Turkmen). The 15 m (50 ft) high statue, which rotated in order to always face the sun during daylight hours, was removed on August 26, 2010, after Nyýazow's successor, current President Berdimuhamedow, made clear earlier in the year that the statue was to be taken out of Ashgabat's Independence Square. In 2011 a Monument to the Constitution was built, its total height of 185 m (607 ft) makes it the second tallest structure in Turkmenistan.

Alem Cultural and Entertainment Center was recognised by Guinness World Records as the world's tallest Ferris wheel in an enclosed space. The Ashgabat Flagpole is the fifth tallest free–standing flagpole in the world, standing at 436 ft (133 m) tall. The Ashgabat Fountain has the world's greatest number of fountain pools in a public place. Ashgabat also features Turkmenistan Tower which is the tallest tower in Turkmenistan, the decorative octagonal Star of Oguzkhan is recognized as the world's largest architectural image of the star and entered in the Guinness World Records.

=== Palaces ===
- Oguzhan Presidential Palace, the official presidential headquarters.
- Ruhyýet Palace, a place for official state events, forums, meetings, inaugurations.
- Wedding Palace, a civil registry building.

=== Parks and squares ===
Ashgabat has many parks and open spaces, mainly established in the early years of the Independence and well maintained and expanded thereafter. The most important of these parks are: the Botanical Garden, Güneş, Turkmen-Turkish friendship, Independence. The oldest city park, Ashgabat, was founded in 1887 and is colloquially known as First Park. In the center of Ashgabat is the Inspiration Alley, an art-park complex which is a favorite place for many locals. The amusement park World of Turkmenbashi Tales is a local equivalent to Disneyland. Squares: 10 Years of Turkmenistan Independence, Magtymguly, Eternal Flame, Zelili, Chyrchyk, Garashsyzlyk, March 8, Gerogly, Dolphin, 15 years of Independence, Ruhyýet, 10 ýyl Abadançylyk, Ylham and Tashkent.

The Ashgabat Botanical Garden was founded on 1 October 1929, and is the oldest botanical garden in Central Asia. It covers a territory of approximately 18 hectares, and contains a live exhibition of more than 500 different species of plants coming from various parts of the world.

==== Halk Hakydasy Memorial Complex ====
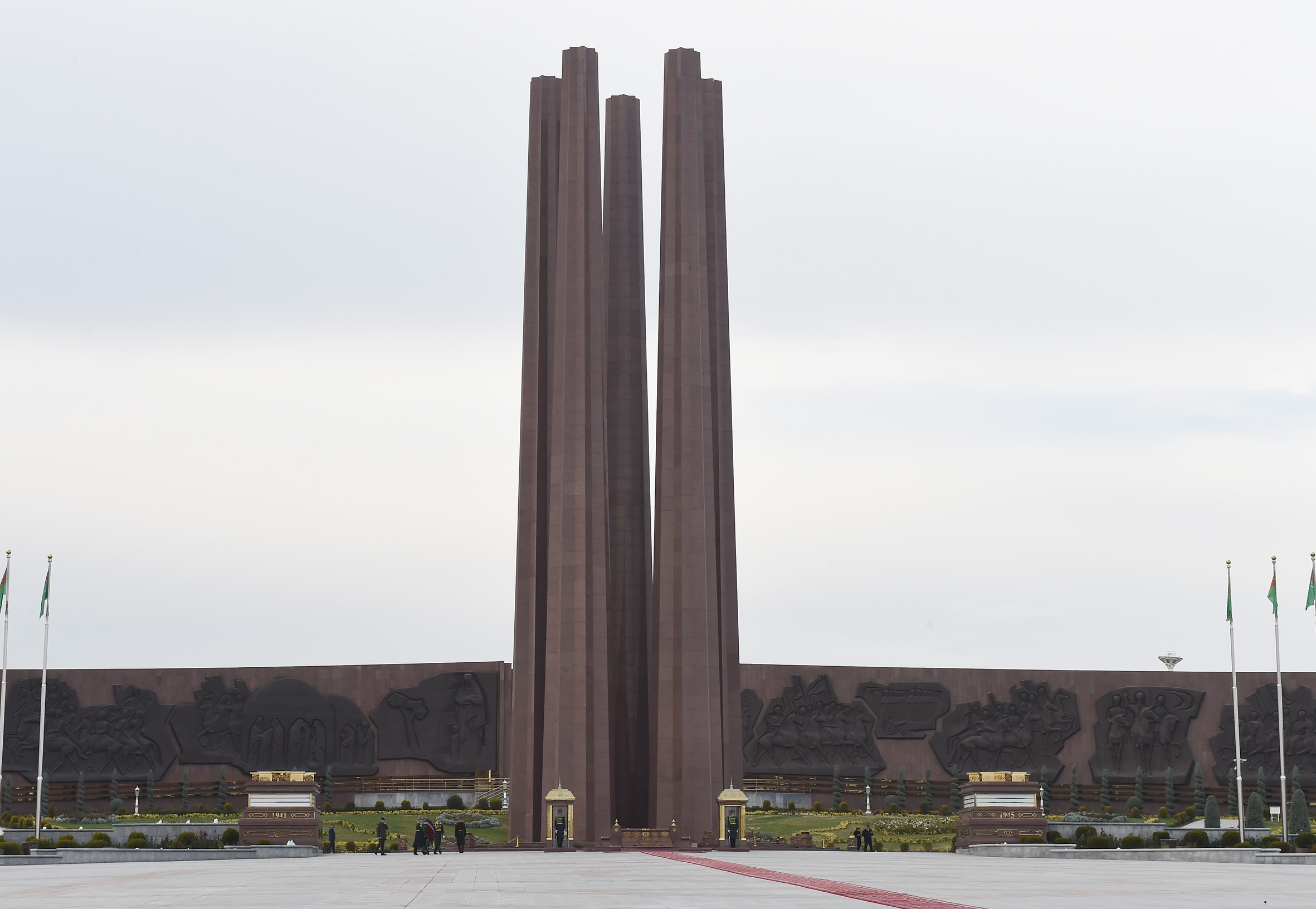
Halk Hakydasy Memorial Complex

Halk Hakydasy Memorial Complex was opened in 2014 in remembrance of those killed in the Battle of Geok Tepe in 1881, during World War II, and to commemorate of the victims of the 1948 Ashgabat earthquake. It is located in the southwestern part of the city on Bekreve street.

==== Magtymguly Pyragy Cultural and Park Complex ====
In 2024, monuments dedicated to 24 foreign writers and poets were erected in the Magtymguly Pyragy Cultural and Park Complex in Ashgabat. These statues honor renowned figures such as Sayat-Nova, Yanka Kupala, Du Fu, Honoré de Balzac, Shota Rustaveli, Johann Wolfgang von Goethe, Sándor Petőfi, Rabindranath Tagore, Hafez Shirazi, Dante Alighieri, Yasunari Kawabata, Kurmangazy Sagyrbayuly, Chingiz Aitmatov, Raja Ali Haji, Adam Mickiewicz, Mihai Eminescu, Fyodor Dostoevsky, Juan Jiménez, Sayido Nasafiy, Yunus Emre, Hryhorii Skovoroda, William Shakespeare, Langston Hughes and Alisher Navoi. Each sculpture captures the essence and unique spirit of the artist's work.

=== Mosques ===
Interior of Artogrul Gazy Mosque

Major mosques in Ashgabat include:

- Türkmenbaşy Ruhy Mosque
- Ärtogrul Gazy Mosque, a gift from Turkey, was inaugurated in 1998 and resembles the Blue Mosque in Istanbul.
- Hezreti Osman Mosque in the 8th microdistrict
- Hezreti Omar Mosque in the Parahat 7 microdistrict
- Azadi Mosque on Zarpçi street
- Martyrs (Turkmen: Şehitler) Mosque on Görogly street
- Shia Mosque near the Iranian Embassy

There are also several mosques in former towns and villages annexed by Ashgabat and thus now neighborhoods within the city limits.

=== Churches ===
Ashgabat has five operating Christian churches. Four are Russian Orthodox churches:

- Saint Alexander Nevsky Church, founded in 1882 as parish church of the Russian military garrison, consecrated in 1900, located in the 30th Microdistrict (Russian: Храм святого благоверного великого князя Александра Невского)
- Temple of Saint Nicholas the Miracle-Worker, located inside the Khitrovka Cemetery (Russian: храм святителя и Чудотворца Николая)
- Temple of the Resurrection of Jesus Christ, located near the Ruhnama School (Russian: храм Воскресения Христова)
- Temple of the Holy Equals to Apostles Cyril and Methodius, located in Büzmeýin (Russian: Храм святых равноапостольных Кирилла и Мефодия)

The Roman Catholic Chapel of the Transfiguration operates on the grounds of the Apostolic nunciature.

Other Christian denominations exist but as of 2019 only two were registered with the government and thus able to operate legally. The U.S. Department of State reported that Turkmen authorities "scrutinize or obstruct religious groups attempting to purchase or lease buildings or land for religious purposes".

== Sports ==
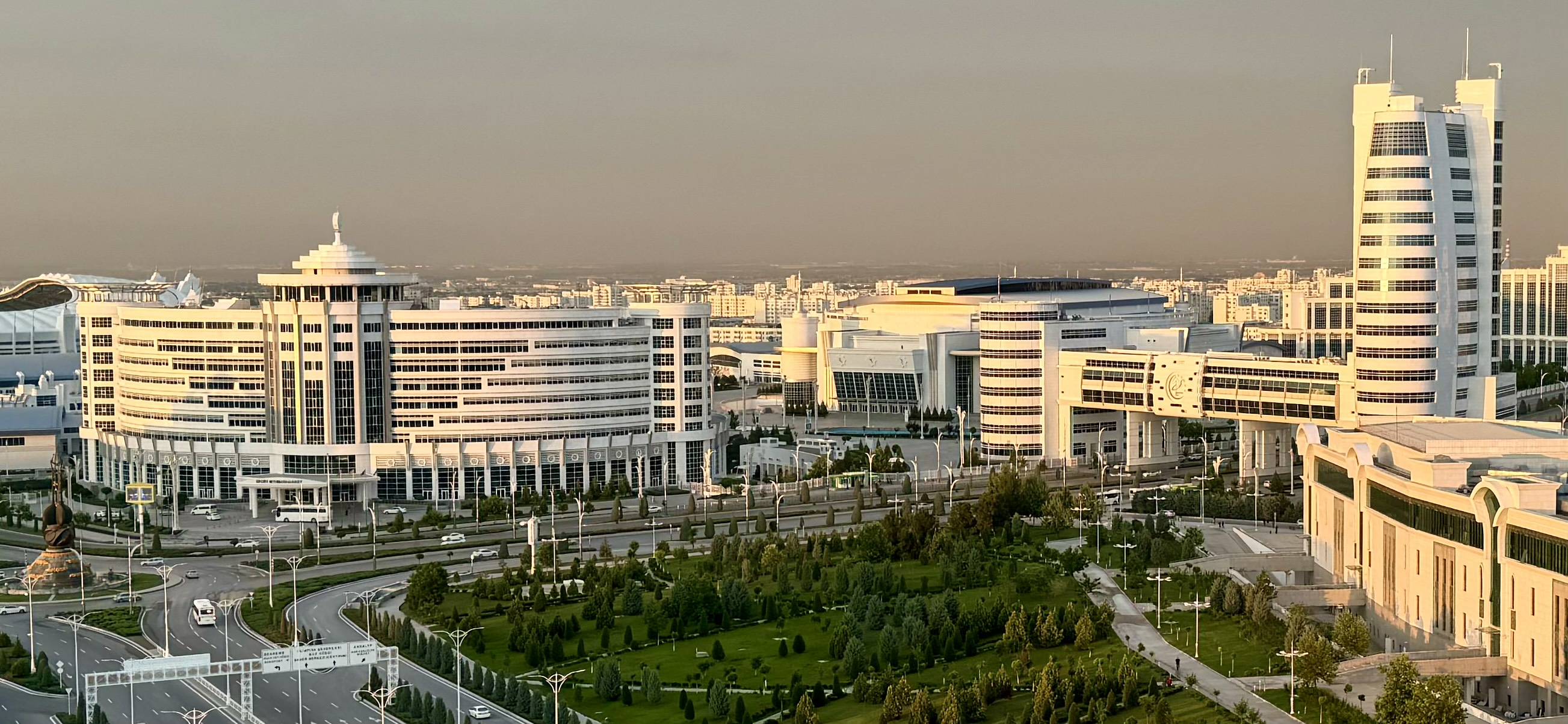
Ashgabat Olympic Complex

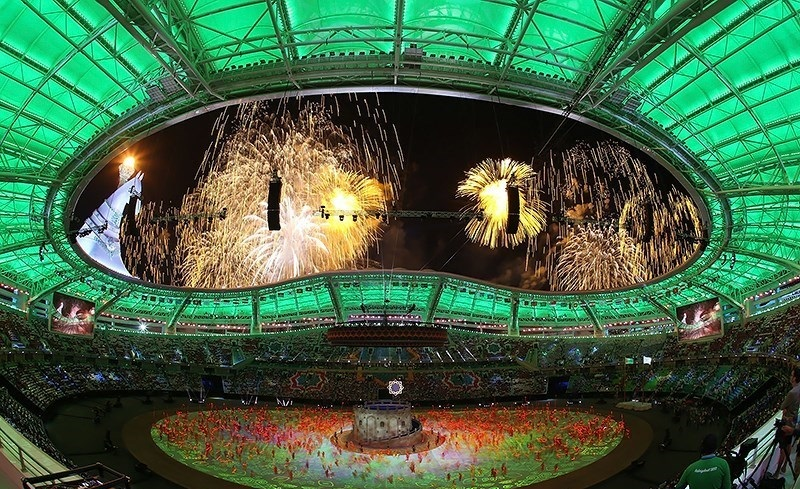
Olympic Stadium in Ashgabat

The main sporting venues in Ashgabat are the Olympic Stadium, Ashgabat Stadium, the National Olympic ice rink, Sports complex for winter sports and the Ashgabat Watersports Complex.

Ashgabat was chosen as the host city of the 2017 Asian Indoor and Martial Arts Games. Between 2010 and 2017 an Olympic Village was built by the Turkish firm Polimeks south of the city center, at a cost of $5 billion.

In October 2017 a Jack Nicklaus Designs Signature 18-hole golf course opened in Ashgabat. It features 82 sand traps and covers 70 hectares.

Ashgabat was the host of the 2018 IWF World Weightlifting Championships and 2023 World Kurash Championships.

The city's professional football clubs Altyn Asyr FK, FC Aşgabat and FK Köpetdag Aşgabat play in the Ýokary Liga, the top league of Turkmenistan.

Ashgabat is home to several professional ice hockey teams. Galkan, Merdana, Nesil, Shir, Oguzkhan, Watanchy play in the Turkmenistan Hockey Championship. Ashgabat annually hosts the President of the Turkmeinistan Cup ice hockey tournament. There are three ice arenas in Ashgabat: Winter Sports Complex Ashgabat (10,300 seats capacity), Ashgabat Ice Palace (1000 seats) and Galkan Ice Palace (630 seats).

Inha Babakova, 1999 World High Jump champion, was born in Ashgabat. Born in Ashgabat weightlifter Polina Guryeva captured Turkmenistan's first Olympic medal at the 2020 Summer Olympics, taking silver in the women's 59 kg.

== International relations ==
=== Diplomatic missions ===
The city hosts 32 foreign embassies and serves as the headquarters for the International Fund for Saving the Aral Sea and United Nations Regional Centre for Preventive Diplomacy for Central Asia (UNRCCA).

=== Twin towns – sister cities ===
Ashgabat is twinned with:

- Aktau, Kazakhstan
- Albuquerque, United States (1990)
- Ankara, Turkey (1994)
- Astana, Kazakhstan (2017)
- Athens, Greece
- Bamako, Mali (1974)
- Bishkek, Kyrgyzstan (2018)
- Dushanbe, Tajikistan (2017)
- Kyiv, Ukraine (2001)
- Lanzhou, China (1992)
- Tashkent, Uzbekistan (2017)
- San Bartolomé de la Torre, Spain (2025)
- Ulaanbaatar, Mongolia (2025)

=== Partner cities ===
Ashgabat cooperates with:

- Moscow, Russia (1996)
- Chelyabinsk Oblast, Russia (1997)
- Yerevan, Armenia (2014)
- Tokyo, Japan (2014)

== See also ==
- Ashgabat Trauma Center
- Boroughs and landmarks of Ashgabat
  - Bagtyýarlyk District
  - Berkararlyk District
  - Bitarap Turkmenistan Avenue
  - Büzmeýin (Abadan)
  - Büzmeýin District
  - Galkynysh Square, Ashgabat
  - Gypjak
  - Independence Square, Ashgabat
  - Kopetdag District
  - Magtymguly Avenue
  - Saparmurat Turkmenbashy Avenue
- List of cities in Turkmenistan
- OpenStreetMap wiki article on geography of Ashgabat
- Russian Turkestan
