= 1948 Fukui earthquake =

June 1948 earthquake in Japan

- 福井地震
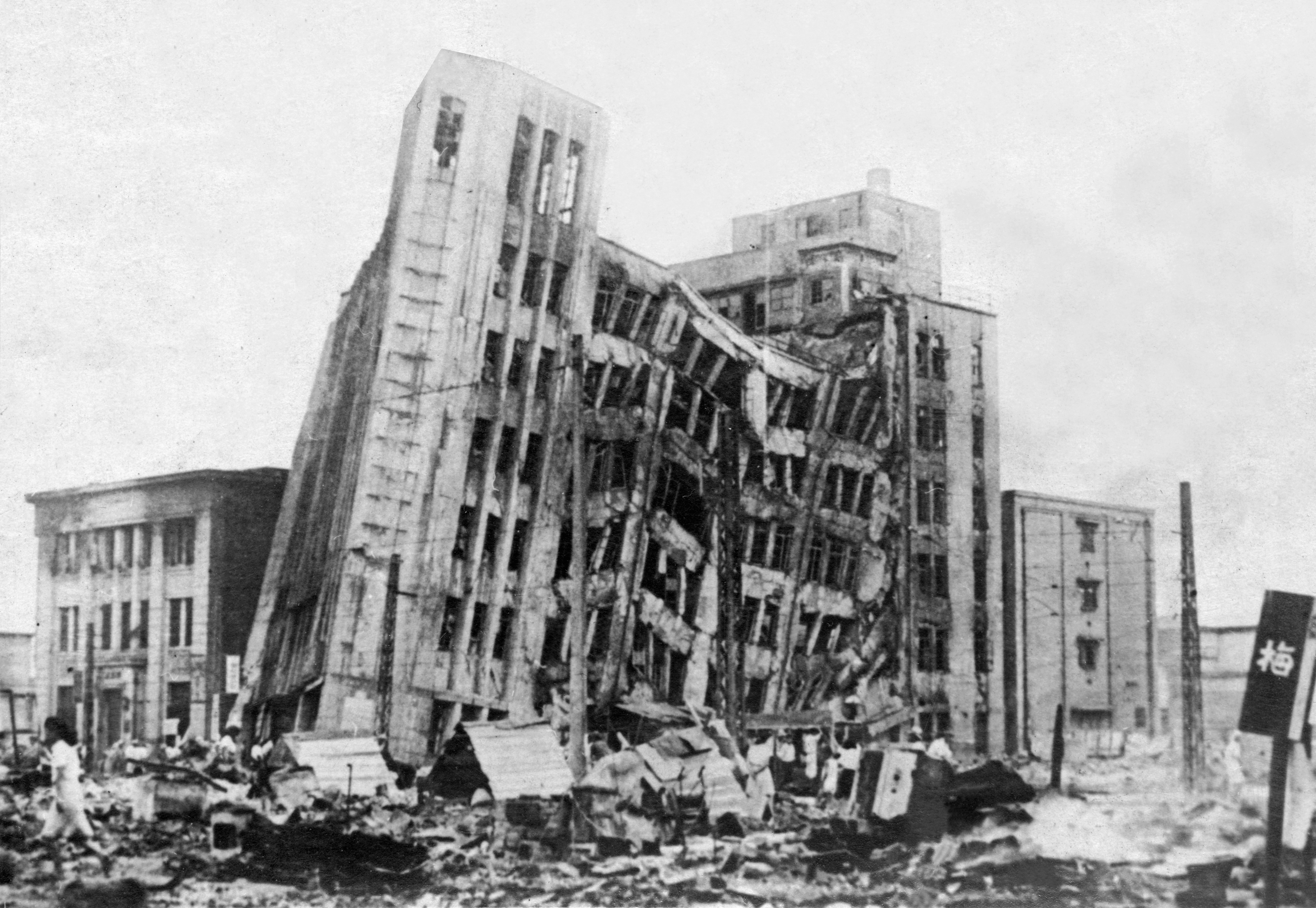

- Location within Japan Location within Fukui Prefecture
- UTC time: 1948-06-28 07:13:31
- ISC event: 897413
- USGS-ANSS: ComCat
- Local date: June 28, 1948
- Local time: 16:13:31 JST
- Magnitude: 6.8 M_{w}
- Depth: 10 km (6.2 mi)
- Epicenter: 36.16°N 136.22°E
- Type: Intraplate earthquake
- Areas affected: Japan
- Total damage: US$1 billion
- Max. intensity: MMI IX (Violent); JMA 6 (now equivalent to JMA 7)
- Casualties: 3,769 dead 22,203 injured

The 1948 Fukui earthquake (福井地震, Fukui jishin) occurred in Fukui Prefecture, Japan. The magnitude 6.8 quake struck at 4:13:31 p.m.(JDT) on June 28, 1948. The quake's hypocenter was approximately 10 km north-northeast of Fukui, in the present-day neighborhood of Maruoka, Sakai City. The strongest shaking occurred in the city of Fukui, where it was recorded as 6 (equivalent to the current 7) on the Japan Meteorological Agency seismic intensity scale.

== Overview ==
The earthquake devastated Fukui, which was still recovering from damage sustained during WWII air raids in July 1945. Damage across the entire Fukuiheiya flood plain into neighboring Ishikawa prefecture. Official casualty estimates totaled 3,769 dead and 22,000 wounded, with more than 36,000 buildings completely destroyed. In the Kanazugocho district (modern-day eastern Awara); Maruoka and Harue; and Yoshida District, nearly every building was leveled. In central Fukui city, which was adjacent to the epicenter, approximately 79% of structures were completely destroyed, while the overall destruction rate across the Fukuiheiya floodplain surpassed 60%. Fires caused by the earthquake compounded the destruction.

The quake also seriously damaged the embankments of the Kuzuryū River. Record-setting rain in the weeks following the quake subsequently caused the levees to burst, leading to massive flooding.

Although three years of war damage, earthquake damage, fire damage, and flood damage reduced the city to ashes, it continued to rebuild. In honor of the citizens' resilience, the Fukui citizen's charter proclaims Fukui "City of the Phoenix."

== Geology ==
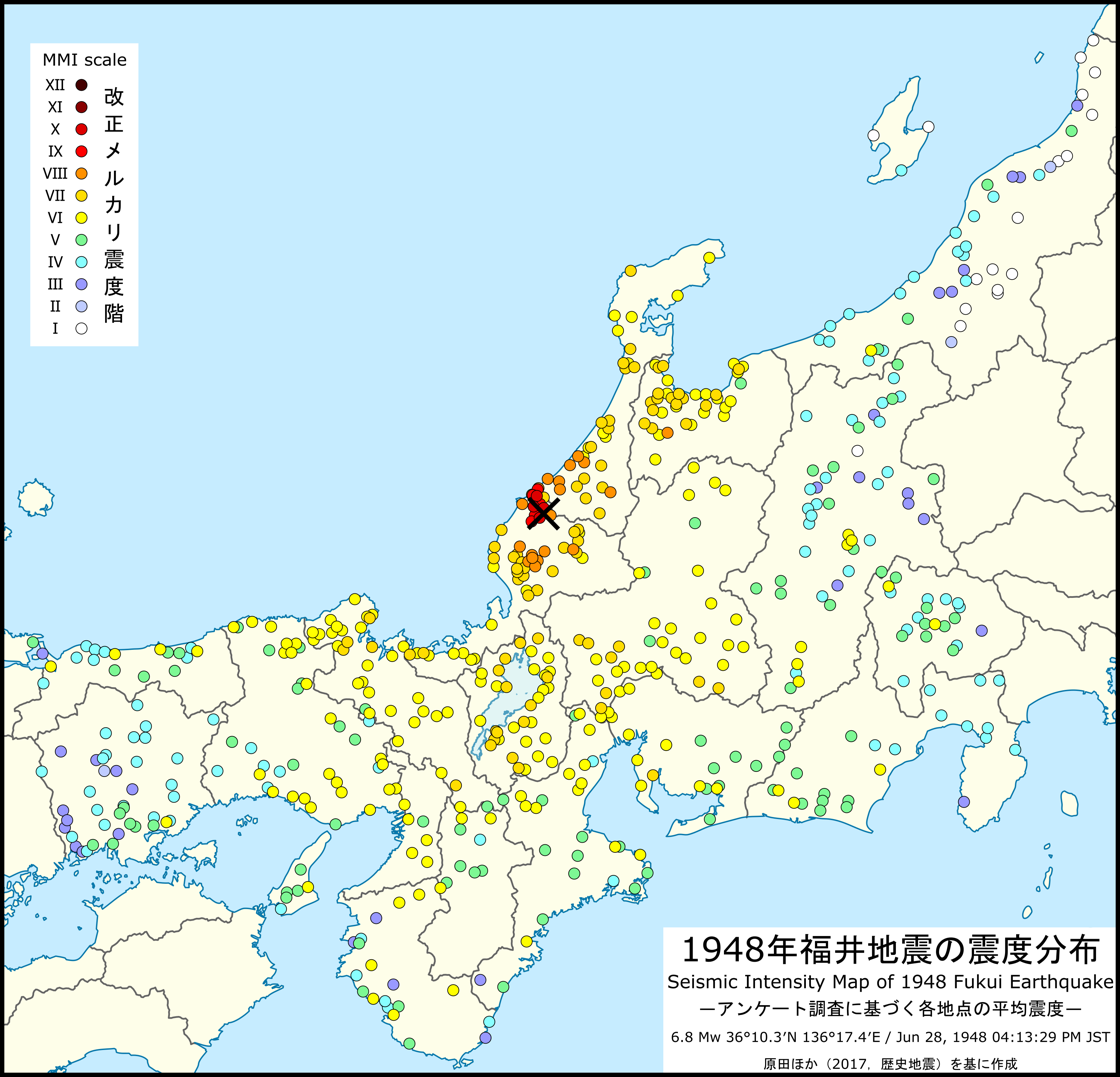
Seismic intensity map of 1948 Fukui earthquake

This earthquake was caused by a previously unknown strike-slip fault. The fault stretches from Kanazu to Fukui, with a length of 25 km (16 mi), and was later named the "Fukui Earthquake Fault". Shaking was felt as far as Mito in the east, and Saga in the west.

== Damage ==
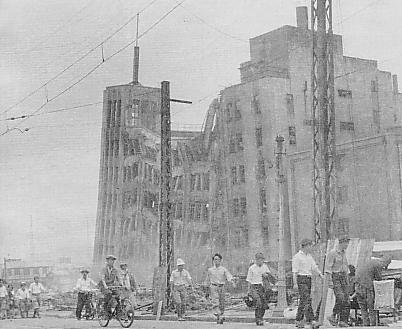
Daiwa department store after the earthquake

Damage was most reported in the Fukui plain, where the building collapse rate was more than 60%, since shaking became larger due to it being an alluvial plain, and many of the buildings were just built after the war and a little unstable.

As many people were cooking when the earthquake struck, many fires spread after the quake. Since the roads and the waterworks were damaged it took five days to put out the fires and so the fires caused devastating damage.

Even though the Daiwa Department Store collapsed, the Fukui Bank building right next to it had no significant damage. It is thought to have been because the Fukui Bank building had about 500 deep foundation pipes 10 meters deep in the ground.

Almost all of the farmers' houses in the epicenter area collapsed, but most of the farmers were outside so there were not many casualties.

Total damage
Prefecture	Casualties		Damaged houses		
Prefecture	Deaths	Injuries	Collapsed	Half collapsed	Burned
Fukui	3,728	21,750	35,382	10,542	3,851
Ishikawa	41	453	802	1,274	0
Total	3,769	22,203	36,184	11,816	3,851

=== Damage in Fukui City ===
Total damage in Fukui City
Dead	930
Collapsed buildings	12,270
Half collapsed buildings	3,158
Burnt buildings	2,069
Building collapse rate	79.0%
Fires	24
Burnt area	2,120,600 m^{2}

=== Casualties ===
At the time, it was the deadliest earthquake after the Pacific War (now superseded by the Great Hanshin earthquake and the Tōhoku earthquake and tsunami). This earthquake killed 3769 people, mainly in Sakai City (then part of Fukui City), where the death rate was more than 1%.

=== Property damage ===
- Maruoka Castle collapsed.
- Hosorogi Station and Kanazu Station (now Awaraonsen Station) collapsed.
- The Daiwa Department Store collapsed.
- A theater in Fukui collapsed and caught fire, killing a few hundred people.

=== Other ===
- Levees damaged by the earthquake and torrential rains caused Kuzuryū River to overflow.

== Influence ==
- The Japan Meteorological Agency added Shindo 7 to the Japan Meteorological Agency seismic intensity scale.

== Media coverage ==
LIFE photographer Carl Mydans was the only American correspondent in Fukui when the earthquake struck. His written and photographic account of the disaster was the lead news story in the magazine's 12 July 1948 issue.

== See also ==
- List of earthquakes in 1948
- List of earthquakes in Japan
