= Honda Narishige =

Japanese samurai (1571-1647)

- 本多 成重
- Born: 1571; Hamamatsu, Totomi Province, Japan
- Died: July 25, 1647 (aged 75–76); Maruoka Castle, Japan
- Burial place: Sakai, Fukui, Japan
- Title: Daimyō of Maruoka Domain
- Predecessor: -none-
- Successor: Honda Shigeyoshi
- Spouse: daughter of Nanbu Toshimochi
- Parents: Honda Shigetsugu (father); daughter of Torii Tadayoshi (mother)

Honda Narishige (本多 成重) (1571 – July 25, 1647) was a Japanese samurai of the late Sengoku period through early Edo period, who served the Tokugawa clan; he later became a daimyō. Narishige was born at Hamamatsu Castle, the son of Tokugawa retainer Honda Shigetsugu. His mother was a daughter of Torii Tadayoshi. His courtesy title was Hida-no-kami, and his court rank was Junior Fifth Rank, Lower Grade.

Together with his father, he served in the armies of Tokugawa Ieyasu. During the 1575 Battle of Nagashino, he was famous for having written a brief letter to his wife, telling her to be careful to put of the fire and to feed his horses. Following Ieyasu's submission to Toyotomi Hideyoshi in the wake of the Komaki Campaign in 1584, Narishige was sent to Kyoto as a hostage. After supporting Ieyasu during the Battle of Sekigahara, his holding of 2,000 koku in Omi Province was increased to 5,000 koku in 1602. He was made karō of Ieyasu's son Matsudaira Tadanao in 1613 min Echizen Province, and received the 40,000 koku fief of Maruoka. Narishige also served during the 1614 and 1615 Sieges of Osaka. Soon after, when Tadanao was exiled by bakufu order, Narishige became an independent daimyo in his own right. His income was increased to 46,300 koku in 1623, and he spent the ensuing years strengthening his domain's political and logistical infrastructure, rebuilding the jōkamachi of Maruoka along a grid pattern, and improving its waterworks..

Narishige retired in early 1646, and yielded family headship to his son Shigeyoshi. He died in 1647, at age 76.

Preceded by none	1st Daimyō of Maruoka (Honda); 1613–1646	Succeeded by Honda Shigeyoshi
