= Maruoka Domain Battery =

- 丸岡藩砲台跡 (Japanese)
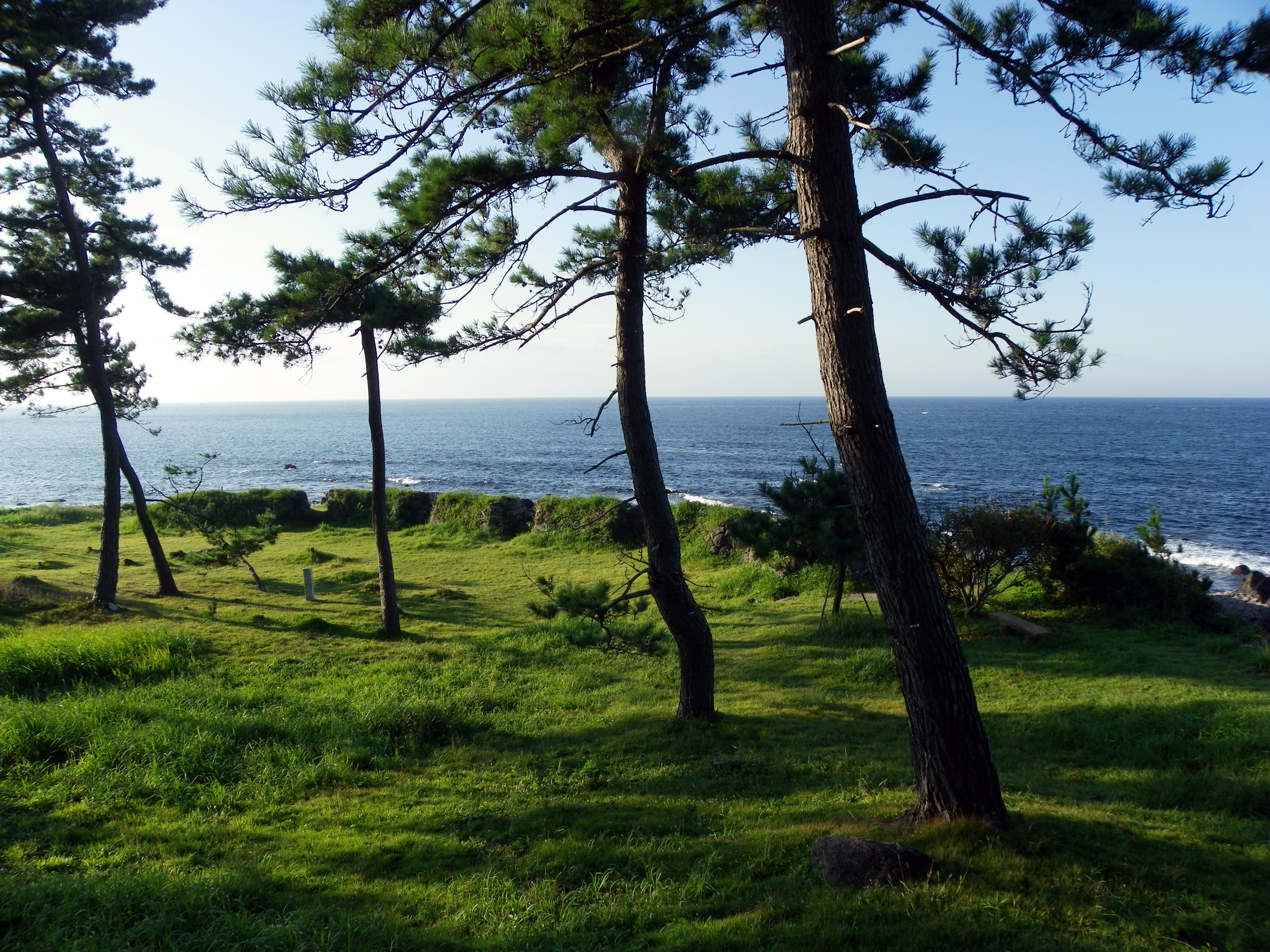
- Maruoka Domain Battery Site

- Location within Fukui Prefecture Location within Japan
- 36°15′11.4″N 136°9′14″E
- Type: fortification
- Location: Sakai, Fukui, Japan

History
- Built: 1852
- Demolished: 1871
- National Historic Site of Japan

The Maruoka Domain Battery (丸岡藩砲台跡, Maruoka-han Hōdai-ato) was a Bakumatsu period coastal artillery battery erected by Maruoka Domain on the Sea of Japan coast in the Mikuni neighborhood of the Mikuni neighborhood of the city of Sakai, Fukui in the Hokuriku region of northern Japan. The ruins were designated a National Historic Site in 1930. It is also called the Kaji Daiba (梶台場) after its location on Kaji Bay.

== Background ==
In the late Edo period, the Tokugawa shogunate was increasing alarmed by incursions by foreign ships into Japanese territorial waters, fearing that these kurofune warships of the United States or other Western powers would attempt to end Japan's self-imposed national isolation policy by force, or would attempt an invasion of Japan by landing hostile military forces. Numerous feudal domains were ordered to establish fortifications along their coastlines with shore artillery located at strategic locations. The most powerful daimyō of Echizen Domain, Matsudaira Yoshinaga was at the time a hard-line supporter of the sonnō jōi movement, and quickly responded by placing 26 cannons in several batteries along his coastline in 1848. Also within Echizen Province, Maruoka Domain was quick to emulate this example, completing this battery in February 1852, shortly before the arrival of the Perry Expedition at Uraga. Several other batteries were planned, but the dire straits of the domain's finances did not permit construction.

The daimyō of Maruoka Domain, Arima Michizumi, enlisted the assistance of military engineer Egawa Hidetatsu, the builder of the Odaiba fortifications in Edo for assistance. Kurihara Genzaimon, the domain's gunnery expert, was a student western-style artillery under Takashima Shuhan, and assisted in the construction. In 1866, the domain remodeled it military, changing its samurai into a western-style force armed with rifles.

== Design ==
The Maruoka battery was a bow-shaped earthen rampart with a height of 1.8 metres (5.9 ft), faced with stone on its inner and side surfaces. It is located on a small plateau protruding into the Sea of Japan with an elevation of 30 meters above sea level. The rampart was in the form of a redan with an open back, with a width of 6 metres (20 ft) and length of 33 metres (108 ft).The rampart had five crenellations at equal intervals approximately 4.5 meters apart to permit the installation of five cannon. The site is located about a 10-minute walk from the "Kajiura" bus stop on the Keifuku bus from Awaraonsen Station on the JR West Hokuriku Main Line.

== See also ==
- List of Historic Sites of Japan (Fukui)
