= Maruoka Castle =

Japanese castle in Fukui Prefecture

Maruoka Castle 丸岡城
- Sakai, Fukui Prefecture, Japan
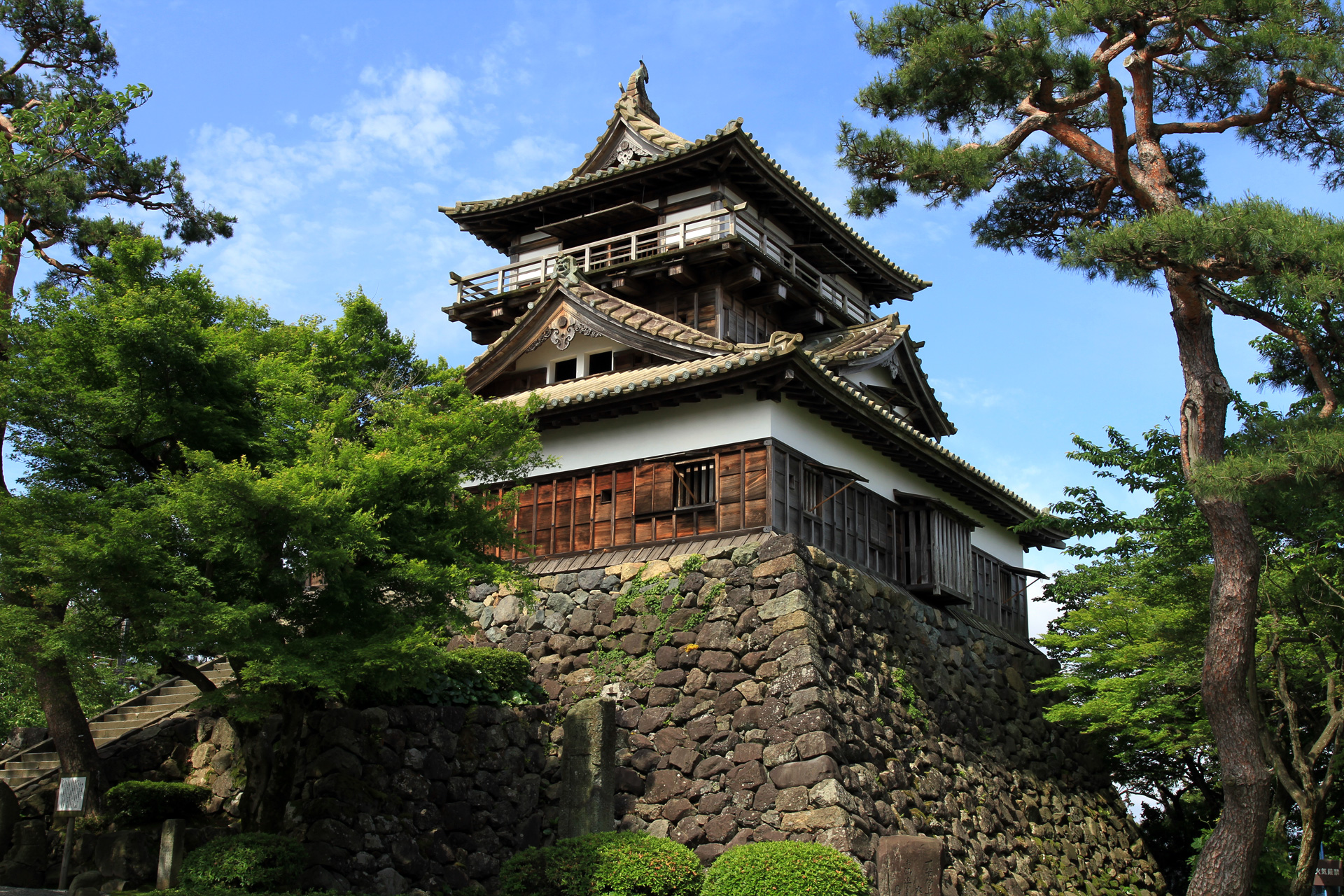
- Donjon of Maruoka Castle

Site information
- Type: hirayama-style Japanese castle
- Open to the public: Yes

Location
- Location within Fukui Prefecture Location within Japan
- Coordinates: 36°09′08″N 136°16′20″E

Site history
- Built: 1576
- Built by: Shibata Katsutoyo
- In use: Sengoku-Edo period
- Demolished: 1871
- Important Cultural Property

Maruoka Castle (丸岡城, Maruoka-jō) is a hirayama-style Japanese castle located in the Maruoka neighbourhood of the city of Sakai, Fukui Prefecture, in the Hokuriku region of Japan. It also called Kasumi-ga-jō (霞ヶ城, Mist Castle) due to the legend that whenever an enemy approaches the castle, a thick mist appears and hides it. Built at the end of the Sengoku period, the castle was occupied by a succession of daimyō of Maruoka Domain under the Edo period Tokugawa shogunate. The site is now a public park noted for its sakura. The castle's relatively small tenshu (castle keep) claims to be the oldest in the country, a claim which is challenged by both Inuyama Castle and Matsumoto Castle.

== Background ==
Maruoka Castle is located on top of a small hill in the plains north of the city of Fukui. The area around the foot of the hill was levelled, and protected by ramparts and a pentagonal-shaped moat. The castle is located on the Hokurikudō highway connecting Kaga Province with Echizen Province, at the juncture of the Mino Kaidō highway connecting inland Mino Province with the Sea of Japan.

== History ==
=== Construction ===
Maruoka Castle is considered to have been constructed in 1576 by Shibata Katsutoyo, who was the nephew and adopted son of Shibata Katsuie, one of Oda Nobunaga's leading generals.

According to the legend of "O-shizu Hitobashira" the castle was constructed with a human pillar. During construction the stone base of the tenshu kept collapsing no matter how many times it was piled up. A vassal suggested that they should make someone a human sacrifice (hitobashira) to appease the gods. O-shizu, a one-eyed woman who had two children and lived a poor life, was selected. She resolved to become the sacrifice on the condition that one of her children be taken in by Katsutoyo and made a samurai. Standing in position the base stones were positioned around her, until they eventually crushed her to death. Her sacrifice allowed the construction to be successfully completed. Katsutoyo was however unable to fulfil his promise to O-shizu before he moved to another province. Resentful that her son had not been made a samurai her spirit according to legend would make the moat overflow with spring rain when the season of cutting algae came in April every year. People called it, "the rain caused by the tears of O-shizu's sorrow" and erected a small tomb to soothe her spirit. There was a poem handed down, "The rain which falls when the season of cutting algae comes Is the rain reminiscent of the tears of the poor O-shizu's sorrow".

Although built in the Momoyama period (1575-1600) the design is more indicative of earlier fortresses of the Sengoku period (1477-1575) . As it was being sited on top of a low hill it was decided to mount the tenshu on a high stone base in order to gain additional height. However at the time successful techniques of constructing such a steep faced base were still in their infancy, especially when using rough uncut stones (known as nozurazumi) in a steeply inclined base as adopted at Maruoka. This random-style piling of stones is suggested as the source of the instability in the walls during the construction period.

=== Tokugawa shogunate ===
After Shibata Katsutoyo died of illness during the Battle of Shizugatake in 1583, the castle was given to the Aoyama clan. However, the Aoyama sided with the Western Army under Ishida Mitsunari during the Battle of Sekigahara and were thus dispossessed by the victorious Tokugawa Ieyasu. Ieyasu awarded Echizen Province to his son, Yūki Hideyasu, who in turn created a 26,000 koku holding centered at Maruoka for his retainer, Imamura Moritsugu. In 1613, due to an O-Ie Sōdō within Fukui Domain, the Tokugawa shogunate raised Maruoka Domain to 40,000 koku and assigned it to Honda Narishige, the son of Honda Shigetsugu, one of Ieyasu's leading generals. Due to Honda Narishige's efforts at the Siege of Osaka in 1614, the kokudaka of the domain was further raised to 46,300 koku. His son and grandson completed the castle and the surrounding jōkamachi. However, his great-grandson, Honda Shigemasu was an alcoholic and incompetent, and was dispossessed by the shogunate in 1695. The Honda were replaced by Arima Kiyosumi, a descendant of the Kirishitan daimyō Arima Harunobu. The Arima clan continued to rule Maruoka for eighth generations until the abolition of the han system in July 1871 during the Meiji restoration.

=== Meiji restoration ===
After the Meiji restoration, almost all Japanese castle keeps and many other castle buildings around the country were demolished. In the case of Maruoka while many of the castle buildings were demolished and various gates, stone walls, and trees were sold off, the tenshu and castle grounds was purchased in 1901 by the town of Maruoka and became a park. The pentagonal moat surrounding the castle was gradually filled in and partly built between the late Taishō era to the early Shōwa era.

The tenshu was registered as a National Treasure on 30 January 1934. The tenshu collapsed due to the destruction of its stone base during the 1948 Fukui earthquake. In 1955 the base was rebuilt using 70% of the original pillars and about 60% of the original beams by installing a reinforced concrete frame and piling the original stones around it before re-erecting the tenshu on top. At that time, the structure of the windows on the top floor was changed from sliding doors to push-up windows.

The castle was re-designated an Important Cultural Property in 1950 under the revised Law for Protection of Cultural Properties. A number of the castle gates also survive in private hands, including one at the temple of Kōzen-ji in Komatsu, Ishikawa and one at the temple of Renshō-ji in the city of Awara, Fukui.

=== Investigations into its construction date ===
The Maruoka Castle Research and Research Committee led by (Junichi Yoshida from the Fukui University of Technology) was commissioned by the Board of Education of Sakai City to survey the castle. By dating the timber used in the construction of the tenshu from dendrochronology, radiocarbon concentration, and oxygen isotope ratio, they reported after four years of investigations in March 2019 that most of the through pillars, which play a structurally important role, were cut down after 1626. Confusing matters was the observation that the architectural style of Maruoka's tenshu was considered outdated by the 1620s. This would indicate that if it had been built in 1576 by Shibata Katsutoyo as generally assumed, it would have been heavily reconstructed in the latter half of the 1620s (mostly likely in 1628) by the Honda clan following Honda Narishige being assigned ownership of the castle in 1613.

In October 2019 the northeast exterior wall of the tenshu was damaged by a typhoon and were subsequently repaired by the Tanaka Shrine Co.

== Current status ==
Maruoka Castle is one of just twelve castles in Japan which has managed to keep its original tenshu.

The former castle grounds are now incorporated in the Kasumigajo Park, which contain some remnants of the ramparts and moats as well as a small museum that displays some arms, armour, and household items related to its former lords. The area is famed for its approximately 400 cherry blossom trees. An annual cherry blossom festival is held during the first three weeks of April during which the trees are lit up in the evenings by over 300 paper lanterns.

== Description ==
Sitting atop a 6.2-metre (20 ft 4 in) high stone platform set among Japanese black pine and cherry trees, access to the tenshu is via a long staircase leading directly into its black wooden interior. The tenshu has three floors, with uppermost serving as a watchtower. The tenshu has a number of unique design features. While the roof originally had wood shingles at some stage these were replaced with roof tiles made from a local stone called shakudani. These stone tiles mean the roof is unusually heavy with a weight of 60 tons which is more than double the weight of a normal tile-roofed or wooden shingle roof. In Japanese. Other sources quote a weight of 120 tons. The reason for using stone tiles believed to have been because they provided superior thermal insulation during the winter. The roof also features stone shachihako (fish/tiger) ornaments.

The right-hand side of the tenshu has a series of protruding ishiotoshimado (stone-dropping windows) that allowed defenders to shoot at enemies via timber slats and also via a trap door to drop stones or pour oil or boiling water on attackers underneath. The tenshu also has a hidden floor not apparent from the exterior, but in general both the size of the tenshu and its interior are very similar to that of contemporary Inuyama Castle.
