= Sakai, Fukui (town) =

Dissolved municipality in Fukui prefecture, Japan

Sakai (坂井町, Sakai-chō) was a town located in Sakai District, Fukui Prefecture, Japan.

== Population ==
The town of Sakai had a population of 12,953 at the 2005 national census, an increase of 181 (1.4%) from the 2000 census. The total area was 31.70 km^{2} and population density was 408.61 persons per km^{2}.

== History ==
On March 20, 2006, the town merged with the other towns within Sakai District, namely Harue, Maruoka and Mikuni, to create the city of Sakai (坂井市, Sakai-shi). The name Sakai-chō is still used within the postal address of locations within the former town.
