= FKJ =

FKJ may refer to:

- FK Jablonec, a Czech football club
- FK Jagodina, a Serbian football club
- Fukui Airport, in Japan
- French Kiwi Juice, a French musician
