= Maruoka Domain =

Japanese historical estate

Maruoka Domain 丸岡藩
- under Tokugawa shogunate Japan
- 1613–1871
- Capital: Maruoka Castle
- Area
  - Coordinates: 36°09′8.72″N 136°16′19.72″E
- Government
  - Type: Daimyō
- Historical era: Edo period
  - Split from Fukui Domain: 1613
  - Honda: 1613
  - Arima: 1695
  - Disestablished: 1871
- Today part of: part of Fukui Prefecture

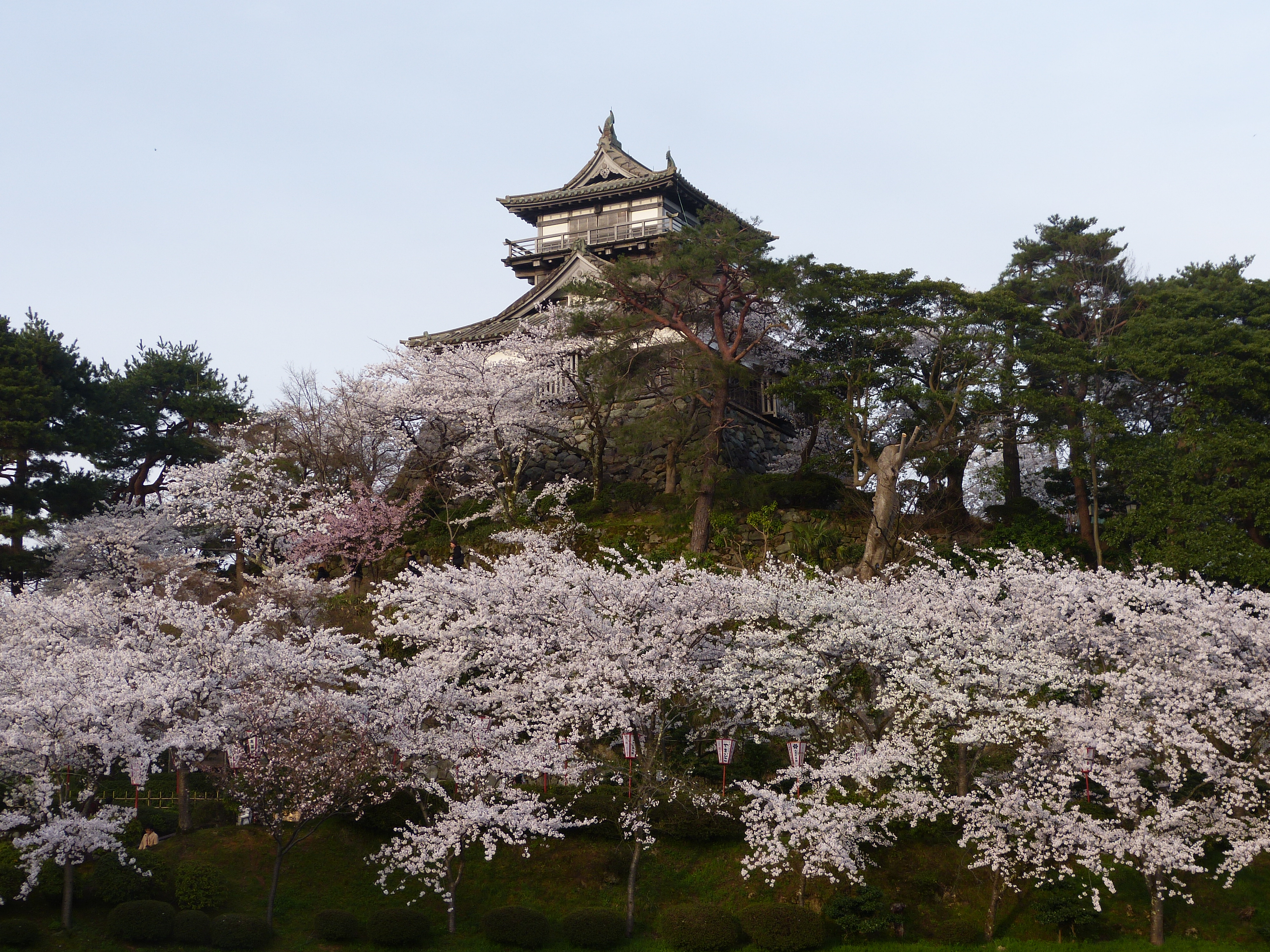
Maruoka Castle

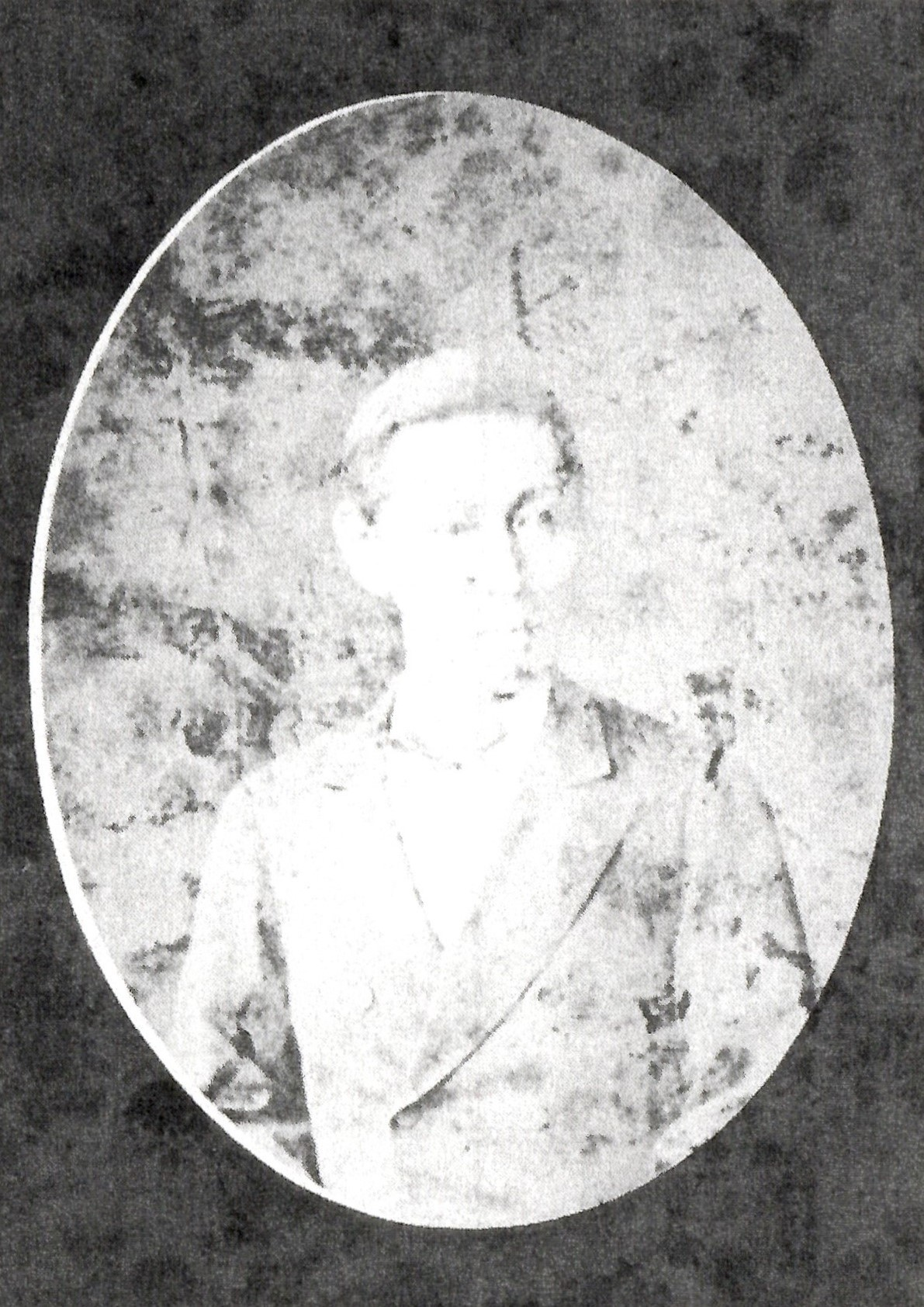
Arima Michizumi, final daimyō of Maruoka

Maruoka Domain (丸岡藩, Maruoka-han) was a feudal domain under the Tokugawa shogunate of Edo period Japan. It was based at Maruoka Castle in eastern Echizen Province in what is now the Maruoka neighbourhood of modern-day Sakai, Fukui. It was ruled during its history by the Honda clan, and subsequently by the Arima clan.

== History ==
In the Sengoku period, the area around Maruoka was controlled by Shibata Katsutoyo, the adopted son of Shibata Katsuie, one of Oda Nobunaga's leading generals. After Shibata Katsutoyo died of illness during the Battle of Shizugatake in 1583, the area was given to the Aoyama clan. However, the Aoyama sided with the Western Army under Ishida Mitsunari during the Battle of Sekigahara and were thus dispossessed by the victorious Tokugawa Ieyasu. Ieyasu awarded Echizen Province to his son, Yūki Hideyasu, who in turn created a 26,000 koku subsidiary holding centered at Maruoka for his retainer, Imamura Moritsugu. In 1612, due to an O-Ie Sōdō within Fukui Domain, the Tokugawa shogunate raised Maruoka to 40,000 koku and reassigned it to Honda Narishige, the son of Honda Shigetsugu, one of Ieyasu's leading generals. This marked the start of Maruoka Domain. Due to Honda Narishige's efforts at the Siege of Osaka in 1624, its kokudaka was raised to 46,300 koku and he was made completely independent of Fukui Domain. His son and grandson completed Maruoka Castle and the surrounding jōkamachi. However, his great-grandson, Honda Shigemasu was an alcoholic and incompetent, and was dispossessed by the shōgunate in 1695.

The Honda were replaced by Arima Kiyozumi, a descendant of the Kirishitan daimyō Arima Harunobu, who was transferred from Itoigawa Domain. His son, Arima Kazunori managed to get the clan's status changed from that of tozama daimyō to fudai daimyō in 1711. The 5th Arima daimyō, Arima Shigezumi served as a wakadoshiyori and the 8th (and final) Arima daimyō, Arima Michizumi rose to the post of rōjū. The Arima clan continued to rule Maruoka until the abolition of the han system in July 1871.

== Holdings at the end of the Edo period ==
Like most domains in the han system, Maruoka consisted of several discontinuous territories calculated to provide the assigned kokudaka, based on periodic cadastral surveys and projected agricultural yields,

- Echizen Province
  - 91 villages in Sakai District
  - 2 villages in Nanjō District

== List of daimyō ==
| # | Name | Tenure | Courtesy title | Court Rank | kokudaka |
|---|---|---|---|---|---|
Honda clan (fudai) 1613–1695
| 1 | Honda Narishige (本多成重) | 1613–1646 | Hida-no-kami ( 飛騨守) | Junior 5th Rank, Lower Grade (従五位下) | 40,000 -> 46,300 koku |
| 2 | Honda Shigeyoshi (本多重能) | 1646–1651 | Awa-no-kami (淡路守) | Junior 5th Rank, Lower Grade (従五位下) | 46,300 koku |
| 3 | Honda Shigeaki (本多重昭) | 1652–1676 | Hida-no-kami ( 飛騨守) | Junior 5th Rank, Lower Grade (従五位下) | 46,300 koku |
| 4 | Honda Shigemasu (本多重益) | 1676–1695 | Hida-no-kami ( 飛騨守) | Junior 5th Rank, Lower Grade (従五位下) | 46,300 koku |
Arima clan (tozama ->fudai) 1695–1871
| 1 | Arima Kiyozumi (有馬清純) | 1695–1702 | Suo-no-kami (周防守) | Junior 5th Rank, Lower Grade (従五位下) | 50,000 koku |
| 2 | Arima Kiyonori (有馬一準 | 1703–1733 | Saemon-no-suke (左衛門佐) | Junior 5th Rank, Lower Grade (従五位下) | 50,000 koku |
| 3 | Arima Takazumi (有馬孝純) | 1733–1757 | Hyūga-no-kami (日向守) | Junior 5th Rank, Lower Grade (従五位下) | 50,000 koku |
| 4 | Arima Masazumi (有馬允純) | 1757–1772 | Saemon-no-suke (左衛門佐) | Junior 5th Rank, Lower Grade (従五位下) | 50,000 koku |
| 5 | Arima Shigezumi (有馬誉純) | 1772–1830 | Saemon-no-suke (左衛門佐) | Junior 5th Rank, Lower Grade (従五位下) | 50,000 koku |
| 6 | Arima Norizumi (有馬徳純) | 1830–1837 | Saemon-no-suke (左衛門佐) | Junior 5th Rank, Lower Grade (従五位下) | 50,000 koku |
| 7 | Arima Haruzumi (有馬温純) | 1838–1855 | Hyūga-no-kami (日向守) | Junior 5th Rank, Lower Grade (従五位下) | 50,000 koku |
| 8 | Arima Michizumi (有馬道純) | 1855–1871 | Saemon-no-suke (左衛門佐) | Junior 5th Rank, Lower Grade (従五位下) | 50,000 koku |

=== Arima Kiyozumi ===
Arima Kiyozumi (有馬清純; February 14, 1644 – January 26, 1703) was an Edo period daimyō. He was the eldest son of Arima Yasuzumi, the 2nd daimyō of Nobeoka Domain. His wife was a daughter of Okabe Yukitaka of Kishiwada Domain. In 1679, on the retirement of his father, he became daimyō of Nobeoka. In 1690, his domain suffered from a large-scale peasant uprising which he had difficulty in suppressing, and in 1692 he was demoted to Itoigawa Domain in Echigo Province, which had an equal kokudaka of 50,000 koku but was not classed as a “castle-holding” domain. In 1695 he was transferred to Maruoka, again with the same 50,000 kokudaka, which restored his status as castellan. He died in 1702.

=== Arima Kazunori ===
Arima Kazunori (有馬一準; January 13, 1698 – October 2, 1757) was the 2nd daimyō of Maruoka Domain. He was born in Maruoka Castle as the eldest son of Arima Kiyozumi and became daimyō in 1703 on the death of his father. His childhood name was Daikichi (大吉), and his name as daimyō was initially Arima Masazumi (真純), which he later changed to Sumihisa (純寿) and then to Hisazumi (寿純). He only took the name of Kazunori after this retirement. His courtesy title was Saemon-no-suke, and his court rank was Junior Fifth Rank, Lower Grade. His wife was the adopted daughter of Akimoto Takatomo of Kawagoe Domain. In 1711, he managed to change the status of the Arima clan from that of tozama to fudai daimyō. However, during his tenure the domain suffered greatly from crop failures in 1706, 1721 and 1723, which led to a large-scale peasant's revolt in 1724. His efforts to reform the domain's finances through issue of silver certificates and increasing loans had only mixed results. In 1733, he retired in favour of his son. He died in 1757.

=== Arima Takazumi ===
Arima Takazumi (有馬孝純; January 18, 1718 – March 27, 1757) was the 3rd daimyō of Maruoka Domain. He was born in Maruoka Castle as the eldest son of Arima Kazunori and became daimyō in 1733 on the retirement of his father. His courtesy title was Hyūga-no-kami, and his court rank was Junior Fifth Rank, Lower Grade. His wife was the adopted daughter of Inaba Masatomo of Yodo Domain. He continued his father's economic recovery policies, which were greatly assisted by the opening of a copper mine in his domain in 1735. He died a few months before his father at Maruoka Castle.

=== Arima Masazumi ===
Arima Masazumi (有馬允純; April 24, 1747 – September 28, 1772) was the 4th daimyō of Maruoka Domain. He was born at the clan's Edo residence as the eighth son of Arima Takazumi, and was made heir as all of his elder brothers had been born to concubines. He became daimyō in 1757 on the death of his father. His courtesy title was Saemon-no-suke, and his court rank was Junior Fifth Rank, Lower Grade. His wife was the granddaughter of Matsudara Sadasato of Imabari Domain. He attempted to implement land reforms in his domain, but died in 1772 at the age of 26.

=== Arima Shigezumi ===
Arima Shigezumi (有馬誉純; May 22, 1769 – December 5, 1836) was the 5th daimyō of Maruoka Domain. He was eldest son of Arima Masazumi, and became daimyō in 1772 on the death of his father. His courtesy title was Saemon-no-suke, and his court rank was Junior Fifth Rank, Lower Grade. His wife was the daughter of Inaba Masahiro of Yodo Domain. He was received in formal audience by Shōgun Tokugawa Ieharu in 1782. In 1778, he domain suffered from a widespread peasant's revolt, to which he responded by implementing land reform and tax reform measures begun by his father. In 1791 he was appointed a sōshaban and 1810 he was appointed jisha-bugyō. He rose to the post of wakadoshiyori in 1812. He established a han school within the domain in 1804. He resigned as wakadoshiyori in 1819, citing ill health, but continued as daimyō until 1830. he died in 1836.

=== Arima Norizumi ===
Arima Norizumi (有馬誉純; June 8, 1804 – October 21, 1837) was the 6th daimyō of Maruoka Domain. He was fourth son of Yanagihara Masaatsu of Takada Domain, and was adopted as heir to Arima Shigezumi in 1820 and was received in formal audience by Shogun Tokugawa Ienari the same year. He became daimyō in 1830 on the retirement of his stepfather. His courtesy title was Saemon-no-suke, and his court rank was Junior Fifth Rank, Lower Grade. His wife was the fourth daughter of Arima Shigezumi. He died in 1837.

=== Arima Harusumi ===
Arima Harusumi (有馬温純; 1829 – June 9, 1855) was the 7th daimyō of Maruoka Domain. He was a grandson of Arima Shigezumi, and was adopted as heir to Arima Norizumi in 1836, becoming daimyō a year later on Norizumi's death. He was received in formal audience by Shōgun Tokugawa Ieyoshi in 1841. His courtesy title was Hyūga-no-kami, and his court rank was Junior Fifth Rank, Lower Grade. His wife was the daughter of Arima Norizumi. He was ordered by the Tokugawa shogunate to construct the Maruyama Domain Battery against possible incursions by foreign vessels in 1852. In died in 1855 at the age of 27.

=== Arima Michizumi ===
Arima Michizumi (有馬道純; October 8, 1837 – May 24, 1903) was the 8th (and final) daimyō of Maruoka Domain. He was the third son of Honda Tadachika of Yamasaki Domain. His grandfather, Honda Tadayoshi was the younger son of Arima Takazumi and had been adopted in the Honda clan. As Arima Harusumi only had daughters, he was adopted as heir and became daimyō in 1855. In 1862 he was appointed jisha-bugyō and became a wakadoshiyori in 1863 and rose to the office of rōjū the same year. In 1868, he pledged fealty to the new Meiji government and served as Imperial Governor of Maruyama until the abolition of the han system in 1871. He became a viscount (shishaku) in the kazoku peerage system. He died in 1903 and his grave is at Yanaka Cemetery.
