= Dmitry Nalivkin =

Soviet geologist known for mapping the geology of the USSR

- Born: Dmitry Vasilyevich Nalivkin; August 25, 1889; Saint Petersburg, Russian Empire
- Died: March 3, 1982 (aged 92); Leningrad, RSFSR, Soviet Union
- Scientific career
- Fields: Geologist
- Workplaces: Geological Commission of Russia

Dmitry Vasilyevich Nalivkin (Russian: Дмитрий Васильевич Наливкин; 25 August 1889 – 3 March 1982) was a Soviet geologist. He was primarily interested in stratigraphy, but was also responsible in large part for mapping the geology of the Soviet Union.

== Biography ==
The son of Vasily Alexievich Nalivkin and Olga Venediktova, Dmitry Nalivkin was born in Saint Petersburg, Russian Empire on 25 August 1889. His father was a mining engineer, who died young during a field expedition while attempting to rescue a drowning friend. He followed in his father's footsteps by entering the local Mining Academy in 1907. During his training he began teaching there, and also became involved in fieldwork expeditions in the Caucasus and Central Asia. Early work dealt with Devonian brachiopods in the Kyrgyzstan portion of the Fergana Valley, and he retained an interest in this geological period throughout his career.

== Career ==
He received the A. P. Karpinsky Distinguished Award in 1913 for one of his papers on faunal composition, and this provided him with the means to go to the Russian Biological Station in Villefranche (France) to study mollusks. By 1915 Nalivkin was considered an expert in central Asian geology. He was asked by the Russian Geographical Society to lead an expedition to study ancient glaciations in the Pamir. Their results of their study confirmed traces of two ancient glaciations, as well as producing a stratigraphic succession and the completion of a tectonic map. Nalivkin was awarded the Small Silver Medal of the Geographical Society in recognition of his leadership of the expedition. He was called to military service in 1917, and following demobilisation in late 1917, returned to his studies of Devonian fauna.

In 1917 he was elected to the Geological Commission of Russia, and remained with it for more sixty years. During his tenure with the Commission he was responsible for directing research into paleontology, sedimentology and stratigraphy, work which led to the development and extraction of resources such as coal, ores and petroleum.

He completed his doctorate in 1924 and was appointed a professor at the Saint Petersburg Mining University. During World War II, his research extended to a search for bauxite as a means of assisting the war effort's need for aircraft metals. After the war, he was in Ashgabat, Turkmenistan when it experienced a catastrophic 1948 earthquake.

His most significant contribution came with the creation of the index geological maps of the USSR (and adjacent regions), which attracted considerable international attention. With the completion of his Geological Map of the USSR (1:2,500,000 scale) he was awarded the prestigious Lenin Prize in 1957.

== Memberships and awards ==
- Director of the Institute of Geological Mapping
- Vice-director of the Geological Institute of the Academy of Science
- Chairman of the Technical Council under the USSR Ministry of Geology
- Director of the Limnology Laboratory
- Chairman of the Commission on International Tectonic Mapping
- President of the Presidium of the Turkmenian Branch of the USSR Academy of Sciences
- Member of the Science Board of the Russian Museum.
- Leader, Soviet Delegation at Session XXII of the International Geological Congress, as well as delegations at other international conferences and meetings.
- N. M. Przhevalsky Small Silver Medal of the Russian Geographical Society
- Karpinsky Gold Medal of the USSR Academy of Sciences
- František Pošepný Gold Medal of the Czechoslovak Academy of Sciences
- P. Fourmarier Medal of the Belgium Academy of Sciences
- L. von Buch Medal of the German Geological Society
- Silver Medal of the Peace Council
- Honorary Fellow of the German Geographical Society
- Fellow, Turkmen Academy of Sciences
- Fellow, CSSR Academy of Sciences
- Fellow, Serbia Academy of Sciences and Fine Arts
- Fellow, the Paleontological Society of India
- Fellow of the Geological Society of America
- Fellow, Geological Societies of London, France, West Germany, Hungary, and Poland

== Personal life ==
Nalivkin married fellow geologist A.K. Zvorykina. He died in Saint Petersburg in 1982.
