= List of earthquakes in 1948 =

Earthquakes in 1948
Approximate epicenters of the earthquakes in 1948
- 4.0–5.9 magnitude
- 6.0–6.9 magnitude
- 7.0–7.9 magnitude
- 8.0+ magnitude
- Strongest: Philippines, Panay (Magnitude 7.8) 24 January
- Deadliest: Soviet Union, north of Ashgabat, Turkmenistan (Magnitude 7.3) 5 October, 110,000 deaths
- Total fatalities: 116,135

Number by magnitude
- 9.0+: 0
- 8.0–8.9: 0
- 7.0–7.9: 18
- 6.0–6.9: 32
- 5.0–5.9: 1

This is a list of earthquakes in 1948. Only magnitude 6.0 or greater earthquakes appear on the list. Lower magnitude events are included if they have caused death, injury or damage. Events which occurred in remote areas will be excluded from the list as they wouldn't have generated significant media interest. All dates are listed according to UTC time. This would go down as one of the deadliest years of the 20th century. The main factor behind this was the earthquake which struck Turkmenistan that left 110,000 people dead in early October. This was the deadliest single earthquake since 1923 when a great quake struck Tokyo. Other events during the year caused many deaths including one in Japan in June which resulted in over 5,000 deaths. The number of magnitude 7.0+ events (18) was around normal with the biggest event being in the Philippines measuring 7.8. Clusters of large events were reported in Latin America and the southwest Pacific particularly Fiji in the early part of the year.

== Overall ==
=== By death toll ===
Rank	Death toll	Magnitude	Location	MMI	Depth (km)	Date
1	110,000	7.3	Turkmenistan, north of Ashgabat	X (Extreme)	15.0	5 October
2	5,131	6.8	Japan, Fukui Prefecture, Honshu	VII (Very strong)	10.0	28 June
3	800	7.1	China, Sichuan Province	X (Extreme)	55.0	25 May
4	110	6.8	China, Yunnan	VIII (Severe)	0.0	27 June
5	74	7.8	Philippines, Panay	IX (Violent)	15.0	24 January

- Note: At least 10 casualties

=== By magnitude ===
Rank	Magnitude	Death toll	Location	MMI	Depth (km)	Date
1	7.8	74	Philippines, Panay	IX (Violent)	15.0	24 January
2	7.5	0	Tonga	V (Moderate)	15.0	8 September
3	7.3	0	Greece, Karpathos	X (Extreme)	15.0	9 February
3	7.3	110,000	Turkmen Soviet Socialist Republic, north of Ashgabat	X (Extreme)	15.0	5 October
4	7.2	0	Indonesia, Gulf of Tomini	( )	170.0	9 February
4	7.2	0	Japan, off the south coast of Honshu	VII (Very strong)	15.0	17 April
5	7.1	0	Fiji	( )	595.0	27 January
5	7.1	0	Indonesia, northeast of Buru	VII (Very strong)	15.0	1 March
5	7.1	0	United States, south of Alaska Peninsula	VI (Strong)	25.0	14 May
5	7.1	800	China, Sichuan Province	X (Extreme)	55.0	25 May
6	7.0	0	Fiji	( )	581.6	4 January
6	7.0	0	Fiji	( )	143.6	22 January
6	7.0	0	Philippines, northwest of Luzon	( )	15.0	3 March
6	7.0	4	Peru, Lima Region	( )	51.2	28 May
6	7.0	0	Argentina, Salta Province	VII (Very strong)	30.0	25 August
6	7.0	0	Philippines, Dinagat Island	( )	100.0	2 September
6	7.0	0	Costa Rica, San Jose Province	( )	38.5	19 November
6	7.0	0	Chile, Antofagasta Region	VII (Very strong)	100.0	26 December

- Note: At least 7.0 magnitude

== Notable events ==
=== January ===
January
- Strongest: 7.8 M_{w} Philippines
- Deadliest: 7.8 M_{w} Philippines; 74 deaths
- Total fatalities: 74

Number by magnitude
- 8.0–8.9: 0
- 7.0–7.9: 4
- 6.0–6.9: 2

Date	Country and location	M_{w}	Depth (km)	MMI	Notes	Casualties	
Date	Country and location	M_{w}	Depth (km)	MMI	Notes	Dead	Injured
4	Fiji	7.0	581.6				
6	Mexico, Guerrero	6.4	30.0	VI			
22	Fiji	7.0	143.6				
24	Philippines, Panay	7.8	15.0	IX	The 1948 Lady Caycay earthquake caused a total of 74 deaths. 2 people were killed in a tsunami that swept ashore. Many homes were destroyed or damaged. Costs were around $3.5 million (1948 rate).	74	
27	Fiji	7.1	595.0				
28	Indonesia, Molucca Sea	6.5	15.0				

=== February ===
February
- Strongest: 7.3 M_{w} Greece
- Total fatalities: 0

Number by magnitude
- 8.0–8.9: 0
- 7.0–7.9: 2
- 6.0–6.9: 1

Date	Country and location	M_{w}	Depth (km)	MMI	Notes	Casualties	
Date	Country and location	M_{w}	Depth (km)	MMI	Notes	Dead	Injured
9	Greece, Karpathos	7.3	15.0	X	Some damage was caused by a tsunami affecting the area.		
9	Indonesia, Gulf of Tomini	7.2	170.0				
13	Republic of China, southern Xinjiang Province	6.3	15.0	VII			

=== March ===
March
- Strongest: 7.1 M_{w} Indonesia
- Total fatalities: 0

Number by magnitude
- 8.0–8.9: 0
- 7.0–7.9: 2
- 6.0–6.9: 1

Date	Country and location	M_{w}	Depth (km)	MMI	Notes	Casualties	
Date	Country and location	M_{w}	Depth (km)	MMI	Notes	Dead	Injured
1	Indonesia, northeast of Buru	7.1	15.0	VII			
3	Philippines, northwest of Luzon	7.0	15.0				
13	Indonesia, Molucca Sea	6.5	15.0				

=== April ===
April
- Strongest: 7.2 M_{w} Japan
- Deadliest: 6.5 M_{w} Greece; 2 deaths
- Total fatalities: 2

Number by magnitude
- 8.0–8.9: 0
- 7.0–7.9: 1
- 6.0–6.9: 2

Date	Country and location	M_{w}	Depth (km)	MMI	Notes	Casualties	
Date	Country and location	M_{w}	Depth (km)	MMI	Notes	Dead	Injured
17	Japan, off the south coast of Honshu	7.2	15.0	VII			
21	Dominican Republic, Samana Province	6.9	15.0	VII			
22	Greece, Ionian Islands (region)	6.5	15.0	X	2 people were killed and 45 injuries were caused. 244 homes were destroyed and a further 2,022 were damaged.	2	45

=== May ===
May
- Strongest: 7.1 M_{w} 2 events
- Deadliest: 7.1 M_{w} Republic of China; 800 deaths
- Total fatalities: 805

Number by magnitude
- 8.0–8.9: 0
- 7.0–7.9: 3
- 6.0–6.9: 5

Date	Country and location	M_{w}	Depth (km)	MMI	Notes	Casualties	
Date	Country and location	M_{w}	Depth (km)	MMI	Notes	Dead	Injured
9	Japan, southeast of Kyushu	6.7	25.0	VI			
11	Peru, Tacna Region	6.6	58.7	X	1 person was killed and some damage was caused.	1	
12	Japan, off the east coast of Honshu	6.8	20.0				
14	United States, south of the Alaska Peninsula	7.1	25.0	VI			
22	New Zealand, Canterbury, New Zealand	6.5	15.0	VII			
25	Republic of China, Sichuan	7.1	55.0	X	800 people were killed and another 200 were injured in the 1948 Litang earthquake. 600 homes were destroyed.	800	200
26	United States, south of Kodiak Island, Alaska	6.0	0.0		Depth unknown.		
28	Peru, off the central coast	7.0	51.2	VII	4 people were killed and some damage was caused.	4	

=== June ===
June
- Strongest: 6.8 M_{w} 2 events
- Deadliest: 6.8 M_{w} Japan; 5,131 deaths
- Total fatalities: 5,247

Number by magnitude
- 8.0–8.9: 0
- 7.0–7.9: 0
- 6.0–6.9: 7

Date	Country and location	M_{w}	Depth (km)	MMI	Notes	Casualties	
Date	Country and location	M_{w}	Depth (km)	MMI	Notes	Dead	Injured
2	Indonesia, off the north coast of Sumatra	6.2	0.0		A tsunami was generated. Unknown depth.		
15	Japan, Wakayama Prefecture, Honshu	6.7	24.4	VII			
27	Republic of China, Yunnan	6.8	0.0	VIII	110 people were killed and a further 800 were injured. 600 homes were destroyed. Unknown depth.	110	800
28	Japan, Fukui Prefecture, Honshu	6.8	10.0	VII	The 1948 Fukui earthquake caused major destruction in the area. 5,131 people were killed and 11,000 were injured. About 63,000 homes were destroyed and another 18,543 were damaged. $1 billion (1948 rate) in property damage was caused.	5,131	11,000
29	New Zealand, Western Samoa	6.5	35.0				
29	Soviet Union, Dagestan Republic, Russia	6.0	35.0				
30	Greece, Epirus (region)	6.4	15.0	XI	6 people were killed and some damage was caused.	6	

=== July ===
July
- Strongest: 6.5 M_{w} Peru
- Total fatalities: 0

Number by magnitude
- 8.0–8.9: 0
- 7.0–7.9: 0
- 6.0–6.9: 2

Date	Country and location	M_{w}	Depth (km)	MMI	Notes	Casualties	
Date	Country and location	M_{w}	Depth (km)	MMI	Notes	Dead	Injured
7	Japan, off the south coast of Honshu	6.4	15.0	V			
20	Peru, off the southern coast	6.5	30.0	VI			

=== August ===
August
- Strongest: 7.0 M_{w} Argentina
- Total fatalities: 0

Number by magnitude
- 8.0–8.9: 0
- 7.0–7.9: 1
- 6.0–6.9: 2

Date	Country and location	M_{w}	Depth (km)	MMI	Notes	Casualties	
Date	Country and location	M_{w}	Depth (km)	MMI	Notes	Dead	Injured
11	Mexico, Veracruz	6.8	105.3				
19	United States, central Alaska	6.3	100.0	V			
25	Argentina, Salta Province	7.0	30.0	VII	1948 Salta earthquake.		

=== September ===
September
- Strongest: 7.5 M_{w} Tonga
- Total fatalities: 0

Number by magnitude
- 8.0–8.9: 0
- 7.0–7.9: 2
- 6.0–6.9: 1

Date	Country and location	M_{w}	Depth (km)	MMI	Notes	Casualties	
Date	Country and location	M_{w}	Depth (km)	MMI	Notes	Dead	Injured
2	Philippines, Dinagat Island	7.0	100.0				
8	Tonga	7.5	15.0	V			
10	Soviet Union, Kuril Islands, Russia	6.8	25.0	VI			

=== October ===
October
- Strongest: 7.3 M_{w} Turkmen Soviet Socialist Republic
- Deadliest: 7.3 M_{w} Turkmen Soviet Socialist Republic; 110,000 deaths
- Total fatalities: 110,003

Number by magnitude
- 8.0–8.9: 0
- 7.0–7.9: 1
- 6.0–6.9: 2
- 5.0–5.9: 1

Date	Country and location	M_{w}	Depth (km)	MMI	Notes	Casualties	
Date	Country and location	M_{w}	Depth (km)	MMI	Notes	Dead	Injured
4	Taiwan, off the east coast	6.3	15.0	V			
5	Turkmen Soviet Socialist Republic, north of Ashgabat	7.3	15.0	X	The 1948 Ashgabat earthquake was one of the worst of the 20th century. 110,000 people were killed. Many (at least 1,001) were injured. Ashgabat was almost destroyed. Some parts of northern Iran suffered heavy damage. Damage costs were $25 million (1948 rate).	110,000	1,001
8	Republic of China, Guizhou	5.8	0.0	VIII	3 people were killed and 75 were injured. Many homes were damaged or destroyed. Unknown depth.	3	75
28	Japan, off the east coast of Honshu	6.5	65.0				

=== November ===
November
- Strongest: 7.0 M_{w} Costa Rica
- Total fatalities: 0

Number by magnitude
- 8.0–8.9: 0
- 7.0–7.9: 1
- 6.0–6.9: 2

Date	Country and location	M_{w}	Depth (km)	MMI	Notes	Casualties	
Date	Country and location	M_{w}	Depth (km)	MMI	Notes	Dead	Injured
19	Costa Rica, San Jose Province	7.0	38.5				
21	New Hebrides	6.8	174.5				
26	Australia, Madang Province, Papua New Guinea	6.6	54.9	VI			

=== December ===
December
- Strongest: 7.0 M_{w} Chile
- Deadliest: 6.7 M_{w} Mexico; 4 deaths
- Total fatalities: 4

Number by magnitude
- 8.0–8.9: 0
- 7.0–7.9: 1
- 6.0–6.9: 6

Date	Country and location	M_{w}	Depth (km)	MMI	Notes	Casualties	
Date	Country and location	M_{w}	Depth (km)	MMI	Notes	Dead	Injured
4	Mexico, southwest of Islas Marias	6.7	15.0	V	4 people were killed and 21 were injured. Major damage was caused.	4	21
4	United States, southern California	6.0	6.0	VII			
12	United States, Rat Islands, Alaska	6.6	0.0		Unknown depth.		
15	Japan, Volcano Islands	6.8	246.6				
23	Soviet Union, Commander Islands, Russia	6.5	20.0				
26	Chile, Antofagasta Region	7.0	100.0	VII			
29	United States, northern California	6.0	0.0	VII	Unknown depth.		
