= Fukui Airport =

Fukui Airport 福井空港
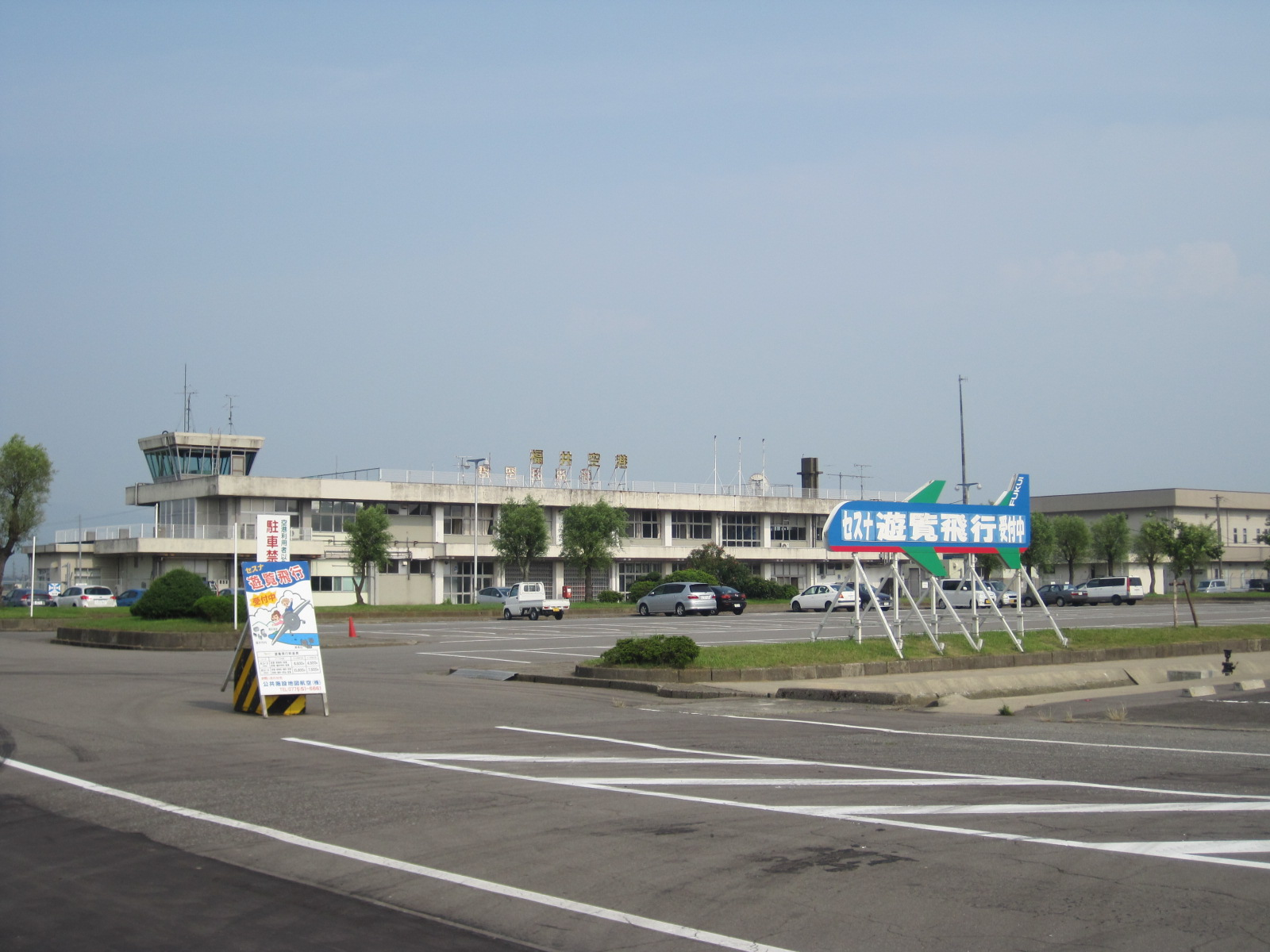
- IATA: FKJ; ICAO: RJNF

Summary
- Airport type: Public
- Operator: Fukui Prefecture
- Location: Sakai, Fukui, Japan
- Elevation AMSL: 18 ft (5.5 m)
- Coordinates: 36°08′34″N 136°13′26″E

Map
- Location in Japan RJNF (Japan)

Runways
Direction	Length		Surface
Direction	m	ft	Surface
18/36	1,200	3,937	Concrete

Statistics (2015)
- Passengers: 0
- Cargo (metric tonnes): 0
- Aircraft movement: 6,104
- Source: Japanese AIP at AIS Japan; Japanese Ministry of Land, Infrastructure, Transport and Tourism

Fukui Airport (福井空港, Fukui Kūkō) (IATA: FKJ, ICAO: RJNF) is a public aerodrome located 5.0 NM (9.3 km; 5.8 mi) north of Fukui Station in the city of Sakai, Fukui Prefecture, Japan. It is also referred to as Harue Airport (春江空港, Harue Kūkō) from its location in the former town of Harue.

== History ==
Work began on Fukui Airport in 1964, and the airport was opened in 1966, with All Nippon Airways (ANA) proving regularly scheduled services using a Fokker F-27 to Haneda Airport in Tokyo, with flights once or twice a day. The NAMC YS-11 replaced the F-27 on this route from April 1, 1972. However, the airport suffered from competition by nearby Komatsu Airport, whose longer runway could accommodate jet aircraft. Services between Fukui and Nagoya commenced from December 1, 1974 but all scheduled commercial flights were discontinued due to lack of passengers from March 1976. In 1985, the Fukui Prefectural government announced a plan to lengthen the runway at Fukui Airport to 2,000 metres (6,600 ft), and despite strong local opposition, a budget for the expansion was secured in the nation's 1986 Fifth Airport Improvement Budget. Local opposition remained strong, and improved bus and train connections to Komatsu Airport resulted in less and less passengers to Fukui Airport. In 2001, the runway expansion project was shelved, and in June 2003 was cancelled in favour of pushing for completion of the Hokuriku Shinkansen high speed train. From October 2006, flight operations at Fukui Airport were transferred to the jurisdiction of the Chubu Centrair International Airport in Nagoya.

== Current situation ==
Fukui Airport is currently used primarily for general aviation, and the aviation department of many universities conduct training operations here. Also, the airport is a center for glider sports, with a glider competition held annually. The Fukui Prefectural Police operates a Eurocopter EC135 and the Fukui Prefectural Fire Department operates a MBB/Kawasaki BK 117 from Fukui Airport.
