= Hitobashira =

Human sacrifice via premature burial

Hitobashira (Japanese: 人柱; "human pillar"), also known in Chinese as da sheng zhuang (simplified Chinese: 打生桩; traditional Chinese: 打生樁; pinyin: dǎshēngzhuāng; Jyutping: daa2saang1zong1), is a cultural practice of human sacrifice of premature burial before the construction of buildings. Hitobashira was practiced formerly in Japan as a form of human sacrifice. A person was buried alive under or near large-scale buildings like dams, bridges and castles, as a prayer to kami (indigenous divinities). It was believed that these builders' rites would protect the building from destruction by natural disasters, such as floods, or by enemy attacks. Hitobashira can also refer to the workers who were buried alive under inhumane conditions.

== Hitobashira ==
Some of the earliest written records of hitobashira can be found in the Nihon Shoki (The Chronicles of Japan). One story centered on Emperor Nintoku (323 A.D.) discusses the overflowing of the Kitakawa and Mamuta Rivers. Protection against the torrent was beyond the ability of the stricken populace. The Emperor had a divine revelation in his dream to the effect that there was a person named Kowakubi in the province of Musashi and a person called Koromono-ko in the province of Kawachi. If they should be sacrificed to deities of the two rivers respectively, then the construction of embankments would be easily achieved. Kowakubi was subsequently thrown into the torrent of the Kitakawa river, with a prayer offered. After the sacrifice the embankment was constructed, Koromono-ko however escaped being sacrificed.

The Yasutomi-ki, a diary from the 15th century, documents the famous tradition of "Nagara-no Hitobashira". According to the tradition, a woman who was carrying a boy on her back was caught while she was passing along the river Nagara and was buried at the place where a large bridge was then to be built. Hitobashira traditions were almost always practiced in conjunction with the building of complex, dangerous, often water-related projects, such as bridges. The stories of hitobashira were believed to inspire a spirit of self-sacrifice in people.

Stories of hitobashira and other human sacrifices were common in Japan as late as the sixteenth century.

=== Architectural examples ===
==== Maruoka Castle ====
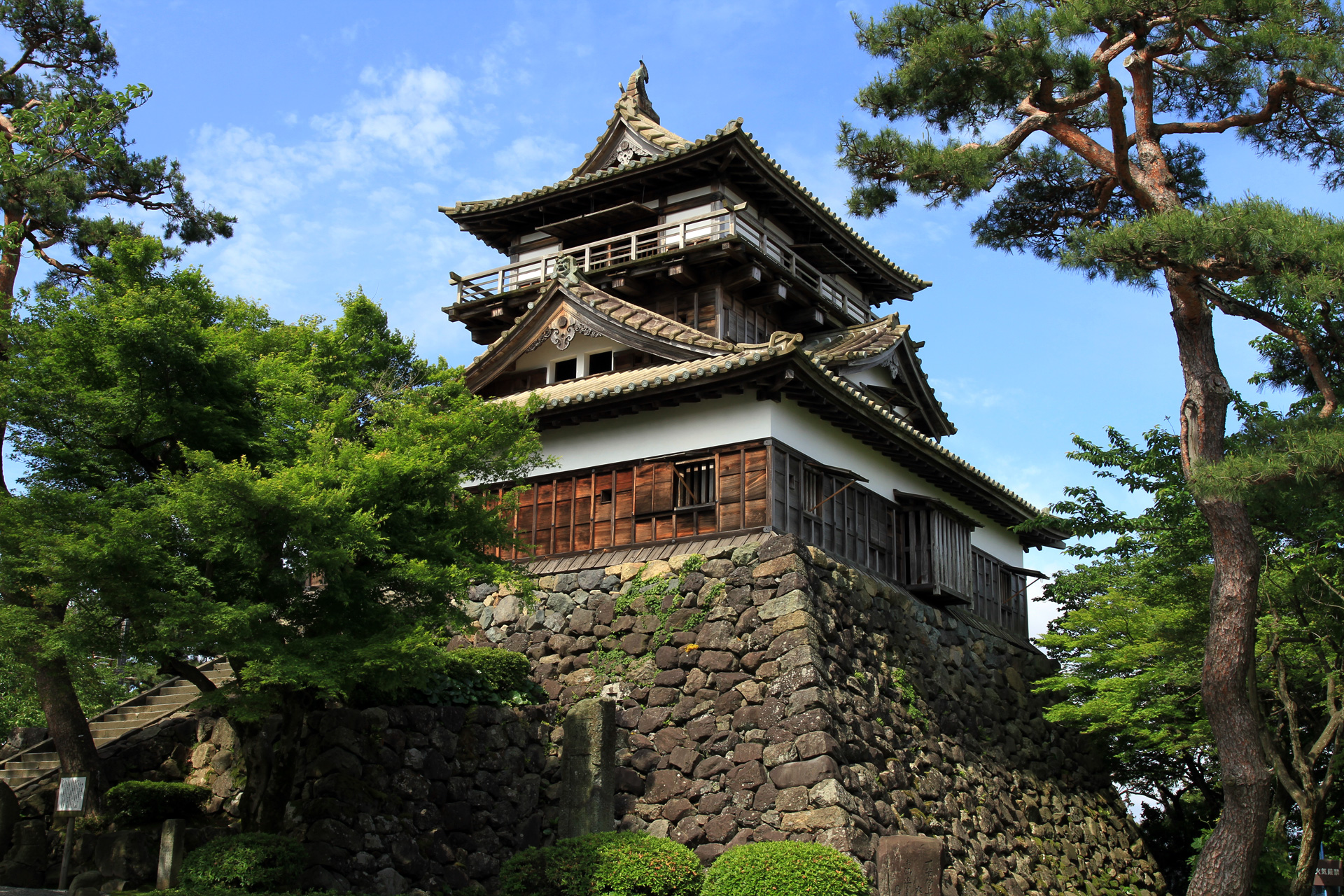
The keep of Maruoka Castle

Maruoka Castle is one of the oldest surviving castles in Japan and is rumored to have been constructed with a human pillar which can be found in the legend of "O-shizu, Hitobashira".

When Shibata Katsutoyo, the nephew of Shibata Katsuie, was building a castle in Maruoka, the stone wall of the castle kept collapsing no matter how many times it was piled up. There was one vassal who suggested that they should make someone a human sacrifice (hitobashira). O-shizu, a partially-blind woman who had two children and lived a poor life, was selected as the hitobashira. She resolved to become one on the condition that one of her children be made a samurai. She was buried under the central pillar of the castle keep. Soon after that the construction of the castle keep was successfully completed. But Katsutoyo was transferred to another province and her son was not made a samurai. Her spirit felt resentful and made the moat overflow with spring rain when the season of cutting algae came in April every year. People called it, "the rain caused by the tears of O-shizu's sorrow" and erected a small tomb to soothe her spirit. There was a poem handed down, "The rain which falls when the season of cutting algae comes Is the rain reminiscent of the tears of the poor O-shizu's sorrow". It has been commented that the instability of the walls of Maruoka Castle was likely caused by the design of the castle. Although built in the Momoyama period (1575–1600) the design is more indicative of earlier fortresses, the steep base features random-style stone piling which is suggested as the source of instability in the walls which may have led to the use of a human pillar during its construction.

==== Matsue Ohashi Bridge ====
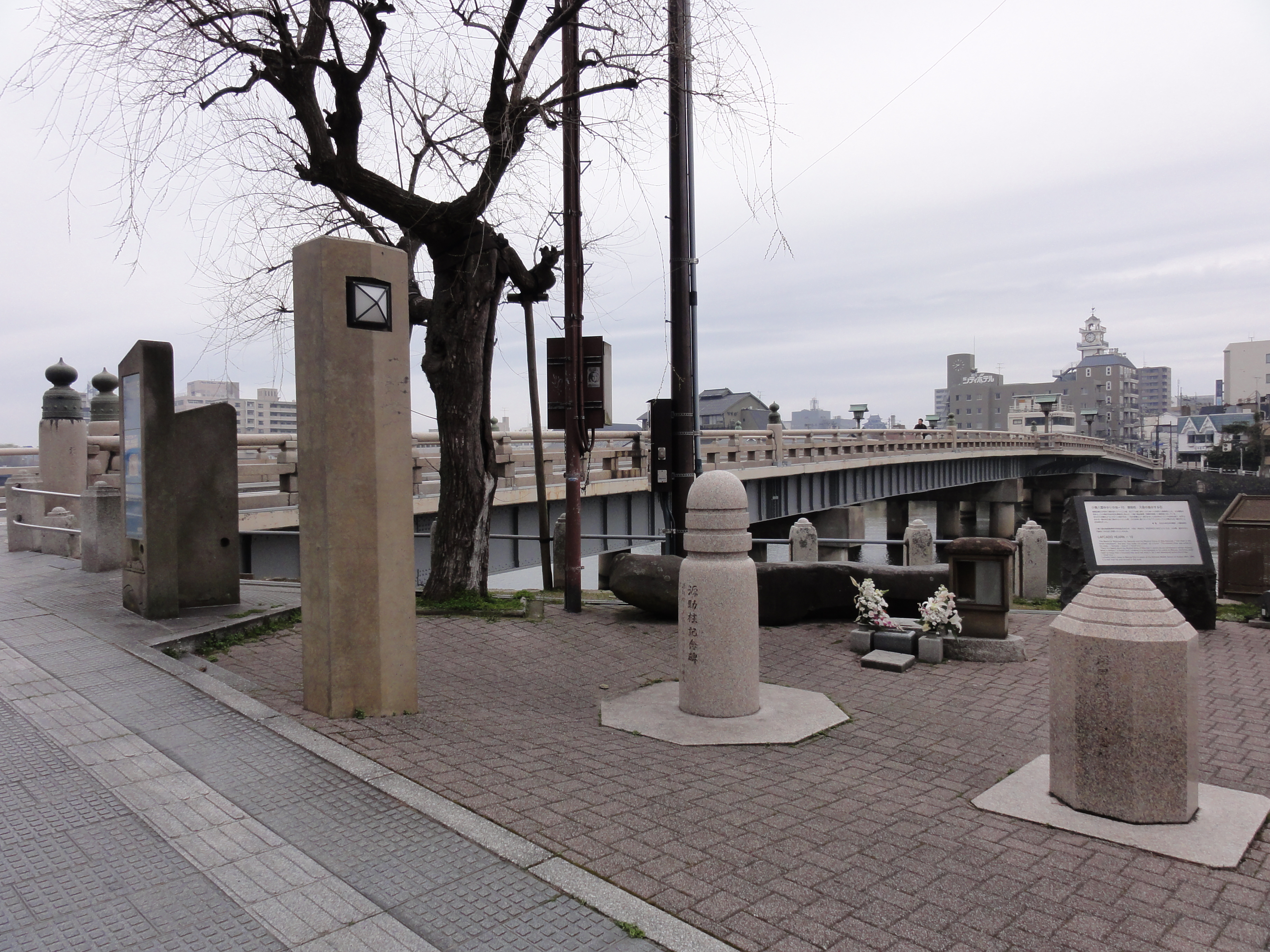
Memorial at the foot of the Matsue Ohashi Bridge

The Matsue Ohashi Bridge according to legend used a human sacrifice in its construction. The nearby park is named Gensuke in honour of the human sacrifice along with a memorial dedicated to the victims who died during the bridge's construction.

When Horio Yoshiharu, the great general who became daimyō of Izumo in the Keichō era, first undertook to put a bridge over the mouth of this river, the builders laboured in vain; for there appeared to be no solid bottom for the pillars of the bridge to rest upon. Millions of great stones were cast into the river to no purpose, for the work constructed by day was swept away or swallowed up by night. Nevertheless, at last the bridge was built, but the pillars began to sink soon after it was finished; then a flood carried half of it away and as often as it was repaired so often it was wrecked. It was then decided that a human sacrifice would be made to appease the vexed spirits of the flood. It was determined that the first man who should cross the bridge wearing a hakama without a machi (a stiff piece of material to keep the folds of the garment perpendicular and neat-looking) should be put under the bridge. A man named Gensuke, who lived on Saikamachi street, passed over the bridge without a machi in his hakama and was taken to be sacrificed. Gensuke was buried alive in the river-bed below the place of the middle pillar, where the current is most treacherous, and thereafter the bridge remained immovable for three hundred years. The middle-most pillar of the bridge was for three hundred years called by his name: "Gensuke-bashira". Some believe the name Gensuke was not the name of a man but the name of an era, in the local dialect. The legend is so profoundly believed, that when the new bridge was built in 1891, many local rural residents were afraid to come to town due to rumors that a new victim was needed, and would be chosen from among them.

It is said this event occurred in 1608.

==== Matsue Castle ====
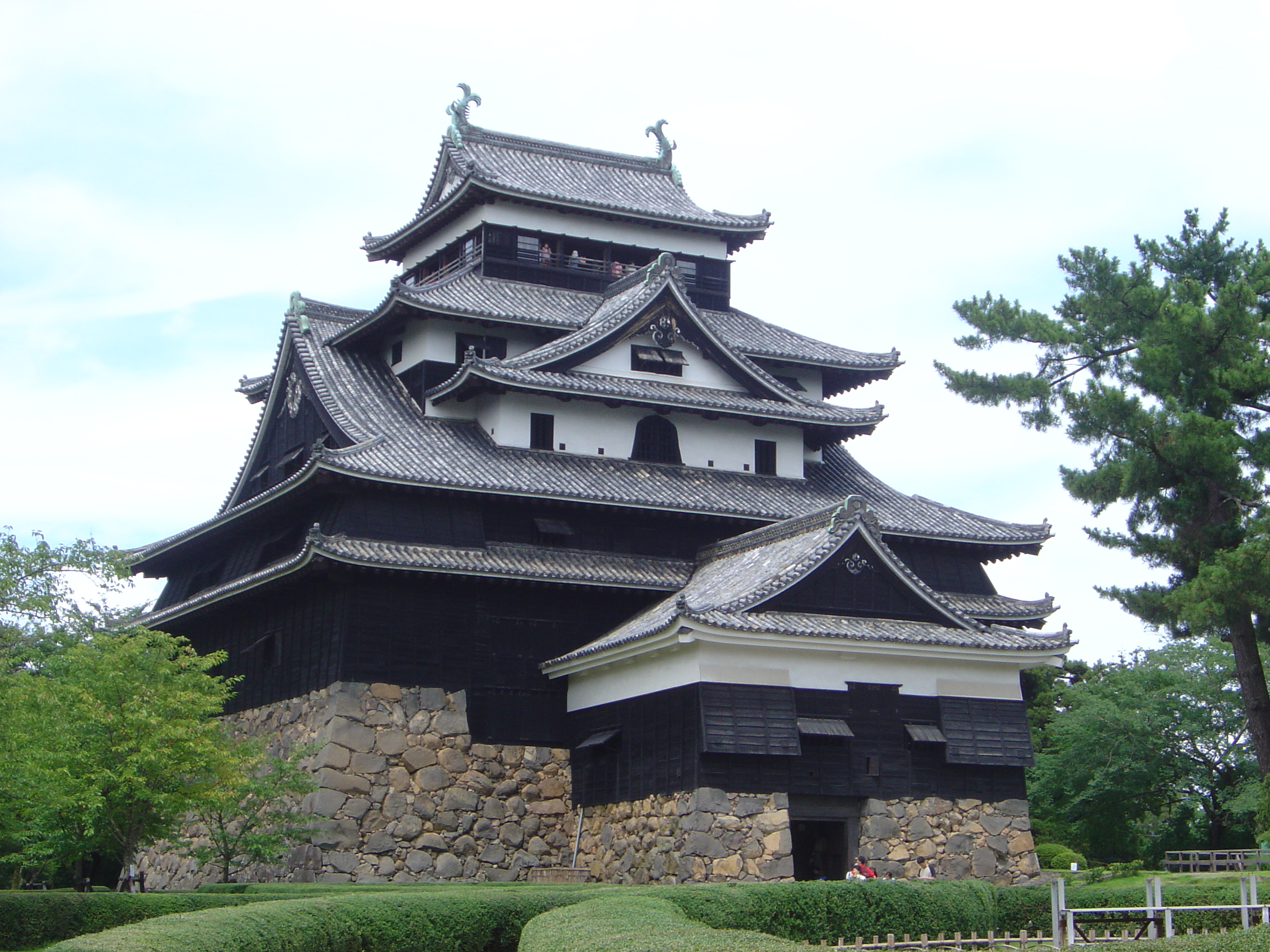
Matsue castle keep

According to legend the Matsue Castle is also said to have been constructed on a human sacrifice that was buried under the castle's stone walls. Her name has never been recorded, and nothing concerning her is remembered except that she is thought to have been a beautiful young maiden who was fond of dancing and is referred to as simply the maiden of Matsue. After the castle was built, a law was passed forbidding any girl to dance in the streets of Matsue because the hill Oshiroyama would shudder and the castle would shake from "top to bottom".

== Da sheng zhuang ==
The earliest archeological evidence of da sheng zhuang is a case discovered in the Dongzhao excavation in Zhengzhou, Henan Province, where the remains of an infant used in the foundation of the Erlitou culture city were found.

== Related practices ==
Another related practice relates to the production of bronzeware and pottery, where ritual sacrifices were referred to as toulushen 投爐神 (thrown to stove deity) or lushengu 爐神姑 (stove goddess) and venerated.

== See also ==
- Immurement § Construction
