= 1948 Ashgabat earthquake =

Earthquake in Turkmenistan

- Location within the Soviet Union
- UTC time: 1948-10-05 20:12:09
- ISC event: 897583
- USGS-ANSS: ComCat
- Local date: 6 October 1948
- Local time: 01:12:09 TMT
- Magnitude: 7.3 M_{s}
- Epicenter: 37.95°N 58.32°E
- Areas affected: Soviet Union (Turkmen SSR), Iran
- Max. intensity: MMI X (Extreme)
- Casualties: 10,000–110,000 dead

The 1948 Ashgabat earthquake (Note: Turkmen: 1948 Aşgabat ýertitremesi; Turkmen Cyrillic: 1948 Ашгабат ертитремеси; Russian: Ашхабадское землетрясение 1948 года, romanized: Ashkhabadskoye zemletryasenie 1948 goda.) was on 6 October with a surface-wave magnitude of 7.3 and a maximum Mercalli intensity of X (Extreme), in Turkmen SSR near Ashgabat. Due to censorship by the Soviet government, the event was not widely reported in the Soviet media. Historians tend to agree that the ban on reporting the extent of the casualties and damage did not allow the Soviet government to allocate enough financial resources to respond adequately. It was the strongest earthquake recorded in Turkmenistan.

== Details ==
The earthquake struck at 1:12 a.m. on October 6, 1948, and lasted 10 seconds, with only two strong shocks reducing the city to rubble. Its epicenter was near the small village of Gara-Gaudan, 25 kilometres southwest of Ashgabat. The earthquake caused extreme damage in Ashgabat and nearby villages, where almost all brick buildings collapsed, concrete structures were heavily damaged, and freight trains were derailed. There were damage and casualties in Darreh Gaz, Iran. Surface rupture was observed northwest and southeast of Ashgabat. Media sources vary on the number of the casualties, from 10,000 to 110,000, equivalent to almost 10% of the Turkmen SSR's population at the time.

According to memories of survivors, the city's infrastructure was badly damaged, with the exception of water pipes. Telephone and telegraph service was cut. The city aerodrome's landing strip was cracked.

Dmitry Nalivkin, a Soviet geologist who was present, ended up in the building of the Central Committee of the Communist Party of Turkmenistan, where, as was customary at that time, there was a night meeting dedicated to the problems of Garabogazköl, described later:

When I came to my senses, I realized that I was still standing at the open window and holding on to the frame, and outside the window there was something incredible, impossible. Instead of a dark transparent starry night, there was an impenetrable milky-white wall in front of me, and behind it terrible groans, screams, cries for help. In a few seconds, the entire old clay, adobe city was destroyed, and in place of the houses, a terrible white veil of dust shot up into the air, hiding everything.

Shortly after the earthquake in one of the military units located on the western outskirts of Ashgabat, the radio operator managed to turn on the emergency lighting. He established radio contact, which was almost immediately interrupted, and managed to broadcast a message about the earthquake. This radiogram was received by Tashkent.

The news of the disaster was able to be sent on the air through the on-board radio station located in the airport and the wounded flight mechanic Yury Drozdov, who reached the Ilyushin Il-12 passenger plane in the dark. This signal was received by signalmen of Sverdlovsk Airport.

Two hours after the earthquake, in Tashkent, the commander of the Turkestan Military District, Army General Ivan Yefimovich Petrov learned about the disaster in Ashgabat. At night, he sent to Moscow the commander-in-chief of the ground forces, Marshal Ivan Konev a message saying the following:

On the night of October 5–6, a strong earthquake occurred in Ashgabat. Communication with Ashgabat is lost. According to fragmentary data, there is severe destruction and casualties. At 9:30 a.m. local time, I will fly to the scene. I'll give you the details.

In the morning, the Central Committee of the Communist Party of Turkmenistan created a republican commission. General Petrov who meanwhile arrived in Ashgabat was also included in this commission, immediately called-in military units from neighboring garrisons. Four divisions were transferred to the city to deal with the consequences of the earthquake. The first trucks with bread from military bakeries began to drive around the city. Electricity was restored six days after the earthquake. The railway station began functioning on the third day. Because most motor vehicles were stored either under the open sky or in light plywood garages, most trucks and passenger automobiles were undamaged and proved critical to delivery of medicine and medical supplies from a destroyed pharmaceutical warehouse. All hospitals were destroyed, so medical treatment was rendered on the municipal parade ground "under the trees".

This earthquake killed future Turkmen president Saparmurat Niyazov's mother Gurbansoltan Eje (his father Atamyrat Nyýazow having been killed during World War II) and the rest of his family, leaving him an orphan. Aid to victims, as well as restoration of basic needs and infrastructure, was provided by the Soviet Army.

== See also ==
- List of earthquakes in 1948
- List of earthquakes in Iran
- Halk Hakydasy Memorial Complex#Monument Ruhy Tagzym: monument to those who died in the earthquake
