= 1948 Litang earthquake =

Earthquake in China

- Location within Sichuan
- UTC time: 1948-05-25 07:11:34
- ISC event: 897351
- USGS-ANSS: ComCat
- Local date: May 25, 1948
- Local time: 15:11:34
- Magnitude: M_{w} 7.2
- Depth: 18 km (11 mi)
- Epicenter: 29.5°N 100.5°E
- Areas affected: China
- Max. intensity: MMI X (Extreme)
- Casualties: 800

The 1948 Litang earthquake (Chinese: 1948年理塘地震; pinyin: 1948nián Lǐtángdìzhèn) occurred on May 25, 1948, at 07:11 UTC. It was located near Litang, China. Now situated in the Sichuan Province, Litang County was then called Lihua (or Lihwa) (理化) County and belonged to the defunct Xikang (or Sikang) Province. The earthquake had a magnitude of M_{w} 7.2, or M_{s} 7.3.

This earthquake caused more than 800 deaths. More than 600 houses collapsed in the areas around Litang and Daocheng. Landslides, ground fissures and sandblows occurred in the region. The intensity of the earthquake reached MM X. Some of the aftershocks caused additional damage.

The earthquake occurred in the middle segment between Litang and Dewu (德巫) of the Litang-Dewu fault zone (理塘-德巫断裂带). Litang Fault, situated in the Sichuan-Yunnan rhombic block (川滇菱形块体), is a NW-trending fault and dominated mainly by left-lateral shear movement. The average horizontal slip rate of the Litang Fault is about 3.2 to 4.4 mm/yr on the Litang-Dewu segment and about 2.6 to 3.0 mm/yr on the segment to the north of Litang. A study of Wang et al. estimated that the Litang fault has a left-lateral strike-slip rate of 4.4±1.3 mm/yr and an extension rate of 2.7±1.1 mm/yr. The focal mechanism was recognized to be a left-lateral slip on a plane striking northwest (315°) for a distance of about 75 km. The released seismic moment was estimated to be about 7.4×10^{19} Nm.

== See also ==
- List of earthquakes in 1948
- List of earthquakes in China
