= 1948 Salta earthquake =

Earthquake in Argentina

- Location within Argentina
- UTC time: 1948-08-25 06:09:28
- ISC event: 897515
- USGS-ANSS: ComCat
- Local date: August 25, 1948
- Local time: 03:09:28
- Magnitude: 7.0 M_{w}
- Depth: 30 km (19 mi)
- Epicenter: 24.57°S 64.82°W
- Areas affected: Salta Province; Argentina
- Max. intensity: MMI IX (Violent)
- Casualties: 2

The 1948 Salta earthquake took place in the Argentinian province of Salta on 25 August at 03:09:28 local time The shock was 7.0 on the moment magnitude scale and had a maximum Mercalli Intensity of IX (Violent). Property damage and casualties occurred in several towns in the east and southeast of Salta, and also in northern Tucumán and Jujuy, affecting the capitals of both. It was the last major earthquake recorded in the Argentine Northwest until the 2010 Salta earthquake.

== See also ==
- List of earthquakes in 1948
- List of earthquakes in Argentina
