= Sakai District, Fukui =

Former district in Fukui prefecture, Japan

Sakai (坂井郡, Sakai-gun) was a district located in Fukui Prefecture, Japan. As of October 1, 2005, the district had an estimated population of 92,312 with a density of 439.77/km^{2} (1,139.0/sq mi). The total area is 209.91 km^{2} (81.05 sq mi).

== Municipalities ==
Prior to its dissolution, the district consisted of six towns:

- Awara (Note: Classified as a town.)
- Harue
- Kanazu
- Maruoka
- Mikuni
- Sakai

== History ==
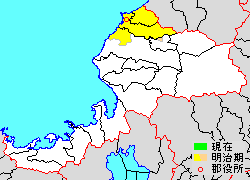
Map showing original extent of Sakai District in Fukui Prefecture: * yellow - areas formerly within the district borders during the early Meiji period

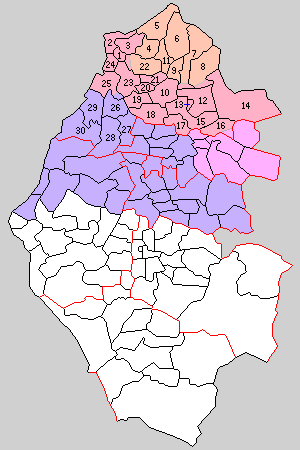
Colored areas are in this district.

=== Recent mergers ===
- On March 1, 2004 - The former town of Awara absorbed the town of Kanazu to form the city of Awara.
- On March 20, 2006 - The former town of Sakai absorbed the towns of Harue, Maruoka and Mikuni to form the city of Sakai. Sakai District was dissolved as a result of this merger.

== See also ==
- List of dissolved districts of Japan
