= Mikuni, Fukui =

Dissolved municipality in Fukui prefecture, Japan

Mikuni (三国町, Mikuni-chō) was a town located in Sakai District, Fukui Prefecture, Japan.

In the 1870s, the Meiji government constructed a harbor at Mikuni, under supervision of the Dutch engineer George Arnold Escher.

As of 2003, the town had an estimated population of 23,207 and a density of 499.94 persons per km^{2}. The total area was 46.42 km^{2}.

On March 20, 2006, Mikuni, along with the towns of Sakai (former), Harue and Maruoka (all from Sakai District), was merged to create the city of Sakai.

Every August there is a fireworks display at Sunset Beach in Mikuni. Many of the fireworks are floating charges distributed by boat. These explode on the water's surface, creating unique effects.
