= Torii Tadayoshi =

Japanese samurai of the Sengoku period

Torii Tadayoshi (鳥居 忠吉, died May 7, 1571) was a Japanese samurai of the mid-Sengoku period. Longtime retainer of Matsudaira Hirotada and later, his son Tokugawa Ieyasu. When Ieyasu was sent to Sunpu Castle to be a hostage to the Imagawa clan, Tadayoshi served alongside Matsudaira Shigeyoshi as castle warden of Okazaki Castle. He was renowned as a model of frugality, eventually saving up enough money by the time Ieyasu returned, in order to rearm the Matsudaira (Tokugawa) clan.

Tadayoshi was a father in law of Honda Shigetsugu. In later years, he was held up as the model Mikawa-era Tokugawa vassal. After he died, his son, Torii Mototada succeeded the Torii family headship.
