= Honda Shigetsugu =

Samurai of the Sengoku era; major samurai ally of the Tokugawa clan

- 本多 重次
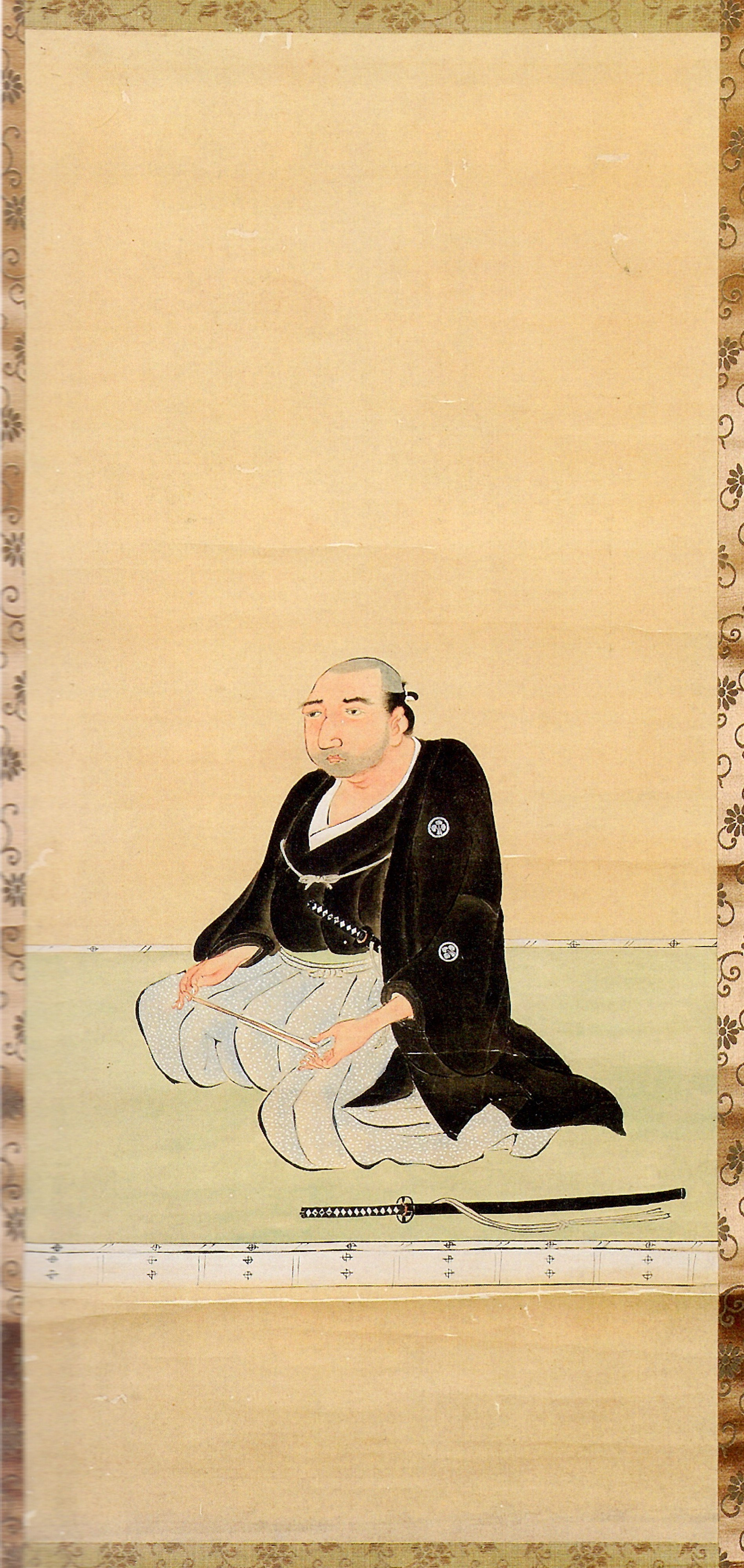

Personal details
- Born: 1529 Mikawa Province
- Died: August 9, 1596 (aged 66–67)
- Spouse: a daughter of Torii Tadayoshi
- Children: Honda Narishige
- Nickname(s): "Ogre Sakuza" "Sakuzaemon"

Military service
- Allegiance: Matsudaira clan Tokugawa clan
- Rank: Bugyō
- Battles/wars: Siege of Terabe (1558); Battle of Azukizaka (1564); Siege of Kakegawa (1569); Battle of Nagashino (1575); Battle of Komaki and Nagakute (1584); Siege of Odawara (1590)

Honda Shigetsugu (本多 重次; 1529 – August 9, 1596), also known as Honda Sakuzaemon (作左衛門), was a Japanese samurai of the Sengoku period through Azuchi-Momoyama Period, who served the Tokugawa clan. He served as one of Ieyasu's "three magistrates" (san-bugyō).

Shigetsugu was nicknamed "Ogre Sakuza" (鬼作左, Oni Sakuza) for his ferocity.

== Biography ==
He was known as Hachizo, Sakujuro, or Saemon. Shigetsugu spouse was a daughter of Torii Tadayoshi, and his son was Honda Narishige who eventually became the lord of the Maruoka Domain of the Echizen Province.

In 1558, he participated in Ieyasu's first battle at the Siege of Terabe Castle, where he distinguished himself. During the Ikko-Ikki Rebellion, he reaffirm his allegiance to Ieyasu, and fought in various places.

Shigetsugu also distinguished himself at Battle of Azukizaka (1564) suppressing the uprising Ikko sect followers in Mikawa Province.

In 1565, he was named one of Mikawa's San-bugyô, or Three Commissioners (along with Amano Yasukage and Koriki Kiyonaga). Shigetsugu was known for his fierceness, Yasukage for his balanced personality, and Kiyonaga for his compassion.

In 1569, during the Siege of Kakegawa Castle in Tōtōmi Province, Shigetsugu worked together with Watanabe Moritsuna, and other Tokugawa samurai fought in close combat, until they manage to breach the castle gate on the night of the 22nd.

In 1575, Shigetsugu fought at the Battle of Nagashino. He launched a single-handed attack on seven or eight enemy horsemen and killed two of them, despite getting injured in seven places himself.

Later, after the Conquest of Koshu in 1582, he became the magistrate of Suruga Province.

In 1584, he participated in the Battle of Komaki and Nagakute.

During the aftermath of the battle of Komaki-Nagakute, Honda Shigetsugu warned Ieyasu about the possibility that Toyotomi Hideyoshi cheating the hostage-exchange agreement by swapping his mother which was agreed to go to Tokugawa clan, with other court ladies. After the Interview with the Toyotomi, Shigetsugu was appointed along with Ii Naomasa and Ōkubo Tadayo in charge of Castle Okazaki. However, there was an incident when Ieyasu was on his way visiting Hideyoshi in Kyōto. Shigetsugu, feared the safety of Ieyasu in Kyōto. Shigetsugu then piled wood blocks around residence of Ōmandokoro, mother of Hideyoshi, who at that time served as hostage and taken residence in Mikawa as part of truce between Tokugawa clan and the Toyotomi Clan. He said that he will burn Ōmandokoro if Something happened to Ieyasu in Kyōto.

In March 1585, when Ieyasu got seriou fell illness, he refused to see Doctor for treatment. Shigetsugu, worried with his lord's condition, came to visit Ieyasu bringing a Tantō blade. Shigetsugu threaten Ieyasu that he will commit suicide with seppuku if Ieyasu doesnt gets a doctor for treatment. Ieyasu relented as he does not want to see Shigetsugu commit suicide, and goes to see a doctor.

At the Siege of Odawara (1590), he intercepted and beat back the naval warriors of Later Hōjō clan led by Kajiwara Kagemune. During this campaign, when Toyotomi Hideoshi passed Mikawa, Hideyoshi wanted ti meet Shigetsugu. However, Shigetsugu refused, which displeased Hideyoshi.

Shigetsugu died in 1596 at the age of 68. It is said that he lost one eye and leg from his battle wounds, and he was missing several fingers.
