= Maruoka, Fukui =

- Interactive map of Maruoka, Fukui
- Country: Japan
- District: Sakai District
- Prefecture: Fukui Prefecture

Maruoka (丸岡町, Maruoka-chō) was a town located in Sakai District, Fukui Prefecture, Japan.

As of 2003, the town had an estimated population of 32,575 and a density of 303.42 persons per km^{2}. The total area was 107.36 km^{2}.

On March 20, 2006, Maruoka, along with the towns of Sakai (former), Harue and Mikuni (all from Sakai District), were merged to create the city of Sakai.

== Sightseeing features ==
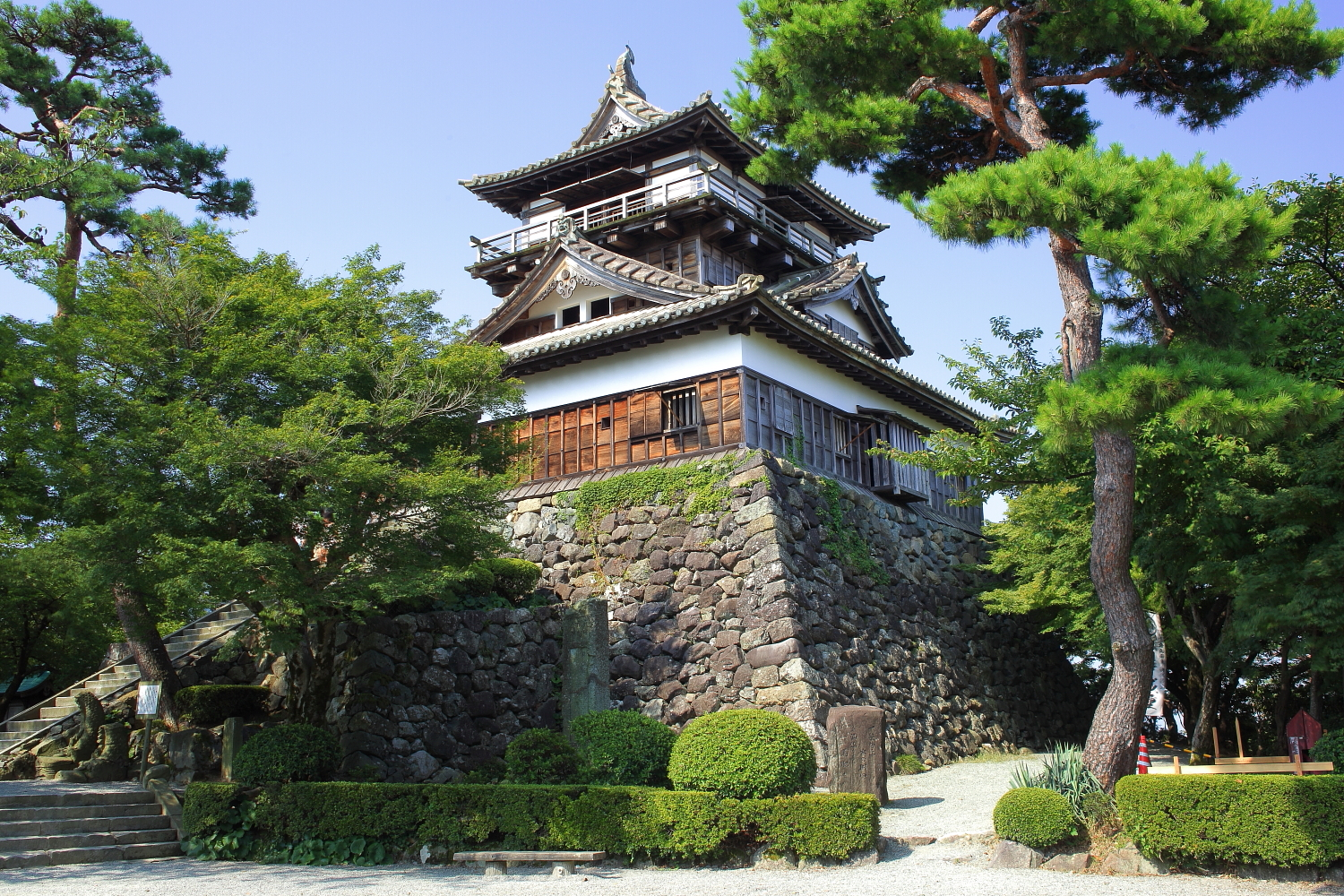
Maruoka Castle Tenshu

Maruoka Castle, built in 1576, is located in Maruoka. Although only the main tower remains, it is the oldest surviving castle in Japan.
