= Harue, Fukui =

Town in Fukui Prefecture, Japan

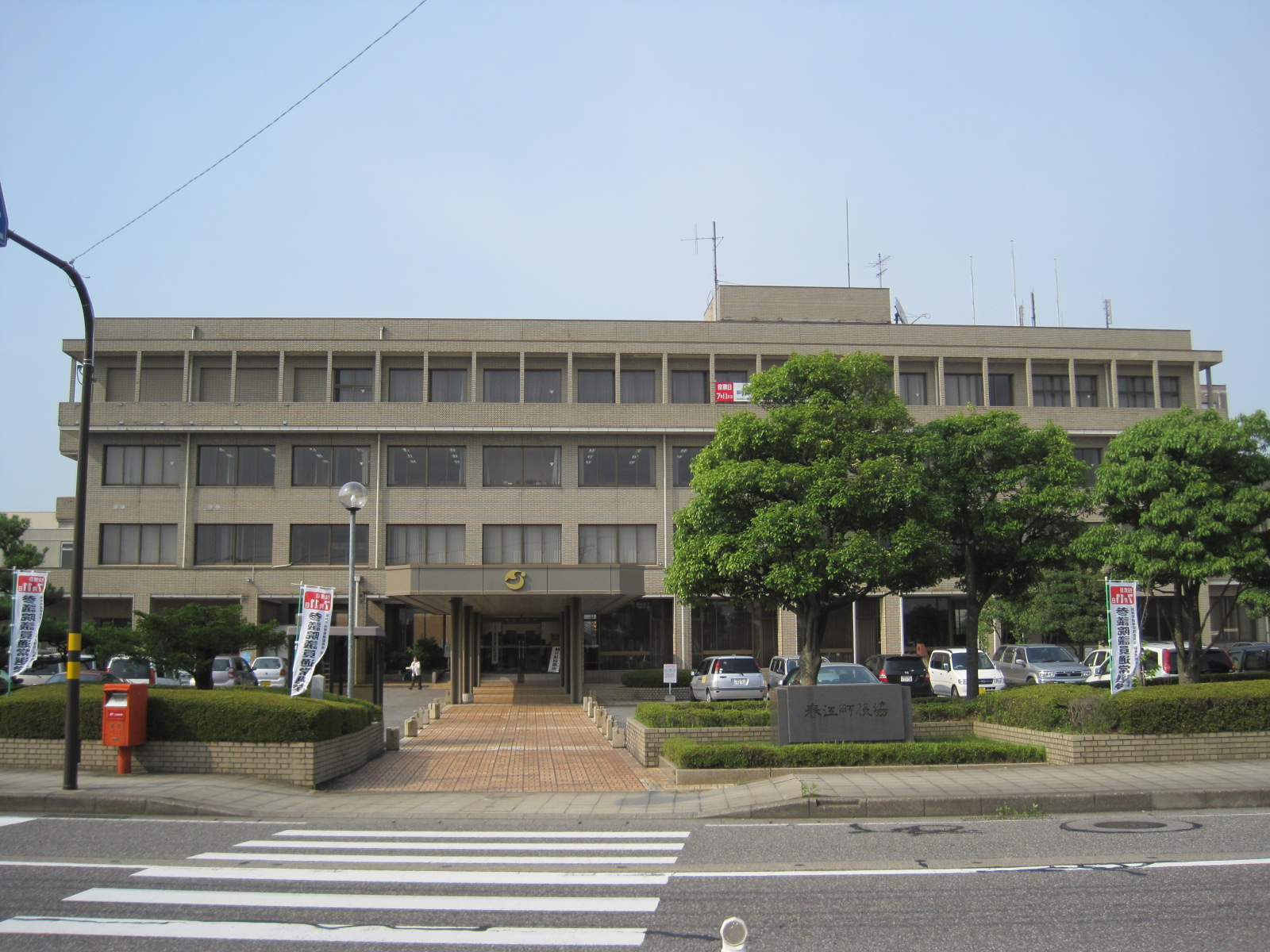
former Harue Town Hall

Harue (春江町, Harue-chō) was a town located in Sakai District, Fukui Prefecture, Japan.

As of 2003, the town had an estimated population of 23,876 and a density of 977.32 persons per km^{2}. The total area was 24.43 km^{2}.

On March 20, 2006, Harue, along with the towns of Sakai (former), Maruoka and Mikuni (all from Sakai District), was merged to create the city of Sakai.
