= Sakai, Fukui =

Sakai 坂井市
- City
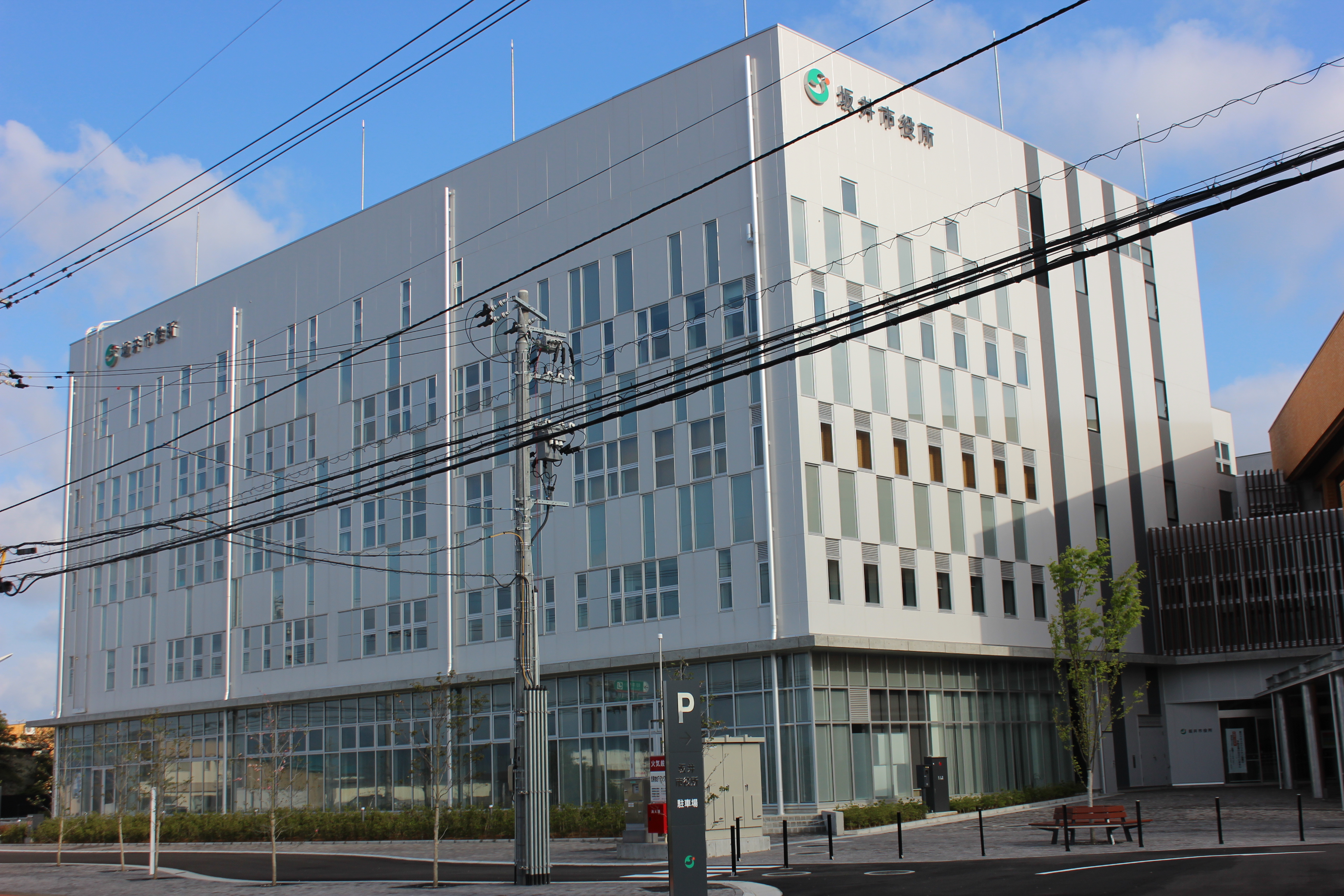
- Sakai City Hall

- Flag Seal

- Location of Sakai in Fukui Prefecture

- Coordinates: 36°10′01″N 136°13′53″E
- Country: Japan
- Region: Chūbu (Hokuriku)
- Prefecture: Fukui

Government
  - - Mayor: Norio Sakamoto

Area
  - Total: 209.67 km^{2} (80.95 sq mi)

Population (February 1, 2026)
  - Total: 87,744
  - Density: 418.49/km^{2} (1,083.9/sq mi)
- Time zone: UTC+9 (Japan Standard Time)
- Phone number: 0776-66-1500
- Address: 1-1 Shimoshinjō, Sakai-chō, Sakai-shi, Fukui-ken 919-0592
- Climate: Cfa
- Website: www.city.fukui-sakai.lg.jp
- Symbols
- Bird: Common gull
- Flower: Lily
- Tree: Cherry blossom

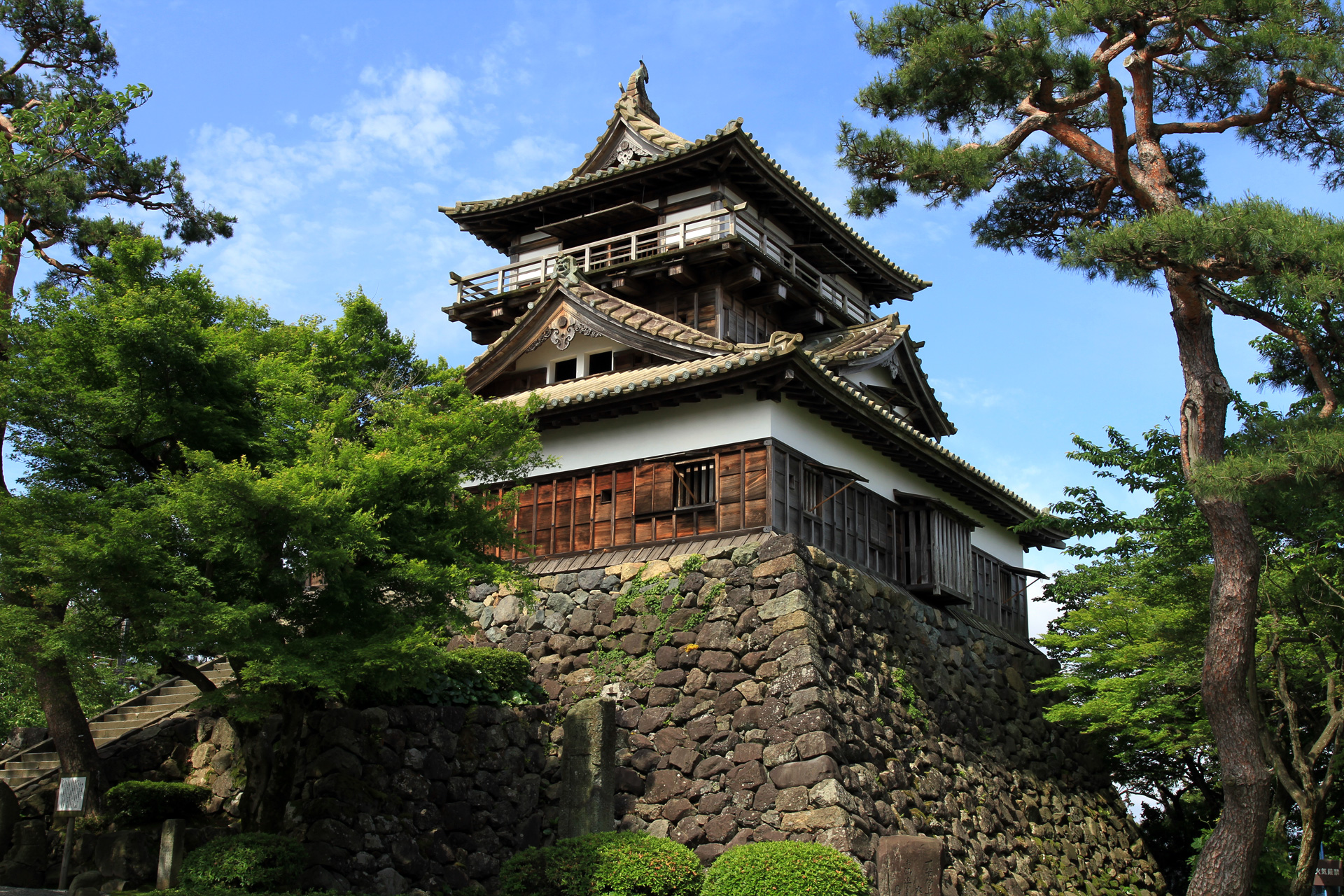
Maruoka Castle

Sakai (坂井市, Sakai-shi; Japanese pronunciation: [saꜜ.kai, sa.kaꜜi.ɕi]) is a city located in Fukui Prefecture, Japan. As of 1 February 2026, the city had an estimated population of 87,744 in 34,042 households and a population density of 418 persons per km^{2}. The total area of the city was 209.67 square kilometres (80.95 sq mi).

== Geography ==
Sakai is located in far northern Fukui Prefecture, bordered by the city of Awara and Ishikawa Prefecture to the north and the Sea of Japan to the northeast, The city of Fukui borders the city to the south. The Kuzuryū River flows through the city to the Sea of Japan. Most the urban area lies within the Kuzuryu River basin. North of the river's mouth in the former Mikuni Town, there are many rocky areas, including the cliffs of Tōjinbō. To the east is the Kaetsu Plateau, and south of the river's mouth is the sandy beach of Sanrihama. While there are mountainous areas with an elevation of approximately 1,000 meters in the eastern part of the former Maruoka Town.

=== Neighbouring municipalities ===
Fukui Prefecture

- Awara
- Eiheiji
- Fukui
- Katsuyama

Ishikawa Prefecture

- Kaga

=== Climate ===
Sakai has a humid subtropical climate per the Köppen climate classification system, characterized by warm, wet summers and cold winters with heavy snowfall. The average annual temperature in Sakai is 14.3 °C. The average annual rainfall is 2476 mm with September as the wettest month. The temperatures are highest on average in August, at around 26.9 °C, and lowest in January, at around 2.8 °C.

Climate data for Mikuni, Sakai (1991−2020 normals, extremes 1978−present)
Month	Jan	Feb	Mar	Apr	May	Jun	Jul	Aug	Sep	Oct	Nov	Dec	Year
Record high °C (°F)	16.4 (61.5)	20.9 (69.6)	26.9 (80.4)	28.8 (83.8)	33.4 (92.1)	34.9 (94.8)	38.9 (102.0)	39.7 (103.5)	37.6 (99.7)	32.3 (90.1)	26.6 (79.9)	21.8 (71.2)	39.7 (103.5)
Mean daily maximum °C (°F)	6.9 (44.4)	7.4 (45.3)	11.0 (51.8)	16.3 (61.3)	21.1 (70.0)	24.3 (75.7)	28.4 (83.1)	30.2 (86.4)	26.2 (79.2)	21.0 (69.8)	15.5 (59.9)	9.8 (49.6)	18.2 (64.7)
Daily mean °C (°F)	3.5 (38.3)	3.7 (38.7)	6.7 (44.1)	11.8 (53.2)	16.7 (62.1)	20.5 (68.9)	24.7 (76.5)	26.2 (79.2)	22.3 (72.1)	16.8 (62.2)	11.2 (52.2)	6.1 (43.0)	14.2 (57.5)
Mean daily minimum °C (°F)	0.5 (32.9)	0.4 (32.7)	2.7 (36.9)	7.5 (45.5)	12.8 (55.0)	17.4 (63.3)	21.9 (71.4)	23.0 (73.4)	18.8 (65.8)	13.0 (55.4)	7.3 (45.1)	2.8 (37.0)	10.7 (51.2)
Record low °C (°F)	−6.8 (19.8)	−6.8 (19.8)	−4.0 (24.8)	−1.6 (29.1)	3.4 (38.1)	9.4 (48.9)	14.4 (57.9)	15.0 (59.0)	9.0 (48.2)	2.5 (36.5)	−0.5 (31.1)	−4.4 (24.1)	−6.8 (19.8)
Average precipitation mm (inches)	206.9 (8.15)	123.6 (4.87)	138.3 (5.44)	125.0 (4.92)	139.8 (5.50)	155.4 (6.12)	228.4 (8.99)	147.1 (5.79)	218.2 (8.59)	159.8 (6.29)	182.8 (7.20)	253.9 (10.00)	2,079.2 (81.86)
Average precipitation days (≥ 1.0 mm)	23.4	18.1	15.5	11.6	10.6	10.7	12.0	8.8	11.6	12.5	16.6	23.4	174.8
Mean monthly sunshine hours	56.5	93.3	152.0	190.0	213.4	170.4	179.6	228.9	165.4	158.3	107.0	65.1	1,777.1
Source: Japan Meteorological Agency

Climate data for Harue, Fukui (2003−2020 normals, extremes 2003−present)
Month	Jan	Feb	Mar	Apr	May	Jun	Jul	Aug	Sep	Oct	Nov	Dec	Year
Record high °C (°F)	15.7 (60.3)	20.7 (69.3)	27.3 (81.1)	31.1 (88.0)	34.3 (93.7)	34.2 (93.6)	39.0 (102.2)	37.5 (99.5)	37.2 (99.0)	32.5 (90.5)	26.5 (79.7)	23.8 (74.8)	39.0 (102.2)
Mean daily maximum °C (°F)	6.6 (43.9)	7.7 (45.9)	11.9 (53.4)	17.6 (63.7)	22.9 (73.2)	26.2 (79.2)	29.8 (85.6)	31.8 (89.2)	27.7 (81.9)	22.0 (71.6)	16.1 (61.0)	9.6 (49.3)	19.2 (66.5)
Daily mean °C (°F)	3.1 (37.6)	3.8 (38.8)	7.1 (44.8)	12.4 (54.3)	18.0 (64.4)	22.0 (71.6)	25.8 (78.4)	27.2 (81.0)	23.1 (73.6)	17.1 (62.8)	11.5 (52.7)	5.9 (42.6)	14.8 (58.6)
Mean daily minimum °C (°F)	0.2 (32.4)	0.3 (32.5)	2.6 (36.7)	7.3 (45.1)	13.4 (56.1)	18.3 (64.9)	22.5 (72.5)	23.6 (74.5)	19.3 (66.7)	12.9 (55.2)	7.5 (45.5)	2.6 (36.7)	10.9 (51.6)
Record low °C (°F)	−6.9 (19.6)	−6.8 (19.8)	−3.4 (25.9)	−1.9 (28.6)	4.3 (39.7)	9.8 (49.6)	17.1 (62.8)	15.1 (59.2)	11.0 (51.8)	3.9 (39.0)	−0.2 (31.6)	−5.9 (21.4)	−6.9 (19.6)
Average precipitation mm (inches)	180.7 (7.11)	112.4 (4.43)	129.5 (5.10)	125.5 (4.94)	136.3 (5.37)	139.8 (5.50)	241.4 (9.50)	148.8 (5.86)	225.3 (8.87)	157.0 (6.18)	167.2 (6.58)	278.5 (10.96)	2,029.9 (79.92)
Average precipitation days (≥ 1.0 mm)	21.7	15.3	14.6	11.5	10.3	10.1	12.7	9.0	11.9	11.8	16.1	23.2	168.2
Source: Japan Meteorological Agency

== Demographics ==
Per Japanese census data, the population of Sakai has recently plateaued after a long period of growth. Sakai is the second most populous city in Fukui Prefecture. The Harue and Maruoka neighborhoods in the southern part of the city function as commuter towns for the city of Fukui.

Historical population
Year	Pop.	±%
1970	68,797	—
1980	75,983	+10.4%
1990	83,372	+9.7%
2000	91,173	+9.4%
2010	91,900	+0.8%
2020	88,481	−3.7%

== History ==
Sakai is part of the ancient Echizen Province. The semi-legendary Kofun period Emperor Keitai is said to have come from the area that is now the Maruoka neighbourhood of Sakai. During the Edo period, the area was divided between the holdings of the Maruoka Domain, Fukui Domain and tenryō holdings directly under control of the Tokugawa shogunate. Following the Meiji restoration, the area was organised into part of Sakai District in Fukui Prefecture. The epicentre of the 1948 Fukui earthquake was in Maruoka. The towns of Mikuni and Maruoka were created with the establishment of the modern municipalities system on April 1, 1889. The village of Harue was raised to town status on April 3, 1942. The village of Sakai was created on March 1, 1955, by the merger of the villages of Higashi-Jūgō, Hyōgo and Ōseki. It was raised to town status on April 1, 1961. The modern city of Sakai was established on March 20, 2006, from the merger of the former town of Sakai with the towns of Harue, Maruoka and Mikuni. Sakai District was dissolved as a result of this merger.

== Government ==
Sakai has a mayor-council form of government with a directly elected mayor and a unicameral city legislature of 26 members. Sakai contributes four members to the Fukui Prefectural Assembly. In terms of national politics, the city is part of the Fukui 1st district of the lower house of the Diet of Japan.

== Economy ==
Sakai is a regional commercial center with a mixed economy. Agriculture is centered on Koshihikari rice production and "Wakasa" brand wagyu beef. Industry is centered n the Fukui Coastal Industrial Zone (Technoport Fukui) and includes steel production, pharmaceuticals and chemicals.

== Education ==
Sakai has 19 public elementary schools and five middle schools operated by the city government, and three public high school operated by the Fukui Prefectural Board of Education. The prefecture also operates one special education school.

=== High schools ===
- Maruoka Senior High School
- Mikuni Senior High School
- Sakai Senior High School

== Transportation ==
=== Airport ===
- Fukui Airport (No scheduled flight services.)

=== Railway ===
As of 16 March 2024, JR West no longer operates in Sakai as its operations on the Hokuriku Main Line were transferred to third-sector company Hapi-line Fukui.

Hapi-line Fukui

- Harue - Maruoka

Echizen Railway Mikuni Awara Line

- Taromaru Angelland - Nishiharue Heartpia - Nishinagata Yurinosato - Shimohyogo Kofuku - Ōzeki - (Awara-shi) - Mizui - Mikuni-Jinja - Mikuni - Mikuni-Minato

=== Highway ===
- Hokuriku Expressway
- National Route 8
- National Route 305
- National Route 364

== Local attractions ==
- Echizen-Kaga Kaigan Quasi-National Park
- Maruoka Castle, one of the 100 Famous Castles of Japan
- Maruoka Domain Battery, National Historic Site
- Mikuni Onsen
- Rokuroseyama Kofun Cluster, National Historic Site
- Technoport Fukui Stadium
- Tōjinbō, National Site of Scenic Beautyand Natural Monument
- Takidan-ji gardens, National Site of Scenic Beauty
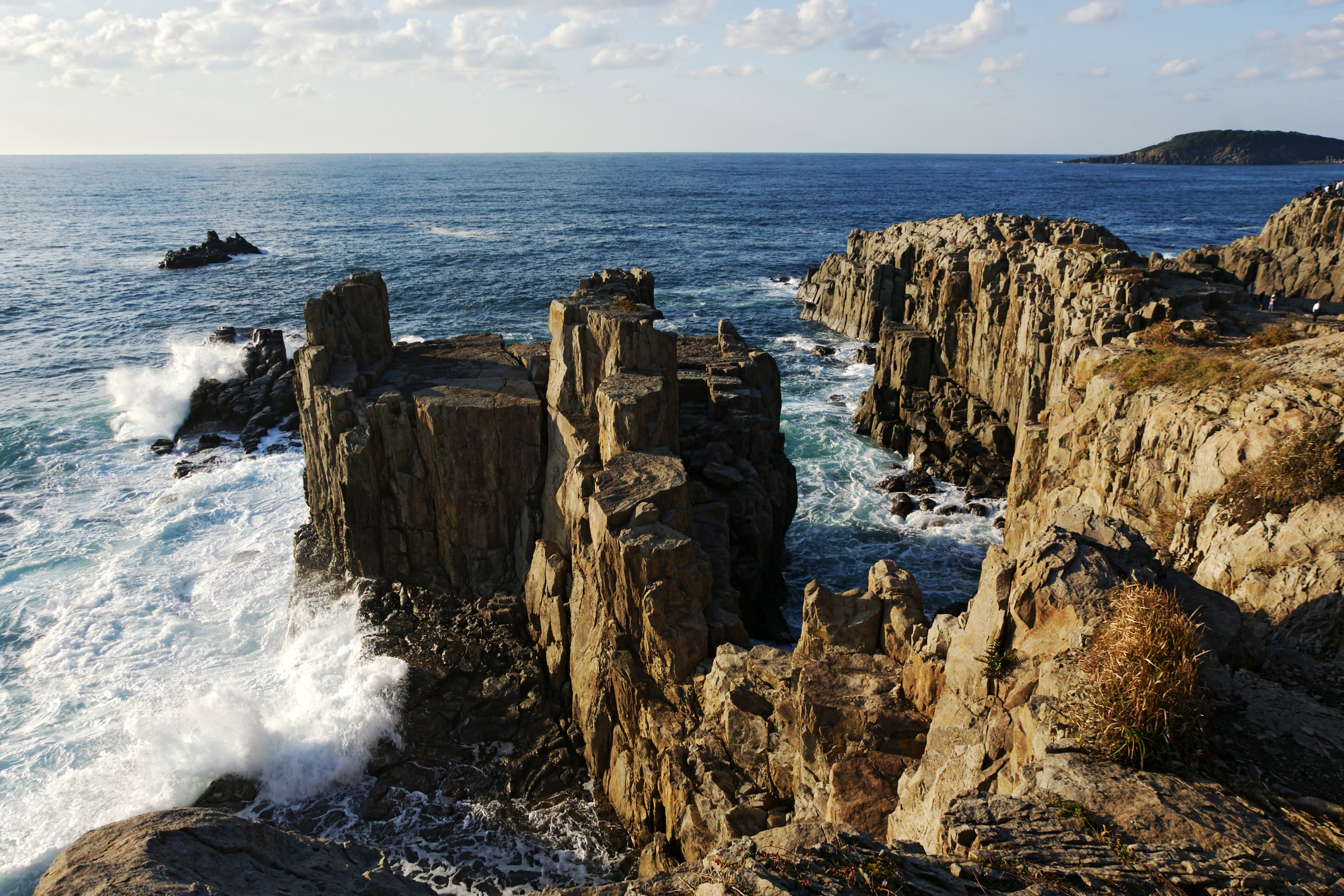
Tōjinbō

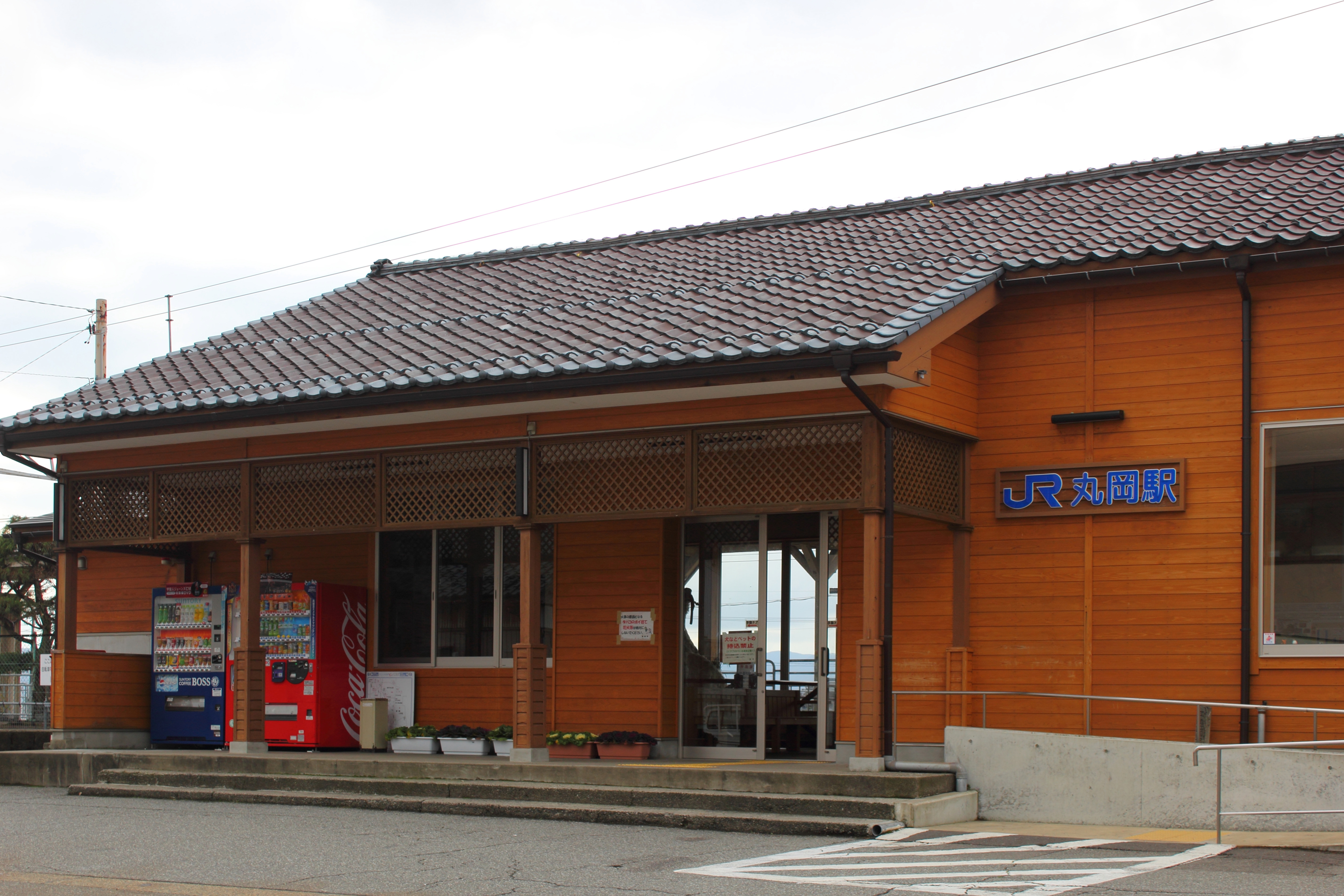
JR Maruoka Station

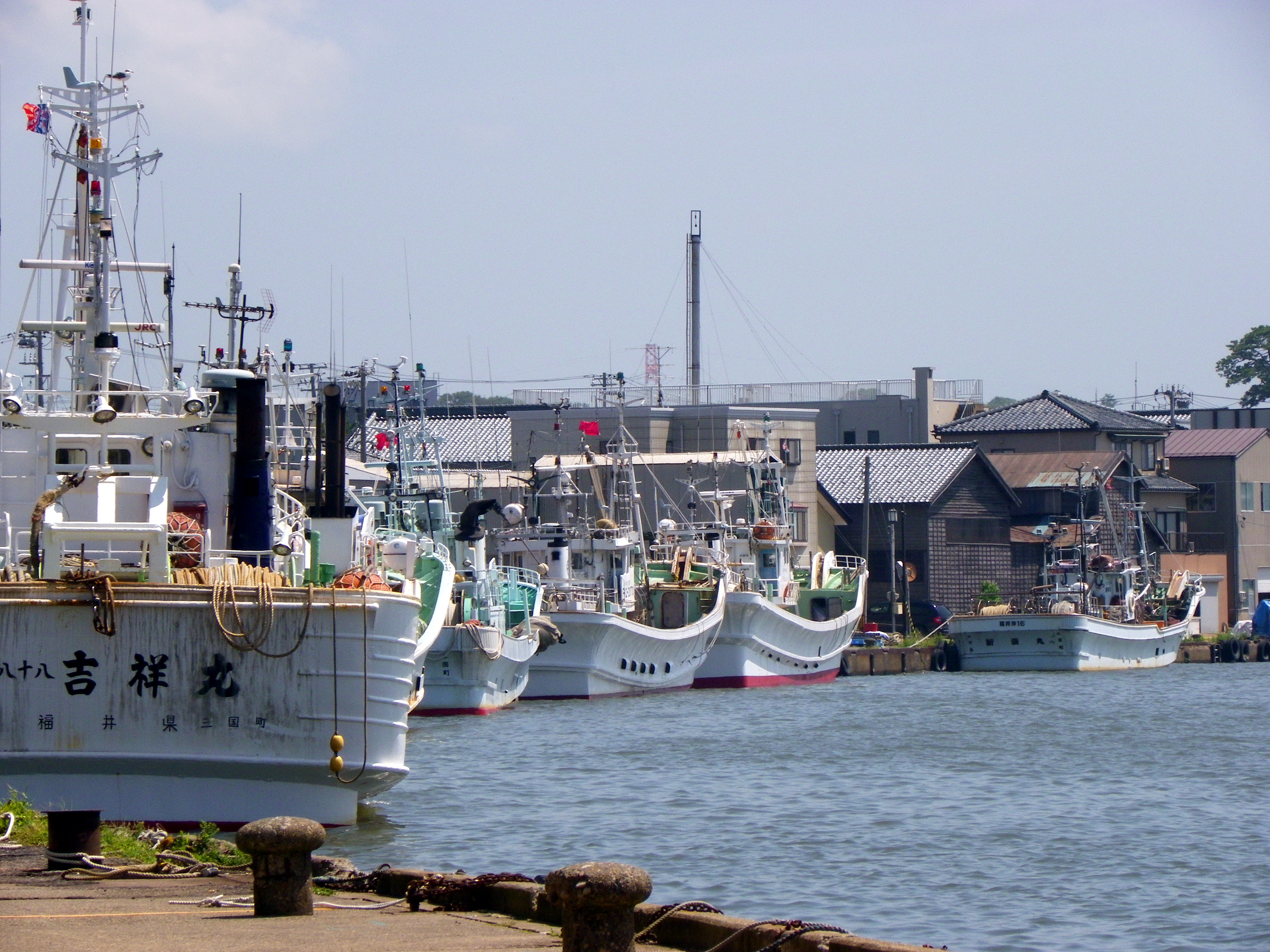
Mikuni Port

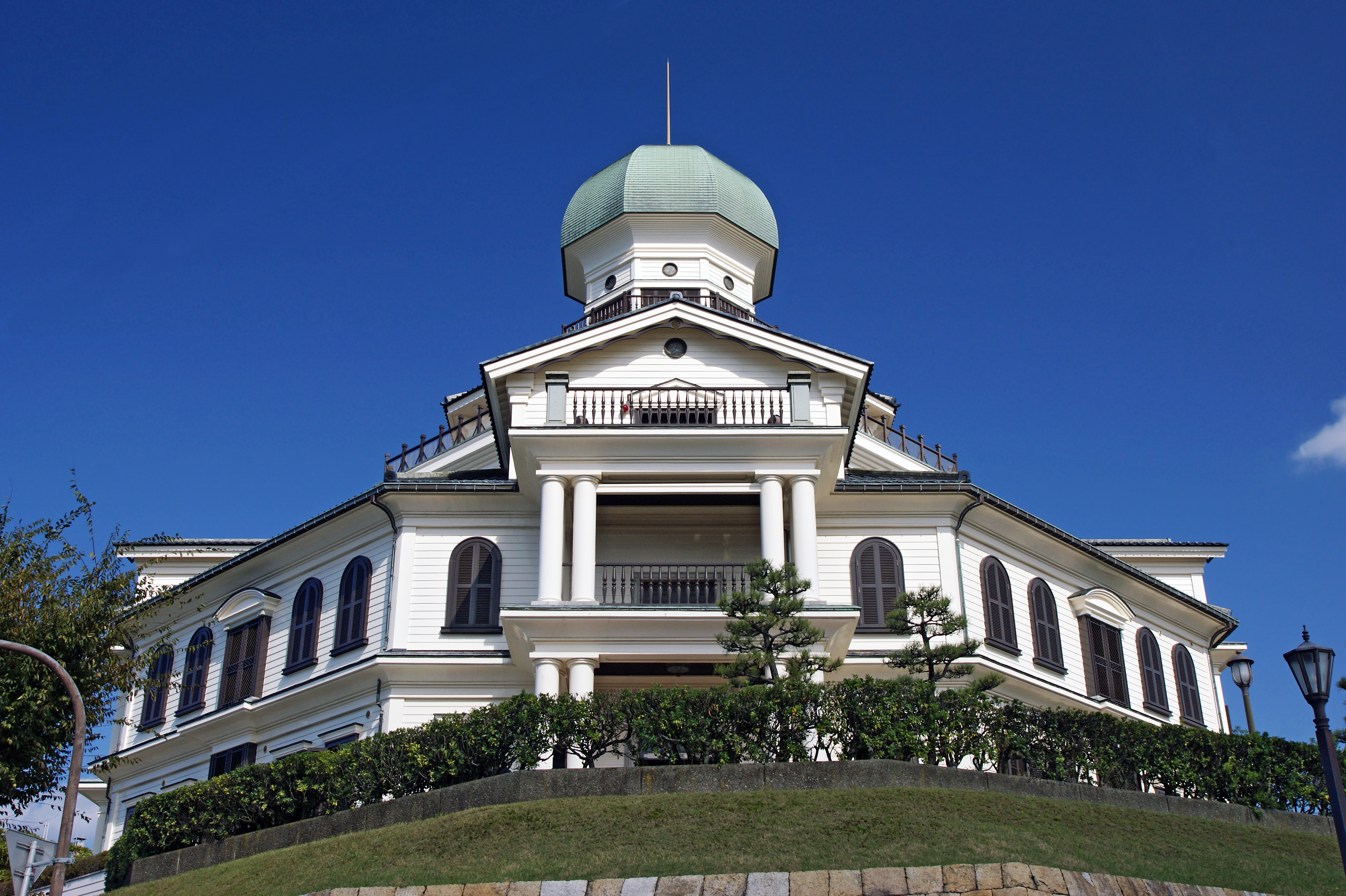
Mikuni Ryushokan

== Notable people ==
- Chosei Komatsu (from Mikuni) – artistic director of the National Symphony Orchestra of Costa Rica
- Kazuhiko Masada (from Mikuni) - Japanese professional wrestler and member of Tokyo Gurentai
- Shigeharu Nakano (from Maruoka) - author and Communist Party politician
- Ai Takahashi (from Harue) – former leader of Japanese idol group Morning Musume
