= List of monarchists =

Monarchism is the advocacy of the system of monarchy or monarchical rule. A monarchist is an individual who supports this form of government independent of any specific monarch, whereas one who supports a particular monarch is a royalist. Conversely, the opposition to monarchical rule is referred to as republicanism.

Depending on the country, a royalist may advocate for the rule of the person who sits on the throne, a regent, a pretender, or someone who would otherwise occupy the throne but has been deposed.

== Albania ==
- Pandeli Evangjeli (1859–1949)
- Salih Vuçitërni (1880–1949)
- Ismet Bey Kryeziu (1889–1952)
- Abaz Kupi (1892–1976)
- Prenk Pervizi (1897–1977)
- Tahir Dizdari (1900–1972)
- Crown Prince Leka Zogu I (1939–2011)
- Ekrem Spahiu (born 1960)
- Crown Prince Leka Zogu II (born 1982)

== American ==
- Lewis Nicola (1717–1807)
- Nathaniel Gorham (1738–1796)
- Alexander Hamilton (1755 or 1757–1804)
- James Strang (1813–1856)
- Joshua Norton (1818–1880)
- Ralph Adams Cram (1863–1942)
- Solange Hertz (1920–2015)
- Leland B. Yeager (1924–2018)
- Lee Walter Congdon (born 1939)
- Robert Jordan (1948–2007)
- Charles A. Coulombe (born 1960)
- Michael Auslin (born 1967)
- Curtis Yarvin (born 1973)
- Stanley Kubrick (1928-1999)

=== Hawaiian ===
- Samuel Nowlein (1851–1905)
- Lydia Liliuokalani Kawānanakoa (1905–1969)
- Abigail Kinoiki Kekaulike Kawānanakoa (1926–2022)
- Owana Salazar (born 1953)

== Argentine ==
- Manuel Belgrano (1770–1820)

== Australian ==
- Arthur Groom (1904–1953)
- Joan Sutherland (1926–2010)
- Tony Abbott (born 1957)
- Sophie Mirabella (born 1968)
- Scott Morrison (born 1968)

== Austrian ==
- Georg von Trapp (1880–1947)
- Engelbert Dollfuss (1892-1934)
- Joseph Roth (1894–1939)
- Kurt Schuschnigg (1897-1977)
- Erik von Kuehnelt-Leddihn (1909–1999)
- Ernst Fuchs (1930–2015)

== Belgian ==
- Hergé (1903–1983)
- Leon Degrelle (1906–1994)

== Brazilian ==
- José Bonifácio (1763–1838)
- Maria Quitéria (1792–1853)
- Baron of Taunay (1795–1881)
- Duke of Caxias (1803–1880)
- Count of Porto Alegre (1804–1875)
- Viscount of Itajubá (1805–1884)
- Baron of Santo Ângelo (1806–1879)
- Viscount of Rio Branco (1819–1880)
- João Lustosa da Cunha Paranaguá, Marquis of Paranaguá (1821–1912)
- José de Alencar (1829–1877)
- Antônio Conselheiro (1830–1897)
- Gaspar da Silveira Martins (1835–1901)
- Carlos Gomes (1836–1896)
- Afonso Celso, Viscount of Ouro Preto (1836–1912)
- André Rebouças (1838–1898)
- Machado de Assis (1839–1908)
- Joaquim Nabuco (1839–1910)
- Viscount of Taunay (1843–1899)
- Baron of Rio Branco (1845–1912)
- José do Patrocínio (1853–1905)
- Alberto Santos-Dumont (1873–1932)
- Monteiro Lobato (1882–1948)
- Câmara Cascudo (1898–1986)
- Arlindo Veiga dos Santos (1902–1978)
- Plinio Corrêa de Oliveira (1908–1995)
- José Osvaldo de Meira Penna (1917–2017)
- Ariano Suassuna (1927–2014)
- Prince Bertrand of Orléans-Braganza (born 1941)
- Gilberto Callado (born 1956)
- Delegado Waldir (born 1962)
- Márcio Bittar (born 1963)
- Luiz Philippe of Orléans-Braganza (born 1969)
- Carla Zambelli (born 1980)
- Paulo Eduardo Martins (born 1981)
- Enrico Misasi (born 1994)

== British ==
- Winston Churchill (1874–1965)
- T.S. Eliot (1888–1965)
- Agatha Christie (1890–1976)
- J.R.R. Tolkien (1892–1973)
- Hector Bolitho (1897–1974)
- C.S. Lewis (1898–1963)
- John Betjeman (1906–1984)
- Harold Wilson (1916–1995)
- Anthony Burgess (1917–1993)
- Peregrine Worsthorne (1923–2020)
- Mary Warnock, Baroness Warnock (1924–2019)
- Joan Collins (born 1933)
- Alan Bennett (born 1933)
- Judi Dench (born 1934)
- Nikolai Tolstoy (1935)
- John Major (born 1943)
- Simon Blackburn (born 1944)
- Tony Blair (born 1953)
- Ian Botham (born 1955)
- Stephen Fry (born 1957)
- Rupert Everett (born 1959)
- Peter Whittle (born 1961)
- Tracey Emin (born 1963)
- Peter Morgan (born 1963)
- Rachel Johnson (born 1965)
- Piers Morgan (born 1965)
- David Cameron (born 1966)
- David Beckham (born 1975)

== Canadian ==
- George-Étienne Cartier (1814–1873)
- John A. Macdonald (1815–1891)
- Alexander Tilloch Galt(1817–1893)
- Thomas D'Arcy McGee (1825–1868)
- Henri-Gustave Joly de Lotbinière (1829–1908)
- Emily Carr (1871–1945)
- William Lyon Mackenzie King (1874–1950)
- David Milne (1882–1953)
- Louis St. Laurent (1882–1973)
- Vincent Massey (1887–1967)
- Georges Vanier (1888–1967)
- Conn Smythe (1895–1980)
- John Diefenbaker (1895–1979)
- Lester B. Pearson (1897–1972)
- Eugene Forsey (1904–1991)
- George Montegu Black II (1911–1976)
- Robertson Davies (1913–1995)
- George Grant (1918–1988)
- Pierre Trudeau (1919–2000)
- Nancy Bell (1924–1989)
- Robert Layton (1925–2002)
- Glenn Gould (1932–1982)
- Jean Chrétien (born 1934)
- Don Cherry (born 1934)
- Margaret Atwood (born 1939)
- Charles Pachter (born 1942)
- Michael Valpy (born 1942)
- John Fraser (born 1944)
- Jack Layton (1950–2011)
- Kevin S. MacLeod (born 1951)
- Andrew Coyne (born 1960)
- Ray Novak (born 1977)

== Chinese ==
- Zhang Xun (1854–1923)
- Xu Shichang (1855–1939)
- Kang Youwei (1858–1927)
- Yuan Shikai (1859–1916)
- Zhang Zuolin (1875–1928)

== Costa Rican ==
- Tranquilino de Bonilla y Herdocia (1797–1864)
- José Rafael Gallegos (1784–1850)
- Manuel María de Peralta y López del Corral (?–1837)

== Croatian ==
- Josip Frank (1844–1911)

== Czech ==
- Adolf Born (1930–2016)
- Miroslav Štěpánek (1923–2005)

== Fijian ==
- George Cakobau (1912–1989)
- Penaia Ganilau (1918–1993)
- Kamisese Mara (1920–2004)

== French ==
- Jacques-Bénigne Bossuet (1627–1704)
- Thomas de Mahy, Marquis de Favras (1744–1790)
- Joseph de Maistre (1753–1821)
- Armand-Emmanuel de Vignerot du Plessis, duc de Richelieu (1766–1822)
- Jacques Laffitte (1767–1844)
- François-René de Chateaubriand (1768–1848)
- Joseph de Villèle (1773–1854)
- Casimir Pierre Périer (1777–1832)
- Jules de Polignac (1780–1847)
- Élie, duc Decazes (1780–1860)
- Casimir-Louis-Victurnien de Rochechouart de Mortemart (1787–1875)
- Pierre-Antoine Berryer (1790–1868)
- Honoré de Balzac (1799–1850)
- Jacques Crétineau-Joly (1803–1875)
- Auguste-Alexandre Ducrot (1817–1882)
- Louis Gaston Adrien de Ségur (1820–1881)
- Louis Billot (1846–1931)
- Henri de Gaulle (1848–1932)
- Henri Vaugeois (1864–1916)
- Charles Maurras (1868–1952)
- Jacques Bainville (1879–1936)
- Pierre Benoit (1886–1962)
- Henri d'Astier de la Vigerie (1897–1952)
- Thierry Maulnier (1909–1988)
- Georges-Paul Wagner (1921–2006)
- Jean Raspail (1925–2020)
- Pierre Pujo (1929–2007)
- Eric Zemmour (born 1958)

== German ==
- Fedor von Bock (1880–1945)
- August von Mackensen (1849–1945)
- Carl Friedrich Goerdeler (1884–1945)
- Franz Josef Strauss (1915–1988)
- Otto von Bismarck (1815–1898)

== Greek ==
- Ioannis Metaxas (1871–1941)
- Dimitrios Gounaris (1867–1922)
- Panagis Tsaldaris (1868–1936)
- Alexandros Papagos (1883–1955)
- Konstantinos Tsaldaris (1884–1970)
- Georgios Grivas (1897–1974)
- Georgios Rallis (1918–2006)
- Ilias Kasidiaris (1980–)

== Hungarian ==
- Albert Apponyi (1846–1933)
- József Mindszenty (1892–1975)
- Margit Slachta (1884–1974)

== Italian ==
- Thomas Aquinas (1225-1274)
- Dante Alighieri (c. 1265–1321)
- Robert Bellarmine (1542-1621)
- Pope Pius VI (1717-1799)
- Fabrizio Ruffo (1744-1827)
- Francesco Crispi (1818–1901)
- Pope Pius XII (1876–1958)

== Japanese ==
- Kitabatake Chikafusa (1293–1354)
- Yamazaki Ansai (1619–1682)
- Kamo no Mabuchi (1697–1769)
- Motoori Norinaga (1730–1801)
- Hirata Atsutane (1776–1843)
- Aizawa Seishisai (1782–1863)
- Yoshida Shōin (1830–1859)
- Hiraizumi Kiyoshi (1895–1984)
- Yukio Mishima (1925–1970)
- Otoya Yamaguchi (1943–1960)
- Yoshiko Sakurai (born 1945)
- Shinzo Abe (1954-2022)

== Jamaican ==
- Alexander Bustamante (1884–1977)
- Sir Howard Cooke (1915–2014)
- Norman Manley (1893–1969)

== Maltese ==
- George Borg Olivier (1911–1980)

== Mauritius ==
- Gaëtan Duval (1930–1996)
- Sir Seewoosagur Ramgoolam (1900–1985)

== Mexican ==
- Lucas Alamán (1792–1853)
- José Mariano Salas (1797–1867)
- Juan Almonte (1803–1869)
- Pelagio Antonio de Labastida y Dávalos (1816–1891)
- Tomás Mejía Camacho (1820–1867)
- Miguel Miramón (1832–1867)
- Leonardo Márquez (1820–1913)

== Polish ==
- Aleksy Ćwiakowski (1885–1953)
- Stanisław Mackiewicz (1896–1966)
- Michał Marusik (1951–2020)
- Janusz Korwin-Mikke (born 1942)
- Robert Iwaszkiewicz (born 1962)
- Radek Sikorski (born 1963)
- Grzegorz Braun (born 1967)

== Portuguese ==
- Ramalho Ortigão (1836–1915)
- Guilherme de Santa-Rita (1889–1918)
- António Sardinha (1887–1925)
- Sophia de Mello Breyner Andresen (1919–2004)
- Gonçalo Ribeiro Telles (1922–2020)
- Miguel Esteves Cardoso (born 1955)

== Russian ==
- Nikolai Gogol (1809-1852)
- Fyodor Dostoevsky (1821-1881)
- Nikolai Golitsyn (1850-1925)
- Alexander Dubrovin (1855-unknown)
- Fyodor Viktorovich Vinberg (1868–1927)
- Vladimir Purishkevich (1870–1920)
- Vladimir Zhirinovsky (1946–2022)
- Valentina Matviyenko (born 1949)
- Boris Nemtsov (1959–2015)
- Anton Bakov (born 1965)
- Natalia Poklonskaya (born 1980)
- Anna Kuznetsova (born 1982)
- Alter Rebbe (1745-1812)
- Sidney Reilly (1873-1925)
- Grigori Rasputin (1869-1916)
- Pyotr Tchaikovsky (1840-1893)

== Serbian ==
- Milan Nedić (1878–1946)
- Nikolaj Velimirović (1881–1956)
- Dimitrije Ljotić (1891–1945)
- Draža Mihajlović (1893–1946)
- Momčilo Đujić (1907–1999)
- Pavle, Serbian Patriarch (1914–2009)
- Irinej, Serbian Patriarch (1930–2020)
- Nebojša M. Krstić (1964–2001)

== South African ==
- De Villiers Graaff (1913–1999)
- Cecil Rhodes (1853–1902)
- Jan Smuts (1870–1950)

== Spanish ==
- Jaime Balmes (1810–1848)
- Antonio Cánovas del Castillo (1828–1897)
- Pedro Muñoz Seca (1879–1936)
- Salvador Dalí (1904–1989)
- Pablo Casado (born 1981)

== Turkish ==
- Besim Tibuk (born 1946)
- Celâl Şengör (born 1955)
- Kadir Mısıroğlu (1933–2019)

== Israeli ==
- Avraham Stern (1907-1942)
- Meir Ettinger (born 1991)
- Yitzchak Ginsburgh (born 1944)
