= Tranquilino =

Tranquilino is a masculine given name. Notable people with the name include:

- Tranquilino de Bonilla y Herdocia (1797–1864), Costa Rican politician
- Tranquilino Garcete (1907–?), Paraguayan footballer
- Tranquilino Luna (1849–1892), American politician
- Tranquilino Berrios (1918-2007), Puerto Rican procer
