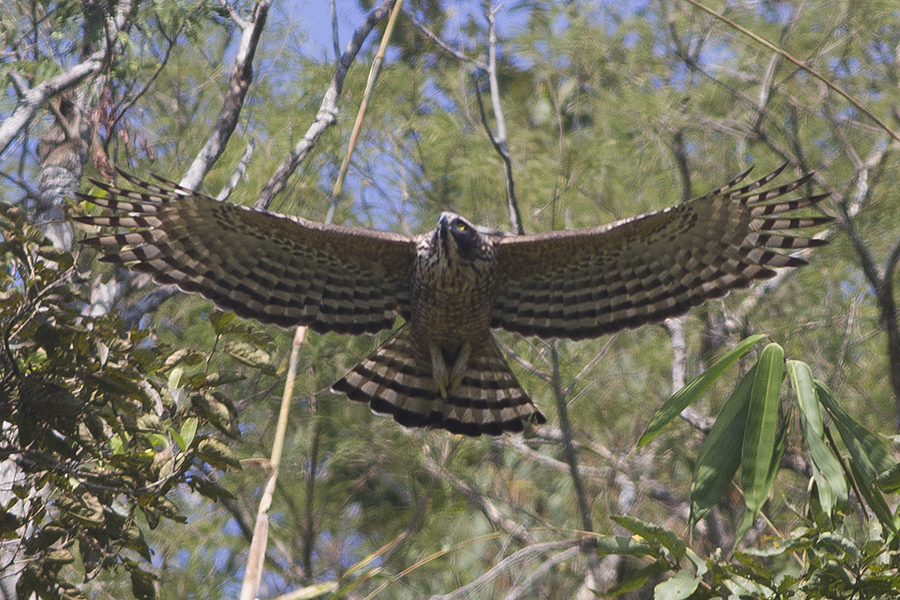
- An adult mountain hawk-eagle in flight, West Bengal, India

Conservation status
- Near Threatened (IUCN 3.1)

Scientific classification
- Kingdom: Animalia
- Phylum: Chordata
- Class: Aves
- Order: Accipitriformes
- Family: Accipitridae
- Genus: Nisaetus
- Species: N. nipalensis

Binomial name
- Nisaetus nipalensis Hodgson, 1836

Subspecies
- N. n. nipalensis - Hodgson, 1836; N. n. orientalis - (Temminck & Schlegel, 1845)

Synonyms
- Spizaetus nipalensis

= Mountain hawk-eagle =

Species of bird

The mountain hawk-eagle (Nisaetus nipalensis) or Hodgson's hawk-eagle, is a large bird of prey native to Asia. The latter name is in reference to the naturalist, Brian Houghton Hodgson, who described the species after collecting one himself in the Himalayas. A less widely recognized common English name is the feather-toed eagle. Like all eagles, it is in the family Accipitridae. Its feathered tarsus marks this species as a member of the subfamily Aquilinae. It is a confirmed breeding species in the northern part of the Indian subcontinent, from India, Nepal (hence the epithet nipalensis) through Bangladesh to Thailand, Taiwan, Vietnam and Japan, although its distribution could be wider still as breeding species. Like other Asian hawk-eagles, this species was earlier treated under the genera of Spizaetus but genetic studies have shown this group to be paraphyletic, resulting in the Old World members being placed in Nisaetus (Hodgson, 1836) and separated from the New World species. As is typical of hawk-eagles, the mountain hawk-eagle is a forest dwelling opportunistic predator who readily varies its prey selection between birds, mammals and reptiles along with other vertebrates. Although classified currently as a least-concern species due its persistence over a rather wide distribution, this species is often quite rare and scarce and seems to be decreasing, especially in response to large-scale habitat degradation and deforestation.

== Description ==
=== Size and taxonomy ===
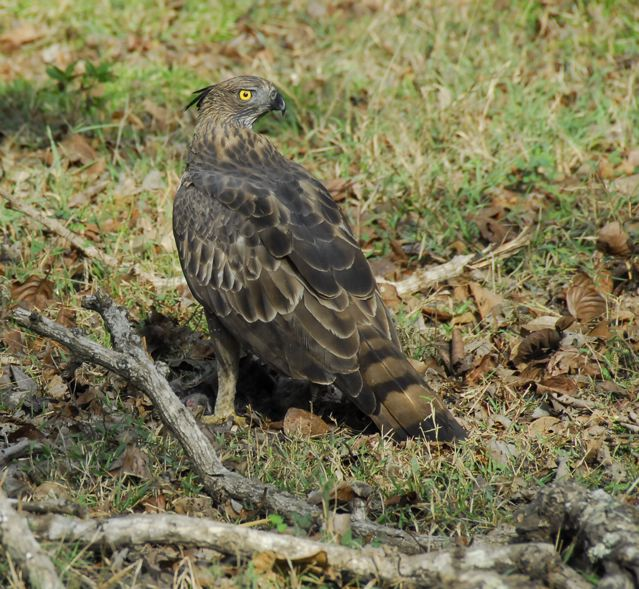
Mountain hawk-eagles are the largest and most robust of the hawk-eagles in the genus Nisaetus.

The mountain hawk-eagle is a large raptor and fairly large eagle. Although described not infrequently as "slim", it is usually perceptibly bulkier and more massive than most other members of its genus. It is seemingly the largest member of the 10 currently recognized species in the genus Nisaetus, notwithstanding the recently recognized Flores hawk-eagle (Nisaetus floris) (which was separated from the changeable hawk-eagle). The latter critically endangered island hawk-eagle seems to be of broadly similar size (weight is unknown), albeit with shorter wings, however the Flores species seems to be linearly outmatched by and slimmer in build the largest mountain hawk-eagle. The mountain hawk-eagle attains a total length of 69 to 84 cm (27 to 33 in) and a wingspan of 134 to 175 cm (4 ft 5 in to 5 ft 9 in). Like most birds of prey, females are larger on average than the male, with a typical size difference of 3-8%, though it can rarely range up to a 21% difference. Although its wings are relatively short compared to eagles of open country, it has the longest wings of any of the hawk-eagles, even relative to their size. Mountain hawk-eagles have a short but strong bill, long and often erect crest (though can also be very short), short wings, a longish three-banded tail, feathered legs and powerful feet. It is usually rather unobtrusive, perching rather upright inside of canopy, with its wing-tips coming to less than one-fifth down the tail. There are two currently recognized races of the mountain hawk-eagle: the nominate subspecies (N. n. nipalensis) and the subspecies native to Japan (N. n. orientalis). The nominate race is found throughout mainland range and includes the likely dubious southeast Chinese races of N. n. fokiensis and N. n. whiteheadi. The average total length of the nominate subspecies is estimated to be 72 cm (28 in). Among standard measurements in the nominate race, the wing chord of males ranges from 410 to 465 mm (16.1 to 18.3 in) while the female's ranges from 445 to 508 mm (17.5 to 20.0 in). In both sexes, the tail ranges from 279 to 314.3 mm (10.98 to 12.37 in) and the tarsus from 100 to 119.9 mm (3.94 to 4.72 in). 9 males of the nominate race were found to average 437.2 mm (17.21 in) in wing length, 281.3 mm (11.07 in) in tail length, 38.7 mm (1.52 in) in hallux claw length (the large rear talon often utilized by accipitrids as a killing tool), 110.3 mm (4.34 in) in tarsus length and 30.3 mm (1.19 in) in bill length. 13 females of the nominate were found to average 479.2 mm (18.87 in) in wing length, 297.9 mm (11.73 in) in tail length, 46 mm (1.8 in) in hallux claw length, 114.8 mm (4.52 in) in tarsus length and 33.9 mm (1.33 in) in bill length. One unsexed mountain hawk-eagle from northern India was found to weigh 1.83 kg (4.0 lb). A single male from the Yangtze area of east-central China was found to have weighed 2.8 kg (6.2 lb) while two females from there weighed 2.95 and 3.5 kg (6.5 and 7.7 lb), suggesting size increases further north in this subspecies in accordance with Bergmann's rule.

The Japanese race averages about 9% larger than mainland race, and also has a proportionately longer tail and longer wings. The populations from Taiwan and the possible ones in Hainan are also probably part of this race. N. n. orientalis is generally paler than the nominate race with less heavy markings below. The underside in this race has a paler ground colour against much browner and darker barring, often showing less of the warmer or rufous tones typical of mainland mountain hawk-eagles. The throat often has reduced blackish streaking compared to mainland birds and the upper chest can be whitish and nearly unmarked. N. n. orientalis has black mottled or light streaked wing-linings and a small, often vestigial crest compared to the rather ample one of the mainland birds. Sometimes, N. n. orientalis is hypothesized to be a separate species. Among standard measurements wing chord of males ranges from 470 to 518 mm (18.5 to 20.4 in) while the female's ranges from 500 to 540 mm (20 to 21 in). In both sexes, the tail ranges from 325 to 395 mm (12.8 to 15.6 in) and the tarsus from 104 to 128.9 mm (4.09 to 5.07 in). From a sample of unknown size from the Suzuka Mountains, males of N. n. orientalis were found to average 71.4 cm (28.1 in) and females 76.3 cm (30.0 in) in total length. From the same sample, males had a mean wing chord length of 488 mm (19.2 in), tail length of 342 mm (13.5 in), culmen length of 34 mm (1.3 in) and tarsus length of 113 mm (4.4 in). Meanwhile, females had a mean wing chord length of 516 mm (20.3 in), tail length of 356 mm (14.0 in), culmen length of 37 mm (1.5 in) and tarsus length of 118.2 mm (4.65 in). Perhaps most surprisingly, the Suzuka mountain birds were not noticeably discrepant in body mass from known weights of mainland mountain hawk-eagles, especially similar to that of the apparently larger hawk-eagles from east-central China. The Suzuka sample as above found males to weigh from 2.2 to 2.7 kg (4.9 to 6.0 lb), with an average of 2.3 kg (5.1 lb), while females were found to weigh from 2.5 to 3.9 kg (5.5 to 8.6 lb), with an average of 3.1 kg (6.8 lb). Another Japanese survey found the smallest male to weigh 1.68 kg (3.7 lb), the lightest known weight known anywhere for the species.

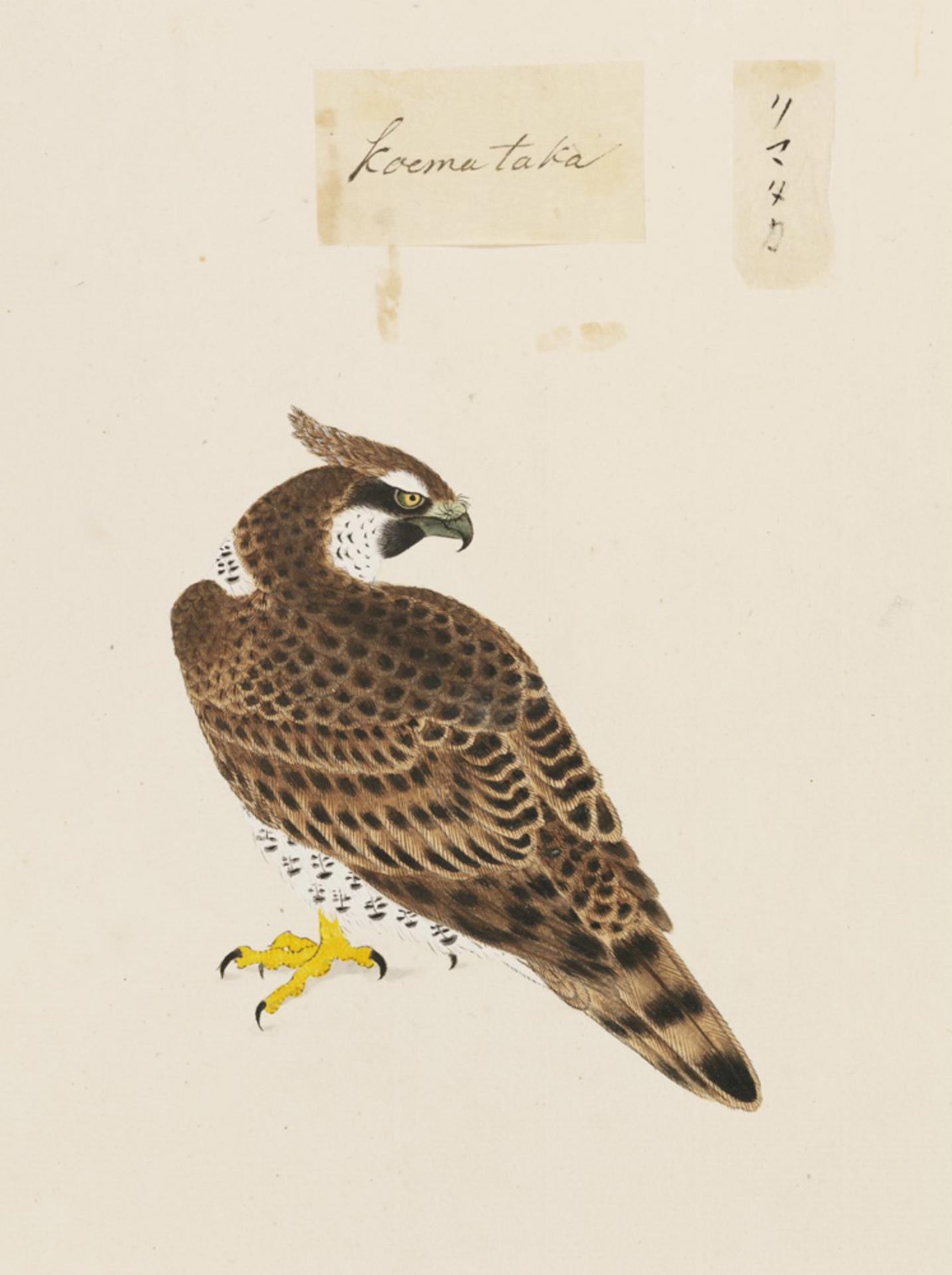
Drawing of the Japanese race by Yūshi Ishizaki, from the 1830s.

At one time largish hawk-eagles found in Sri Lanka and southwestern India was deemed to be part of the mountain hawk-eagle species under the subspecies N. n. kelaarti. A 2008 study based on the geographic isolation and differences in call suggest that this be treated as a full species, Nisaetus kelaarti, Legge's hawk-eagle. The full species status of Legge's hawk-eagle appears to be further supported by DNA studies, with an average difference in mitochondrial DNA of 4.3% (usually the minimum difference to differentiate species is considered to be 1.5%). Although extremely isolated in distribution from true mountain hawk-eagles, Legge's hawk-eagle is physically distinct as well, often being much paler and less marked below with the throat stripes characteristics of the mountain species often absent (occasionally faint stripes may manifest) being instead largely plain buff about the throat. Like mainland mountain hawk-eagles, Legge's hawk-eagles have a strong crest. The hand in flight on a Legge's is often plain buff in colour (or with some very faint streaking) and the banded wing feathers are rather faded. Legge's hawk-eagle appears to be about 10% smaller than mountain hawk-eagles and was found to differ in almost all bodily proportions from mountain hawk-eagle, with relatively smaller wings but the smaller species also has a larger bill and larger talons than the mountain hawk-eagle.

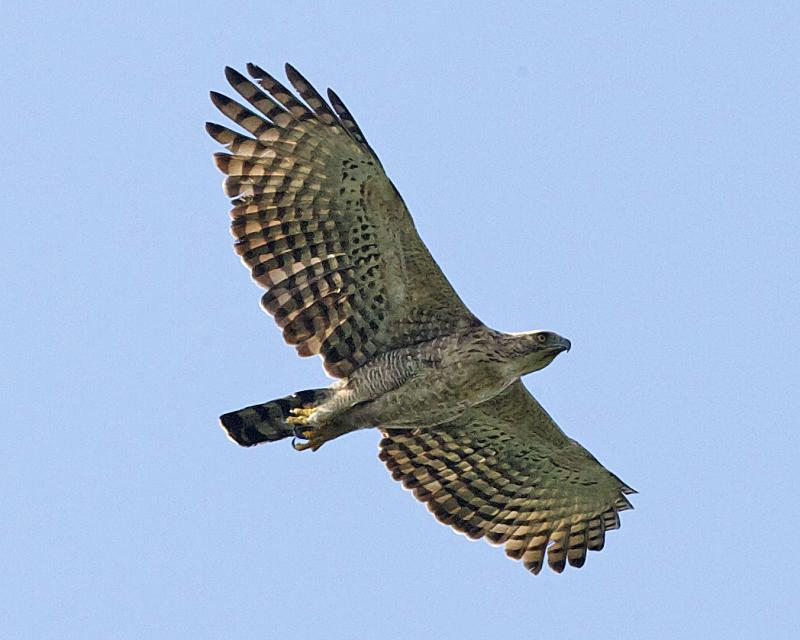
A subadult mountain hawk-eagle in flight in Singapore.

=== Colouring and confusion species ===
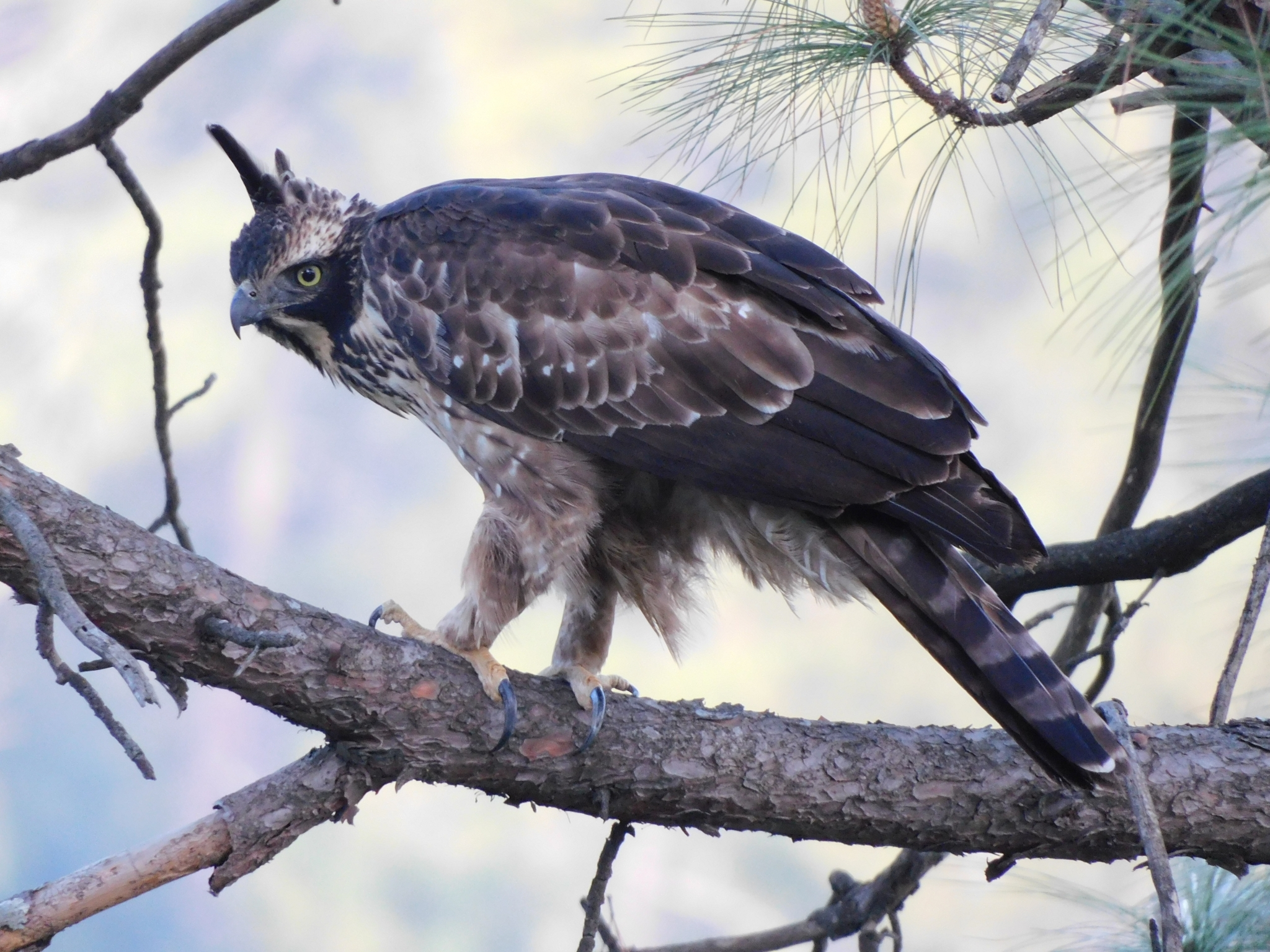
A mountain hawk-eagle adult.

Adult mountain hawk-eagles are dark brown above with slightly paler edges, which tend to be clearest on median and greater coverts. On adults, the head is fairly rusty above with strong black streaks, though the volume of streaks tends to decrease on the neck, which in turn may suggest a rufous collar. The crest is largely black with a small buffy tip. Their tail is grey-brown, with a whitish tip and rather obscure blackish banding above. The malar area and throat are marked with blackish, ragged and sparse but rather bold stripes which contrast with the rest of their underside which is predominantly barred with rufous over a whitish ground colour. The barring continues, though the white base colour narrows and the rufous becomes a somewhat browner hue, down to the crissum and the legs. In some cases, the colour about the legs has appeared variously chestnut or even blackish. The underside of the tail is boldly banded with blackish and grey. The juvenile mountain hawk-eagle is also dark brown above but usually has clear cream to whitish feather edges causing the wing coverts to have a scaled effect; meanwhile, the feather bases of median and greater coverts form tawnier mid-wing patches. The juvenile's tail is thinly banded alternately with lighter and darker brown but usually have a whitish tip like the tail of the adult. The juvenile mountain hawk-eagle's underside is all plain buffy to tawny. The underside colour also extends to the head and part of the neck flanks while the crown, cheek, nape and hind-neck all streaked with dark brown. The crest is black with a small white tip. The juvenile leg feathers are whitish. The markings on the underside begin to develop by the 2nd year, starting from the flanks and gradually increasing inward to the breast, but the young hawk-eagles are still quite paler below until their 3rd year, which is also when the tail starts to resemble the adults. Full adult plumage is attained at no later than the 4th year. Adults have golden or even yellowish-orange eyes, with juveniles having pale bluish-grey to pale yellow eyes. In the adult the cere is blackish-grey, while in juveniles it is dull-grey. In all ages, the feet range from dull yellow to yellowish white. In flight, it is notable for its rather prominent head and relatively short rounded wings, an effect emphasized by their broad hands and bulging secondaries, which tend to pinch in at the rear bases. The mountain hawk-eagle is capable of fast, agile flight "with astonishing maneuverability". They usually glide with powerful, shallow beats interspersed with glides on level wings, but soaring birds hold their wings in a shallow V, pressed slightly forward. The wing linings of adults are a rusty similar to flank coloring, becoming paler on forepart and marked with dusky mottling which becomes darker mid-wing. Blackish-brown bars are apparent over greyish ground colour on the secondaries, the feathers here relatively broadly barred with blackish while the primaries are whiter based and darker tipped. Flying juveniles are fairly heavily mottled with white above. Juveniles show more buff to tawny colour below extending to their wing linings while the wing-tips are black, in some cases extending to primary coverts form a vague carpal arc. Juvenile flight feathers are whitish grey with thin and rather faded looking dusky barring, with less white showing at the base of the primaries. Juveniles in flight usually evidence a less distinct subterminal band than do adults.

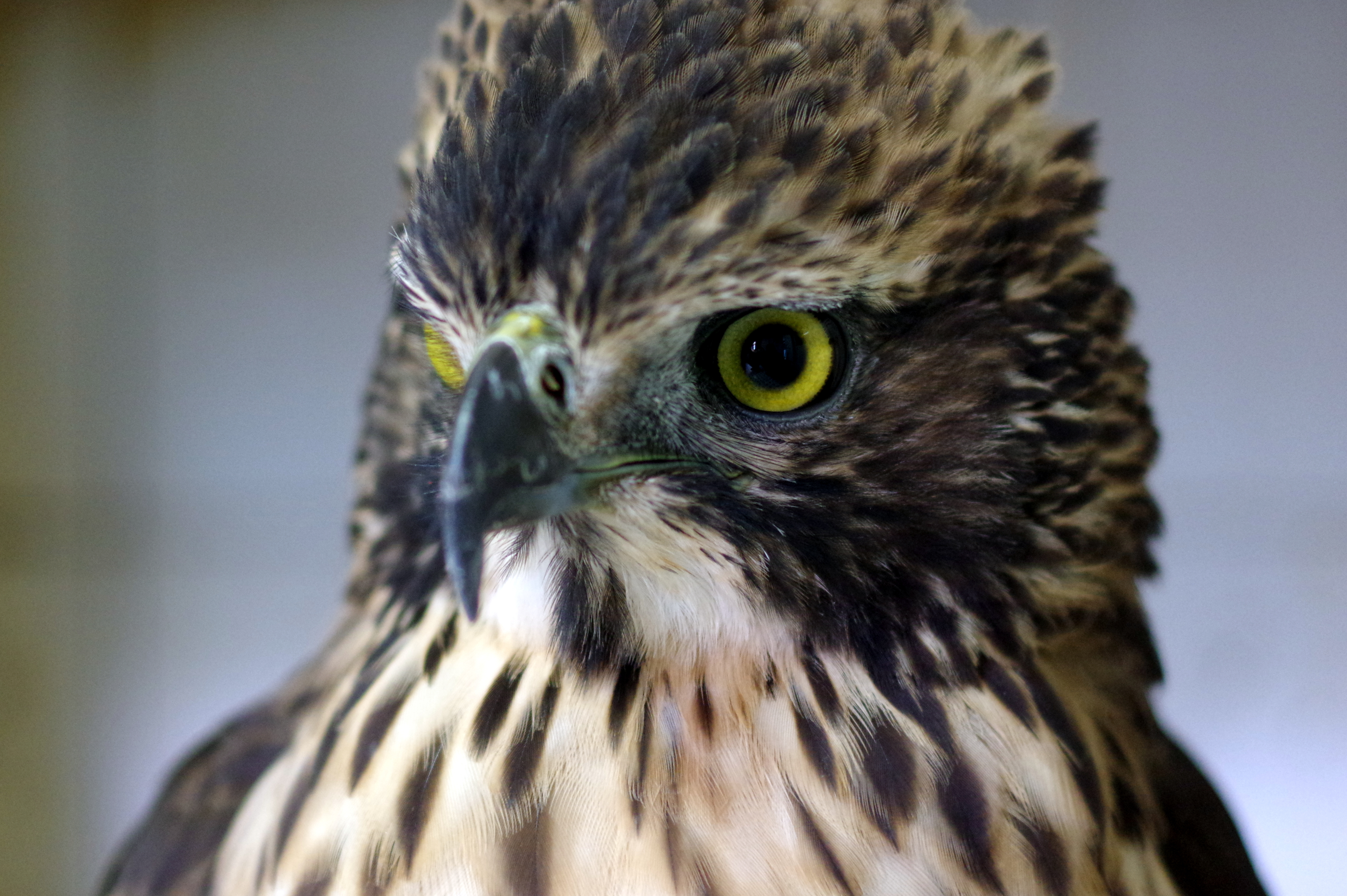
Close-up of a mountain hawk-eagle from China.

Confusion of mountain hawk-eagle in all plumages is possible with pale morph changeable hawk-eagles (Nisaetus cirrhatus). However, the latter species only has a vestigal crest in most areas of overlap from northern India to southeast Asia. Furthermore, the changeable is a slighter, more slender bird with a relatively longer tail. The latter species also has narrower wings with more even trailing edges. While soaring, changeable hawk-eagles tend to have flatter wing shape than mountain hawk-eagles. Changeable adults also have streaking rather than heavy rusty barring on their underside, apart from subtle parts of wing linings and flanks, and also have narrower tail bars. In flight, the changeable also has clear white base to their primaries and less whitish on the rump when seen from above. Juveniles of the two species are more easily mistaken but wing proportions always differ, the mountain juveniles usually appear perceptibly bulkier and changeable juveniles (of relevant races) are generally much paler, rather than warm buffy to tawny, on the head and underparts. The mountain hawk-eagle also overlaps somewhat in range, in southeast Asia, with Blyth's hawk-eagle (Nisaetus alboniger) and Wallace's hawk-eagles (Nisaetus nanus) but both are much smaller and different in multiple ways (especially the bold black-and-white of adult Blyth's). Another, albeit unlikely, potential source of confusion for the mountain hawk-eagle is with Jerdon's baza (Aviceda jerdoni), which is far smaller, and of a far more compact and chunky build. The baza is somewhat similar in marking to adult mountain hawk-eagles, but the baza lacks feathered legs and has relatively much longer and differently shaped wings. Mountain hawk-eagles can usually be told from the slighter, smaller crested honey buzzard (Pernis ptilorhynchus), beyond the latter being polymorphic, as even most similarly plumaged individual honey buzzards have bare legs, much smaller and slimmer head and bill with a longer neck and deeper wing beats on relatively longer, more slender wings.

=== Vocalisation ===
Mountain hawk-eagles are silent apart from their breeding season. Their call is a shrill treble note, with a quality often compared to a penny whistle. Their typical call is often likened to the klu-weet-weet of a green sandpiper (Tringa ochropus) or the kee-kikik of the common green magpie (Cissa chinensis). Sometimes the call is written in Japan as pie-pie-pie or pipipi. The hawk-eagles, including both members of a breeding pair, may call both in flight and while perched. Another call of a rapid bubbling quality, which is considered comparable to that of the little grebe (Tachybaptus ruficollis), is probably produced only during sky-dances. A study in Taiwan diagnosed seven call types consisting of different quality trills in Taiwan during the breeding cycle, including different calls emitted during flight or while perched and food-begging or alarm calls by nestlings. The calls of mountain hawk-eagles are said to be expertly mimicked by drongos in some parts of the range.

== Distribution and habitat ==
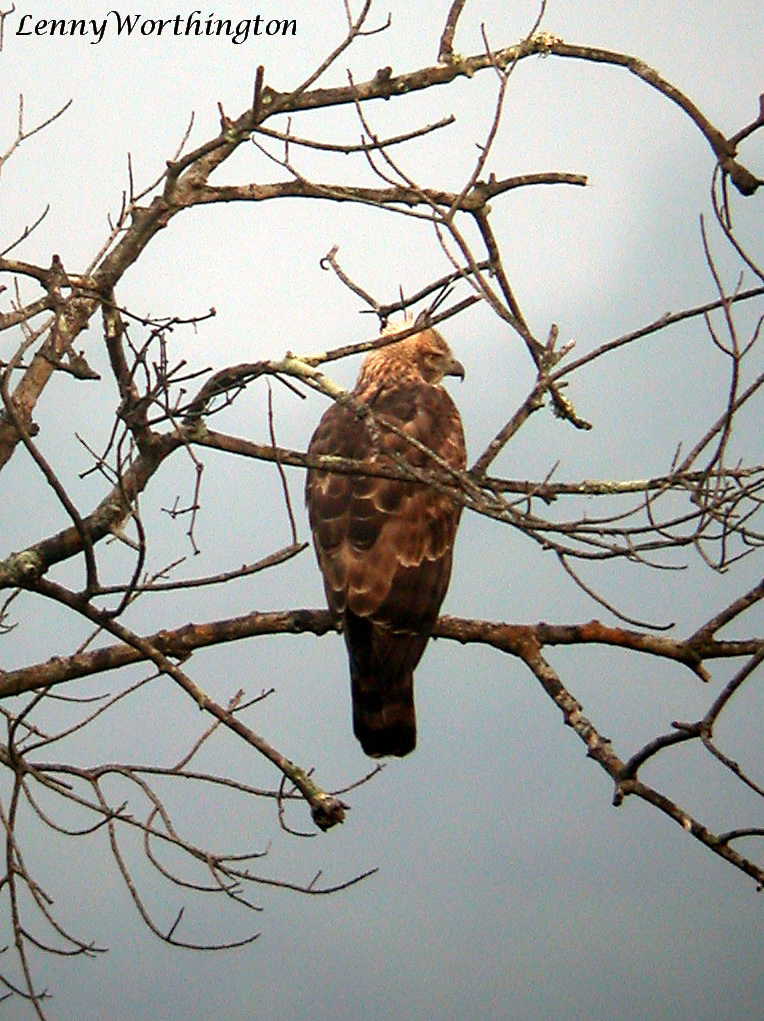
Mountain hawk-eagles often live in cooler, more temperate habitats including deciduous forest than other hawk-eagles.

Both the northern and southern limits of this widely found raptor are surprisingly poorly known to this day, with historic records suggesting that the species may take up residence hundreds of kilometers north of its accepted range and year-around reports of this species from areas formerly considered only to be visited by wintering migrant or vagrant hawk-eagles. The mountain hawk-eagle is distributed through the Himalayas, extending from northeastern Pakistan through north India in at least the states of central Jammu and Kashmir, Himachal Pradesh and Uttarakhand, continuing into Nepal, Bhutan to northern Assam thence southward into the north and east Burmese highlands, west and peninsular Thailand, also the northern parts of Laos and probably Vietnam. Their range continues eastward into southeastern China where they may be found in Yunnan, Guangxi and Guangdong Province northward in the east to the lower reaches of the Yangtze in Anhui and Zhejiang. Their range also extends to Hainan, an offshore island of China. Mountain hawk-eagles are additionally found in the island nations of Taiwan and Japan, with the highest concentration known on northern islands such Hokkaido but they may be found on nearly all the islands of Japan. The mountain hawk-eagle has been recorded under the status of "rare breeder" in areas much farther north than is conventionally accepted as part of their range, such as far eastern Mongolia and the landlocked, extreme southern part of the Russian Far East such as in Primorsky Krai. To this date, the IUCN has not updated the range maps for mountain hawk-eagles to reflect the species' presence in these areas, although their status as continual breeders here may still need confirmation. Through much of their range, mountain hawk-eagles are typically sedentary but both adults and young hawk-eagles sometimes also disperse in descent from higher grounds in winter and it may be characterized as a partial migrant. There are several recorded cases of the species wandering in north India down into Indo-Gangetic plains. In Bhutan, fragmentary information suggest short-distance altitudinal movements are not infrequent. Relatively low volumes of migrant mountain hawk-eagles were detected in Nepal, however. With a fair amount of consistency, the hawk-eagles found in the northern part of southeast Asia range into more lowland areas of Burma, eastern Thailand and peninsular Malaysia. There are also similar movements to lowlands in Japan with some Japanese ones moving to the Korean Peninsula. In some of the areas above such as Thailand and Malaysia (mainly far northern part of country), year-around reports of mountain hawk-eagles may suggest small, isolated pockets of residency and/or breeding occurring. Mountain hawk-eagles have been recorded as a vagrant in Hong Kong and Cambodia. Broader vagrancy has been reported in the case of a mountain hawk-eagle that turned up in the island of Borneo.

The mountain hawk-eagle tends to reside in dense hill and montane forests at any point up to the tree line. They are mainly found in various wooded foothills. Typically, primary evergreen or mixed forests are preferred, with the presence of nearby streams a plus. The central part of the range falls in subtropical broadleaf forest made cooler by their high elevations but they can range anywhere from temperate mixed forests to tropical rainforests. However, in some areas the species can range into second growth. In non-breeding times, mountain hawk-eagles may sometimes wander through wooded plains and briefly near fairly developed villages (though usually more secluded and primitive one) and even cities. In Japan, they reportedly entirely avoid woods near urban areas. Elevations the species has been known to live at in the Himalayas are mostly 600 to 2,800 m (2,000 to 9,200 ft) above sea-level. However, they've been recorded at elevations of up to 4,000 m (13,000 ft) in northern Yunnan. In Japan, they usually reside somewhat lower than in their mainland haunts, typical at between 250 and 1,500 m (820 and 4,920 ft). Mostly only during winter, the species has been recorded (albeit seldom) down to 200 m (660 ft) or even lower as vagrant.

== Behaviour and ecology ==
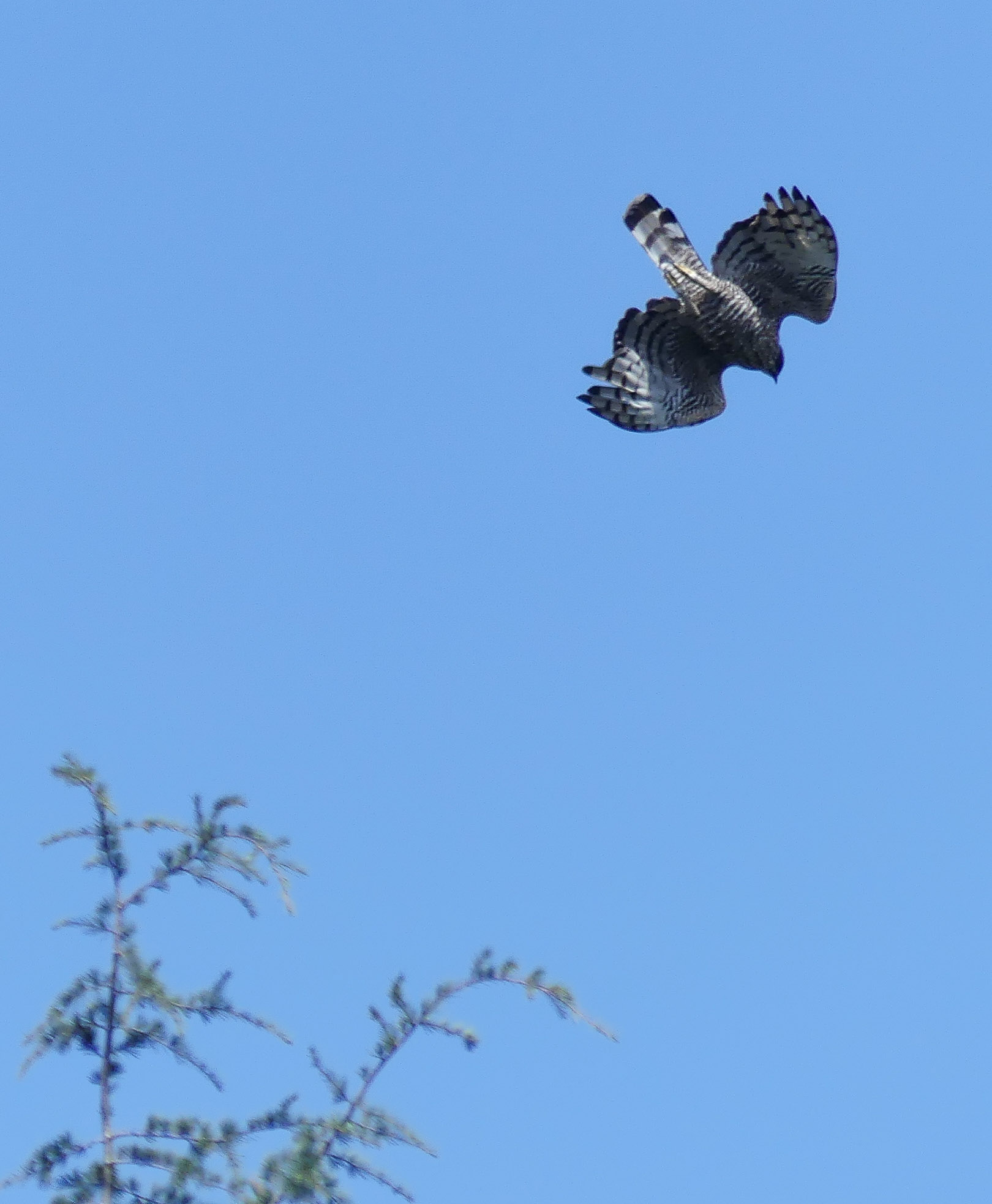
A mountain hawk-eagle stooping down among the trees in Uttarakhand.

Mountain hawk-eagles are well adapted to living in forests. As is the case for all Nisaetus species, their physical form and flight style is typical of forest-dwelling raptors in general and is often found to be roughly comparable to the features of true hawks or Accipiters in particular larger species such as the occasionally sympatric Eurasian Goshawk (Accipiter Gentilis). Like most other forest raptors, mountain hawk-eagles (and Nisaetus species in general) have a long tail, short broad wings and relatively long but powerful legs, all of which impart greater maneuverability and quicker strike times in denser wooded hunting grounds than other raptorial body plans. The common name hawk-eagle is apparently in reference to their similar adaptations to true hawks. Contrary to the suggestion that, based on their physiology, especially their longer wings and tarsus but shorter talon and bill length, when physically compared to the Legge's hawk-eagle implies that the mountain hawk-eagle is morphologically adapted to hunting birds more so than mammals, dietary studies indicate that the mountain hawk-eagle is not necessarily a specialized bird predator but rather a generalist and opportunist like many predators. In fact the small handful of dietary studies of the species show that the mountain hawk-eagle somewhat prefer small mammals as prey but readily takes both birds and reptiles given the opportunity. Typically, the mountain hawk-eagle tends to still-hunt from a concealed perch in foliage, stooping down to take prey. Most prey is taken on the ground. Mountain hawk-eagles have also been observed catching passerines on the wing by giving chase from an ambush or when the prey is flushed by flying low at the canopy level. They will also readily take arboreal mammals and birds from a perch or roost if they're able to fly upon them in an ambush. While most of their prey are relatively small, well within typical prey size range for most raptorial birds, mountain hawk-eagles can take remarkably large prey. Therefore, Brown & Amadon (1986) consider the species as markedly "rapacious and powerful".

One study that reviewed 118 prey items in several nests from southern Taiwan, revealed a surprising preferred prey type for mountain hawk-eagles, giant flying squirrels. The Indian giant flying squirrel (Petaurista philippensis) and the red and white giant flying squirrel (Petaurista alborufus), both weighing about 1.65 kg (3.6 lb) on average, accounted for 47.4% of the food items in Taiwan. How they capture these elusive and nocturnal rodents is not clear, but perhaps the flying squirrels' relatively huge size makes them more conspicuous from the hawk-eagle's lofty perch. A rather smaller true squirrel, the approximately 277 g (9.8 oz) Pallas's squirrel (Callosciurus erythraeus), made up a further 19.5% of the mean diet here. In total, 78.3% of prey taken in the southern Taiwan study was mammalian. However, the fourth most often taken prey species here was the 1.1 to 1.6 kg (2.4 to 3.5 lb) Swinhoe's pheasant (Lophura swinhoii), constituting on average 6.7% of the prey. A study in the Hyōgo Prefecture of Japan reviewed 142 prey items of a single breeding pair. Quantitatively, most prey deliveries by this pair were rather (almost surprisingly) small in body size, whether this is typical of Japanese hawk-eagles is not clear given the lack of comprehensive study. About 17.5% of the nest prey deliveries were unidentified small birds, of an estimated mass of 17.5 g (0.62 oz) (mostly brought by the male), while 7.7% of prey deliveries were unidentified medium-sized birds, of an estimated mass of 175 g (6.2 oz). These were followed by the merely 20 g (0.71 oz) Japanese shrew mole (Urotrichus talpoides) which constituted 7% of prey deliveries (again largely by male) . The most often delivered prey (18.2% of her 44 deliveries) by the female once she resumed hunting were larger class Elaphe snakes, in excess of 100 cm (39 in) length and 325 g (11.5 oz). Overall, the estimated size of nest prey deliveries here ranged from a 5 g (0.18 oz) Japanese grass lizard (Takydromus tachydromoides) to several Japanese hares (Lepus brachyurus) weighing an estimated mean of 1.9 kg (4.2 lb), the latter presumably constituting a majority of the prey biomass. In another study, the mean size of Japanese hares caught was apparently estimated as somewhat larger at about 2.5 kg (5.5 lb). In Jim Corbett National Park, India, prey reportedly consisted largely of smallish or medium-sized birds (albeit probably larger than those in the above Japanese study) such as mynas, doves, parakeets, nightjars, owls and village poultry. In the Russian Far East, apparently the most important prey types were reported as Manchurian hares (Lepus mandshuricus), a close cousin and of the same size as the Japanese hare, and hazel grouse (Tetrastes bonasia), while most of the remainder of the diet consisted of a mixture of smallish mammals like (moles, hedgehogs and flying squirrels) and largish forest birds (woodpeckers, pheasants and owls). Quantitatively rare prey items that have been recorded have including amphibians and, recorded only once, fish.

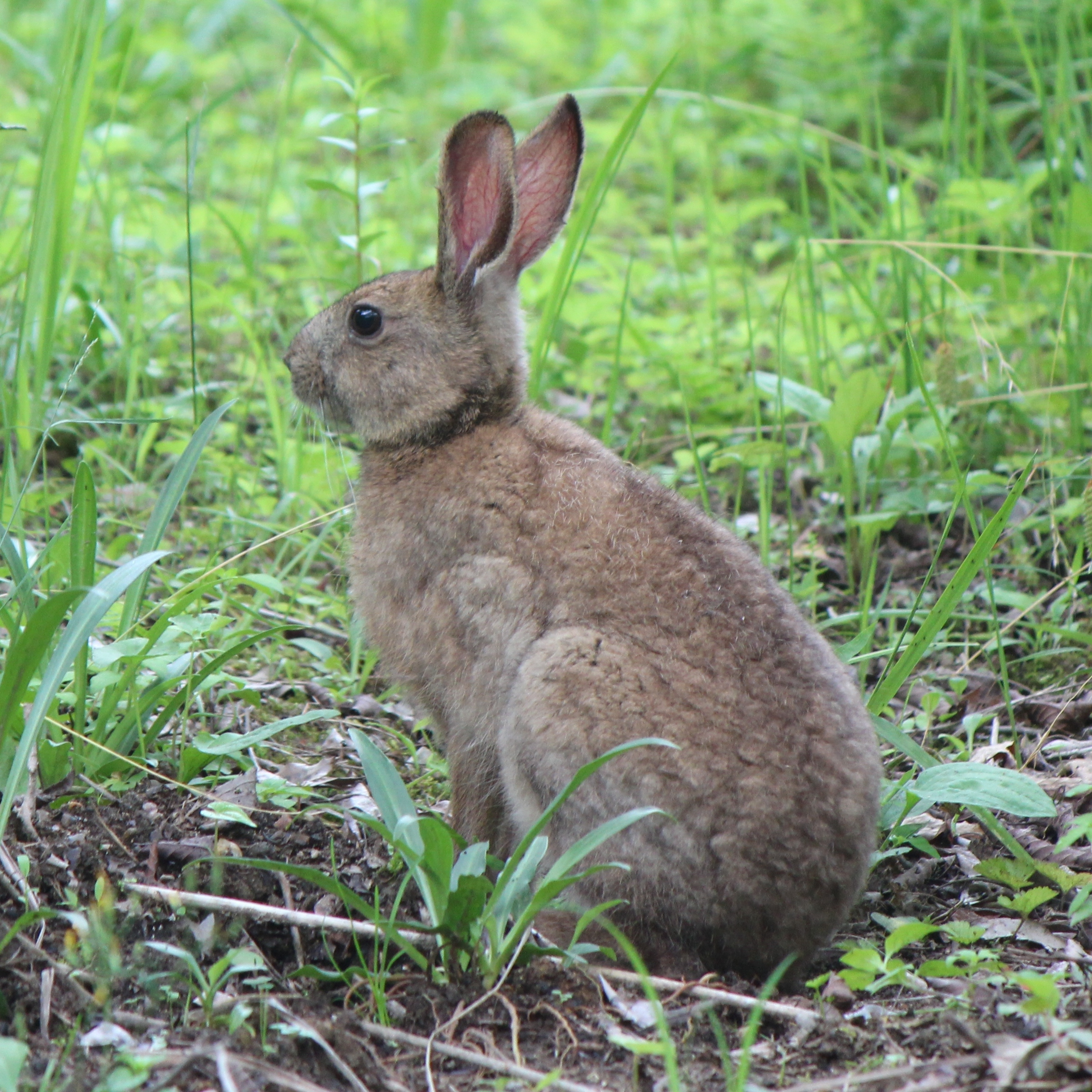
Small to medium-sized mammals such as the Japanese hare seem to form the bulk of the mountain hawk-eagle's diet.

While most of the prey mentioned above is of relatively modest size, the mountain hawk-eagle is not infrequently reported to attack prey of quite large sizes, including prey equal to their own size or larger. Mountain hawk-eagles have been reported to attack young ungulates but often relatively very young and small ones, probably close to a neonatal state. In Taiwan, they took the young of Formosan serow (Capricornis swinhoei) that were estimated to weigh on average under 2 kg (4.4 lb). Of similar size, in Japan, they took young piglets of the wild boar (Sus scrofa), averaging about 1.75 kg (3.9 lb). Reportedly, newborn sika deer (Cervus nippon), weighing at least 4.5 kg (9.9 lb), have been preyed upon in Japan as well. Scavenging of sika deer killed by human hunters has also been reported. Larger avian prey has been taken by mountain hawk-eagles, including adult Indian peafowl (Pavo cristatus) weighing up to an estimated 4 kg (8.8 lb). In Echizen-Kaga Kaigan Quasi-National Park, Japan, mountain hawk-eagles have been recorded attacking exclusively relatively large water birds on several occasions namely: the 1.12 kg (2.5 lb) mallard (Anas platyrhynchos), the 1.45 kg (3.2 lb) grey heron (Ardea cinerea), the 2.53 kg (5.6 lb) greater white-fronted goose (Anser albifrons) and the 2.77 kg (6.1 lb) bean goose (Anser fabalis).

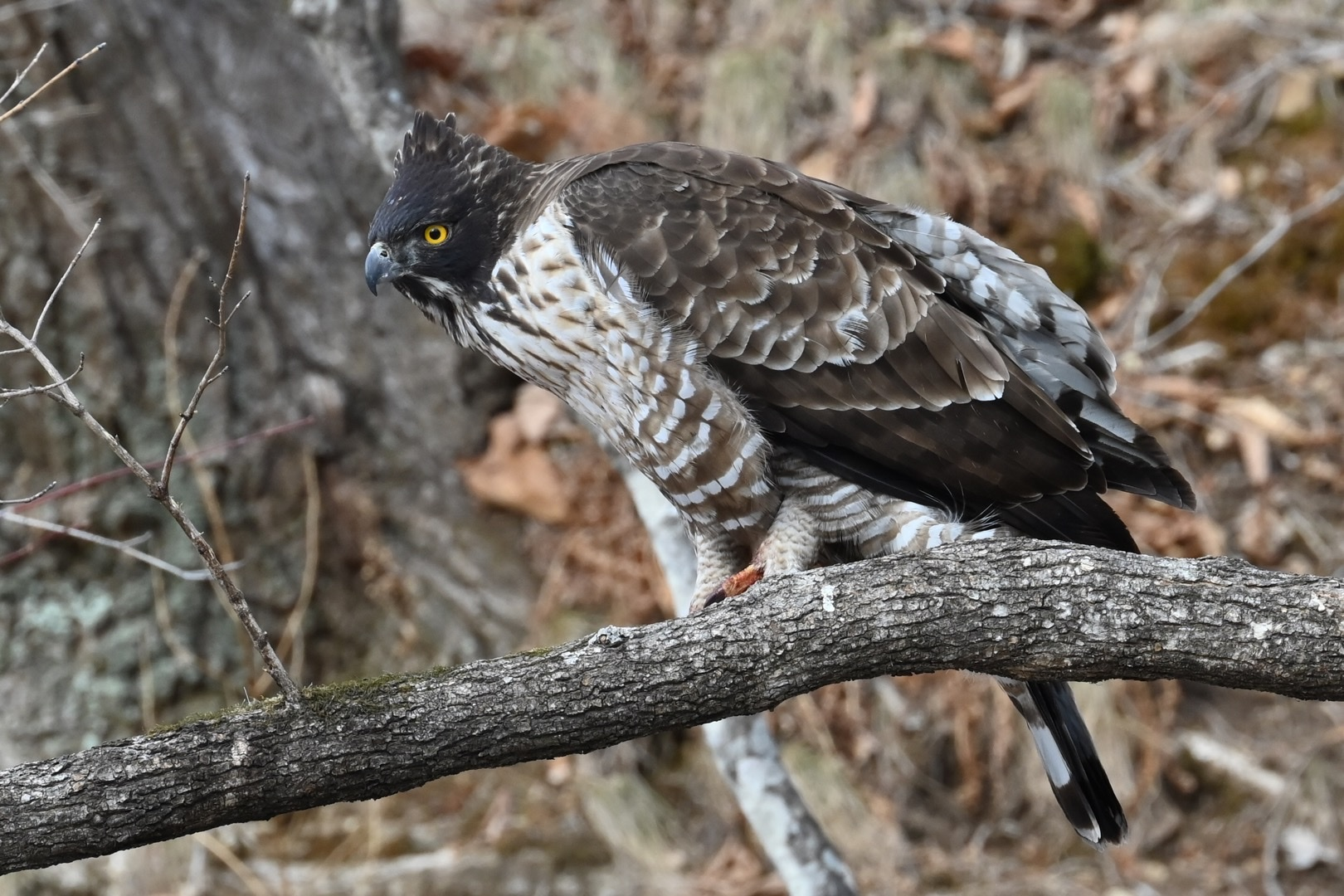
A mountain hawk-eagle in the little-known (and cartographically undescribed) population in Primorsky Krai in Russia.

Carnivorans taken by mountain hawk-eagles can also be relatively large as well as potentially dangerous. An estimated 1.8 kg (4.0 lb) kit of a Japanese badger (Meles anakuma) was preyed upon by a female. Meanwhile, four adult Chinese ferret-badgers (Melogale moschata), weighing on average about 1.3 kg (2.9 lb), were taken in Taiwan, while a Japanese marten (Martes melampus) of the same estimated weight was taken there by a female hawk-eagle. Sable (Martes zibellina) are also likely at threat from these birds. More impressive carnivoran prey dispatched by this species included an adult yellow-throated marten (Martes flavigula) weighing an estimated 2.75 kg (6.1 lb), an adult red panda (Ailurus fulgens) weighing an estimated 4.5 kg (9.9 lb) and reportedly adult raccoon dogs (Nyctereutes procyonoides), which weigh an average of 6.5 kg (14 lb), not to mention (in a similar size range) an occasional domestic cat (Felis silvestris catus) taken by this species. Of a similarly impressive nature in size and defensive temperament are primates, of which the mountain hawk-eagle is an occasional predator. However, a rather large portion of primate prey, such as monkeys, are taken as infants or juveniles, and most but not all adults killed by them are perhaps are likely to be previously injured or sickly. Taking even infant monkeys can be provide some risk for hunting hawk-eagles due to the protective nature of mothers as well as the overall monkey troops. For example, Formosan rock macaques (Macaca cyclopis) recorded to be taken in Taiwan were infants, weighing only an estimated 500 to 700 g (1.1 to 1.5 lb). An Assam macaque (Macaca assamensis) juvenile taken by a mountain hawk-eagle weighed an estimated 2 kg (4.4 lb). Cases of possible predation have also involved rhesus macaques (Macaca mulatta) in the Indian subcontinent. The mountain hawk-eagle is also considered a potential or confirmed threat to some larger primates (though largely or entirely younger, more vulnerable members of their troops) including: the François' langur (Trachypithecus francoisi), the black snub-nosed monkey (Rhinopithecus bieti), the lar gibbon (Hylobates lar) and the eastern hoolock gibbon (Hoolock leuconedys). However, the most impressive primate kill was an adult Japanese macaque (Macaca fuscata), estimated to weigh somewhere between 8.3 and 10 kg (18 and 22 lb), that was taken alive and subsequently dismantled by a large (presumed female) mountain hawk-eagle.

=== Interspecies predatory relationships ===
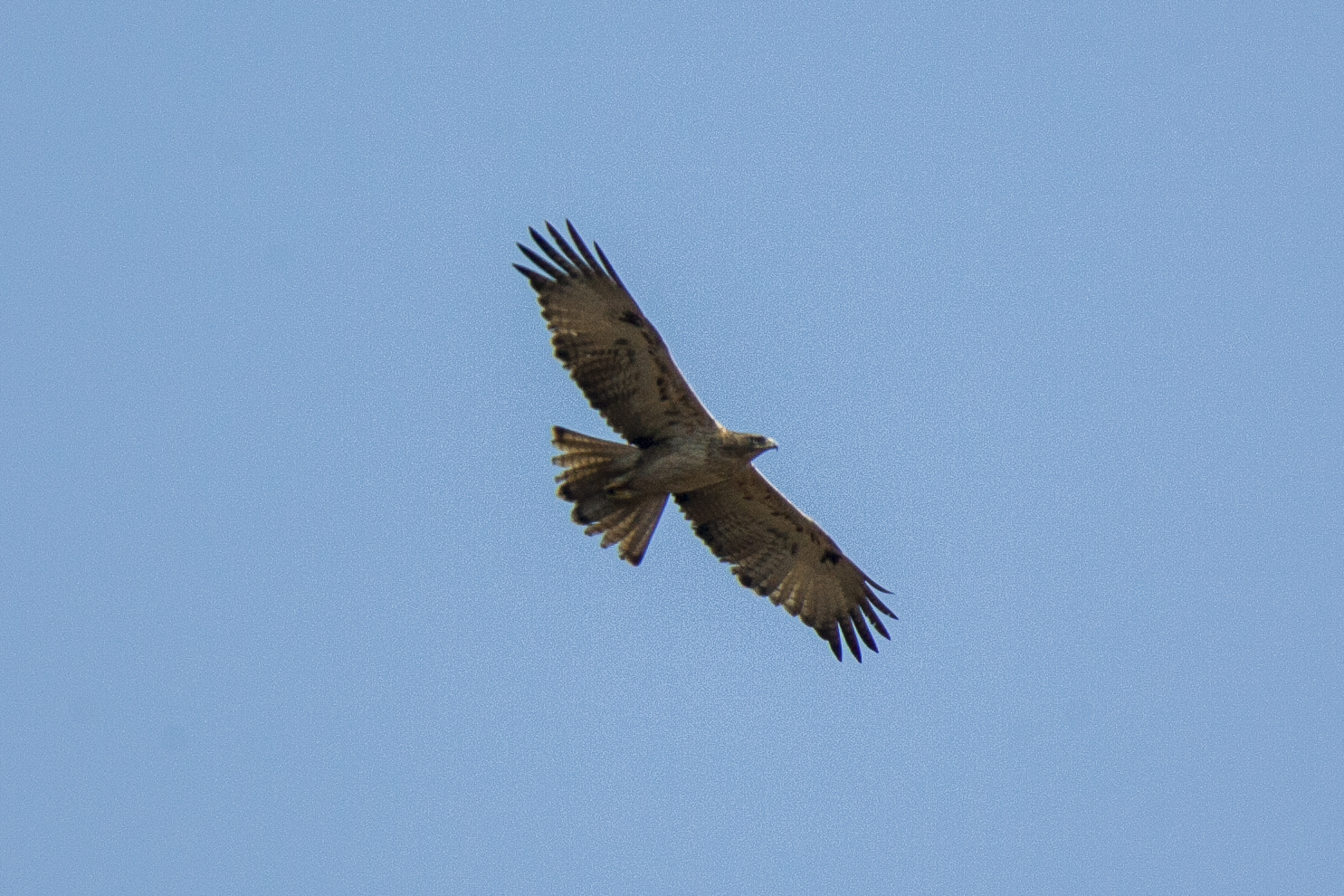
A mountain hawk-eagle in flight.

The mountain hawk-eagle overlaps in distribution with several other eagles, including about three species of Aquila and three species of Haliaeetus that are broadly similar in size to them as well as one slightly (in Japan) to notably (mainland) larger Aquila, the golden eagle (Aquila chrysaetos), and two much larger Haliaeetus species. However, the mountain hawk-eagle is the largest eagle in its range to live mostly within the confines of forest habitats, thus habitat differences against other larger eagles would normally provide ample partitioning and lessen competition. Some writers have claimed in life history and dietary habits that the mountain hawk-eagle warrants comparison to the top African forest eagle, crowned eagle (Stephanoaetus coronatus). While the mountain hawk-eagle and crowned eagle do show similarities in their territorial display and primary hunting techniques, beyond being larger with proportionately larger feet and talons, the latter is significantly more prone to taking primates and to taking extremely large prey (both relative to itself and compared to other eagles). In some of its range, the mountain hawk-eagle overlaps and shares forests with three other Nisaetus species and, often, with various species of Accipiter, the latter of which lead a comparable lifestyle but are far smaller and more agile. However, usually these other forest raptors can co-exist with the larger raptor by focusing on more generalized and usually smaller prey, largely birds but also reptiles and amphibians, than the mammals seemingly preferred by the mountain hawk-eagle. Larger owls sometimes also occur in the mountain hawk-eagles range and are a potential source of competition (excluding the fish owls, which are more restricted by diet) despite the temporal partitioning implied in their nocturnal habits. Although the Eurasian eagle-owl (Bubo bubo) usually prefers more open and rockier environments, the little-known spot-bellied eagle owl (Bubo nipalensis) has a very similar central distribution and habitat preferences as the mountain hawk-eagle, and despite being slightly smaller, it goes after exceptionally large prey with perhaps even more aplomb.

In Japan, mountain hawk-eagles are regarded as the fourth largest eagle after the Steller's sea eagle (Haliaeetus pelagicus), the white-tailed eagle (Haliaeetus albicilla) and the golden eagle. Despite the golden eagle race in Japan (A. c. japonica) being much smaller than other races and the larger size of Japanese mountain hawk-eagles, the golden eagle here still has a slight size advantage (about 7% larger) and much larger wings which gives them an advantage at fighting and hunting in open air but less maneuverability. While the golden is more a bird of open and rocky environments, the two species prey selection overlaps here (probably more so than mainland populations of the two species), with both taking Japanese hares supplemented by pheasants whenever possible, and this can cause a level of direct competition despite their different preferred habitats. In at least one case, a golden eagle attacked and may have preyed upon a mountain hawk-eagle. On the other hand, a mountain hawk-eagle may have preyed on the young of the black eagle (Ictinaetus malaiensis) in Taiwan. The mountain hawk-eagle is an occasional predator of a wide diversity of owls. Owl prey known to have been taken has included Asian barred owlet (Glaucidium cuculoides), jungle owlet (Glaucidium radiatum), brown boobook (Ninox scutulata), Eastern barn owl (Tyto javanica), Ural owl (Strix uralensis) and, once reportedly, even a Eurasian eagle-owl, a species of similar size and power to the hawk-eagle itself.

== Breeding ==
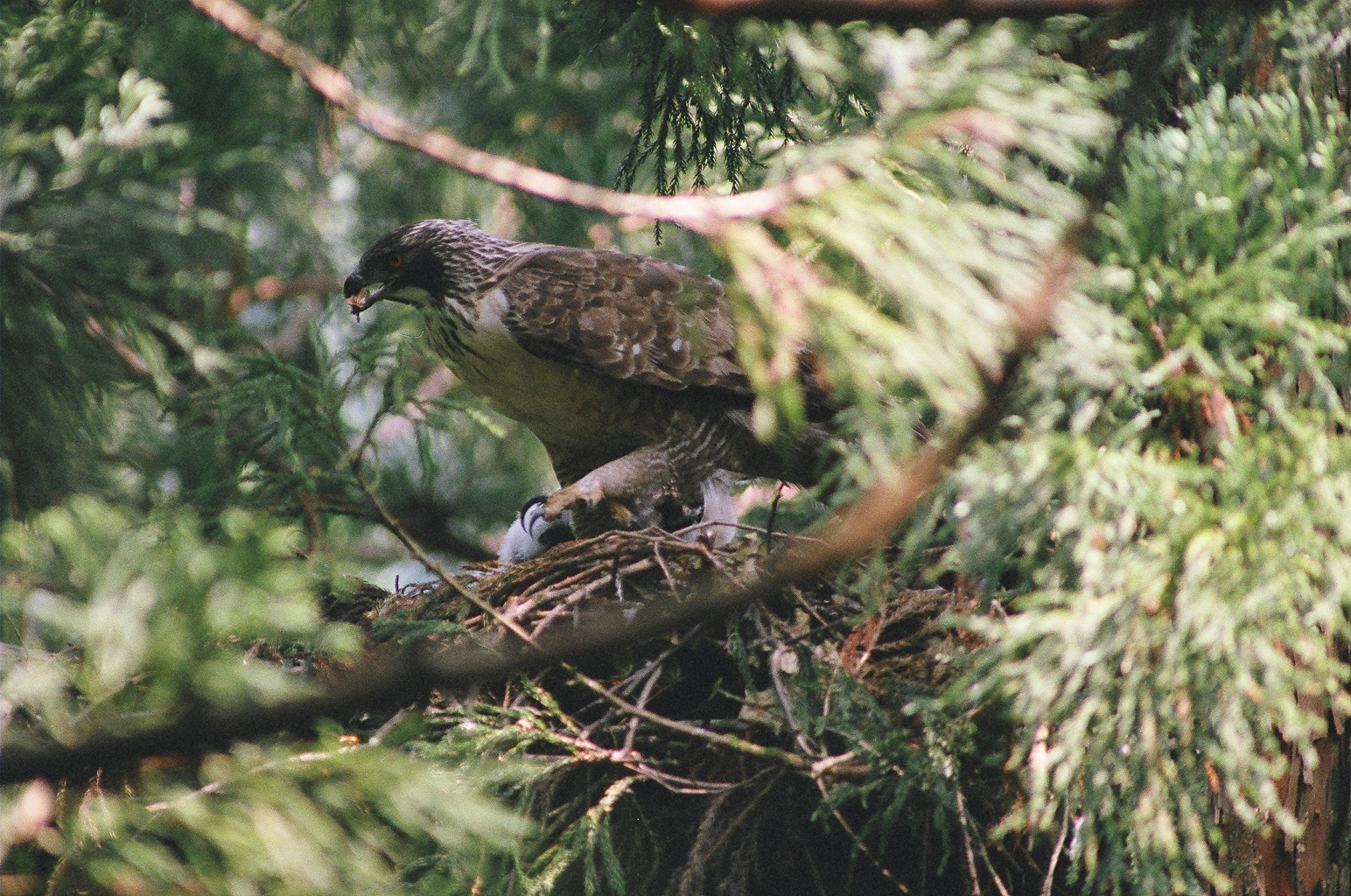
A female mountain hawk-eagle in Japan dismantles prey on her nest.

The mountain hawk-eagle maintain their home range with a rather spectacular aerial display. Display activities tend to peak within the time period prior to breeding. Their aerial display includes conspicuous and often noisy high circling, both single and mutual, and undulating sky dance of steep dives and climbs with bubbling call uttered at each peak. Like many raptors, the display is likely largely to proclaim ownership to conspecifics but also probably has some function in reinforcing existing pair bonds. The breeding season falls between February and June in the Himalayas while in Japan, it falls from April to July. The laying dates largely correspond to early spring or colder dry season in most of their range. The pair builds a large stick nest, that can be up to 1.8 m (5.9 ft) across and 90 to 120 cm (35 to 47 in) deep (after repeated uses). Pairs may have as many as 2 to 3 nests but usually have just one. The male in the pair is said to bring most of the nest materials while female is said to primarily construct the nest. As in many accipitrids, active nests are more often than not lined with greenery, usually either green leaves or conifer sprigs. Nests are usually located at 12 to 30 m (39 to 98 ft) above the ground in a large forest tree, though also sometimes more isolated trees such as Deodar cedars (Cedrus deodara), which were popular in the Himalayas region. In the Indian subcontinent, sal trees (Shorea robusta) and red cedar (Toona ciliata) are favored at slightly lower elevation forests whereas deodar cedars, pines, holly, saj (Terminalia elliptica) and moru oak (Quercus floribunda) are often favored at higher elevations. Many nests are often near a steep-edged ravine, or alternately near a natural tree line, freshwater wetland or other environment that provides ample view of the surrounding area. Clutch size is usually 1 or 2 but up to 3 eggs in a clutch have been reported in Japan. It is claimed that one egg is considered the norm in most of the range, as is invariably the case in the related changeable hawk-eagle. The egg is pale clay-colored or reddish in colour with varied freckling of darker red or pure white, and often with blotches and spots of red at the large end. A sample of egg sizes in the nominate subspecies showed a range of 65 to 72.7 mm (2.56 to 2.86 in) in height, with an average of 69.9 mm (2.75 in) while the range in diameter was 51.2 to 57.4 mm (2.02 to 2.26 in), with an average of 53.8 mm (2.12 in). One egg from N. n. orientalis measured 69 mm × 56 mm (2.7 in × 2.2 in). It has been claimed that only the female will incubate and will be fed by the male. Hatching dates seem to peak around mid-March in the Indian subcontinent. At one nest, an immature male was recorded as the mate of an adult female. In another case, when the female in a pair died during nesting, the following year the male paired with another female and used a nest 200 m (660 ft) from the original nest.

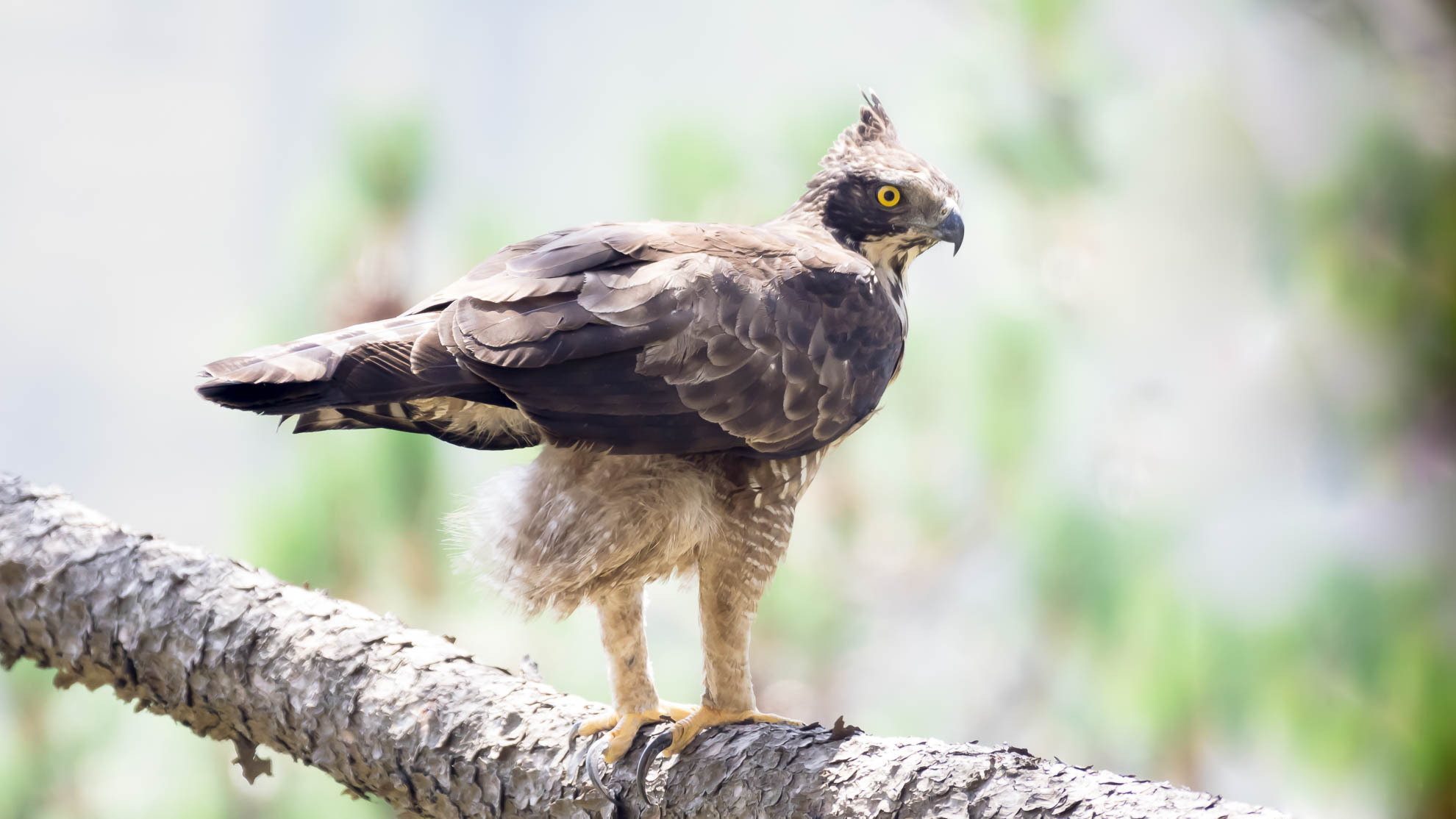
An adult mountain hawk-eagle.

As is typical of accipitrids, the female takes by far the primary role in brooding and protecting the young, while the male makes prey deliveries into the nest or the nearby nest vicinity. Reportedly, the female is very aggressive if nest is disturbed but male is less so or not at all. The aggressiveness of the female may rival that of the often co-occurring spot-bellied eagle-owl and even outrival the defensive attacks on human by the more powerful African crowned eagle. Cousins such as the Legge's and changeable hawk-eagle do not typically display any aggression or, if so, are very mild in protective behaviour towards humans while nesting. Apparently, wood-cutters in particular often attract the ire of the female mountain hawk-eagle. Unlike attacks on humans by crowned eagles and northern goshawks, the attack of mountain hawk-eagle is unlikely to be deterred either by traveling in parties or counterattack. Even when struck with branches, machetes or fist and hit with buckshot by humans, apparently the female will still not cease her attack unless killed or grievously injured. In one case, a local woman in the Kumaon division of northern India fell victim to a "particularly savage" attack by a female mountain hawk-eagle and subsequently died from the injuries sustained. Cases have been observed in north India where rhesus macaques, northern plains gray langurs (Semnopithecus entellus) and yellow-throated martens, all known nest predators, have been driven off by the female hawk-eagle, in the case of the marten while repeatedly raking the back as it ran off. The males may make up to two prey deliveries each day but in the area of nests around disturbed village-side forest in India seemed to have problems procuring a sufficient amount of prey. Caches of food may be kept during incubation and the early nestling stage but generally cease thereafter. After about three weeks, the young are more active and may engage in wing stretching and flapping. At this point, the female takes to a perch about 50 to 100 m (160 to 330 ft) away but continues to watchfully protect the young. The young may soon also be able to feed themselves but are often apparently fed by the mother well after this. Reportedly family remains together for some time after young fly and the young eagle is fed until they can fly more strongly. In Japan, an eaglet that hatched in April flew by the end of June. In India, the minimum amount of time from hatching to leaving the nest was claimed as 53 days. The breeding cycle lasts for at least 80 days.

== In human culture ==
The eagle's feathers are coveted among indigenous Paiwan and Rukai peoples of Taiwan; the Rukai especially regard it as sacred being a reincarnation of the sharp-nosed viper who guided their ancestors.

== Status ==
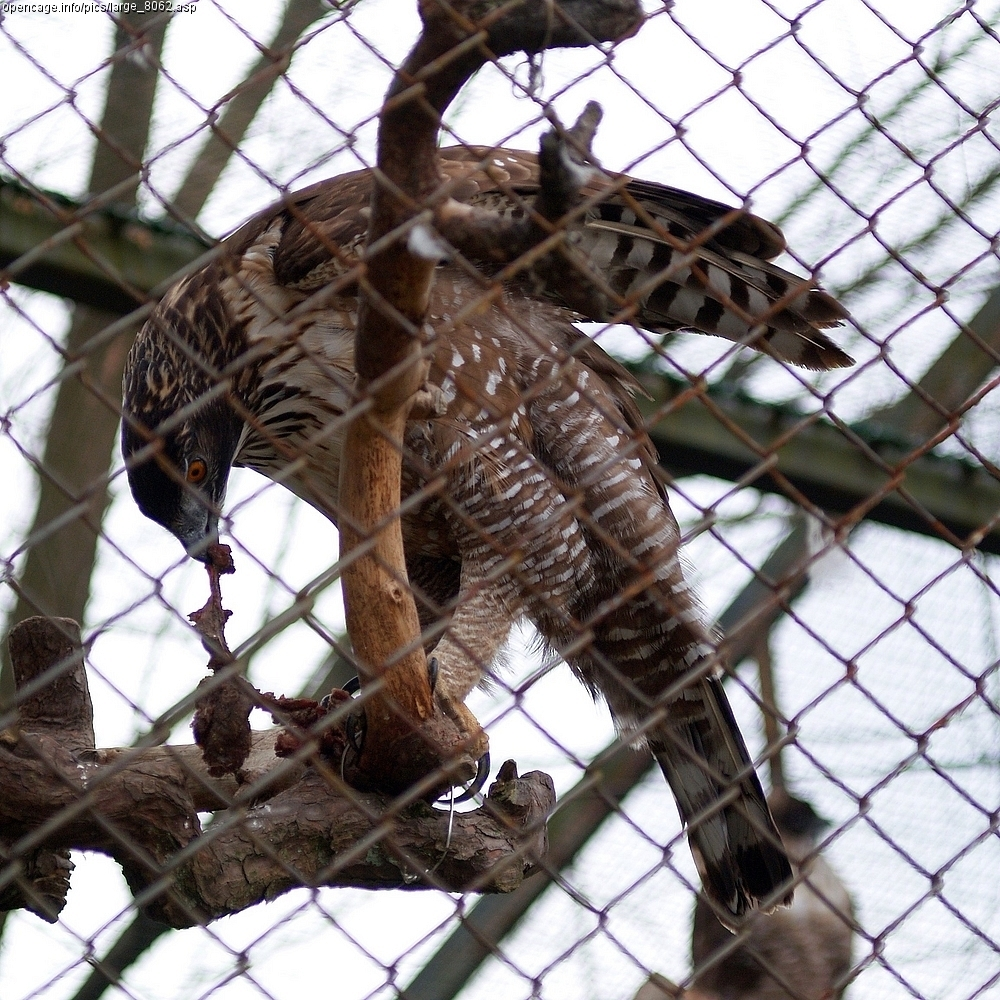
A captive specimen of the threatened Japanese subspecies, N. n. orientalis.

Though it is not considered a globally threatened species, the mountain hawk-eagle is never more than uncommon to rare locally. It occurs over a rather large distributional range that apparently extends over 19 million square kilometers. However, in estimations from the late 1990s, it was considered doubtful that the density of mountain hawk-eagle was high enough to reach 10,000 individuals, even with the now-separated Legge's hawk-eagle included at that time and all juveniles. High levels of various habitat degradation and deforestation is probably the primary driver of declines throughout the range. In particular, the increasing density of human populations in northern India, southeastern China and Japan are likely to continue to facilitate declines in forest quantity and quality. Likely more localized and minor threats from humans are persecution as occasional killers of domestic poultry. Despite their popularity in Asian falconry, it is unlikely gathering of hawk-eagles for this is a significant problem. Lead poisoning from consuming carcasses of sika deer, left there by human hunters using lead bullets, have resulted in the death of some mountain hawk-eagles. Mountain hawk-eagles may be vulnerable to viruses and helminths as well. Similar threats are faced by all Nisaetus hawk-eagles, with only the changeable hawk-eagle shown to be resilient to human interferences and not in decline at the species level. The Japanese population of mountain hawk-eagles is particularly showing signs of decline. In the 1990s, the Japanese population was estimated at 900–1,000 total individuals and may have reduced even more so today from that figure. As the species is a K-strategist like all eagles, it was feared that the ongoing population reduction of N. n. orientalis might lead to loss of genetic diversity, and consequently inbreeding depression. However, genetic diversity was shown to be still considerable at present.
