= Congdon =

Congdon may refer to:

== People ==
- Amanda Congdon (born 1981), American ABC producer
- Bevan Congdon (born 1938), former New Zealand cricketer
- Charles Congdon (1909–1965), American professional golfer
- Charles Congdon (cricketer) (1891–1958), English cricketer
- Chester Adgate Congdon (1853–1916), American lawyer and capitalist
- Daniel Keen Congdon (1840–1907), Australian politician
- David Congdon (born 1949), British former Conservative Party politician
- Elisabeth Congdon (1894–1977), American millionaire
- Frederick Tennyson Congdon (1858–1932), Canadian politician and lawyer
- Gary Congdon (1937–1967), American racecar driver
- George Congdon Gorham (1832–1909), Republican California politician and newspaper editor
- Henry Martyn Congdon (1834–1922), American architect and designer
- James Madison (Medal of Honor) (1842–1926), American soldier
- Jeff Congdon (born 1943), American basketball player
- Joseph Whipple Congdon (1834–1910), lawyer
- Lee Walter Congdon (born 1939), writer and historian
- Lisa Congdon (born 1968), American author and illustrator
- Shirley Congdon (born 1961), English educator and nurse
- Thomas Congdon (1931–2008), American book editor
- Tim Congdon (born 1951), British economist
- William Congdon (1912–1998), New York artist Hiram Congdon House

== Places ==
- Congdon Park (Duluth), a neighborhood in Duluth, Minnesota
- Congdon Street Baptist Church, an historically African American church in Providence, Rhode Island
- Congdon River, a river in Rhode Island
- Hiram Congdon House, a historic home located at Putnam in Washington County, New York built about 1848

== Other ==
- SS Chester A. Congdon, a 1907 bulk steel freighter

== See also ==
- Congdon's Shop, a hamlet in North Hill, Cornwall, GB
