= Tōjinbō =

Cliffs on the Sea of Japan

- IUCN category IV (habitat/species management area)
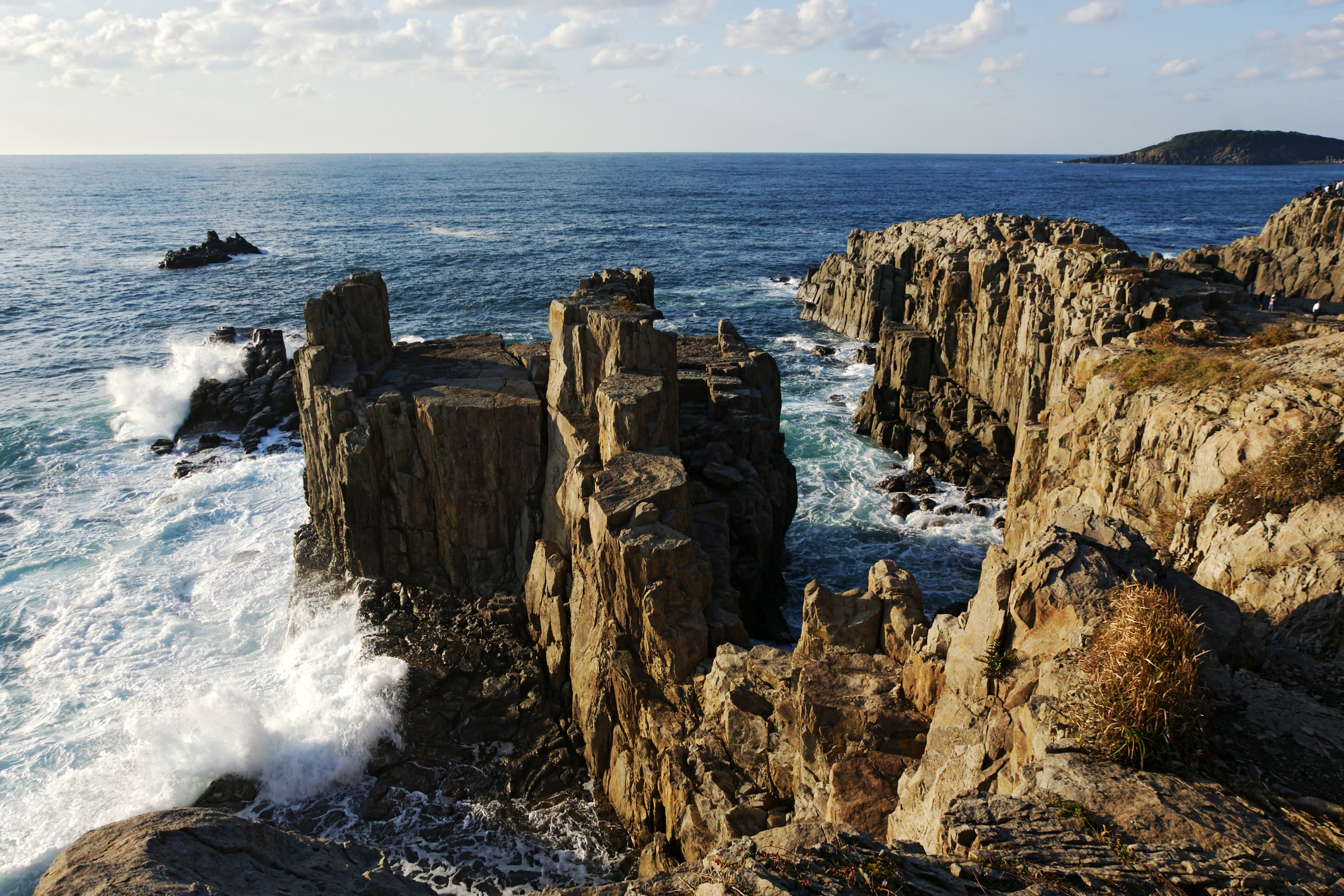
- Sandan Rocks and Byobu Rocks

- Location within Fukui Prefecture Location within Japan
- Location: Sakai, Fukui, Japan
- Coordinates: 36.238°N 136.125°E
- Established: 1935
- National Place of Scenic Beauty Natural Monument

Tōjinbō (東尋坊) is a series of cliffs on the Sea of Japan in Japan made from columnar joints of pyroxene andesite. It is located in the Antō part of Mikuni-chō in Sakai, Fukui Prefecture. The cliffs average 30 metres (98 ft) in height and stretch for 1 km (3,281 ft). The site has been protected from 1935 as a nationally designated Place of Scenic Beauty and Natural Monument, It has been developed as a tourist destination, with walking trails, sightseeing boats, an observation tower, and a shopping arcade. The area is part of the Echizen-Kaga Kaigan Quasi-National Park.

== Formation ==
The cliffs' rocks were originally formed 12 to 13 million years ago during the Miocene Epoch due to various volcanic activities, and were created by magma mixing with sedimentary rock to form columnar joints of pyroxene andesite containing Plagioclase crystals, Augite and Enstatite crystals in pentagonal or hexagonal shapes, which has been eroded by the sea. This formation is considered geologically extremely rare, and is one of only three such structures in the world of this magnitude.

== Legends ==
One legend has it that a corrupt Buddhist priest from Heisen-ji (平泉寺), a local temple, so enraged the populace that they dragged him from the temple and, at Tōjinbō, threw him into the sea. His ghost is still said to haunt the area.

An alternate legend says that the name Tōjinbō comes from a dissolute Buddhist monk. According to the legend, a Buddhist monk named Tōjinbō, who relied on his incredible strength to commit all sorts of crimes against the people. When he went on a rampage, he was uncontrollable and no one could stop him. He fell in love with a beautiful princess named Aya. In 1182, the monks of Heisen-ji got together and decided to invite Tōjinbō out to enjoy a day of sightseeing. They arrived at a spot overlooking the ocean from a high cliff, sat on the rocks, and began drinking. Perhaps aided by the fine weather and beautiful scenery, eventually, Tōjinbō became drunk, lay down, and began to doze off. Another monk, a rival in affection for Princess Aya, used the opportunity to pushed push him off these cliffs into the sea. The legend says that ever after that time Tōjinbō's vengeful ghost would go on a rampage around the same time every year at this place, causing strong winds and rain. Some decades later, an itinerant priest took pity on Tōjinbō and held a memorial service for him. After that, the storms ceased.

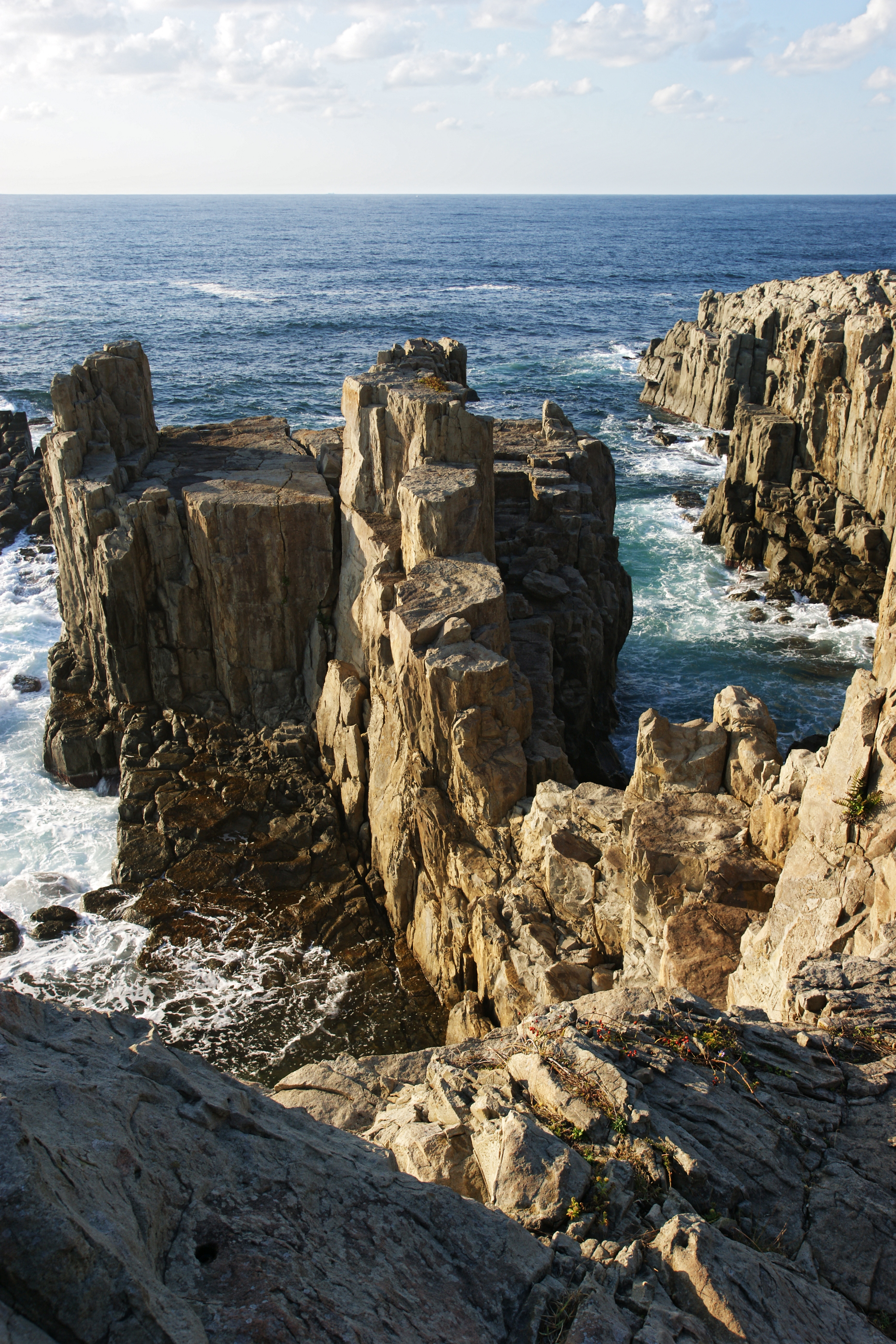
Sandan Rocks

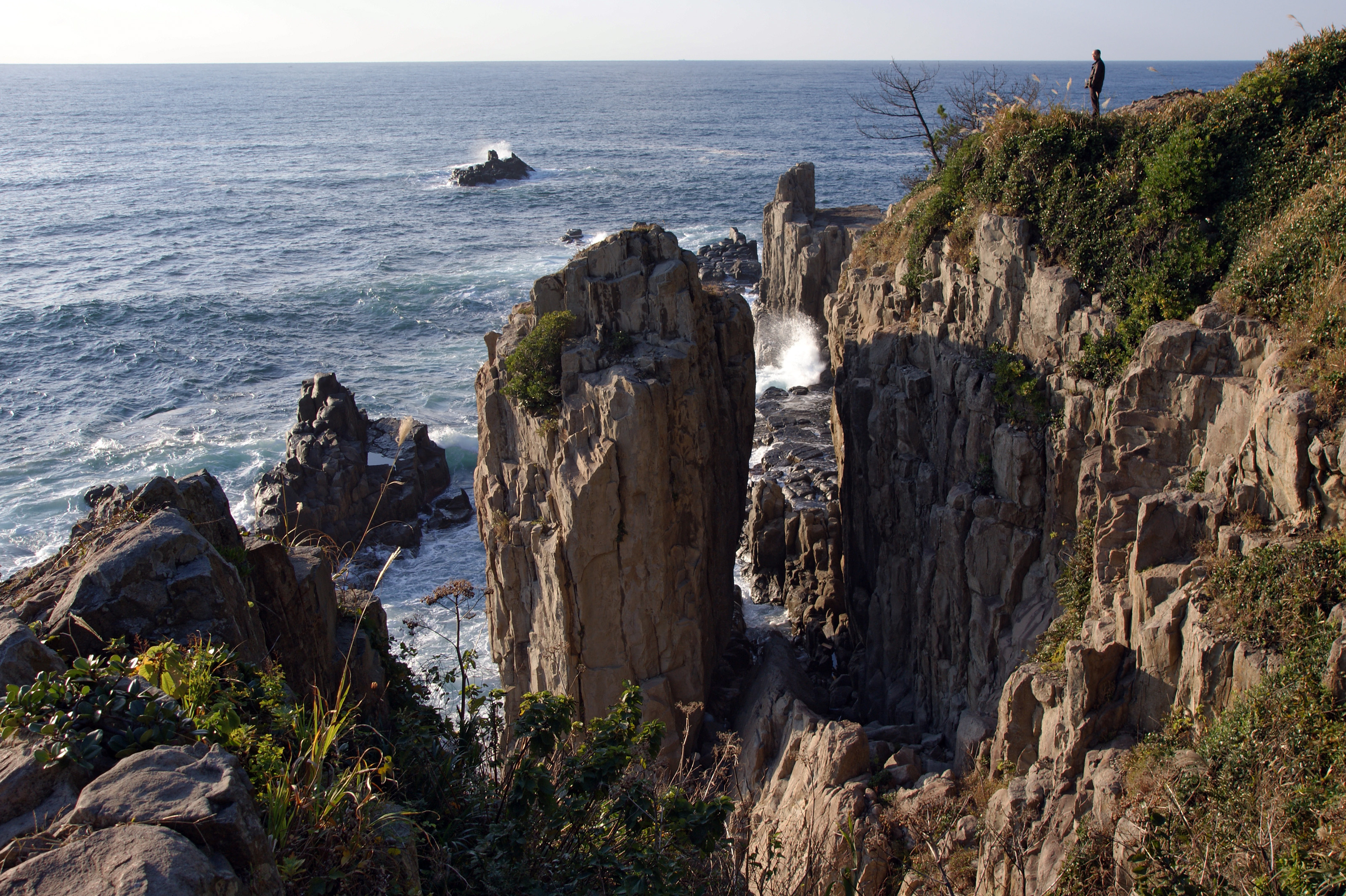
Rosoku Rocks

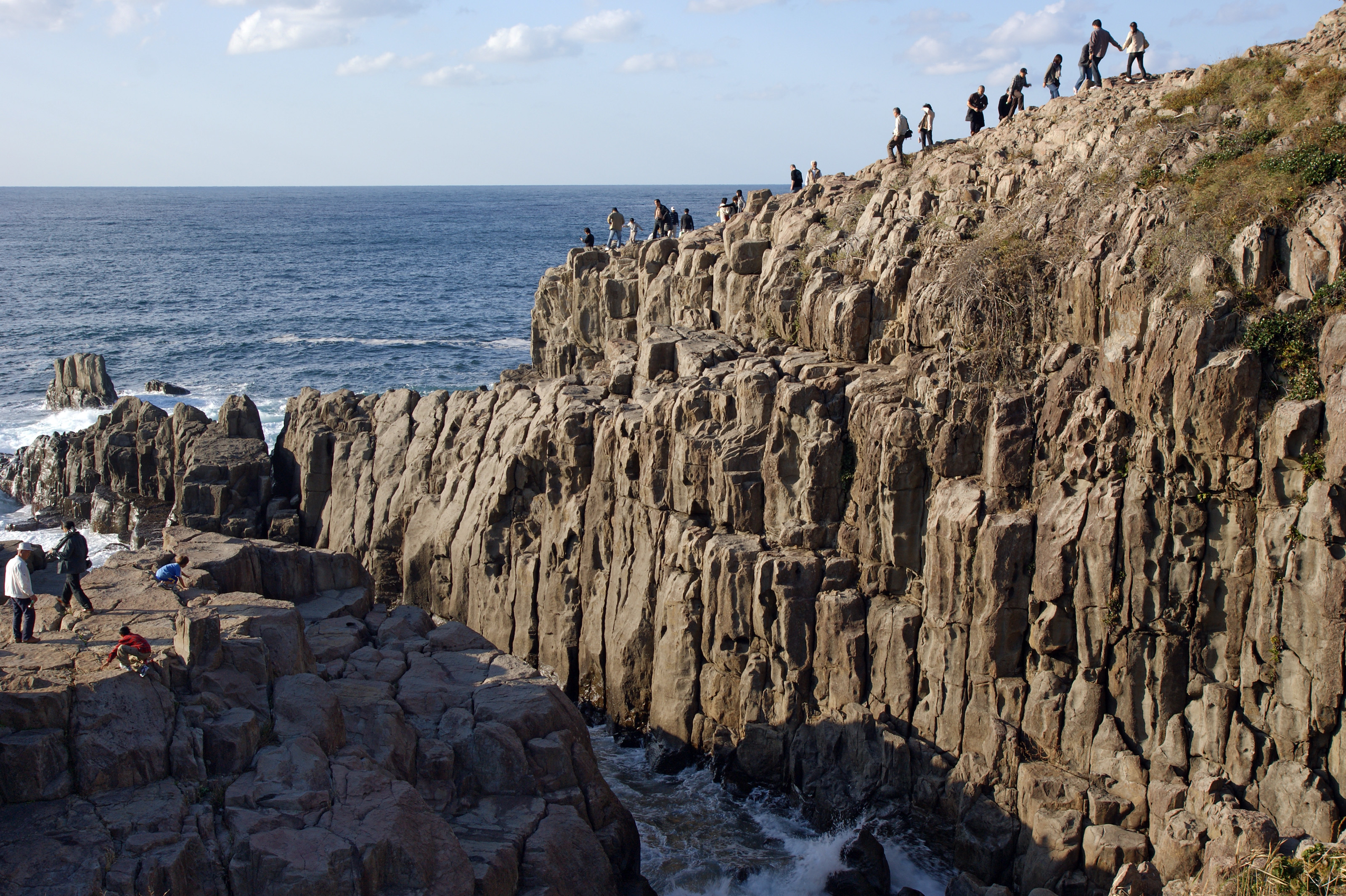
Byobu Rocks

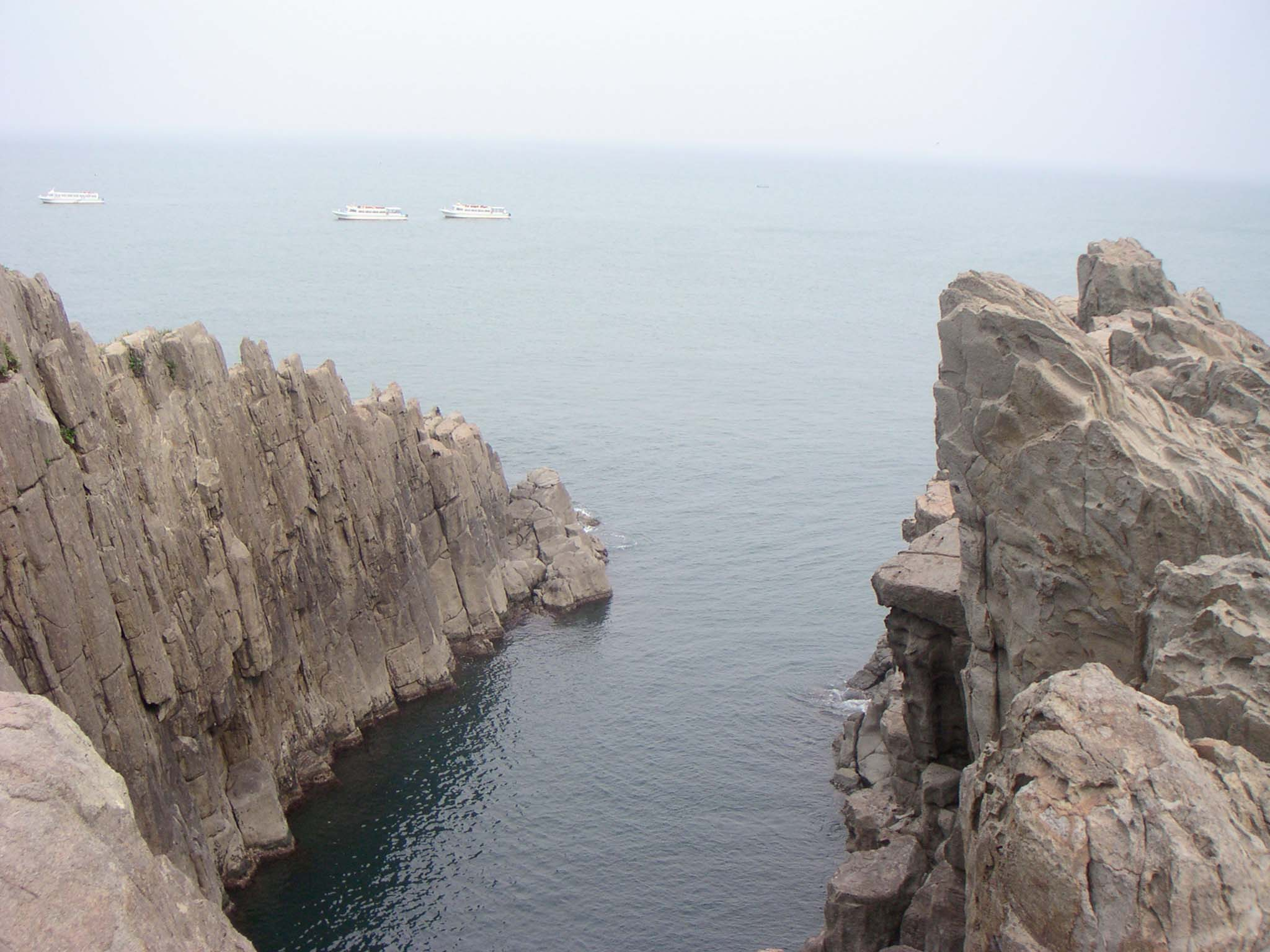
25 m (82 ft) high Oike

== Suicides ==
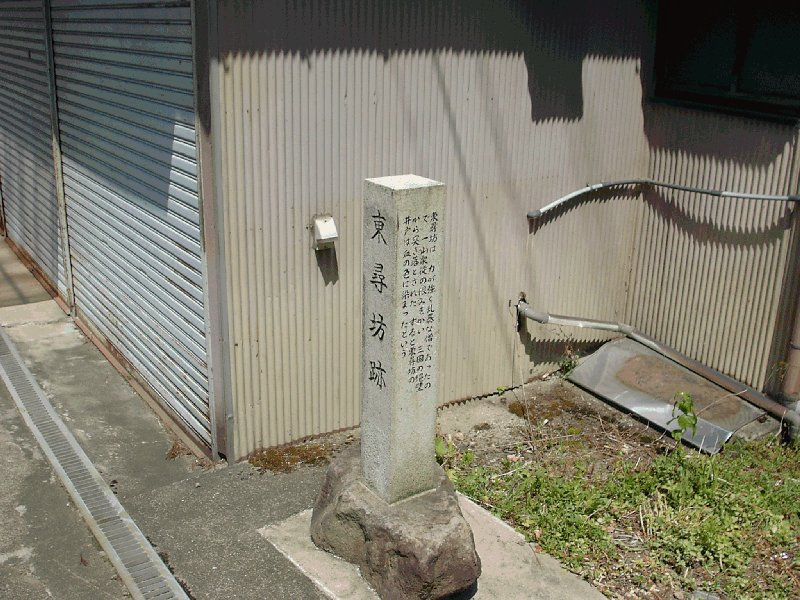
The historical pillar of Tojinbo (priest-tojinbo)'s house whose name has been given to the landform of Tojinbo from which he was reputedly thrown by followers of the temple for punishment for his misbehavior, in Heisen-ji, Katsuyama, Fukui, Japan

Tōjinbō is also a well-known place in Japan to commit suicide. According to statistics, as many as 25 people commit suicide by jumping off the 70-foot (21 m) high cliffs annually, a number which has risen and fallen with Japan's national economic hardships and unemployment rates. In the 2000s, Yukio Shige, a retired police officer, frustrated at having had to fish so many bodies out of the sea and the inaction of local authorities, began patrolling the cliffs for potential jumpers. As of 2015 it was reported that he and the volunteers at the NPO he founded have saved over 500 lives.

Although 14 people committed suicide there in 2016, in 2017, there had been no suicides for months. Yukio Shige says it is partly because many people come there to catch rare creatures in the mobile phone game Pokémon Go.

== See also ==
- List of Places of Scenic Beauty of Japan (Fukui)
