= Hiraizumi (disambiguation) =

Hiraizumi is a town in Iwate Prefecture, Japan.

Hiraizumi may also refer to:

- Hiraizumi Station, train station in Hiraizumi, Iwate, Japan
- 29249 Hiraizumi, main-belt minor planet

== People with the surname ==
- Gina Hiraizumi (born 1980), American actress and singer
- Hiraizumi Kiyoshi (平泉 澄, 1895–1984), Japanese historian and Shinto priest
- Sei Hiraizumi (平泉 成, born 1944), Japanese actor
