= Hiraizumi Kiyoshi =

Japanese historian and priest (d. 1984)

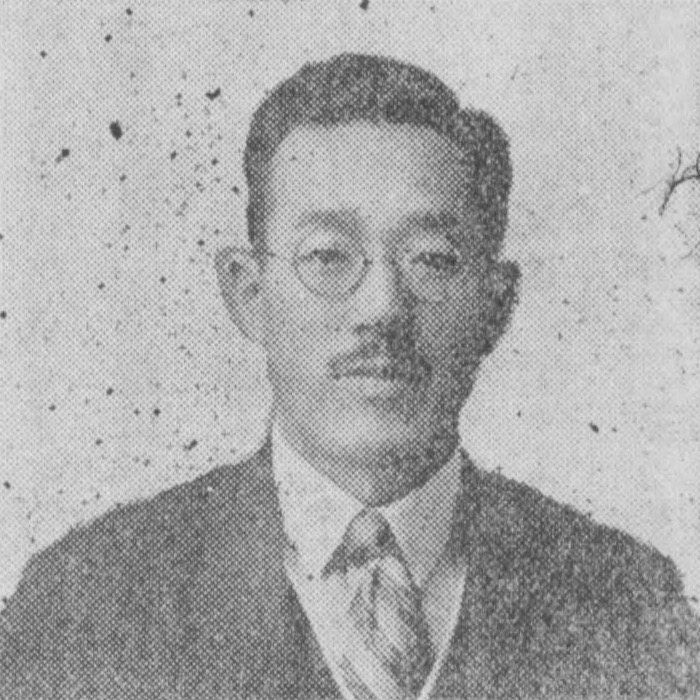
Hiraizumi in 1928.

Hiraizumi Kiyoshi (平泉 澄; 15 February 1895 – 18 February 1984) was a Japanese historian and professor of history at the Imperial University of Tokyo. He is best known for Kōkoku Shikan (皇國史観, the emperor-centred view of history) theory and was highly influential in Japanese conservative and nationalist politics. He was also a shinto priest at Heisenji Hakusan Shrine.

== Life and work ==
Hiraizumi was born on 15 February 1895 to a father who was a priest at the Heisenji Hakusan shrine in Katsuyama. He was educated at Fourth Higher School (Kanazawa University), graduating from Tokyo Imperial University in 1918.

He began working as a lecturer at his alma mater only a few years later, in 1923, and three years later held the post of associate professor in the Faculty of Letters; in 1935 he was promoted to full professor. He also helped to found the History Education Seminar, which oversaw the content of history textbooks; he also contributed to educational materials for both the police and the military. Hiraizumi promulgated an approach to history known as kōkoku goji shikan, a highly nationalist view centred on the importance of Imperial Japan. This view gained official endorsement from the Ministry of Education. Despite being technically subordinate to the departmental head, Kuroita Katsume, Hiraizumi was considered by the faculty's students to be in charge of the history department. With the backing of the Ministry, Hiraizumi created a new course known as Nihon shisoshi koza or History of Japanese Thought, which was highly politicised, emphasising Hiraizumi's belief in the divine origin of the Japanese Imperial line. He also chaired a political student organisation named the Shukokai, which promulgated nationalist views enshrining the importance of the Emperor, and was appointed by Kanokogi Kazunobu as a member of the Dai Ajia Kyokai (Greater Asian Association), a group of politicians, diplomats and others which was dedicated to spreading Japanese nationalist thinking throughout Asia. This society included Kōki Hirota, Konoe Fumimaro and Araki Sadao among its members, as well as many other notable personages.

Hiraizumi had travelled in Europe during the early 1930s. He took inspiration from the German nationalism of Gottlieb Fichte, but was heavily critical of the French Revolution, considering the concept of civilian revolution to be an entirely foreign concept to the Japanese.

Hiraizumi resigned from the university after the Allied Occupation, and returned to his home prefecture of Fukui, though he continued to give lectures. He continued to espouse nationalist views and argued in favour of a mythology-based version of history (even his later books claim the Emperor Jimmu was a real historical figure and treat the Nihon Shoki and Kojiki as historical sources). However, without Hiraizumi's presence the ultra-nationalist trends of the university's history department began to be reversed, and his views began to fall out of fashion, replaced by Marxist historiography. Eventually, Hiraizumi took up his father's role as a priest at the Heisenji Hakusan Shrine, where the spirit of Izanami is enshrined; on his retirement in 1981 the role passed to his son, Akira Hiraizumi. Hiraizumi died on 18 February 1984.

== Major works ==
- Chusei ni okeru seishin seikatsu (Spiritual Life in Medieval Japan), 1926
- Chusei ni okeru shaji to shakai to no kankei (The Relationship of Shrines and Temples in the Society of Medieval Japan)
- Kokushigaku no kotsuzui (The Heart of National History)
- Kenmu chuko no hongi (True Meaning of the Kenmu Restoration), 1934
- Shonen Nihon Shi (Japanese History for Young People), 1970
