= Aleksy Ćwiakowski =

Polish monarchist

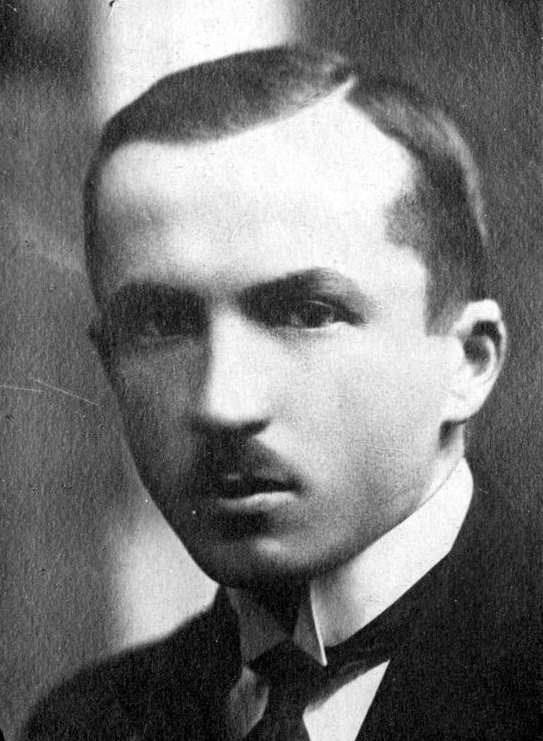
- Aleksy Ćwiakowski - Polish politician
- Born: 5 April 1895
- Died: 4 August 1953 (aged 58); London
- Occupation: Political activist
- Known for: Co-founder and leader of the country's monarchist movement

Aleksy Ćwiakowski (5 April 1895 – 4 August 1953) was a Polish political activist of the 1920s whose influence rested in his status as the co-founder and leader of the country's monarchist movement.

A native of the Częstochowa County village of Sygontka, Aleksy Ćwiakowski withdrew from politics in 1930 and, during the destruction of World War II and subsequent Communist takeover, was able to make his way to London, where he died in the year of his 58th birthday, 1953.
