= Echizen-Kaga Kaigan Quasi-National Park =

Quasi-national park on the coast of Fukui and Ishikawa prefectures, Japan

Coordinates: 36°14′38″N 136°12′24″E

- 越前加賀海岸国定公園
- IUCN category V (protected landscape/seascape)
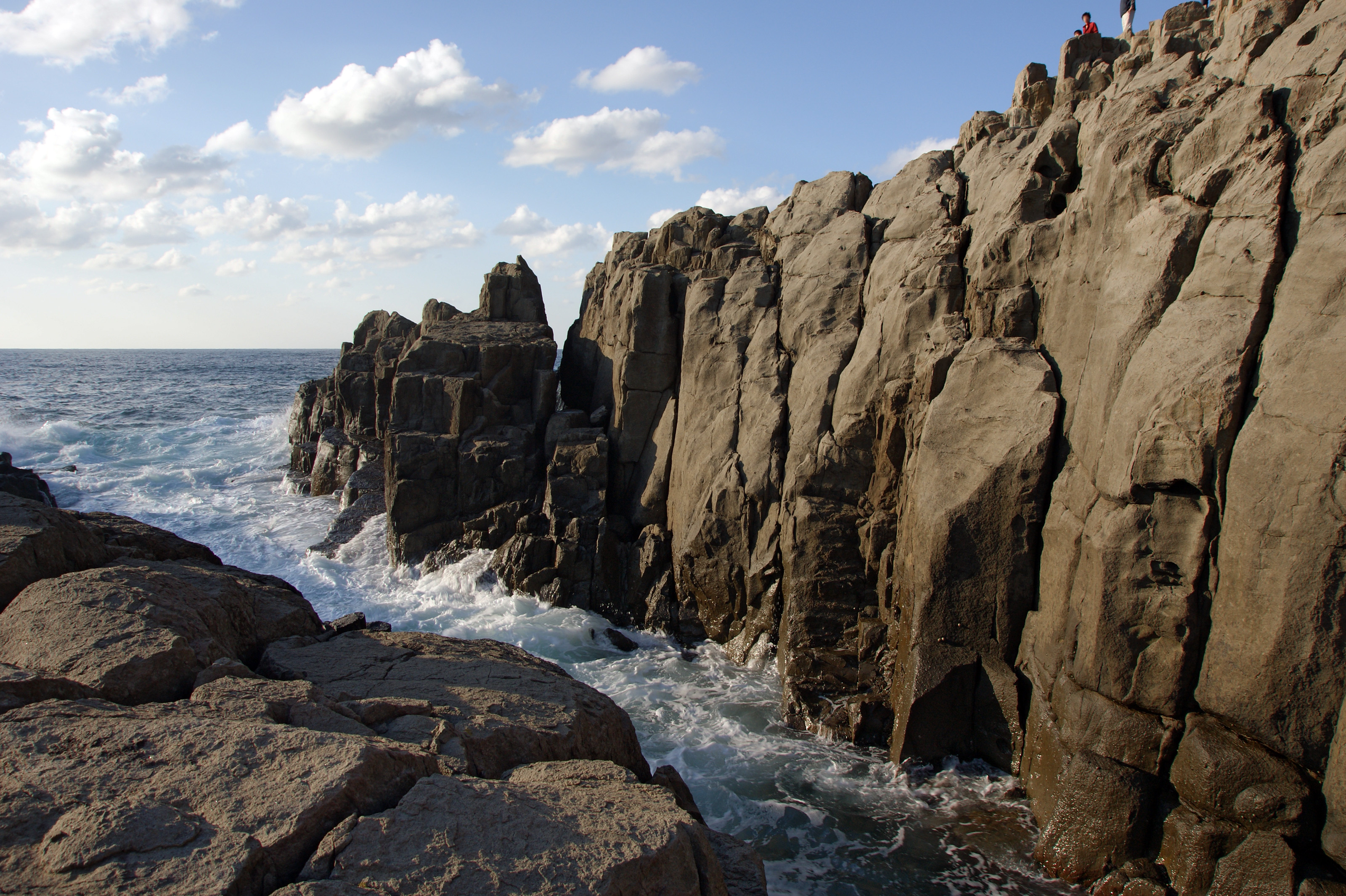
- Tōjinbō

- Location within Japan
- Location: Fukui/Ishikawa Prefecture, Japan
- Area: 9,246 hectares (35.70 sq mi)
- Established: 1 May 1968

Echizen-Kaga Kaigan Quasi-National Park (越前加賀海岸国定公園, Echizen-Kaga Kaigan Kokutei Kōen) is a quasi-national park on the coast of Fukui and Ishikawa prefectures in Japan, established in 1968. It is rated a protected landscape (category Ib) according to the IUCN. Like all Quasi-National Parks in Japan, Echizen-Kaga Kaigan Quasi-National Park is managed by the local prefectural governments.

== Sites of interest ==
The park consists of several discontinuous locations, which include:

- Kochōmon (呼鳥門), Oshima (雄島), Tōjinbō

== Related municipalities ==
- Fukui: Awara, Echizen, Fukui, Minamiechizen, Sakai, Tsuruga
- Ishikawa: Kaga

== See also ==
- National Parks of Japan
