= Heisenji Hakusan Shrine =

Shinto shrine in Fukui Prefecture, Japan

Heisenji Hakusan Shrine 平泉寺白山神社
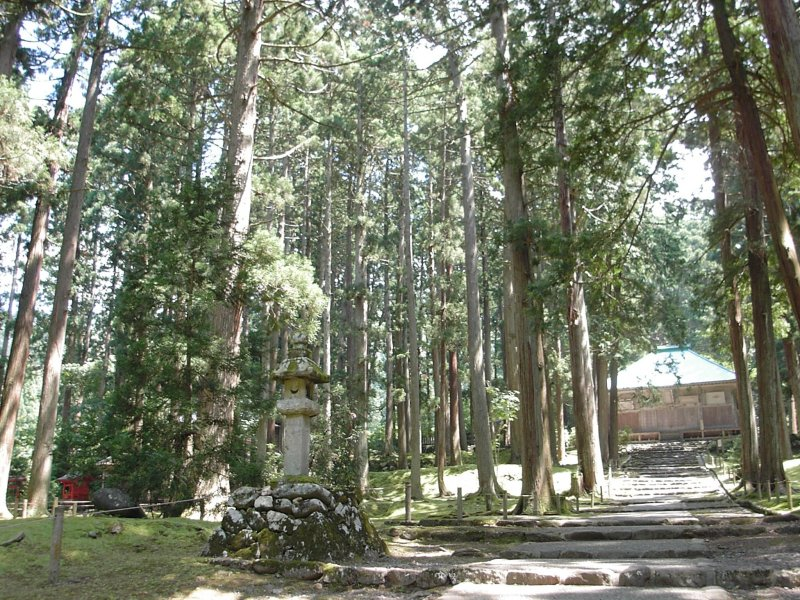
- Precincts of Heisenji Hakusan Shrine

- Heisenji Hakusan Jinja Heisenji Hakusan Shrine (Japan)

Religion
- Affiliation: Shinto
- Deity: Izanami
- Festival: April 20

Location
- Location: 6 Heisenjichō Heisenji, Katsuyama-shi, Fukui-ken 911-0822
- Coordinates: 36°02′38″N 136°32′31″E

Architecture
- Established: 717 AD

Heisenji Hakusan Shrine (平泉寺白山神社, Heisenji Hakusan jinja) is a Shinto shrine in the city of Katsuyama, Fukui Prefecture, Japan. In the former Modern system of ranked Shinto Shrines, it was a prefectural shrine of Fukui Prefecture. Noted for its mossy gardens, the shrine gardens were designated a National Place of Scenic Beauty (名勝) in 1930 and a National Historic Site of Japan in 1935. Its main festival is held annually on April 20. The area of the shrine is within the boundaries of Hakusan National Park.

== History ==
A Tendai sect Buddhist temple, Heisen-ji, was founded in 717 AD by the Japanese Shugendō monk Taichō, who is said to have been the first person to ascend the sacred mountain Hakusan (2,702m) It became a centre for mountain worship involving amalgamation of beliefs, philosophies, doctrines and ritual systems drawn from local folk-religious practices, pre-Buddhist mountain worship, Shinto, Taoism and Vajrayana and ascetic practices involving climbing the mountain by various routes. The temple was mentioned in the Heike Monogatari, and was the site of the 1183 Battle of Kurikara during the Genpei War between Kiso Yoshinaka and the Taira clan. The temple was destroyed in 1338 by the forces of Shiba Takatsune for its support of the Southern Court of Emperor Go-Daigo during the Nanboku-chō period and again in 1440. It was rebuilt with the support of the Muromachi shogunate, which levied a special tax on the seven provinces of the Hokuriku region for its reconstruction. As a result, the temple expanded to a powerful religious city consisting of 48 shrines and 36 temples, along with an urban complex of over 6000 living quarters for priests or shrine personnel. The temple precincts governed a domain yielding revenues of 90,000 koku, giving it a kokudaka which rivalled that of a daimyō, and it could field an army of 8000 sōhei warrior-monks.

However, the whole temple was destroyed again in 1574 by Asakura Kageaki during the Echizen Ikkō-ikki uprising. Despite subsequent effort of reconstruction, the temple precincts were reduced to less than one tenth its former area, and its kokudaka was reduced to 330 koku; many ruins of temples were buried under forests and fields.

Due to the Ordinance Distinguishing Shinto and Buddhism issued at the beginning of Meiji Period, the temple abandoned Buddhism and became a Shinto shrine.

== Gallery ==
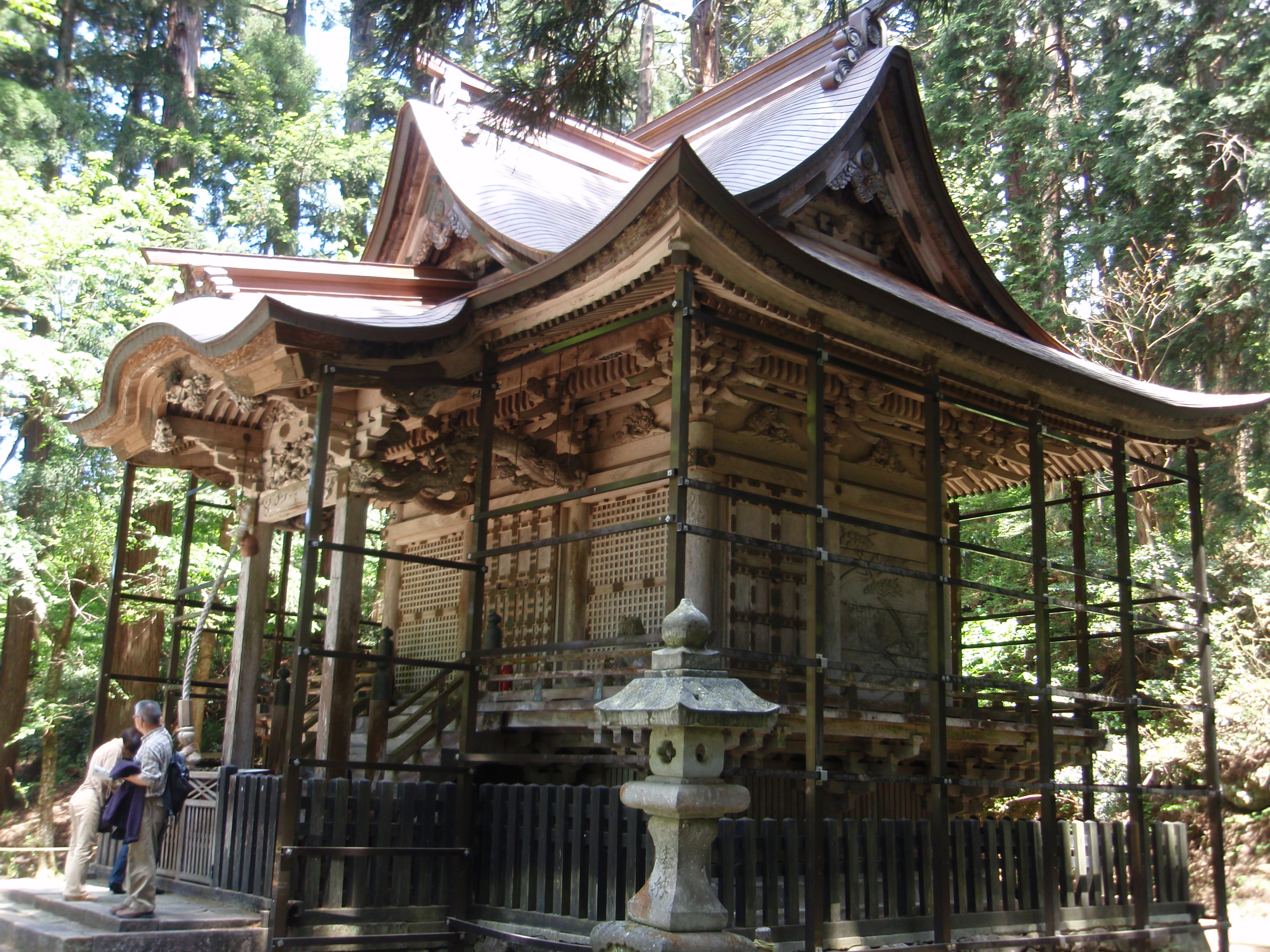
Honden, built in 1795

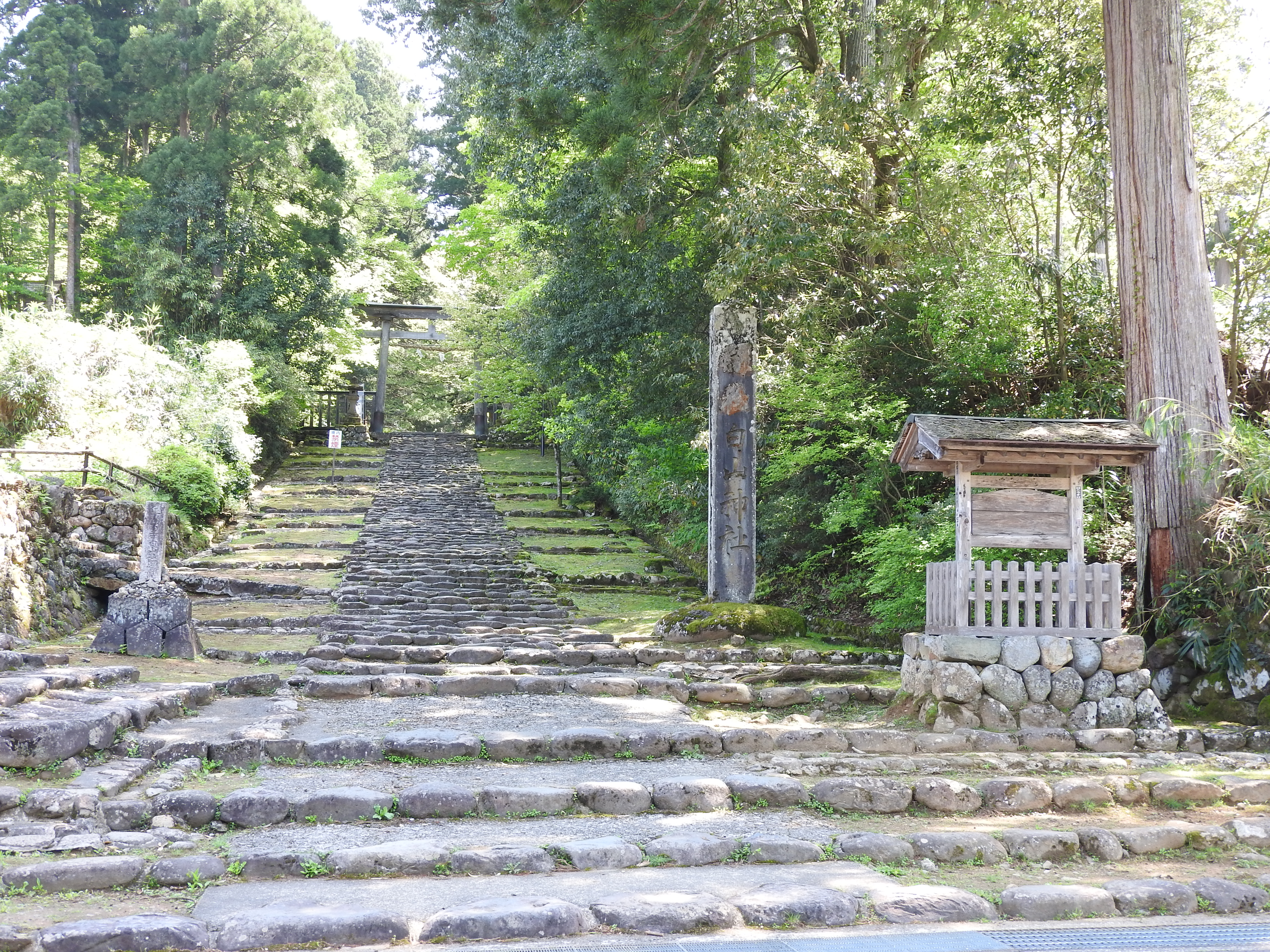
Approach to the shrine

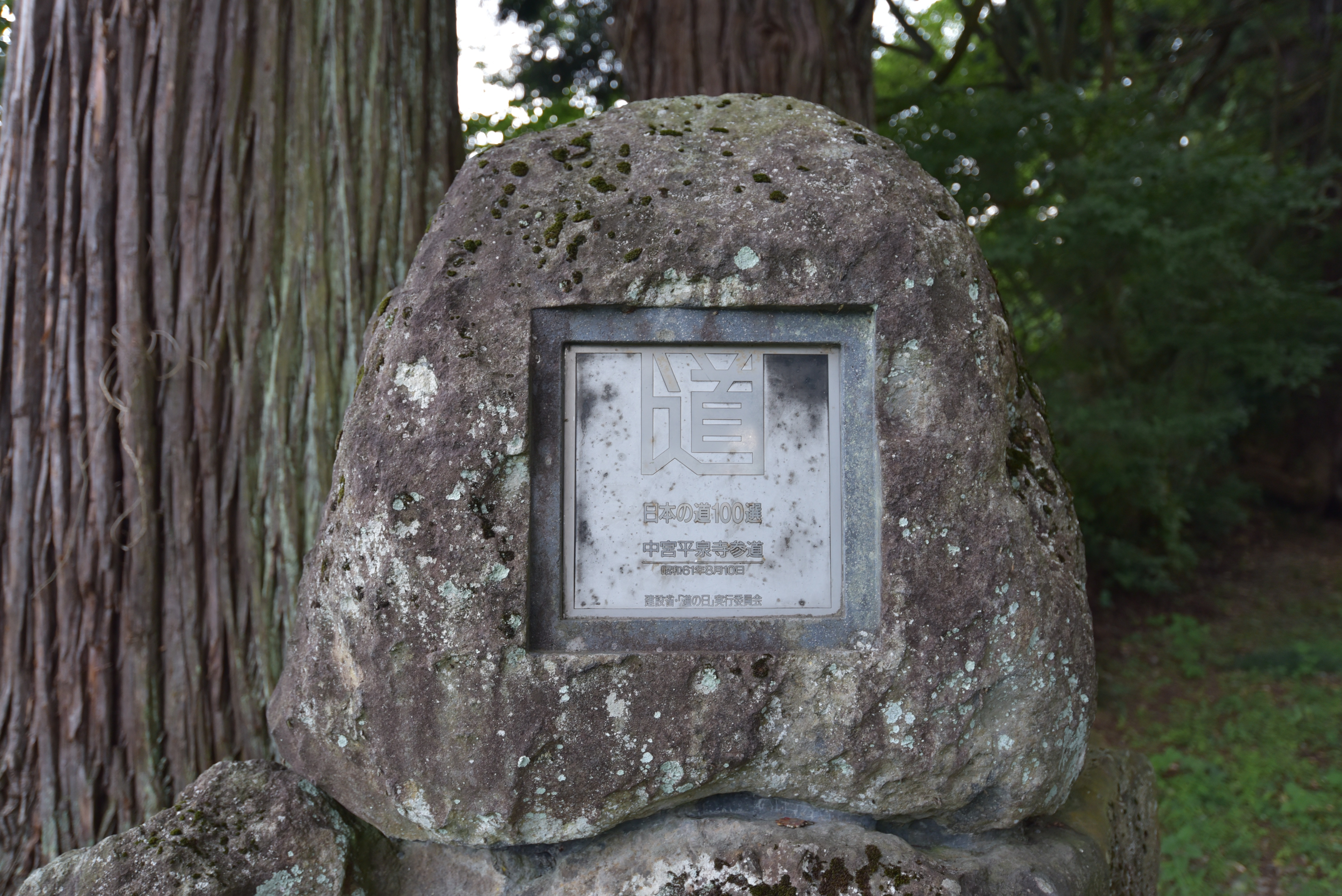
Monument marking the approach as one of the "100 roads of Japan"

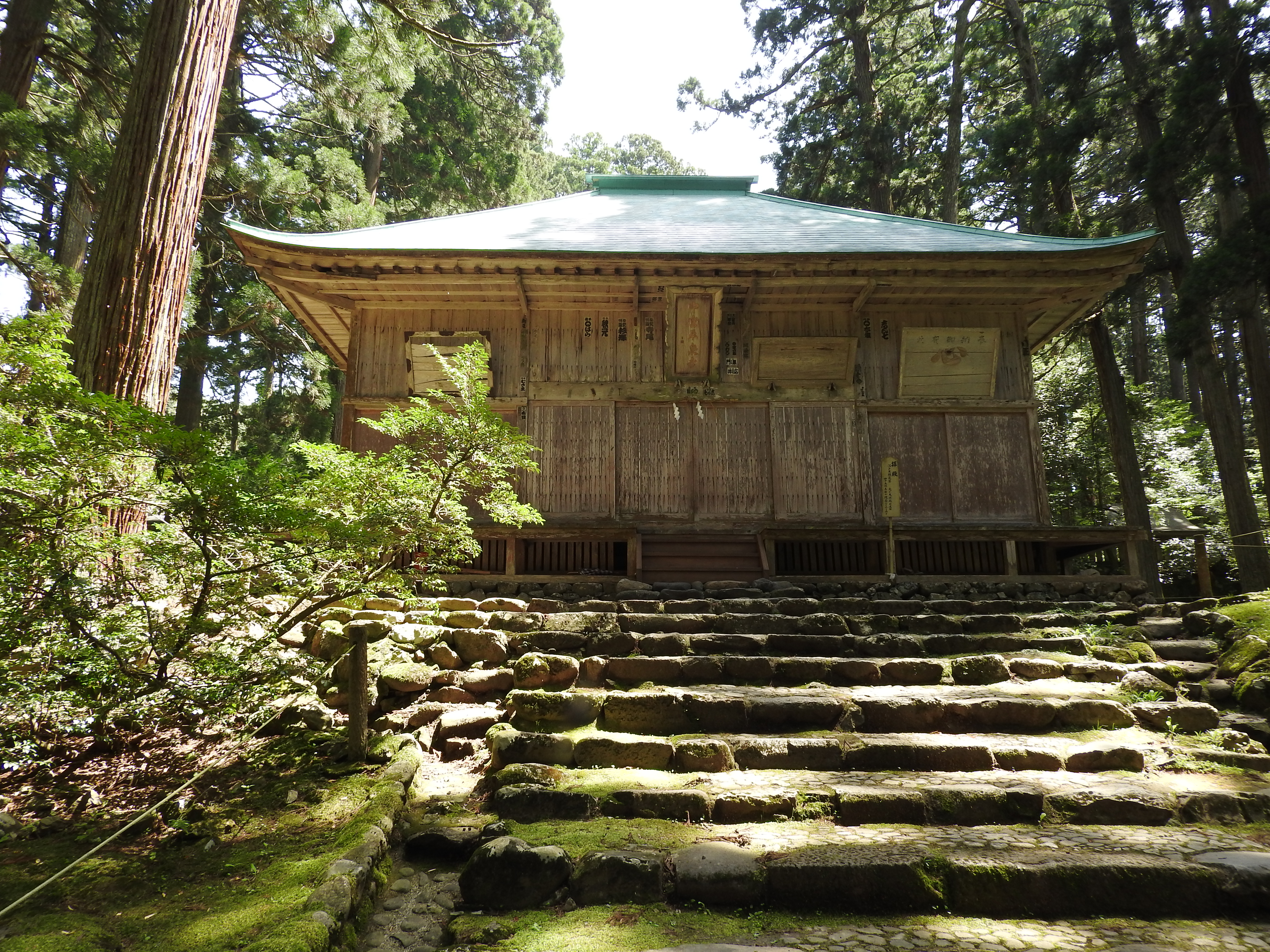
Haiden

== See also ==
- List of Historic Sites of Japan (Fukui)
