= Lee Walter Congdon =

American writer and historian

- Born: Lee Walter Congdon; September 11, 1939 (age 87)
- Occupation: Historian

Academic background
- Education: Wheaton College (Illinois) (BA); Northern Illinois University (MA, PhD)

Lee Walter Congdon (born August 11, 1939) is a writer and historian.

Congdon is the author of four books. The first three were The Young Lukacs (1983), Exile and Social Thought (1991), and Seeing Red (2001). Taken together, the works represent a trilogy examining the contributions of Hungarian intellectuals to 20th century social and political thought. His fourth book was George Kennan: A Writing Life (2008). Congdon also co-edited two books on the Hungarian Revolution.

In 1999 Congdon was awarded the Order of Merit of the Republic of Hungary - Small Cross. In 2006 Congdon retired as Professor of History at James Madison University, after more than thirty years of teaching. He lives in Harrisonburg, Virginia, United States, with his wife. Congdon is an Eastern Orthodox Christian.

In the fall of 2002 Congdon was interviewed in the James Madison University Magazine Montpelier:

Politically, for instance, Congdon veers right of the American right, meaning, within a European context, he is a monarchist. He sees little difference between the competing ideologies of America’s political parties and he professes an abiding admiration and preference over the common-denominator chaos of American democracy for some of Europe’s royalist governments of the latter 19th century, wherein "liberty—not equality—was the highest political value. For European conservatives," Congdon says, "order is first and liberty only within a context of order."

== Notes and references ==
=== Reviews ===
- Review of George Kennan: A Writing Life: JSTOR 25655879
- Review of Hungarian Intellectuals in Exile: JSTOR 20081345*
- Reviews of Exile and Social Thought: JSTOR 2500388, JSTOR 2164815, JSTOR 573995
- Reviews of Seeing Red: JSTOR 3218223, JSTOR 40345786, JSTOR 10.1086/532830
- Reviews of The Young Lukács: JSTOR 20099357, JSTOR 1862668
- Review of Baseball and Memory: JSTOR 10.5406/jsporthistory.40.1.167
- Review of Solzhenitsyn: The Historical-Spiritual Destinies of Russia and the West: JSTOR 45097144.
