= Tranquilino de Bonilla y Herdocia =

Costa Rican politician

Tranquilino de Bonilla y Herdocia (March 7, 1797 in San José, Costa Rica – April 1864 on the Pacific Ocean, near Esparza, Costa Rica) was a nineteenth-century Costa Rican politician. He came from Cartago. His parents were Félix de Bonilla y Pacheco and Rafaela Herdocia Fernández de la Pastora. He married Sinforosa de Peralta y López del Corral, the daughter of José María de Peralta y La Vega y Ana Benita Nava López del Corral.

He held municipal posts in Cartago and attended the October 29, 1821 at the Carthage City Council meeting in which drafted the Declaration of Independence of Costa Rica, which was a signatory.

He was a supporter of the annexation of Costa Rica to the Mexican Empire. As a monarchist officer, he participated in the Battle of Ochomogo on 5 April 1823.
