= Türkmenbaşy (disambiguation) =

Türkmenbaşy ('head/leader of the Turkmen') refers to Saparmurat Niyazov, the first President of Turkmenistan 1991–2006.

Türkmenbaşy may also refer to:

== Populated places ==
- Türkmenbaşy District, in Balkan Region, Turkmenistan
  - Türkmenbaşy şäherçesi, formerly Jaňga, a town
- Türkmenbaşy, Turkmenistan, formerly Krasnovodska, a city in Balkan Region
- Saparmyrat Türkmenbaşy, formerly Oktyabrsk, a city in Daşoguz Region
- Saparmyrat Türkmenbaşy, Mary, formerly Energetika, a town in Mary Region

== Other uses ==
- Türkmenbaşy International Airport, serving the city of Türkmenbaşy, Turkmenistan
- Türkmenbaşy International Seaport, the main passenger harbour and cargo port in Türkmenbaşy, Turkmenistan
- Türkmenbaşı Nature Park, a protected area in Istanbul, Turkey

== See also ==
- Turkmen (disambiguation)
- Turkmenistan, a country in Central Asia
- Türkmenbaşy Gulf, a bay of the Caspian Sea on the coast of Turkmenistan
- Türkmenbaşy Ruhy Mosque, a mosque in Gypjak neighborhood of Ashgabat, Turkmenistan
- Renaming of Turkmen months and days of week
- Humanitarian Association of World Turkmens
- Main Drama Theater (Ashgabat), formerly Türkmenistanyň Beýik Saparmyrat Türkmenbaşy adyndaky Baş drama teatry
- Military Institute of the Ministry of Defense of Turkmenistan, or Beýik Saparmyrat Türkmenbaşy adyndaky Türkmenistanyň Goranmak ministrliginiň Harby instituty
