= Healthcare in Turkmenistan =

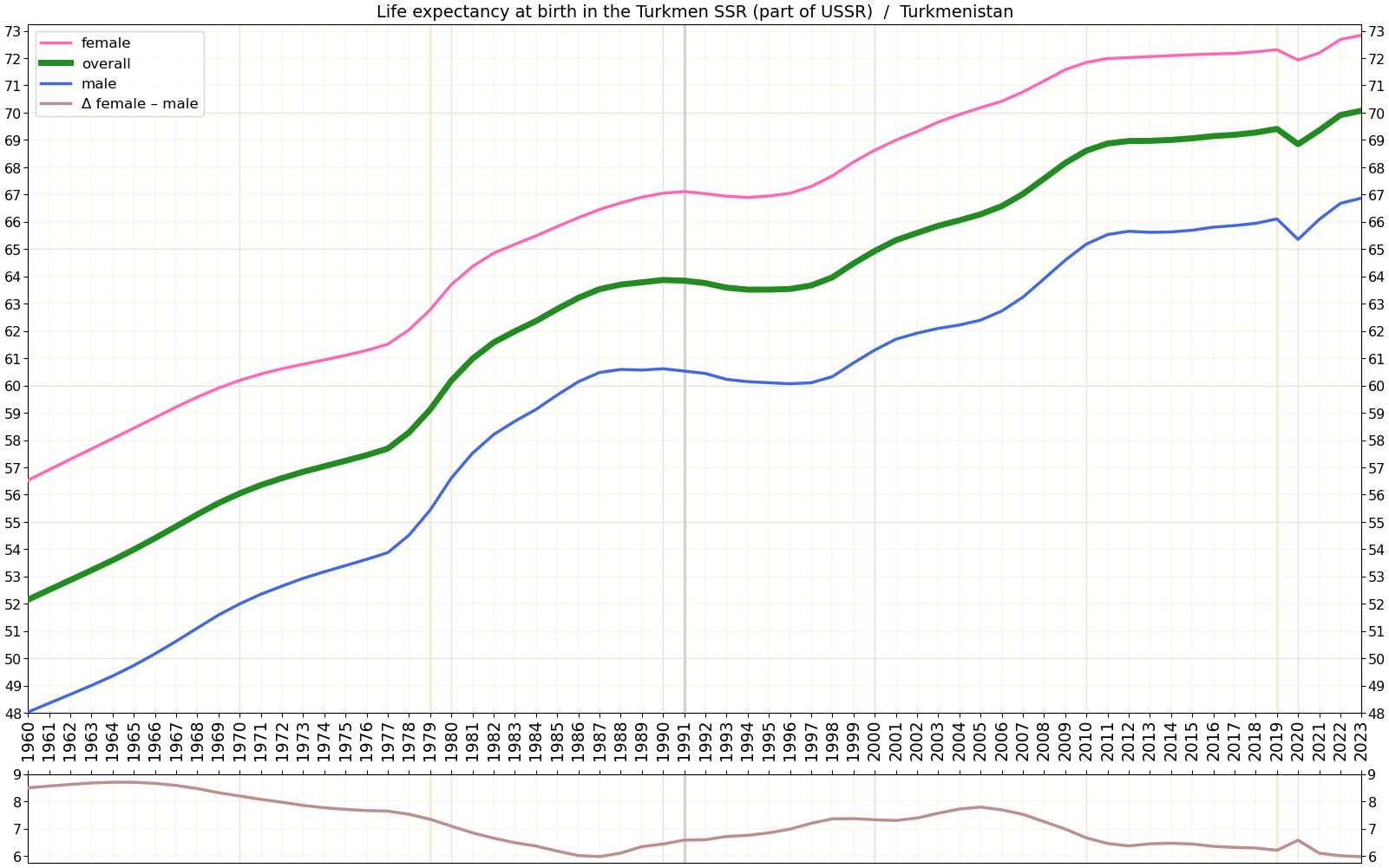
Life expectancy development in Turkmenistan by gender

Healthcare in Turkmenistan encompasses a number of institutions and practices throughout the country of Turkmenistan. In the post-Soviet era, reduced funding has put the health system in poor condition. In 2002 Turkmenistan had 50 hospital beds per 10,000 population, less than half the number in 1996. Overall policy has targeted specialized inpatient facilities to the detriment of basic, outpatient care. Since the late 1990s, many rural facilities have closed, making care available principally in urban areas. President Nyýazow’s 2005 proposal to close all hospitals outside Ashgabat intensified this trend. Physicians are poorly trained, modern medical techniques are rarely used, and medications are in short supply. Doctors and pharmacists were required to study the works of Avicenna and tested on their knowledge of Saparmyrat Nyýazow's spiritual writings, the Ruhnama. In 2004 Nyýazow dismissed 15,000 medical professionals, exacerbating the shortage of personnel. In some cases, professionals have been replaced by military conscripts. Private health care is rare, as the state maintains a near monopoly. Free public health care was abolished in 2004.

Nyýazow's successor, Gurbanguly Berdimuhamedow was a dentist, and took a rather more positive approach to healthcare. Money was invested to modernize the health-care sector, building "gleaming" new medical facilities. He initiated an annual Month of Health and Sports, which involved people throughout the country taking long walks in parks and compulsory physical fitness classes at workplaces. $56 million was spent on an ophthalmology complex in Ashgabat and $47 million in a traumatology centre. The rural hospitals reopened, but they had severe shortages of the most basic medical equipment and hygiene standards were poor. Theoretically the state-funded health insurance covers part of the cost of hospital treatment and medication in public medical facilities, but there are widespread reports of bribery and corruption. There is an acute shortage of clinical staff and political pressure, for example discouraging from diagnoses of HIV .

== Medical tourism ==
There is a considerable flow of medical tourism from patients looking for more reliable health systems. Citizens and residents of Turkmenistan who can afford to go abroad for medical care often engage in medical tourism to Iran, Russia, India, and Turkey.

== See also ==
- Health in Turkmenistan
