= Sona Yazova =

- Born: 1943 (age 82–83)
- Occupation: Short story writer
- Writing career
- Genre: Poetry

Sona Yazova (sometimes Iazova) (born 1943) is a poet from Turkmenistan.

== Biography ==
In 2010 she was named a People's Writer of Turkmenistan by president Gurbanguly Berdimuhamedow as part of the celebrations marking the 19th anniversary of Turkmenistan's independence. She has also been employed by the national television network. In 2008 she was appointed a member of the committee which metes out the Makhtumkuli International Prize. She has been active in literary circles since the late Soviet era, when she was among those invited to present work in poetry readings during perestroika, and has written short fiction in addition to poetry. She was described as a supporter of the regime of Saparmurat Niyazov while he was alive, and at least one of her short stories centers upon an incident in the life of his mother, Gurbansoltan Eje, whose story was central to his personality cult. Patriotism and love of country are among the themes touched upon in her verse.
