= Kipchak =

Kipchak may refer to:

- Kipchaks, a medieval Turkic people
- Kipchak languages, a Turkic language group
- Kipchak language, an extinct Turkic language of the Kipchak group
- Kipchak Khanate or Golden Horde
- Kipchak (Aimaq tribe), a tribe of Kyrgyz origin in Afghanistan
- Desht-i Kipchak

Places referred to as Kipchak:

- Kipchak Mosque, a mosque in the village of Gypjak, Turkmenistan
- Kipchak (village), former village now part of Ashgabat in Turkmenistan
- Kıpçak, Gagauzia, commune in Gagauzia
- Kıpçak, Lice, village in Turkey
- Qıpçaq, village and municipality in the Qakh Rayon of Azerbaijan
- Qipchoq (Tashkent Metro), Tashkent Metro station, Tajikistan
- Qepchaq (disambiguation), places in Iran
