= List of banks in Turkmenistan =

This is a list of banks in Turkmenistan.

== Central bank ==
- Central Bank of Turkmenistan

== Commercial banks ==
- Dayhanbank (Agricultural Bank), Asgabat (state bank)
- HalkBank SCB, Ashgabat (state bank) http://www.halkbank.gov.tm/
- Garagum IJSB, Asgabat
- Prezidentbank, Asgabat
- Rysgal JSCB, Asgabat
- Senagat JSCB, Asgabat
- The State Bank for Foreign Economic Affairs of Turkmenistan, Asgabat (state bank)
- The State Development Bank of Turkmenistan
- Turkmenbashybank, Asgabat (state bank)
- Turkmenistanbank, Asgabat (state bank)
- Turkmen-Turkish Bank JSCB, Asgabat
