= Copceac =

Copceac may refer to:

- Copceac, Gagauzia, a commune in Gagauzia, Moldova
- Copceac, Ştefan Vodă, a commune in Ştefan Vodă district, Moldova

== See also ==
- Kipchak (disambiguation)
