= Melon production in Turkmenistan =

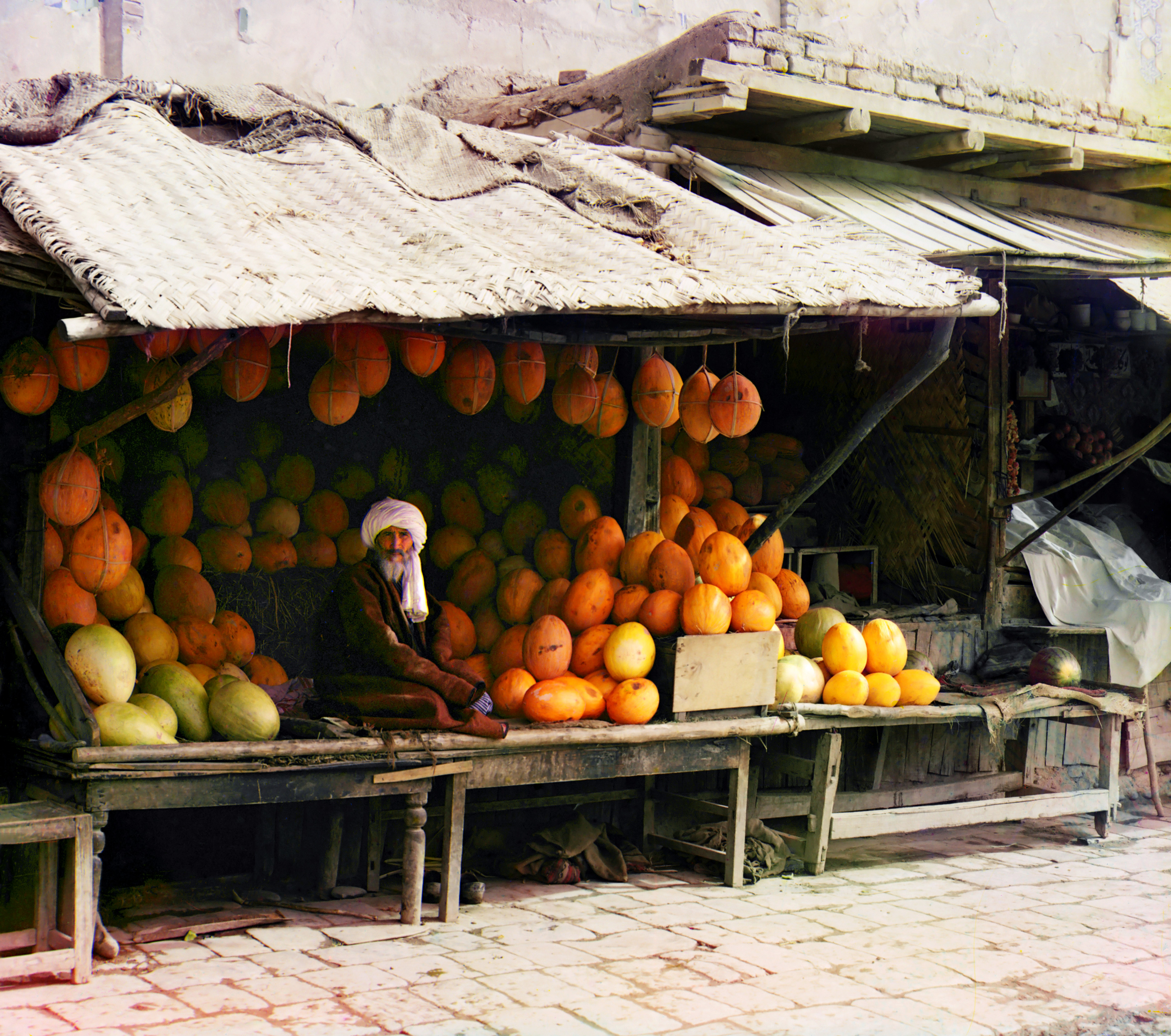
Melons in Samarkand across the border in Uzbekistan

Melon production in Turkmenistan contributes to the national economy. It has been important to agricultural production in the country for centuries and in the Middle Ages was praised as a "miracle" crop. In 1992 some 26,069 hectares were under cultivation. Turkmenistan has hosted an annual Melon Day since 1994 to celebrate Melon culture in the country. Held in the autumn, melons "are brought into Ashgabad by soldiers and the people can eat as many melons as they like." Production in the country has been affected by pests such as the whitefly.
