= Ogulgerek Berdimuhamedowa =

First Lady of Turkmenistan from 2007 to 2022

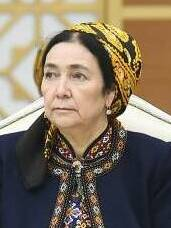
- Berdimuhamedowa in 2022

First Lady of Turkmenistan
- In role 14 February 2007 – 19 March 2022; Acting: 21 December 2006 – 14 February 2007
- Preceded by: Muza Nyýazowa
- Succeeded by: Ogulgerek Berdimuhamedova

Personal details
- Born: c. 1957 (age 68–69) Turkmen SSR, Soviet Union
- Spouse: Gurbanguly Berdimuhamedow
- Children: 3, including Serdar

Ogulgerek Ataevna Berdimuhamedova (Note: Turkmen: Огулгере́к Ата́евна Бердымухаме́дова, Russian: Огулгерек Атаевна Бердымухамедова, romanized: Ogulgerek Ataýewna Berdimuhamedowa) (born c. 1957) is the wife of former President of Turkmenistan Gurbanguly Berdimuhamedow and the mother of his successor, Serdar Berdimuhamedow.

== Biography ==
There is virtually no information about Ogulgerek Berdimuhamedova in publicly available sources. She is presumably around the same age as her husband, who was born in 1957. According to diplomatic documents published by WikiLeaks, she holds extremely conservative and traditionalist views. She rarely appears in public and only alongside her husband. When she does appear, video operators, photographers and journalists are prohibited from taking or publishing photographs of her. Until recently, no photographs of Berdimuhamedova were available on the Internet. The first photograph appeared in November 2021, during a visit to Turkmenistan by Turkish President Recep Tayyip Erdoğan and his wife, Emine Erdoğan, when a joint photograph of the two presidential couples was taken and subsequently published in the Turkish media. According to some unconfirmed reports, Ogulgerek Berdimuhamedova has lived outside Turkmenistan since 2007, reportedly in London with one of her daughters. She is reportedly excluded from participation in politics.

Ogulgerek Berdimuhamedova has three children: one son and two daughters. Her son, Serdar, was born in 1981; the birth dates of her daughters, Guljahan and Gulshan, are unknown. The former is married to a certain Ilyasgeldy (or Ilasgeldy) Amanov, a representative of the Turkmen State Agency for Management and Use of Hydrocarbon Resources in London. The latter lives in France with her husband, reportedly named Derya Atabaev, who works at the Turkmenistan Embassy in Paris. Ogulgerek Ataevna has at least one grandson, Kerimguly (presumably Guljahan's son), who frequently appears in public alongside his grandfather.

On 30 May 2022, she was awarded the title of "Honoured Carpet Weaver of Turkmenistan".
