= GATM =

GATM may refer to:

- GATM (gene)
- Global air-traffic management
- Humanitarian Association of World Turkmens
