= Health in Turkmenistan =

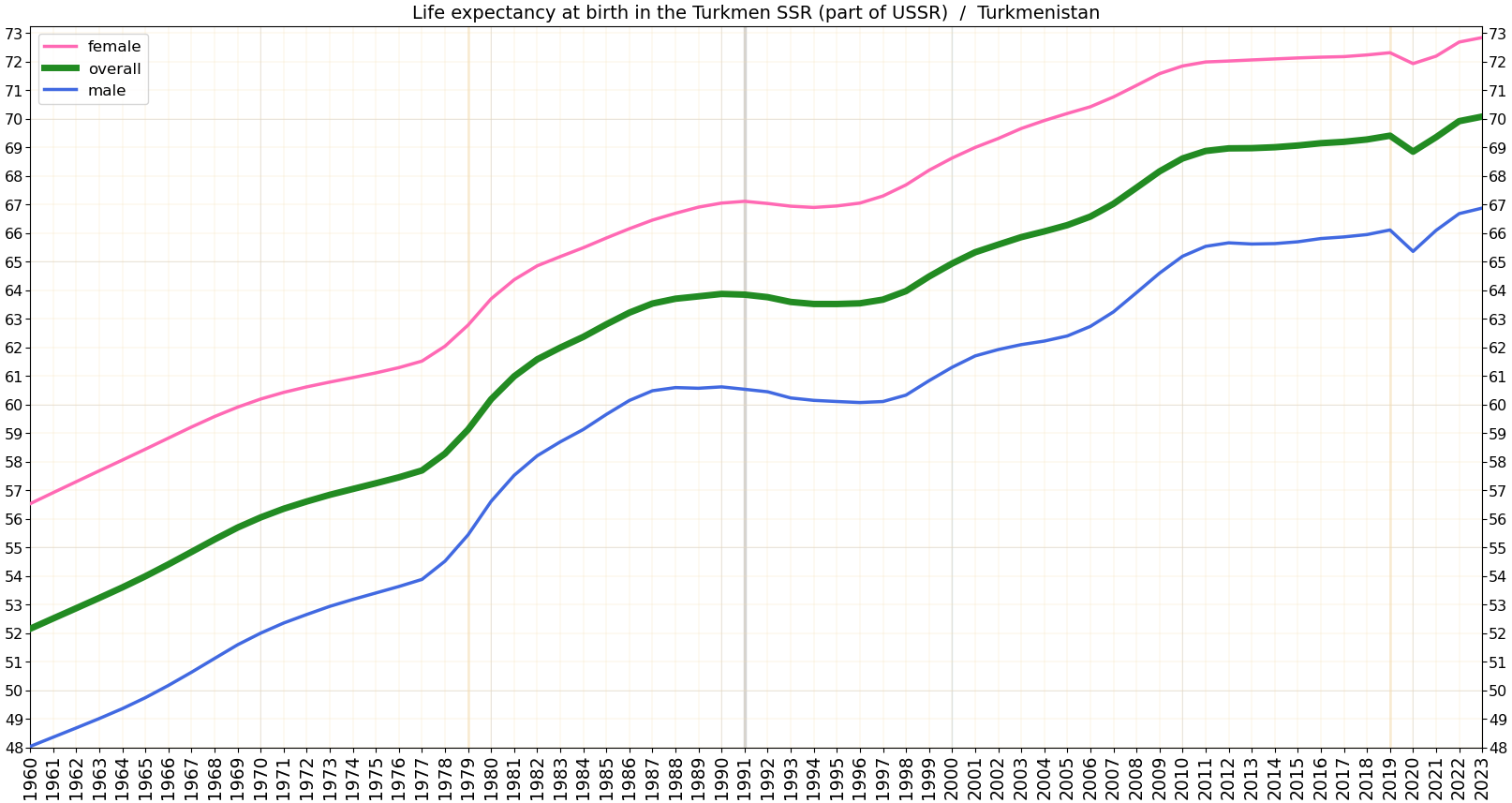
Life expectancy at birth in Turkmenistan

The Human Rights Measurement Initiative finds that Turkmenistan is fulfilling 74.9% of what it should be fulfilling for the right to health based on its level of income.

In 2016, life expectancy for males in Turkmenistan was 65 and for females 72 years.

The most common causes of death in Turkmenistan are cardiovascular disease, cancer, and respiratory disease. Major health factors are poor diet, polluted drinking water, and the industrial and agricultural pollutants that are especially concentrated in the northeastern areas near the Amu Darya River and the Aral Sea. The reported occurrence of human immunodeficiency virus (HIV) has been less than 0.1 percent. However, sharp increases in drug trafficking through Turkmenistan are likely to increase that figure substantially.

President Saparmurat Niyazov constructed the Walk of Health, a 36 kilometre concrete stairway running along the Kopet Dag mountains, which was intended to improve the health of citizens. All ministers, members of parliament and civil servants were ordered to walk the length of it once a year.

The sale of tobacco products in the country was banned by president Gurbanguly Berdymukhamedow in January 2016. A fine of 6,900 manats is imposed on any shop selling cigarettes. Atadurd Odmanov, the head of the State Service for Protecting the Security of a Healthy Society, was earlier stripped of the rank of Colonel because of his failure to persuade smokers to quit.

== See also ==
- Healthcare in Turkmenistan
