= Ashgabat Watersports Complex =

Public aquatic sports facility in London, England

Turkmenbashi Olympic Watersports Complex Turkmen: Türkmenbaşynyň Olimpiýa Suw-Sport Toplumy
- Ashgabat Watersports Complex
- Interactive map of Turkmenbashi Olympic Watersports Complex; Turkmen: Türkmenbaşynyň Olimpiýa Suw-Sport Toplumy
- Location: Garaşsyzlyk şaýoly 74; Ashgabat; Turkmenistan
- Capacity: 1741

Construction
- Built: 8 December 2006
- Cost: 25$ million
- General contractor: GAP İnşaat

Website
- Official website

Turkmenbashi Olympic Watersports Complex or Ashgabat Watersports Complex (Turkmen: Türkmenbaşynyň Olimpiýa Suw-Sport Toplumy) is an indoor sports facility accommodating the 50-meter (164-foot) swimming pool. It is located in Ashgabat, Turkmenistan.

The white-marble building with blue stained-glass windows was constructed at the intersection of Garyşsyzlyk Avenue and Oguzkhan Street between 2004 and 2006.

== History ==
April 12, 2004, Turkmenistan President Saparmurat Niyazov signed a decree according to which the State Committee for Tourism and Sport of Turkmenistan was authorized to sign a contract with the Turkish company "Gap Insaat." Construction of Ashgabat Watersports Complex was worth $25 million, and an area 18.0 thousand square meters. There is an area landscaping adjacent to the facility that is 12.0 thousand square meters.

Construction started in May 2004.

On December 8, 2006, the complex was inaugurated, with the participation of President Saparmurat Niyazov.

== Facilities ==
The Ashgabat Watersports Complex is a white marble building with huge blue stained-glass windows. It is located at the intersection of Garashsyzlyk avenue and Oguzkhan street in Ashgabat, Turkmenistan. The campus consists of three interconnected buildings with a total area of 30,000 square meters, which also houses a parking lot for 90 vehicles and a service center.

Block "A" has a 1700-seat grandstand and a large water scene with a 50-meter swimming pool with 8 lanes, which can be transformed into two 25-meter pool for competition swimmers to short course. At the bottom of the pool, there are video cameras, and the hall is equipped with special music and light equipment. For divers in the water, there is a separate pool with diving boards and towers, equipped with an elevator.

The main building complex has facilities for recreation athletes, classes for theoretical studies, referee rooms, massage rooms, saunas, changing rooms for athletes and walk-in closets for spectators. The building also houses the press center, cafes, bars and dining room for 200 people .

The two-storey block of "B" placed physical training hall, the administration of water- sports complex and economic services .

The third block of the complex is equipped with a water park that has a 25-meter swimming pool and a shallow pool for children, equipped with the slides.

The building houses:

- Large swimming pool measuring 50x25 meters and 3 meters deep. The large swimming pool is equipped with the capability to record underwater footage using cameras.
- Diving pool measuring 15x25 meters and 5 meters deep
- Water park measuring 12.70x25 meters
- Children's pool measuring 12.40x14.40 meters and 80 cm deep

Special rooms, technical areas, and storage spaces have been provided for specialists and judges of the Turkmenistan Water Sports Federation.
