= Atamyrat Nyýazow =

Soviet soldier (1912–1942)

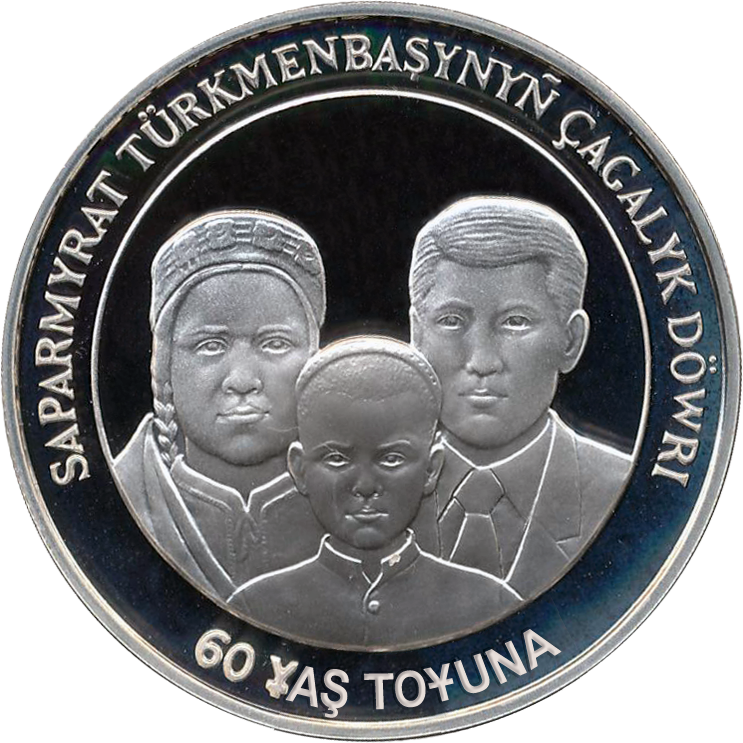
- A group photo of Nyýazow, his wife and son.
- Born: 1912; Gypjak
- Died: 24 December 1942 (aged 29–30); Chikola, RSFSR, Soviet Union
- Resting place: Khaznidon
- Occupations: Teacher, soldier
- Children: 3 including Saparmurat Niyazov
- Awards: Hero of Turkmenistan
- Military career
- Conflicts: World War II; Battle of the Caucasus †

Atamyrat Nyýazow (Note: Also known by his name transliterated from Russian, Atamyrat Niyazov (Russian: Атамурат Ниязов)) (1912 – 24 December 1942) was a soldier in the Red Army during World War II from the Soviet Republic of Turkmenistan who was the father of the first post-Soviet president of Turkmenistan, Saparmyrat Nyýazow (commonly known as "Türkmenbaşy"). He was also a school teacher and a financial officer.

== Biography ==
According to the official version of his biography, he was born in the village of Kipchak, Ashkhabad District (later the Derweze District of Ahal Region, and subsequently annexed by the city of Ashgabat) in 1912. He was the eldest son in the family. He was fluent in Arabic, Russian, and Latin. In the late 1920s and early 1930s, he served in the Turkmen cavalry regiment in the village of Keshi (now a neighbourhood of Ashgabat). He took an active part in the work to eliminate the illiteracy of the population. In 1932, he successfully completed a three-month training course for elementary school teachers at the Ashgabat Pedagogical Institute, and was sent to the Kerki District (in what is now the Lebap Region), where for three years he worked as an elementary school teacher in the villages of Chekir and Dashlyk.

After this, he entered the Ashgabat Accounting and Finance College for the Department of Planning and Accounting. He actively participated in public life, being elected as a delegate to the Republican Student Conference. After graduating from college with honours, he worked in the financial authorities of Kerki, Tashauz, Bäherden, Geoktepe, Ashgabat. In 1937, he married Gurbansoltan Eje, after which they moved to Ashgabat, where they bought a small house. Three sons appeared in the family: Niyazmurat (1938–1948), Saparmurat (1940–2006) and Muhammetmyrat (1942–1948).

== Death ==
In August 1941, he volunteered to go to the front during World War II as part of the 535th Rifle Regiment of the 127th Rifle Division, later to become the 2nd Guards Rifle Division. He was killed on 24 December 1942 during the Battle of the Caucasus in which German forces tried to invade the USSR through the Caucasus. He was killed near an Ossetian village after being surrounded by the enemy and was shot by troops of the German Wehrmacht. He was buried in a mass grave in the village of Haznidon in North Ossetia. According to the fragmentary information from surviving soldiers, the unit in which he served was surrounded, with the soldiers engaging in a long night raid. In 2004, the soil from the grave was moved to his hometown of Kipchak. His wife, two of his sons, and other members of his family were killed in the 1948 Ashgabat earthquake six years later that caused extreme damage to the city. He was part of the cult of personality of his surviving son later.

== Honours ==
Several places and institutions were named after Nyýazow as well as honour him:

- In 2000, he and other veterans were posthumously made Heroes of Turkmenistan. Just 6 years prior, he was awarded the honorary title of Hero of Turkmenistan.
- He was also made a recipient of the Ukrainian Order of Prince Yaroslav the Wise.
- 2004 was declared by the Assembly of Turkmenistan to be the "Year of Atamyrat Nyýazow".
- Atamyrat Nyýazow Avenue is located in the capital of Ashgabat and has buildings such as Halk Bank on it.
- Atamyrat was the former name given for the city of Kerki. In 1999, the city was renamed Atamyrat by president Nyýazow. In November 2017 the name was changed back to Kerki by president Gurbanguly Berdimuhamedow.
- A division of the Turkmen Ground Forces was renamed in 2004 after Nyýazow. Today the 22nd Motor Rifle Division "Atamyrat Niyazov" holds his name.
- A secondary school in the capital is named after him.
