= 344th Division =

344th Division may refer to:

- 344th Infantry Division (Wehrmacht), Germany
- 344th Division (Imperial Japanese Army)
- 344th Rifle Division, Soviet Union

== See also ==
- List of military divisions by number
