= Magtymguly Pyragy Cultural Park Complex =

Park to turkmen poet

- Interactive map of Magtymguly Pyragy Cultural Park Complex
- Location: Ashgabat, Turkmenistan
- Coordinates: 37.8854°N 58.2444°E
- Area: 41 hectares (100 acres)
- Open: 2024
- Public transit: Ashgabat bus №35 and №20

Monument to Magtymguly Pyragy
- Interactive map of Monument to Magtymguly Pyragy
- Location: Ashgabat (Turkmenistan)
- Coordinates: 37°53′06″N 58°14′34″E
- Designer: Saragt Babayev
- Material: bronze
- Height: 60 metres (200 ft) (sculpture); 25 metres (82 ft) (base)
- Beginning date: 2022
- Completion date: 2024
- Opening date: 17 May 2024
- Dedicated to: Magtymguly Pyragy

Magtymguly Pyragy Cultural Park Complex (Turkmen: Magtymguly Pyragy» medeni-seýilgäh toplumy) is a park complex located in the Büzmeýin District of Ashgabat, on Archabil Avenue. Opened in 2024, the park was named after a poet Magtymguly Pyragy. The cultural and park complex covers an area of more than 41 hectares.

== History ==
The Russian construction company Vozrozhdenie served as the general contractor for the Magtymguly Pyragy Cultural Park Complex from 2022. Approximately 80,000 square meters of granite were used in the construction of the park. The main types of products include: facing tiles (approximately 31,000 m²), steps (about 6,000 units), risers (around 13,000 units), parapets (approximately 800 units), planters (17 units), pedestals (13 units), and decorative elements (88 units).

A park complex dedicated to Magtymguly Pyragy, the national poet and philosopher of Turkmenistan, was inaugurated on May 17, 2024. The park is located on the southern outskirts of Ashgabat, at the foot of the Kopetdag mountain range, near the Walk of Health.

The Magtymguly Pyragy Cultural Park Complex features 24 statues of poets and philosophers from around the world: Sayat-Nova, Yanka Kupala, Du Fu, Honoré de Balzac, Shota Rustaveli, Johann Wolfgang von Goethe, Rabindranath Tagore, Yasunari Kawabata, Raja Ali Haji, Mihai Eminescu, Saido Nasafi, William Shakespeare, Sándor Petőfi, Hafez Shirazi, Dante Alighieri, Kurmangazy Sagyrbayuly, Chingiz Aitmatov, Adam Mickiewicz, Fyodor Mikhailovich Dostoevsky, Juan Ramón Jiménez, Yunus Emre, Hryhorii Skovoroda, Langston Hughes, and Alisher Navoi. These sculptures are made of bronze and stand 3.5 meters tall.

== Magtymguly Pyragy statue ==
The park features a monument to Magtymguly Pyragy statue. The Magtymguly Pyragy statue in the park is 60 meters high. It was created by the honored artist and master sculptor of Turkmenistan Saragt Babayev. The height of the pedestal is 25 meters. This is one of the largest statues in Central Asia.

To immortalize the image of Magtymguly Pyragy required more than a thousand tons of bronze. The construction primarily used gray granite from the Vozrozhdenie quarry. Red granite for the base of the Magtymguly Pyragy statue was sourced from the Kalguaara quarry, while black granite was utilized from the Kamenogorsk and Ala-Noskua quarries. The project took a year and a half to complete, with Russian architects involved in its design and development. The pedestal is engraved with the Magtymguly Pyragy famous lines from the poem "The Future of Turkmenistan."
