= Muza Nyýazowa =

First Lady of Turkemenistan from 1990 to 2006

- Муза Ниязова

First Lady of Turkmenistan
- In role 2 November 1990 – 21 December 2006
- Preceded by: Position created
- Succeeded by: Ogulgerek Berdimuhamedowa

Personal details
- Born: Muza Alekseevna Melnikova; 10 June 1938 (age 88) Leningrad, Russian SFSR, Soviet Union
- Spouse: Saparmyrat Nyýazow (m. 1967; died 2006)
- Children: 2

Muza Alekseýewna Nyýazowa (née Melnikova; born 10 June 1938) is a Turkmen public figure who held the role of First Lady of Turkmenistan from 1991 until the death of her husband in 2006. She is the widow of the first president of Turkmenistan, Saparmyrat Nyýazow, with whom she had two children.

== Biography ==
Muza Melnikova was born in Leningrad into a family of Russian and Jewish origin. Her father fought in World War II and was a senior officer in Soviet Army. She graduated from the Leningrad Polytechnic Institute. In the mid-1960s, she met and married Saparmyrat Nyýazow, who at that time worked at the Kirov plant as a molder and was studying at the institute. On 18 April 1967, Nyýazowa gave birth to a son, Myrat, and two years later to their daughter, Irina.

== Wife to Nyýazow ==
It was understood that when Nyýazow was appointed in 1985 as First Secretary of the Central Committee of the Communist Party of Turkmenistan, Nyýazowa's nationality played a decisive role, as members of the Politburo considered that it would limit Turkmen nationalism. Following the collapse of the Soviet government and the 1990 Turkmenistan presidential election, Nyýazow distanced himself from Muza, as he did not care to become an example of interethnic marriages in a position of power. In Nyýazowa's later years, she spent most of her time between Moscow (where she has an apartment on Prospekt Vernadskogo) and London.
