= First Lady of Turkmenistan =

Spouse of the President of Turkmenistan

- Türkmenistanyň birinji hanymy
- Incumbent; Unknown (wife of Serdar Berdimuhamedow)
- Residence: Oguzkhan Presidential Palace
- Seat: Ashgabat
- Precursor: First Lady of the Turkmen SSR
- Inaugural holder: Muza Niyazova
- Formation: 2 November 1990

The First Lady of Turkmenistan (Turkmen: Türkmenistanyň birinji hanymy) is the title attributed to the wife of the President of Turkmenistan.

== First ladies of Turkmenistan ==
=== Muza Niyazova ===
Muza Alekseýewna Niýazowa is the widow of the first president, Saparmurat Niyazov, with whom she had two children. An ethnic Russian, her husband distanced himself from her as he did not care to become an example of interethnic marriages in a position of power.

=== Ogulgerek Berdimuhamedowa ===
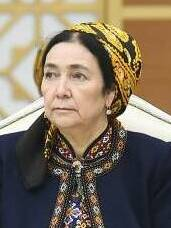
Ogulgerek Berdimuhamedowa in 2022

Ogulgerek Atayewna Berdimuhamedowa was the wife of the 2nd president Gurbanguly Berdimuhamedow. In 2021, during the visit of President of Turkey Recep Tayyip Erdoğan, the first official photo of the Berdimuhamedova was taken. On 30 May 2022, Ogulgerek Berdimuhamedova was awarded the title of "Honored Carpet Weaver of Turkmenistan" for her many years at the carpet factory in the city of Gökdepe.

=== Serdar Berdimuhamedov's wife ===
Serdar Berdimuhamedow has been married since 2001. Nothing is known about the name and biography of his wife, but there are rumors according to which, like his mother, his wife is also named Ogulgerek.
