= Walk of Health =

Hiking trail in Turkmenistan

Coordinates: 37°53′33″N 58°14′29″E

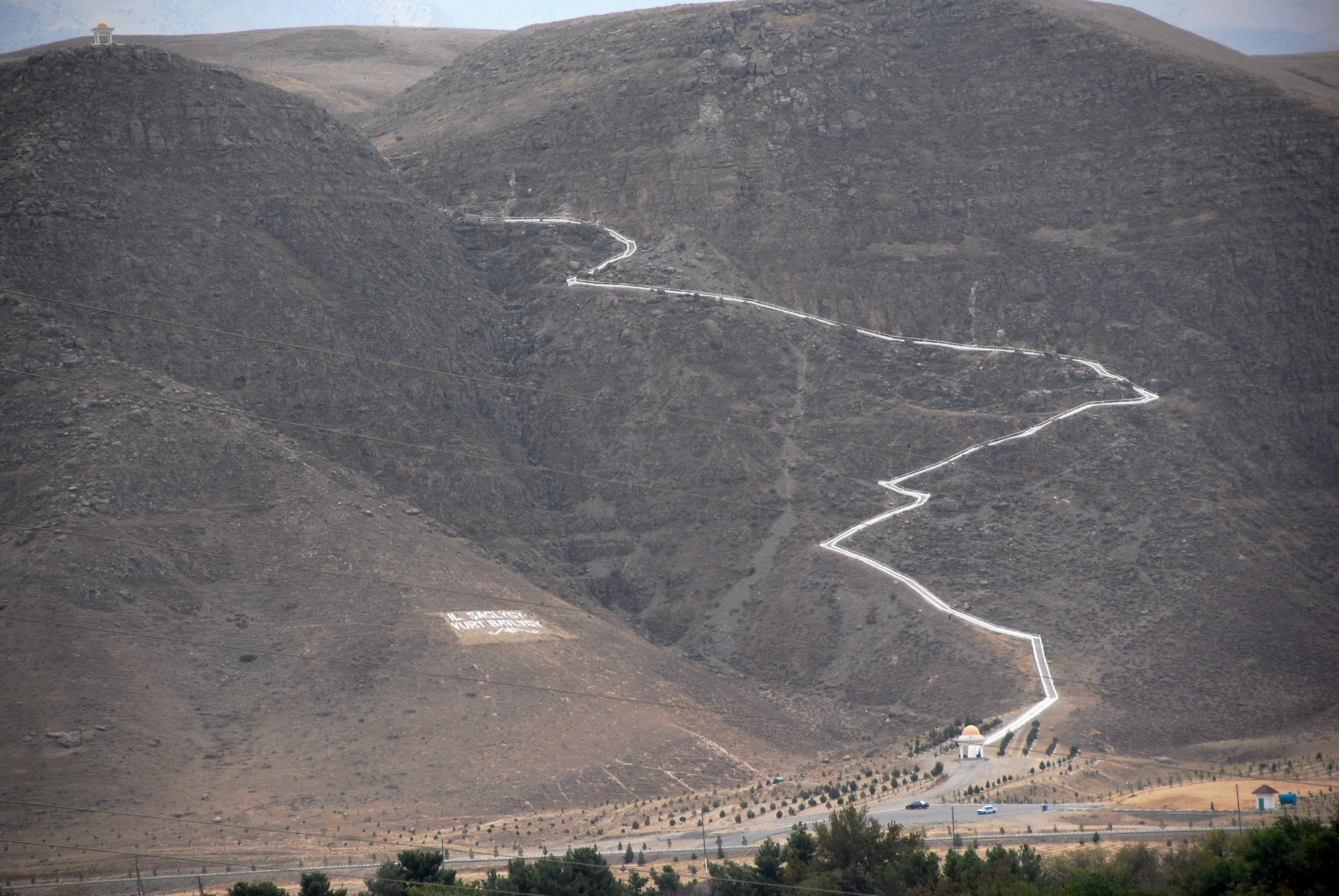
- View of the Walk of Health, 2008
- Length: 36 km (22 mi)
- Location: Ashgabat, Turkmenistan
- Established: 2 January 2000
- Began construction: 1999
- Completed: mid-2000
- Use: Hiking
- Highest point: 1,293 m (4,242 ft)
- Lowest point: 228 m (748 ft)
- Surface: Concrete
- Maintainer: Government of Turkmenistan

The Walk of Health (Turkmen: Saglyk ýoly, lit. 'health trail') is a 36-kilometre (22 mi) (Note: According to Slate, the Walk of Health has a length of 45 kilometres (28 mi).) long concrete walkway that runs alongside the Kopet Dag mountain range in southern Ashgabat, Turkmenistan, near the Iran–Turkmenistan border. The first 8 km (5.0 mi) of the path was constructed in 1999 by dictator Saparmurat Niyazov, with the intent of encouraging citizens to be healthy. It officially opened on 2 January 2000. Until Niyazov's death in 2006, he required his ministers to walk the entire length of the walkway once every year.

== History ==
The first 8 km (5.0 mi) of the Walk of Health was constructed in 1999 by President of Turkmenistan Saparmurat Niyazov. It officially opened on 2 January 2000; Niyazov made his ministers walk the walkway whilst he travelled by helicopter to meet them at the end of the route, as feared that his own heart condition would render him unable to walk the entire length. The walkway was expanded an additional 26 km (16 mi) in mid-2000, after which Niyazov announced he would require his ministers to walk the entire length once every year; this policy lasted until his death in 2006. On 30 August 2004, over 10,000 people walked the walkway, including members of the government.

In July 2012, President Gurbanguly Berdimuhamedow expressed dissatisfaction with the state of the walkway. He said that the government would look for private investors to maintain it.

== Route ==
The concrete walkway is split into two sections: Leader's Trail, which is 8 km (5.0 mi) long, and Serdar Trail, which is 28 km (17 mi). The beginning of the Walk of Health is marked by an archway in Serdar Health Park. From their starting points, Leader's Trail runs northwest, terminating at the Kopetdag Highway south of Nisa, while Serdar Trail runs generally southeast, terminating at the Government Tribune complex on Gokdepe Highway south of Ashgabat. As there are no trees in the mountain range to provide shade, the walkway is difficult to walk in its entirety. It is accompanied by metal fences on either side of the path, as well as street lamps so that it can be illuminated at night. Numerous statues and sculptures line the walkway, with pavilions every kilometer for resting. The highest point of the walkway reaches 1,293-metre (4,242 ft), which is marked by a flagpole displaying the flag of Turkmenistan.

== Park ==
On May 17, 2024, near the Walk of Health, the Magtymguly Pyragy Cultural Park Complex and a monument dedicated to the 18th-century Turkmen poet and Sufi spiritual leader Magtymguly Pyragy were inaugurated, commemorating the 300th anniversary of the poet's birth. The park complex is located in the southern part of Ashgabat, near the Walk of Health, with its centerpiece being the monument to Pyragy. The bronze statue of Pyragy stands 60 metres (200 ft) tall, with a pedestal diameter of 25 metres (82 ft). Surrounding the monument are bronze sculptures of several renowned foreign literary figures and notable individuals, each standing 3.5 metres (11 ft) tall.

== Gallery ==
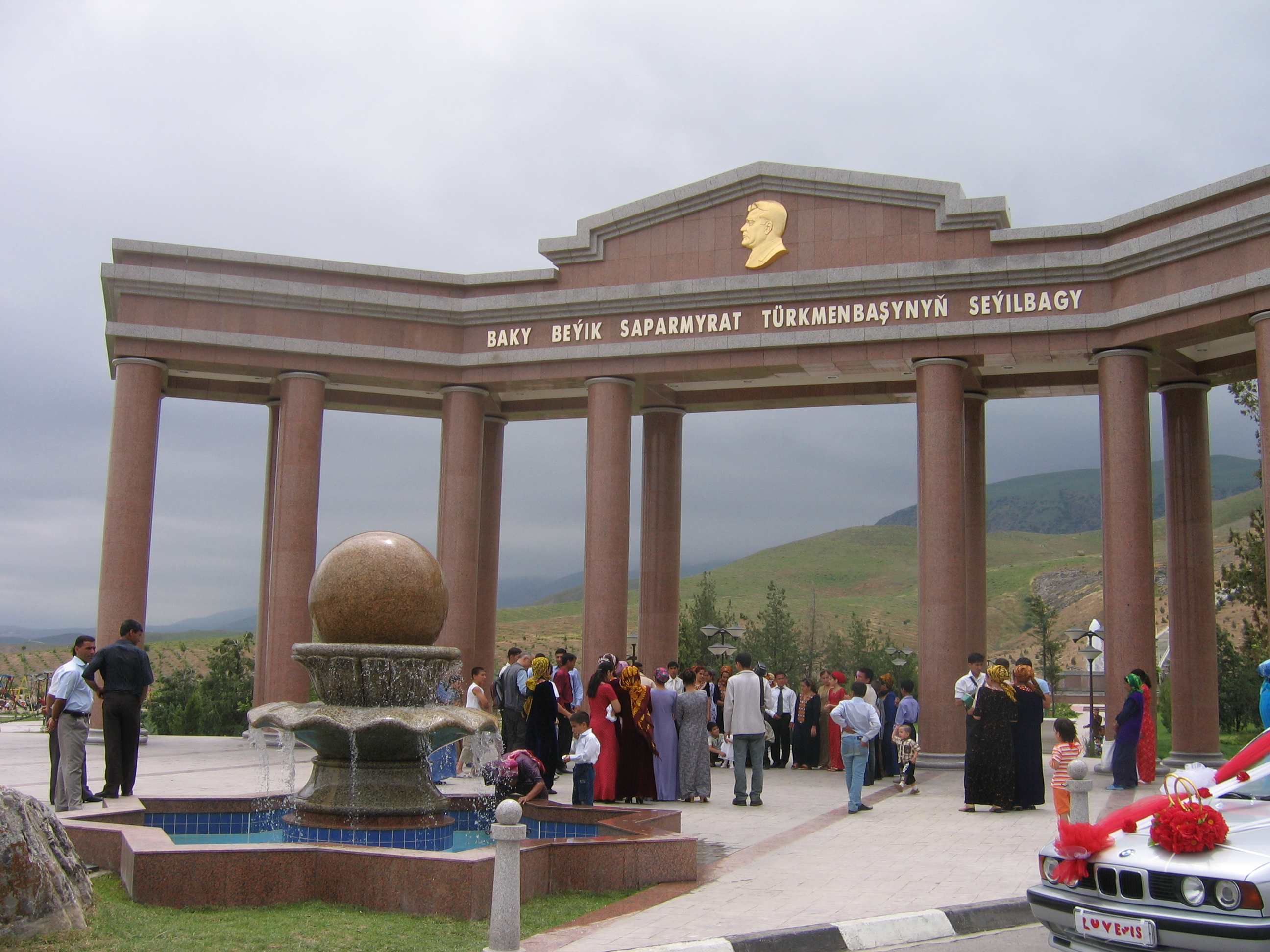
Archway at the entrance to the walkway

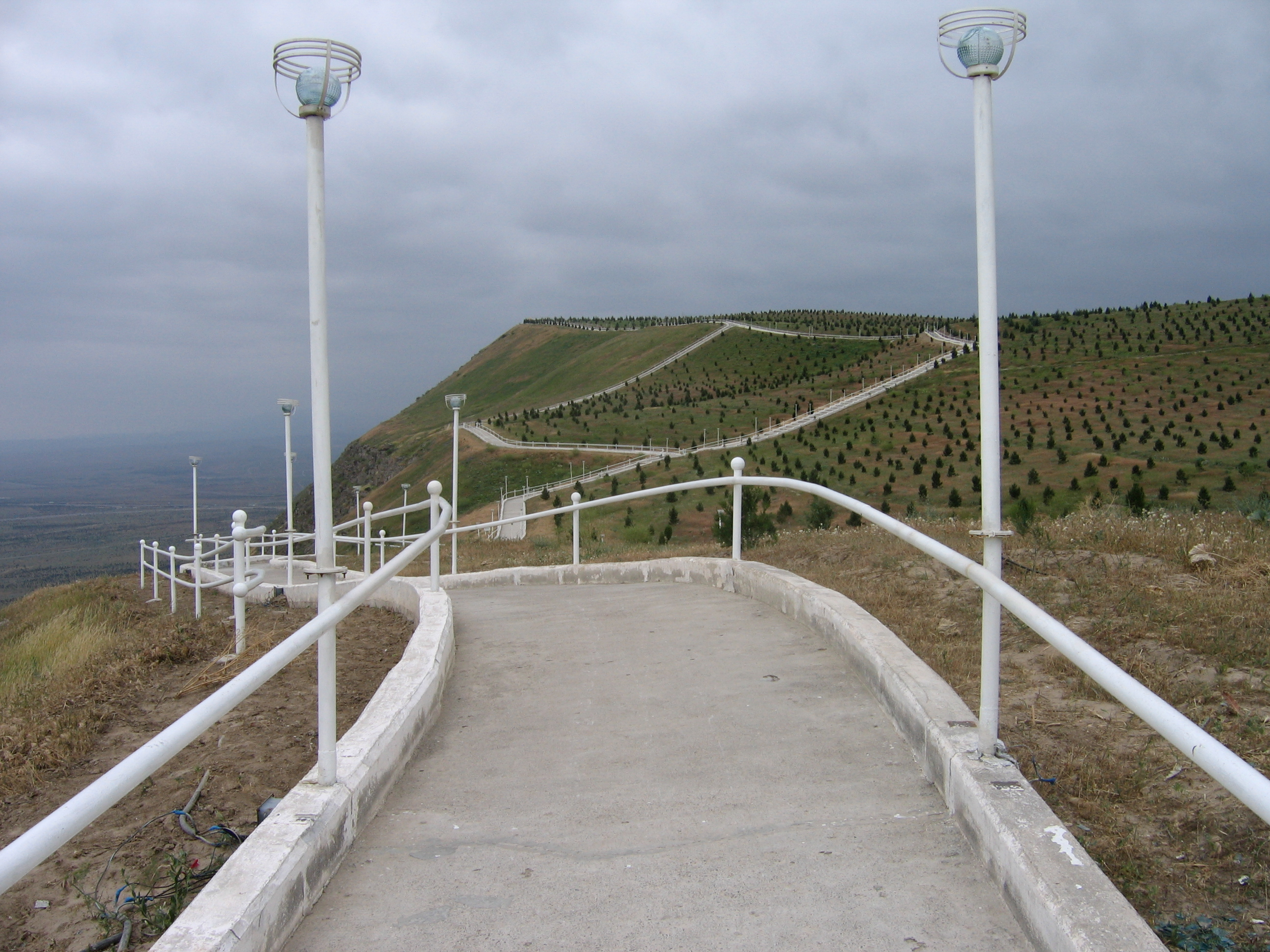
View of the walkway

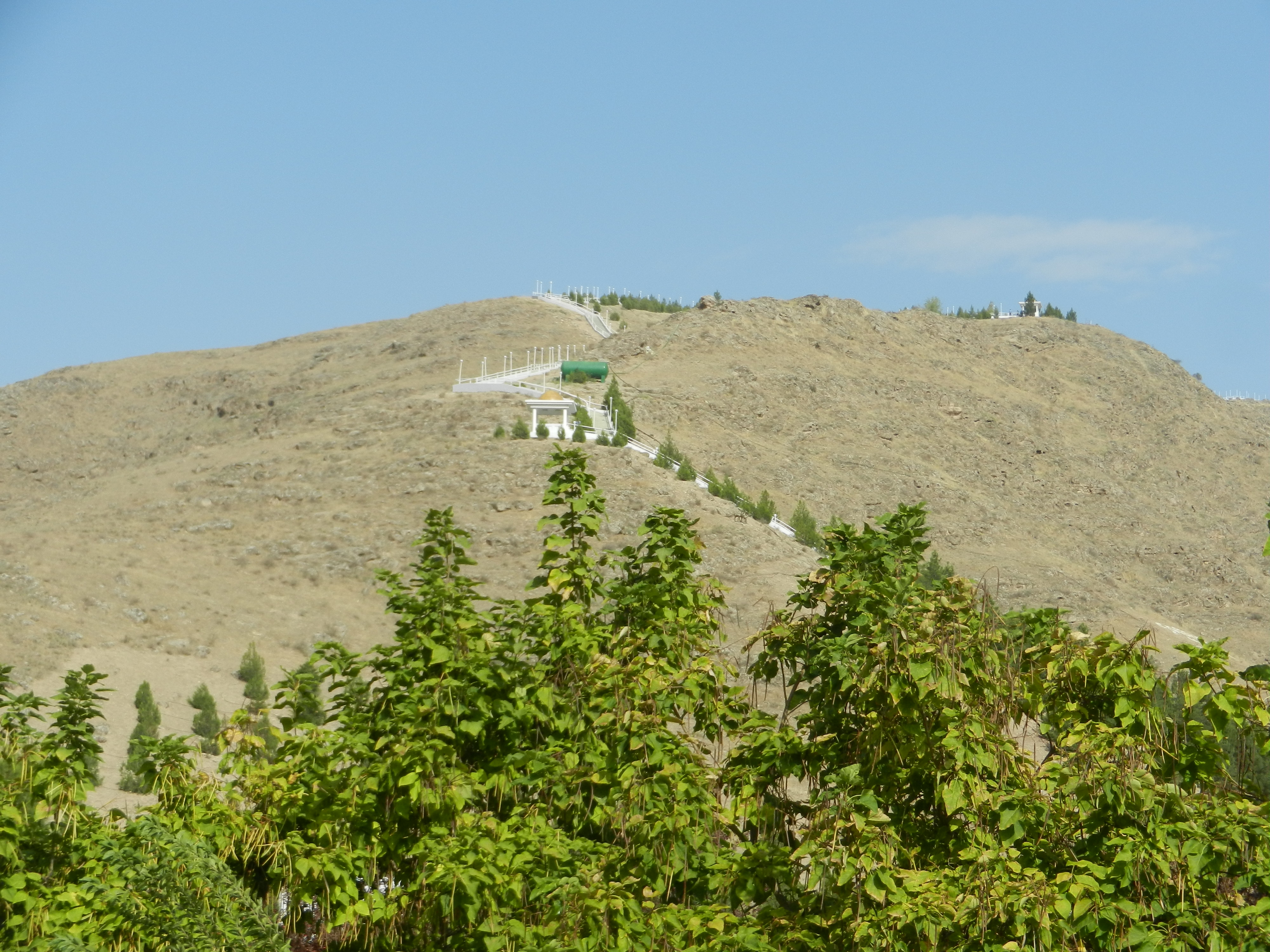
Another view of the walkway
