= Gurbanmyrat Ataýew =

Turkmenistan politician

Gurbanmyrat (Amandurdyýewiç) Ataýew (born 1965) has served as the Oil and Gas Minister in the Government of Turkmenistan since Turkmenbashi Saparmurat Niyazov appointed him on 16 December 2005. Ataýew replaced Atamurad Berdyev, who became the Minister of Economy and Finance.

When Niyazov appointed him on state-owned television, he told Ataýew, "Learn English. In six months, you must have learned it."

In 2007, Ataýew was made minister of Mineral Resources in addition to his previous responsibilities, for a probation period of six months.
