= Renaming of Turkmen months and days of week =

On 10 August 2002, the government of Turkmenistan adopted a law to rename all the months and most of the days of the week. The names were chosen according to Turkmen national symbols, as described in the Ruhnama, a book written by Saparmurat Niyazov, Turkmenistan's first and only president for life. According to Arto Halonen's documentary film The Shadow of the Holy Book, Turkish businessman Ahmet Çalık came up with the idea to rename the months, as he was trying to befriend Niyazov to expand his business in the country.

After the law was passed, the new names were used in all Turkmen state-owned media. Publications in languages other than Turkmen often used the new names too, especially those that were targeted at Russian-speaking citizens of Turkmenistan, with the old name sometimes written in brackets. The old month names were still used in popular speech, however.

Four years after the change, Niyazov died in 2006. On 23 April 2008, it was reported that the cabinet of ministers of Turkmenistan discussed restoring the old names of the months and weekdays. The old names were restored in July 2008.

The original Roman calendar month names were borrowed from Russian, itself derived from Latin. The adopted Turkmen month names were as follows:

English name	Old Turkmen name	Adopted Turkmen name	Explanation
January	Ýanwar	Türkmenbaşy	Meaning "The Leader of Turkmen", the adopted name of Saparmurat Niyazov, president of Turkmenistan and author of the Ruhnama.
February	Fewral	Baýdak	Flag – the Turkmenistan flag day is celebrated in February on Niyazov's birthday.
March	Mart	Nowruz	The traditional Persian New Year, which is celebrated in March.
April	Aprel	Gurbansoltan	Gurbansoltan Eje – The name of Niyazov's mother, who was possibly born in that month.
May	Maý	Magtymguly	Magtymguly Pyragy – Turkmen poet, considered by Niyazov as one of the greatest spiritual teachers of the Turkmen people.
June	Iýun	Oguz	Oguz Khan – the legendary and semi-mythological founder of the Turkmen nation, first recorded in the 13th century (see Oghuz).
July	Iýul	Gorkut	The hero of the "Gorkut-Ata" Turkmen epic.
August	Awgust	Alp Arslan	The second leader of the Seljuk Empire, fought a war with the Byzantine Empire and initiated Turkish migration into Asia Minor.
September	Sentýabr	Ruhnama	Niyazov's book, defined as a spiritual guide for the Turkmen nation.
October	Oktýabr	Garaşsyzlyk	Independence – Turkmenistan's Independence Day was celebrated in October from 1992 to 2018.
November	Noýabr	Sanjar	The last ruler of the Seljuk Empire.
December	Dekabr	Bitaraplyk	Neutrality – Turkmenistan was proclaimed a neutral country, and Neutrality Day is celebrated in December.

The original names of the days of the week come from Persian. The adopted names were as follows:

English name	Old Turkmen name	Adopted Turkmen name	Meaning
Monday	Duşenbe	Başgün	First day
Tuesday	Sişenbe	Ýaşgün	Youth day
Wednesday	Çarşenbe	Hoşgün	Favourable day
Thursday	Penşenbe	Sogapgün	Justice day
Friday	Anna	Annagün	Mother day
Saturday	Şenbe	Ruhgün	Spirit day
Sunday	Ýekşenbe	Dynçgün	Rest day

== See also ==
- Gregorian calendar
- Hebrew calendar
- Islamic calendar
