= Halkbank (Turkmenistan) =

Turkmen state-owned bank

Joint-Stock Commercial Bank of Turkmenistan Halkbank
- Native name: Türkmenistanyň "Halkbank" paýdarlar täjirçilik banky
- Company type: Public OJSC
- Industry: Banking, financial services
- Founded: 1993; 33 years ago
- Headquarters: Ashgabat, Turkmenistan
- Key people: Myrat Arabow
- Products: consumer banking, corporate banking, finance and insurance, investment banking, mortgage loans, private banking, private equity, savings, Securities, asset management, wealth management, Credit cards
- Website: http://halkbank.gov.tm/

Joint-Stock Commercial Bank of Turkmenistan Halkbank (Turkmen: Türkmenistanyň "Halkbank" paýdarlar täjirçilik banky, "People's Bank"), is a Turkmen state-owned bank and financial services company, headquartered in Ashgabat. A network of Halkbank offices covers the whole territory of Turkmenistan, providing a wide range of services to the public.

According to The Banker, Halkbank was in 2011 awarded the title of "Best Bank of the Year in Turkmenistan".

== History ==
The first savings bank in the Turkmen SSR was opened on August 4, 1923.

Since January 1, 1941, 419 savings banks have been operating on the territory of the Turkmen SSR.

In 1963, the savings banks were transferred to the department of the State Bank.

After the banking reform of 1988, which resulted in the formation of a two-tier system of banks (the Central Bank and specialized banks), state savings banks from a specialized state bank serving the population and legal entities turned into a Savings Bank.

On April 30, 1993, the Turkmen Republican Bank of the State Bank of the USSR was transformed into the Savings Bank of Turkmenistan, and in 2001 it was renamed the State Commercial Bank of Turkmenistan Halkbank.

In 2021, the State Commercial Bank Halkbank was transformed into an open Joint Stock Company Halkbank. President Gurbanguly Berdimuhamedov signed the decree on reorganization of the bank at a government meeting.

== Building ==
In October 2011, new headquarters were built for Halkbank in Ashgabat and were opened on the Bank's 20th anniversary. The building has 12 stories, and is located on the central Atamyrat Niyazov Avenue 154. It has a large operating room, offices for work with VIP clients, modern ATMs, a help desk, and a conference room for 200 people. Adjacent to this building is a site which accommodates the offices of the Central Bank of Turkmenistan's assay office.

== Services ==
The bank has several types of deposits and loans. Since early 2017, Internet banking and mobile banking have begun to operate. There is also an online payment service for communal services and payment for gas and electricity.
