= Gurbansoltan Eje =

Mother of Saparmyrat Nyýazow (1913–1948)

Gurbansoltan Niýazowa (née Atamyradowa; 1913 – 6 October 1948), known as Gurbansoltan Eje, was the mother of the first post-Soviet president of Turkmenistan, Saparmyrat Nyýazow ("Türkmenbaşy"). She was killed in the 1948 Ashgabat earthquake (her husband Atamyrat Nyýazow having been killed during World War II), leaving the eight-year-old Saparmyrat an orphan.

== Legacy ==
Several places and institutions were named after her, including the city of Andalyp, as was the month of April in the Turkmen calendar, renamed in 2002 after the Turkmen government passed a law renaming all months and most days of week, a decision which was rescinded by his successor, Gurbanguly Berdimuhamedow, in April 2008. Her son also abolished the Turkmen word for bread, to be replaced with Gurbansoltan.

A statue of Gurbansoltan Eje stands in Ashgabat at latitude 37.99366 degrees north, longitude 58.32227 degrees east, in front of the Gurban Soltan Eje Vocational Complex, also named after her.

== See also ==
- Andalyp (city)
- Gurbansoltan Eje District
