= Ruhnama =

Turkmen book by Saparmurat Niyazov

- Cover
- Author: Saparmurat Niyazov
- Original title: Рухнама
- Language: Turkmen
- Subject: Culture of Turkmenistan, Turkmen people
- Publisher: Turkmen State Publishing Service
- Publication date: 1990s (withdrawn); 2001 (V1); 2004 (V2)
- Publication place: Turkmenistan

The Ruhnama, or Rukhnama, translated into English as Book of the Soul or Book of the Spirit, is a two-volume work written by Saparmurat Niyazov, the president of Turkmenistan from 1990 to 2006. The book explores the philosophical relationship between ethics and the success of states, using Turkmenistan as a case study. Turkmenistan is presented as a modern continuation of the historical Seljuk Empire, Oghuz Yabgu State, and other Turkmen-founded states. It offers an overview of Turkmen history, religion, and culture. The book was designed to serve as a form of state propaganda, emphasizing the foundations of Turkmen identity.

The Ruhnama was introduced to Turkmen culture gradually but eventually pervasively. Niyazov first placed copies in the nation's schools and libraries but eventually went as far as to make an exam on its teachings an element of the driving test. It was mandatory to read Ruhnama in schools, universities and governmental organisations. New governmental employees were tested on the book at job interviews.

After Niyazov's death in December 2006, its popularity remained high. However, in the following years, its ubiquity had waned as President Gurbanguly Berdimuhamedow removed it from the public school curriculum and halted the practice of testing university applicants on their knowledge of the book.

== Background ==
Epics had played multiple important roles in the social life of Central Asia across centuries. Pre-modern rulers of these regions usually appropriated the text and invented a connection between themselves and the epic-cast, to seek legitimacy for their new order.

Joseph Stalin had considered these epics to be "politically suspicious" and capable of inciting nationalist feelings among the masses; almost all significant Turkmen epics were condemned and banned by 1951–52. These epics would be rehabilitated back into public (and academic) discourse only with the onset of Glasnost. (Note: The Khruschev era undid some of Stalin's policies in the regard but they were not highly significant.) Ruhnama built on this rehabilitation phase.

=== Production ===
Niyazov claimed to have received a prophetic vision where Turkmen ancestors of eminence urged him to lead Turkmens to the "golden path of life". The first version was released in the 1990s but soon withdrawn because it did not fulfill Niyazov's expectations. Preparations for the revised book were underway as early as April 1999, when Niyazov declared that Mukkadesh Ruhnama (The Holy Ruhnama) would be the second landmark text of Turkmens, after the Quran.

The first volume was finally published in December 2001. On 18 February 2001, it was accepted at the 10th joint meeting of the State Assembly of Elders of Turkmenistan and the National Assembly. In September 2004, Niyazov issued a second volume. (Note: R. Nicolosi notes the publication date to be January 2005.) An edited volume of the Ruhnama, published a year later, quotes his overall purpose to have lain in highlighting the nation's significant contributions to fields of art and science.

Victoria Clement and Riccardo Nicolosi suspect that the work was ghost-written.

== Genre ==
Scholars note Ruhnama to be a "mosaic" of different literary genres, the text combines spiritual and political advice, legends, autobiography, short stories, poems, and (fabricated) Turkmen history. Written to "recover real Turkmen history without Soviet distortions", Niyazov promised the return of an atavist past from the times of Oghuz Khagan, but only if the conduct of ancient Turkmens were emulated in accordance to his sage guidance.

The Ruhnama brings the national perception into a system and organisation. I have written the Ruhnama to enable my nation to perceive our past and to envision our own dignity.

— Niyazov, c. 2002, Clement (2014)

According to Amieke Bouma, a scholar of post-socialist historiography, it is best treated as an epic in its own right: the Oğuzname of the third millennium. Tanya L. Shields reads it as an anti-colonial autobiography, which gets "almost comic in its grandiosity". It has been compared to Kemal Atatürk's Nutuk, and Leonid Brezhnev's Trilogiya.

== Contents ==
=== Volume 1 ===
Stories and proverbs are borrowed from existing Turkmen epics—Oğuzname, Book of Dede Korkut, and Epic of Koroghlu—in preaching of morals and promotion of a model code of conduct. These are often supplemented with Niyazov's explanatory annotations. (Note: Boume feels that it is rather the other way round – the epics were a vehicle for his annotations.) Virtues like generosity, unity, humility, hospitality, patience, honesty, defence of fatherland, protection of female dignity, and caring for horses (something that is placed into utmost importance by Niyazov's successor) are emphasised. Some of his own poems singing paeans of the Turkmen are present, too.

The Shajara-i Tarākima (unattributed) and writings of Ahmad ibn Fadlan are relied upon for a reconstruction of national history. Some seventy states are alleged to have been established by them—the Anau culture, Parthian Empire, Achaemenid Empire, Seljuk Empire, and Ottoman Empire among others—till the eighteenth century; this entire span was simultaneously periodised into four epic-epochs. (Note: "The epoch of Oghuz Khan" (5000 BC – 650 CE), followed by "the epoch of Gorkut Ata" (650 CE – 10th century CE); "the epoch of Görogly" (10th – 17th centuries); and "the epoch of Magtymguly" (17th – 20th centuries).) Distinct since the inception of humans, (Note: Tools of Soviet Historiography like ethnogenesis were relied upon to make this construct.) the Turkmen were the same as the Turks and descended from the venerable Noah via Oghuz Khagan, who had set up the first polity c. 5000 years ago. (Note: Ancient Turkmenistan "stretched from Altyntepe through Anew, Nusay, Takgala, the entire Merw, Koneurgench and Caspian-Belh region, including Seyhun-Jeyhun from east to west up to the Idil Sea in the north".) (Note: Iranian and Arab historians were blamed for co-opting all these states as one of their own, and for later generalising them as Turkish. Turkmenistan SSR historians were blamed for repeating such assertions without critical scrutiny.) Warfare was apparently rare, and the state always preferred peace. Despite vague references to archaeo-historical evidence to support this range of pioneer assertions, there is a total lack of source material, as understood in an academic sense.

The Persian sphere of influence on Turkmen polity across the medieval era was neatly purged; though, Zoroaster was appropriated as a Turkmen hero who had advised people not to abide by Mazdak's path of fire-worship. Both 18th and 19th centuries—integral to the foundation of modern Turkmenistan—are skipped except for the mention of Magtymguly Pyragy and the Battle of Geok Tepe. Soviet Turkmenistan is described in a single page, where it is blamed for colonisation. The narrative resumes with Niyazov ushering in independence of the state. Several of his specific policies find a mention.

Niyazov's life is described in great detail throughout the text—loss of parents in childhood, attachment to land, and his patriotic zeal for attaining sovereignty from Soviet imperialism. These descriptions form an embedded stratum of the volume.

=== Volume 2 ===
Drafted with explicit parallels to the Quran, this volume asked that the Ruhnama be recited as a regular prayer after purifying oneself; it was also to never lie in an improper place.

Thematically, the volume is concerned with morals and ethics. A total of 21 chapters deal with optimum manners and decorum for different situations and target audiences. Niyazov's own narration gains a position of authority; he does not always seek support from the epics to support his positions.

== Society ==
=== Niyazov ===
Niccolosi notes Ruhnama to have transformed Turkmenistan into an "epideictic space", which was in "permanent, unanimous exultation of the person of Niyazov". Bouma found the Ruhnama to rebirth Turkmenistan under Niyazov's responsible leadership. The most significant component of ideological propaganda during the later phase of Niyazov's personality cult, the text was a marker of politico-cultural literacy and key to survival in post-Soviet Turkmenistan. Niyazov claimed those who read it thrice were destined for heaven. (Note: However, he had sometimes claimed that Ruhanama is not a religious scripture and it never meant to dislodge Quran.)

In 2002, Niyazov's government adopted a law to rename the months of the year and days of the week in the Turkmen language, with the new names being references to parts of Ruhnama, including naming September after the book itself.

After the publication of the second volume, Niyazov had mosques and churches display the Ruhnama as prominently as the Quran and Bible, and cite its passages during sermons. The Türkmenbaşy Ruhy Mosque, which was commissioned in 2002 at his birthplace, is the largest mosque in Central Asia and features engravings from the Ruhnama as well as the Quran across its wall and minarets. (Note: Niyazov would be buried near this mosque, after his death.) A twenty foot tall neon Ruhnama was erected at an Ashgabat park in 2003. (Note: The book features a gold motif of Niyazov's bust on its cover with seven granite columns (representing his seven ancestors) erect around it. Each evening, the cover opened and a propaganda film commemorating Turkmen history was projected onto the pages to accompanying music. The frequency of the event has decreased since Berdimuhamedow's ascent to power.) A mural of Niyazov drafting the Ruhnama has been put in place, too. In August 2005, the first volume was launched into orbit so that it could "conquer space".

A photo-journalistic essay in 2006 noted the nation to be filled with advertisements of Ruhnama – each at a cost of two dollars. Government offices featured the Ruhnama prominently on their desk (often devoting a separate room), and state media regularly broadcast their content, with religious reverence. (Note: The extent of state action upon violations of these provisions, remain disputed.) Official ceremonies featured hundreds of Turkmens singing from the book. 12 September was declared a national holiday.

==== Education ====
Ruhnama was the most integral aspect of the national educational curriculum across multiple domains. This emphasis on Ruhnama obviously ran in parallel to a rapid deterioration in overall standards of education.

A course in Ruhnama was mandated for all students in school as part of social sciences. It was also made a required reading across all universities, and knowledge of the text was necessary for holding state employment; this perpetuated discrimination on minorities who were not proficient in Turkmen. (Note: One had to undertake a 16-hour course on Ruhnama to qualify for a driving licence.) (Note: A poetry volume by Niyazov was also made compulsory.) Turkmen State University even had a "Department of the Holy Ruhnama of Türkmenbaşy the Great", and Ruhnama Studies were pursued as a major research agenda in the country, often at the cost of academic disciplines.

The text also doubled as the sole government-approved version of history across all Turkmen schools until Niyazov's demise, and had a substantial negative effect on academic scholarship. (Note: Bouma believes that teachers probably made simultaneous use of erstwhile Soviet textbooks; at least to discuss world history because Ruhnama lacked any significant discourse on those themes. The Soviet publications were instead lacking in Turkmen history, a void exploited by Ruhnama.) Several conferences on Ruhnama itself were organised by historical and cultural institutes. (Note: These organisations include The Miras National Center for the Cultural Heritage of Translation, National Institute of Manuscripts, and The State Institute for Cultural Heritage of the Peoples of Turkmenistan, Central Asia and the Orient. All were set up under Niyazov's decrees to replace the Soviet-era Academy of Sciences.) Other common topics were Turkmen epics, ancient Turkmen culture, and men of eminence – all deriving from Ruhnama. (Note: Some even attempted to locate genealogical connections between Niyazov and a range of eminent personalities from Alexander the Great to the Prophet Muhammad.) The only books which were allowed to be published were those whose views were in service of Ruhnama; Turkmenistan does not have a significant record of public debates surrounding history, unlike other post-Soviet states. (Note: Bouma notes that Niyazov had called for academics to produce new surveys of Turkmen history as early as 1988. These manuscripts never made it past the state censorship, despite multiple cycles of revision. In 2000, a history book by N. Rakhimov was approved by the authorities and recommended as a textbook. Soon enough, all copies were destroyed on Niyazov's order because it claimed that Turkmens have originated from the Mongolian Altai region.)

In 2004, primary and secondary schools were assigned between two and four hours a week to Ruhnama while universities were assigned from four to eight hours. (Note: A 2002 report by BBC had noted a tenth-grader Turkmen to study Ruhnama twice a week.) 26 of the 57 examination cards for the 2006 Turkmenistan University Entrance Examination revolved around themes set in Ruhnama. (Note: Even text-books of mathematics for the primary tier had problems set up around Ruhnama.) In the words of Laura E. Kennedy, Ruhnama was taught with a theological zeal.

=== Berdimuhamedow ===
In his early days, Ruhnama was led away from its earlier spot-of-prominence though it continued to be a part of educational curricula. In Spring of 2007, official references to Ruhnama were trimmed and around 2009–10, television broadcasts of Ruhnama stopped. Scholars have noted these incremental changes to fit Berdimuhamedow's posturing as a would-be harbinger of Turkmen renaissance, which necessitated partial critique of his predecessor's tenure.

In 2011, the requirement to pass a secondary-school examination on the Ruhnama was rescinded. And in 2014, it was finally declared that Turkmen universities would no longer test applicants on their knowledge of the book, in what Slavomir Horak interpreted as the total purge of Ruhnama from Turkmen educational curricula.

It has been noted that books written by Berdimuhamedow, Niyazov's successor, had begun to be included in coursework following his inauguration as leader. Luca Anceschi, an expert on the region and University of Glasgow professor, saw this as a transfer of Niyazov's cult of personality to Berdimuhamedow.

== Translations ==
The Ruhnama has been translated to over 50 languages. These translations were primarily designed by foreign corporations to gain a cordial relationship with Niyazov, and were not meant for international consumption. (Note: The German translations were prepared by Daimler-Chrysler (vol. 1) and Siemens (vol. 2).)

These state-authorized translations vary substantially from one to another, leading Dan Shapira to conclude that the text remains in flux. The English version was translated from a Turkish translation of Ruhnama; it does not correspond to the Turkmen version in many places, but is generally more accurate and bulky than the Russian translation.

== Media ==
Shadow of the Holy Book is a documentary on human rights abuses in Turkmenistan.

== See also ==
- Quotations from Chairman Mao Tse-tung
- The Green Book
- Bibliolatry
