= Türkmenbaşı Nature Park =

Nature park in Sarıyer, Istanbul, Turkey

- Türkmenbaşı Tabiat Parkı
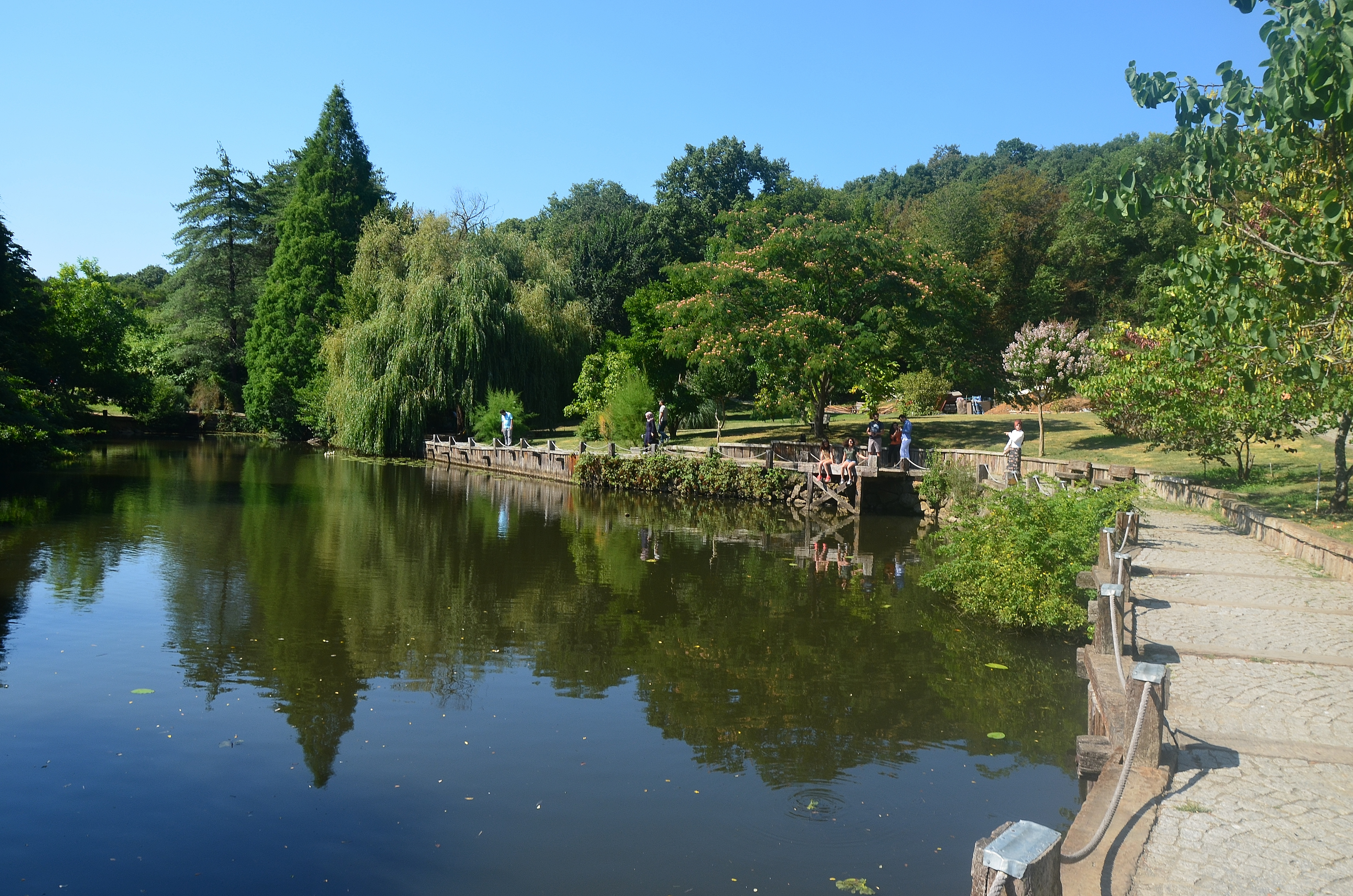

- Location within Istanbul
- Location: Sarıyer, Istanbul Province, Turkey
- Coordinates: 41°08′26″N 29°01′39″E
- Area: 5.6 ha (14 acres)
- Established: 1998

Türkmenbaşı Nature Park (Turkish: Türkmenbaşı Tabiat Parkı) is a nature park located in Sarıyer district of Istanbul Province, Turkey.

Situated west of Hacı Osman Bayırı Avenue in the PTT Evleri neighborhood of Büyükdere in the district of Sarıyer, it covers an area of 5.6 ha (14 acres). It was established in 1998 as a place, to dignify the cultural values shared by Turkey and Turkmenistan. It was named "Turkmenbashi" (literally: Head of Turkmens), in honor of Saparmurat Niyazov (1940–2006), the leader of Turkmenistan.

The nature park offers outdoor recreation activities such as hiking and picnicing for visitors on daily basis. There is a playground for children.

== Ecosystem ==
Flora

Common plant of the nature park is pine. Other notable trees are oak (Quercus petraea), hornbeam (Carpinus betulus), oriental plane (Platanus orientalis), Norway spruce (Picea abies), Mediterranean cypress (Cupressus sempervirens), honeyberry, (Celtis australis), medlar (Mespilus germanica), shinglewood (Thuja plicata) and the shrubs lavender (Lavandula spica), barberry (Berberis vulgaris), glossy abelia (Abelia × grandiflora), pittosporum (Pittosporum tobira), cherry laurel (Laurocerasus officinalis), Chinese photinia (Photinia serratifolia), strawberry tree (Arbutus unedo), Japanese aucuba (Aucuba japonica), fountainplant (Ophiopogon japonicus).

Fauna

The main fauna of the nature park consists of bird species. Observed bird species are finch, magpie, sparrow, Western jackdaw, woodpecker. Other species are lizard and chipmunk.
