= Melon Day =

National holiday in Turkmenistan

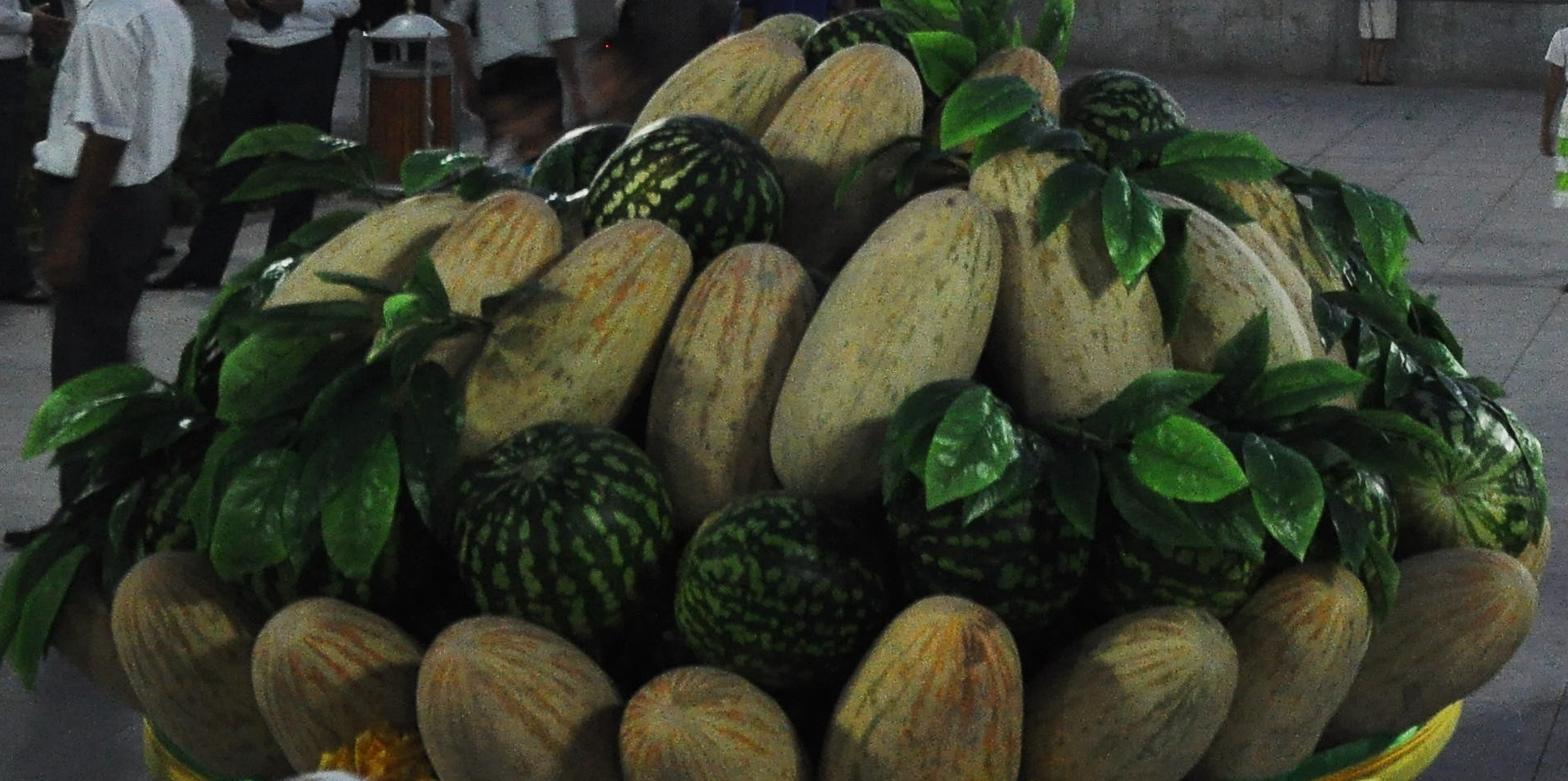
- Melons and watermelons in Ashgabat
- Observed by: Turkmenistan
- Type: National
- Date: Second Sunday in August
- 2025 date: August 10
- 2026 date: August 9
- 2027 date: August 8
- 2028 date: August 13
- Frequency: annual
- First time: 1994

Melon Day is an annual national holiday in Turkmenistan devoted to festivities to celebrate the country's melon, in particular a recent crossbreed product named "Turkmenbashy melon" (after Turkmenistan's first president), which is praised for its aroma, taste and massive size. It takes place on the second Sunday in August.

This holiday was established by Turkmenistan's then-President Saparmurat Niyazov in 1994, who preferred to be known as Turkmenbashy (Turkmen: Türkmenbaşy), or head of the Turkmen people. The day's celebrations feature a large display of the fruit in all its varieties, as well as a series of dance and music events, in the country's capital, Ashgabat.

In his address to farmers in 2004, President Niyazov said: "Almighty God has turned Turkmen soil into a fertile source of an abundance of the tastiest fruits. Among them are Turkmen melons, which are the result of farmers' hard work and which have a unique taste reminiscent of the fruit of paradise." In newspapers Niyazov was quoted as saying, "The Turkmen melon is the source of our pride. Its taste has no equals in the world, the smell makes your head spin."

Melon Day is among 24 public holidays of Turkmenistan – typical titles of which are Drop of Water is a Grain of Gold Festival, Festival of the Poetry of Magtymguli, Good Neighborliness Day, Race Horse Day, and Carpet Day.

== See also ==
- Public holidays in Turkmenistan
