= Qıpçaq =

- Municipality
- Location within Azerbaijan Location within Shaki-Zagatala Economic Region
- Coordinates: 41°18′09″N 46°49′41″E
- Country: Azerbaijan
- Rayon: Qakh

Population
  - Total: 616
- Time zone: UTC+4 (AZT)
  - Summer (DST): UTC+5 (AZT)

Qıpçaq (Гыпчаг and قيپچاق; also, Kypchag, Kypchak, and Kypchakh) is a village and municipality in the Qakh Rayon of Azerbaijan. It has a population of 616.

== See also ==
- Gypjak
- Kipchak people
