= Türkmenbaşy Ruhy Mosque =

Mosque in Gypjak, Turkmenistan

Coordinates: 38°1′4″N 58°15′10″E

Türkmenbaşy Ruhy Mosque (Kıpçak Camii)
- Türkmenbaşy Ruhy Metjidi (Turkmen)

Religion
- Affiliation: Islam
- Status: Active

Location
- Location: Gypjak, Ashgabat, Turkmenistan
- Interactive map of Türkmenbaşy Ruhy Mosque (Kıpçak Camii)

Architecture
- Type: Mosque
- Style: Islamic
- Completed: 2004

Specifications
- Capacity: 10,000 people
- Minaret: 4
- Minaret height: 91 m (299 ft)
- Materials: white marble

Türkmenbaşy Ruhy Mosque (Turkmen: Türkmenbaşy Ruhy Metjidi), or Gypjak Mosque, (Note: Also spelled Kipchak Mosque.) is a mosque in Gypjak, Turkmenistan, and the resting place for Saparmurat Niyazov, the leader of Turkmenistan from 1985 to 2006. The mosque is located about 7 kilometres (4.3 mi) west of the capital, Ashgabat, on the M37 highway.

== Overview ==
Nyýazow's mausoleum, directly next to the mosque

The mosque, constructed by the French company Bouygues, was built in the hometown of President Saparmurat Niyazov. It opened on 22 October 2004, and was built by Nyýazow with a mausoleum in preparation for his death. Nyýazow died two years later and was buried in the mausoleum on 24 December 2006.

The mosque has been at the center of controversy as text from both the Quran and Niyazov's Ruhnama (The Book of the Soul) have been carved/built into the walls and the books themselves are displayed side by side, even as the practice was stopped for all other mosques in Turkmenistan after Niyazov's death by President Gurbanguly Berdimuhamedow. The mosque can currently accommodate up to 10,000 congregants. Many Muslims consider the implied equality of the Quran and the Ruhnama as blasphemous and heretical, especially devout mosquegoers.

== Reconstruction ==
The major modernization of the mosque with a capacity of 10 thousand people was carried out in 2024. The mosque was opened after reconstruction in September 2024.

Panoramic view of the mosque

== See also ==
- Ertuğrul Gazi Mosque
- Gurbanguly Hajji Mosque
