= Humanitarian Association of World Turkmens =

The Humanitarian Association of World Turkmens (Turkmen: Dünýä türkmenleriniň ynsanperwer birleşigi) or GATM is the organization meant to bring together Turkmen people in Turkmenistan and other parts of the world.

== Background ==
The idea of the association was expressed by the Agzybirlik Popular movement, an opposition group in the early 1990s that worked for the renaissance of the Turkmen heritage.

The Association of Turkmens of the World was founded by the Turkmen President Saparmurat Niyazov on 21 May 1991 at a council meeting. Niyazov, the self-proclaimed "Father of All Turkmen," led Turkmenistan for 15 years after independence from the Soviet Union in 1991, and was perceived as a radical move considering the cultural repression of the Soviet era. Its original goal is the preservation of the Turkmen culture, and the printing of its own information publication in Arabic, Latin and Russian.

Niyazov undertook several initiatives to promote Turkmen culture including new Turkmen-oriented holidays as well as the introduction of a new Latin-based Turkmen alphabet to replace the Cyrillic alphabet in use at the time.

In 2001, the GATM voted to suffix the name of Niyazov with "Beyt" (Great). The Tajikistan GATM offices opened in February 2004.

== Description ==
The main goal of the new organization was to "create a never-ending bond between Turkmen peoples scattered throughout the world and their native lands". The organization finances events linked to the Turkmen heritage and culture. Technically, the GATM does not address political or economical matters.

In 2009, the GATM had representations in Central Asian countries, Saudi Arabia, Iran, Turkey, Germany and Russia. In 2018, the GATM has 27 offices in 14 countries.

The association encourages studies in the Turkmen history and counts many ties with Muslim organizations. It also organizes the International Festival of the Turkmens of the World, which promotes Turkmen arts.

== Related pages ==
- Turkmenistan
- Turkmen people
- Saparmurat Niyazov
