= Gypjak =

Village in Ashgabat, Turkmenistan

- Türkmenbaşy Ruhy Mosque

- Location in Turkmenistan
- Coordinates: 38°0′0″N 58°15′2″E
- Country: Turkmenistan
- City: Ashgabat
- Borough: Bagtyýarlyk Borough of Ashgabat
- Time zone: UTC+5

Gypjak (also known as Kipchak) is a former village that was annexed into the Turkmen capital of Ashgabat in 2013. It is now a neighborhood in Bagtyýarlyk Borough of Ashgabat.

== Overview ==
The neighborhood is known as having been the home village of the first President of Turkmenistan, Saparmurat Niyazov. Niyazov, while president, built the Türkmenbaşy Ruhy Mosque, often referred to as the Kipchak Mosque, and a tomb there for his family. Niyazov was buried in the tomb on December 24, 2006. The Türkmenbaşy Ruhy Mosque lies across a highway from the rest of the neighborhood. It is the largest mosque in Central Asia, and has a capacity of 10,000 people.

The neighborhood has one centrally located public school, and several small convenience shops (Turkmen: dükanlar). There are a post office and an auto parts store near the main road.

== See also ==
- Qıpçaq
- Kipchak people
