= Saparmurat Niyazov =

President of Turkmenistan from 1991 to 2006

Türkmenbaşy Saparmurat Niyazov
- Saparmyrat Nyýazow
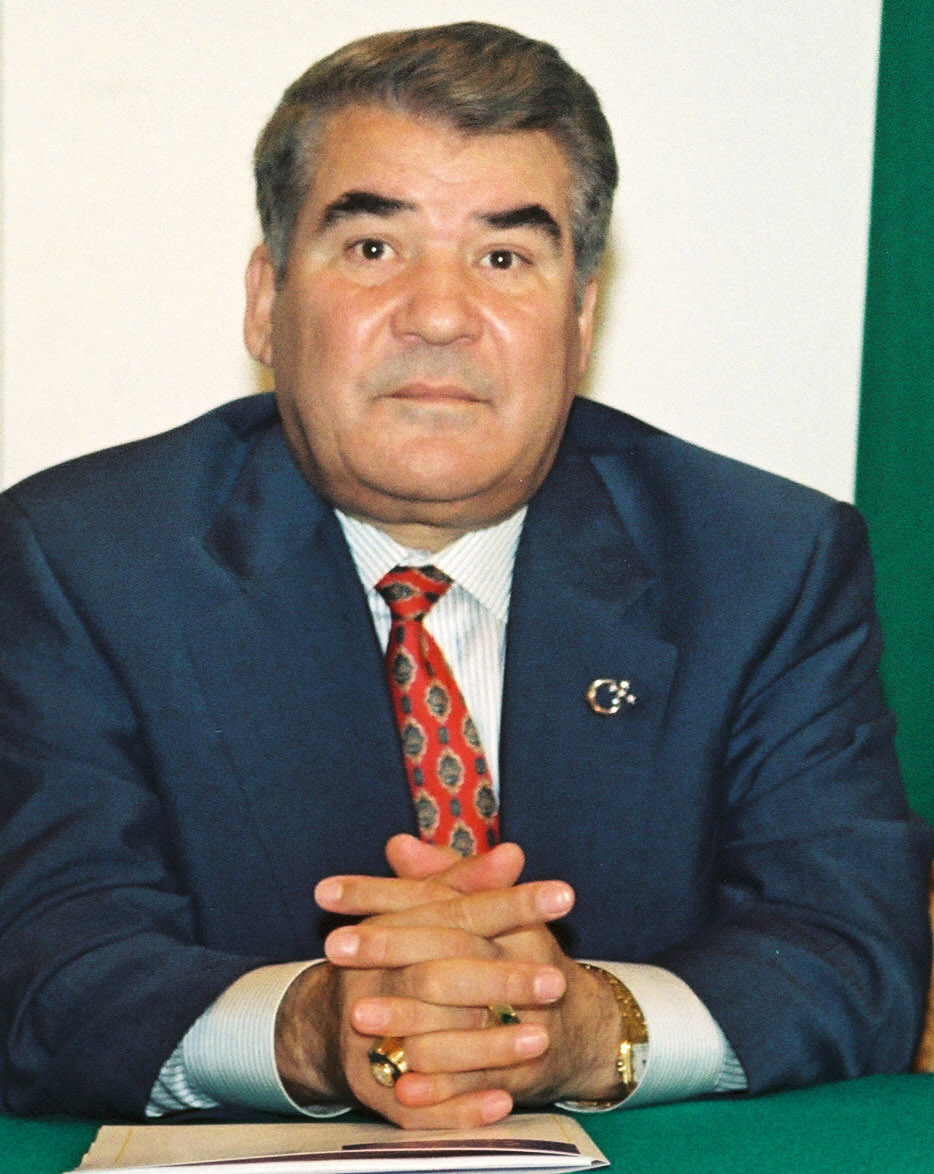
- Niyazov in 1998

1st President of Turkmenistan
- In office TSSR: 2 November 1990 – 27 October 1991; Independent Turkmenistan: 27 October 1991 – 21 December 2006
- Prime Minister: Han Ahmedow (1990–1992)
- Vice President: Ata Çaryýew (1992); Orazgeldi Aýdogdiýew (1992–2001); Gurbanguly Berdimuhamedow (2001–2006)
- Preceded by: Office established
- Succeeded by: Gurbanguly Berdimuhamedow

Leader of the Democratic Party of Turkmenistan
- In office 16 December 1991 – 21 December 2006
- Preceded by: Position established
- Succeeded by: Gurbanguly Berdimuhamedow

First Secretary of the Central Committee of the Communist Party of Turkmenistan
- In office 21 December 1985 – 16 December 1991
- Preceded by: Muhammetnazar Gapurow
- Succeeded by: Office abolished

Full member of the 28th Politburo
- In office 14 July 1990 – 29 August 1991

Personal details
- Born: Saparmyrat Ataýewiç Nyýazow; 19 February 1940 Gypjak, Turkmen SSR, Soviet Union
- Died: 21 December 2006 (aged 66) Ashgabat, Turkmenistan
- Party: Democratic Party of Turkmenistan (1991–2006)
- Other political affiliations: Communist Party of Turkmenistan (1962–1991); Communist Party of the Soviet Union (1962–1991)
- Spouse: Muza Melnikova (m. 1967)
- Children: 2
- Parents: Atamyrat Nyýazow (father); Gurbansoltan Niýazowa (mother)
- Education: Leningrad Polytechnic Institute
- Profession: Electrical engineer
- Nickname: Türkmenbaşy

Military service
- Allegiance: Turkmenistan
- Branch/service: Armed Forces of Turkmenistan
- Rank: General of the Army

Saparmurat Atayevich Niyazov (Note: Turkmen: Saparmyrat Ataýewiç Nyýazow (Turkmen pronunciation: [θɑpɑmɯˈɾɑt ɑˈtɑjɛβɪtʃ nɯˈjɑðoβ]); Russian: Сапармурат Атаевич Ниязов) (19 February 1940 – 21 December 2006) was a Turkmen politician and dictator who led Turkmenistan from 1985 until his death in 2006. He was the first secretary of the Communist Party of Turkmenistan from 1985 until 1991 and supported the 1991 Soviet coup attempt. He continued to rule Turkmenistan as the first president for 15 years after independence from the Soviet Union in 1991.

Turkmen media referred to Niyazov using the title His Excellency Saparmyrat Türkmenbaşy, President of Turkmenistan and Chairman of the Cabinet of Ministers. His self-given title Türkmenbaşy, meaning Head of the Turkmen or the Leader of all Turkmen, referred to his position as the founder and president of the Association of Turkmens of the World. In 1999, the Assembly of Turkmenistan declared Niyazov President for life.

In his time, Niyazov was one of the world's most repressive and autocratic dictators. He promoted a cult of personality around himself and imposed his personal eccentricities upon the country, such as renaming Turkmen months and days of the week to references to his autobiography, the Ruhnama. He made it mandatory to read the Ruhnama in schools, universities and governmental organizations; new governmental employees were tested on the book at job interviews and an exam on its teachings was a part of the driving test in Turkmenistan. In 2005, he closed down all rural libraries and hospitals outside of the capital city Ashgabat, in a country where at the time more than half the population lived in rural areas, once stating that, "If people are ill, they can come to Ashgabat."

Under Niyazov's rule, Turkmenistan had the lowest life expectancy in Central Asia. Global Witness, a London-based human rights organisation, reported that money under Niyazov's control and held overseas may be in excess of US$3 billion, of which between $1.8–$2.6 billion was allegedly situated in the Foreign Exchange Reserve Fund at Deutsche Bank in Germany.

== Early life ==
Niyazov was born on 19 February 1940 in Gypjak, in the outskirts of Ashgabat, in the Turkmen SSR. He was a member of the influential Teke tribe of the Turkmens. According to the official version of his biography, his father, Atamyrat Nyýazow, died in World War II fighting against Nazi Germany, while other sources contend that he dodged fighting and was therefore sentenced by a military court. His mother and two brothers were killed in the devastating 1948 Ashgabat earthquake. His mother, Gurbansoltan Eje, later on became part of Niyazov's cult of personality after he named several places and institutions after her, renamed the month of April in the Turkmen calendar after her, and replaced the Turkmen word for "bread" with her first name, among other things. He grew up in a Soviet orphanage before the state put him in the custody of a distant relative.

After finishing school in 1959, Niyazov worked as an instructor in the Turkmen trade-union exploratory committee. He then studied at the Leningrad Polytechnic Institute, where in 1967 he received a diploma as an electrical engineer. After graduating, Niyazov went to study in Russia, but was expelled a few years later for academic failure.

== Soviet politics ==
In 1962, Niyazov started his political career, becoming a member of the Communist Party. He quickly rose through the ranks, becoming First Secretary of the Ashgabat City Committee, and First Secretary of the Communist Party of the Turkmen SSR in 1985. He gained this post after Soviet General Secretary Mikhail Gorbachev had removed his predecessor, Muhammetnazar Gapurow, following a cotton-related scandal. Under Niyazov, the Turkmen Communist Party had a reputation as one of the most hardline and unreformed party organizations in the Soviet Union. On 13 January 1990, Niyazov became Chairman of the Supreme Soviet of the Turkmen SSR, the supreme legislative body in the republic. The post was equivalent to that of president.

Niyazov supported the Soviet coup attempt of 1991. However, after the coup collapsed, he set about separating Turkmenistan from the dying Soviet Union. The Turkmen Supreme Soviet declared Turkmenistan independent and appointed Niyazov as the country's first president on 27 October 1991.

== Presidency (1990–2006) ==
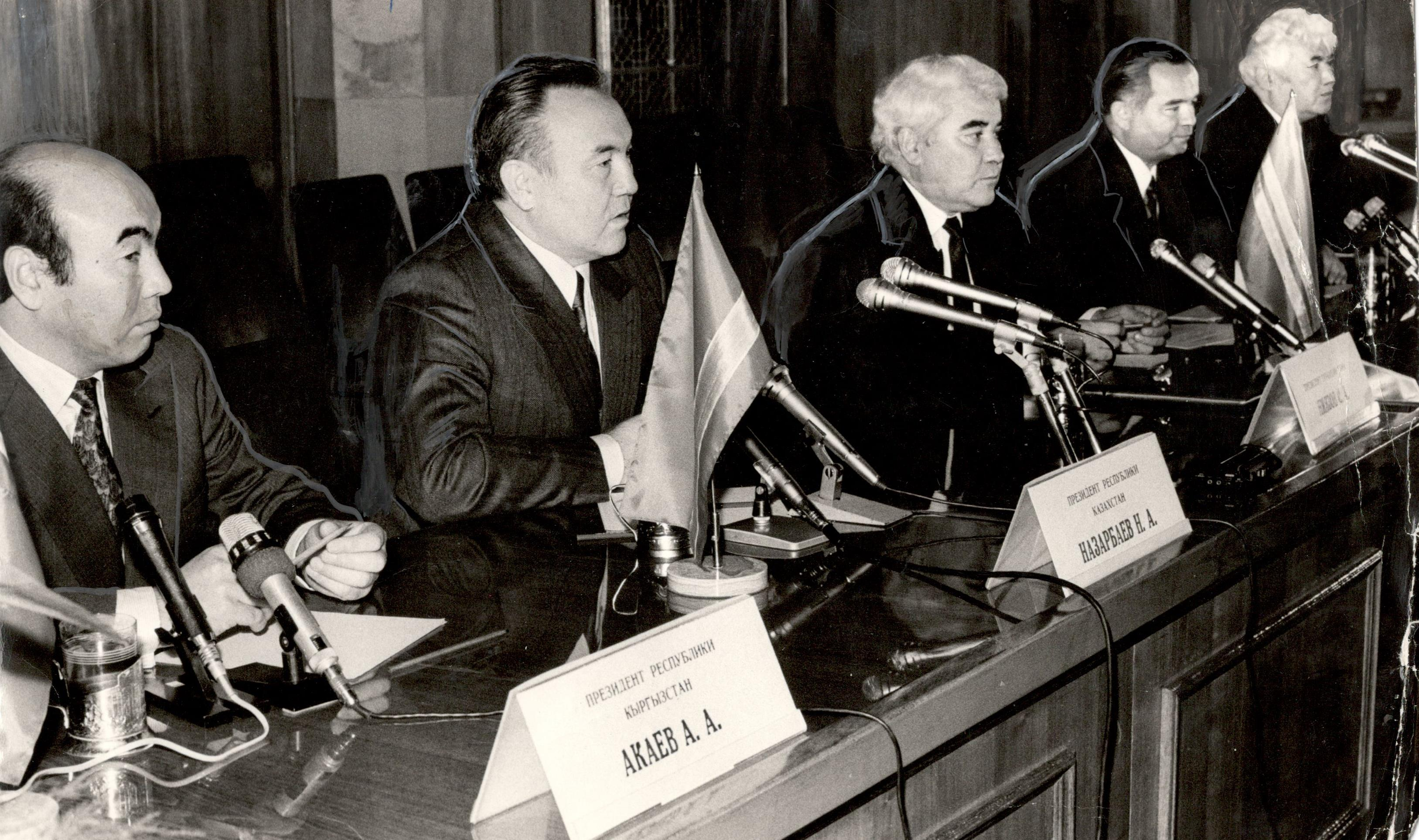
A. Akaev, N. Nazarbaev, S. Niyazov, I. Karimov, R. Nabiev during the CIS meeting c. 1991

Niyazov became president at the transition of Turkmenistan from a Soviet republic to an independent state. His presidency was characterised by an initial crumbling of the centralised Soviet model that in many respects was unsuited for a transition to smaller, separate states. There was outside concern about press freedom and to a lesser extent religious rights of minority religious groups. Niyazov made a personal attempt to create a cultural background for the new state of Turkmenistan by writing and promoting the Ruhnama, an autobiography meant to guide the people of Turkmenistan with his ideas and promote native culture (and by extension prohibiting foreign culture). He also took part in creating new holidays with a specific Turkmen nature and introduced a new Latin-based Turkmen alphabet to replace Russian Cyrillic. The Latin Turkmen alphabet, or "Turkmen National Alphabet" consists of: Aa, Bb, Çç, Dd, Ee, Ää, Ff, Gg, Hh, Ii, Jj, Žž, Kk, Ll, Mm, Nn, Ňň, Oo, Öö, Pp, Rr, Ss, Şş, Tt, Uu, Üü, Ww, Yy, Ýý, Zz.

Despite emphasizing a need to move from central planning to a market economy and to a full democracy during his reign, neither plan progressed. Yearly plans set forth by the government and a centralised economy gave little indication of moving away from state-dominated economics, and the dictatorial nature of many of his decrees and his declaring himself "President for Life" gave little hope as to much progress in these two areas.

On 21 June 1992 the Turkmenistani presidential election featured Niyazov as the sole candidate, and chosen as the country's first popularly elected president. A year later he declared himself Türkmenbaşy, meaning "Leader of all Turkmen".

In 1994 a plebiscite extended Niyazov's term to 2002 so he could oversee a 10-year development plan. The official results showed that 99.9% of voters approved this proposal.

On 28 December 1999, Parliament declared Niyazov President for life; parliamentary elections had been held a few weeks earlier for which the president had hand-picked all candidates.

=== Economy ===
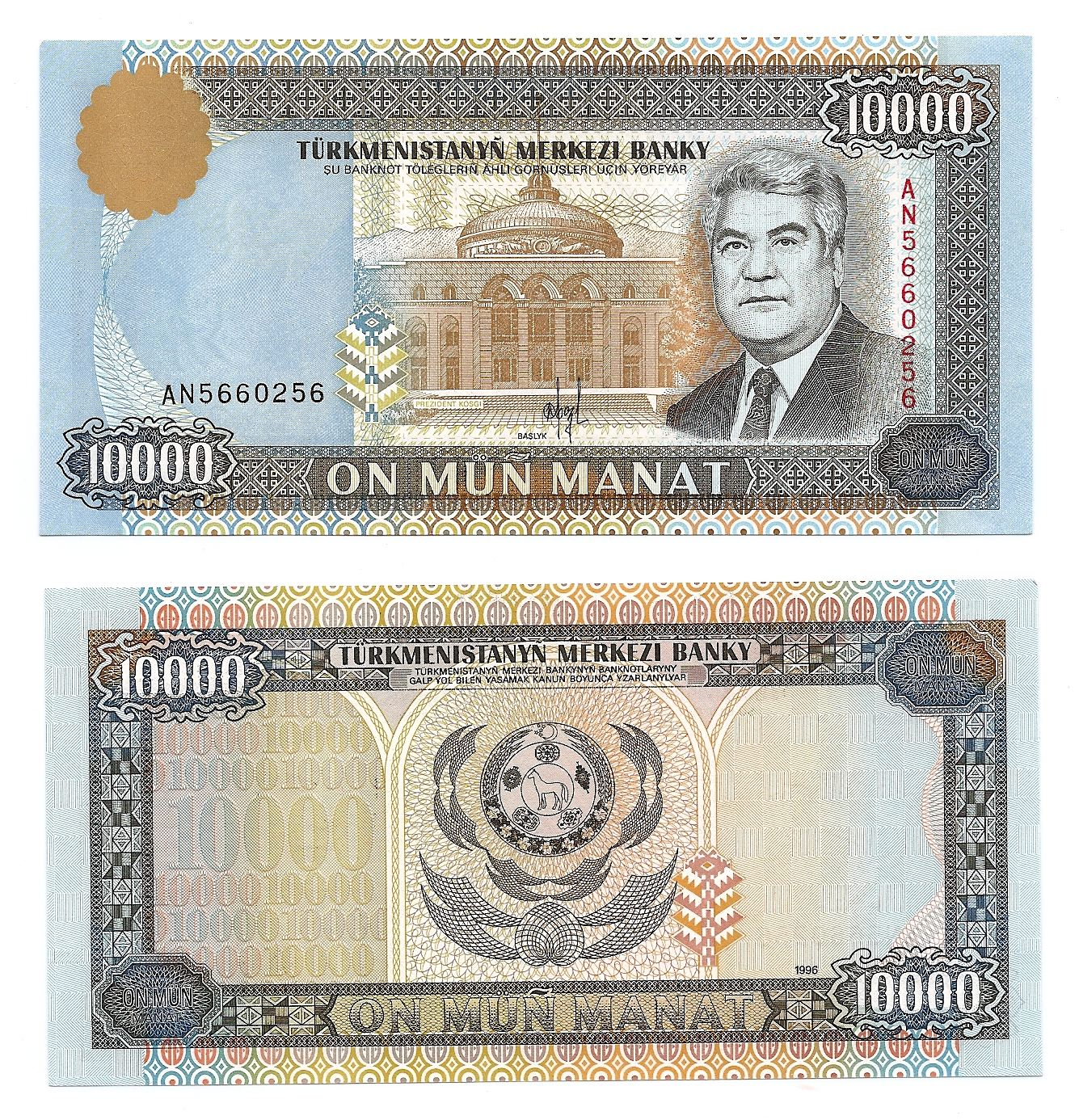
Saparmurat Niyazov is depicted on the 10,000 manat banknote from 1996

==== Oil and gas ====
Turkmenistan has the second-largest oil reserves in the former Soviet Union, generating high revenue for the state. The government has used central planning, such as state control of production and procurement, direct bank credits with low interest rates, exchange rate restrictions, and price controls, since it existed as a Republic within the USSR.

In the years following independence, Turkmenistan invested heavily in plants and machinery in an attempt to convert it from being primarily a supplier of petroleum to a more advanced economy; such investments included oil refineries and a polyethylene plant. In an interview with Rossiyskaya Gazeta newspaper, Niyazov claimed that Turkmenistan was able to process 85% of its domestic output. Additionally, numerous petroleum transportation projects were completed such as a pipeline from the Körpeje field to Kordkuy in Iran.

In 1991 and 2001, Niyazov issued decrees making water, gas, electricity, and refined salt free to use for ten-year periods. In 2005, Niyazov appointed Gurbanmyrat Ataýew as Minister of Oil and Gas, succeeding Atamyrat Berdyýew.

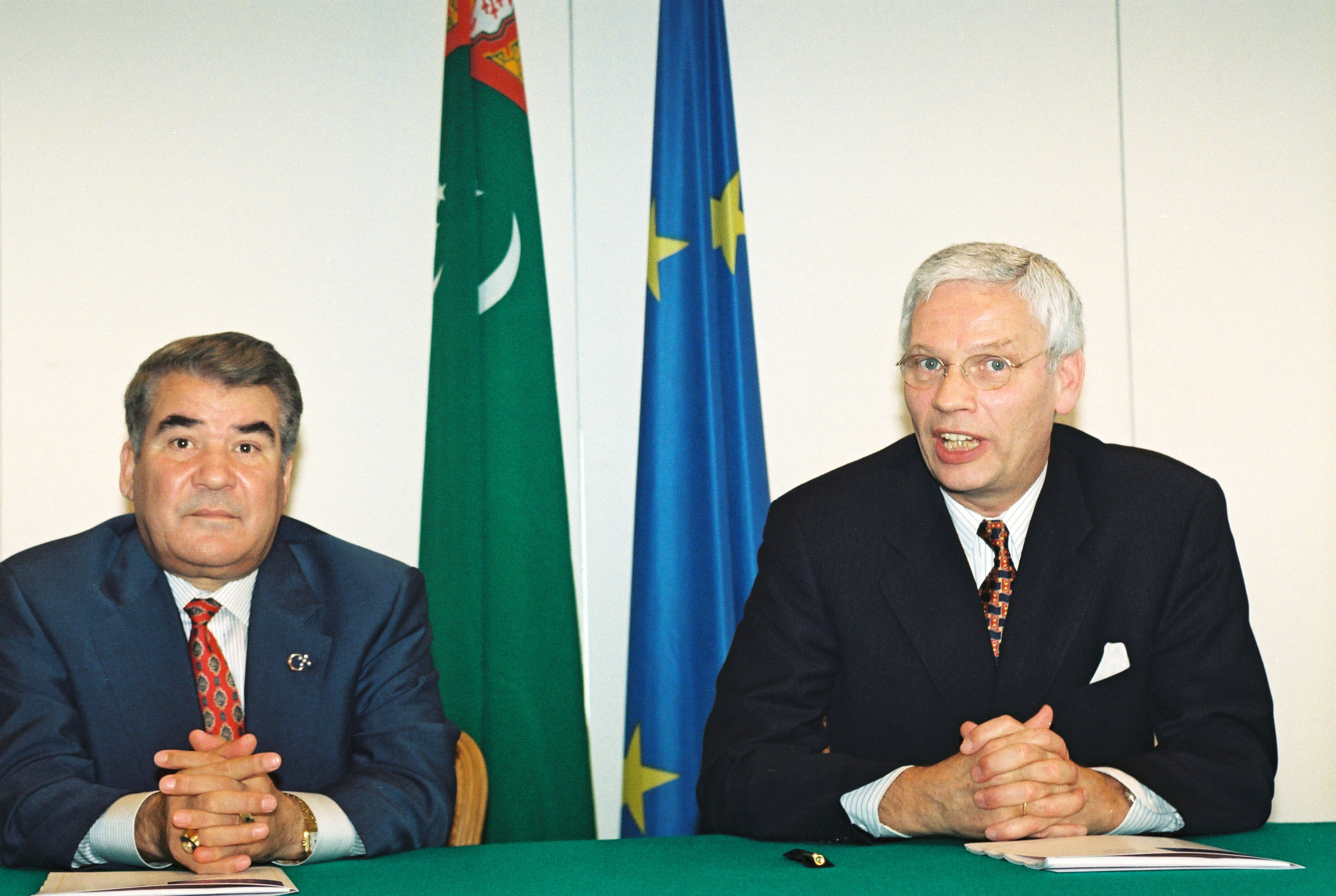
Niyazov with European Commissioner Hans van den Broek in Brussels, 24 February 1998

==== Agriculture ====
Turkmenistan's other primary resources are cotton and grain. Niyazov continued the old practice of demanding yearly quotas in agricultural output, and then blaming and/or sacking deputy ministers when quotas were not met. Nevertheless, Turkmenistan had an emergent period during which there was heavy investment in plant and machinery so the country could change from a producer of raw cotton to a cotton processor. During Niyazov's presidency, a textile industry was founded in Turkmenistan.

Niyazov introduced the practice of "Melon Day", a harvest festival celebrated on the 2nd Sunday of August; unlike some of his other creations, the celebration of "Melon Day" has continued after his death.

=== Culture ===
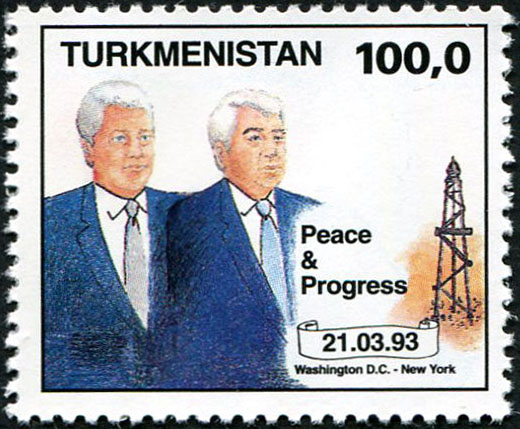
Postage stamp of Niyazov and US president Bill Clinton, 1993

Niyazov put the revival of Turkmen culture as one of the top priorities in Turkmenistan's development. The National Revival Movement, an organisation to promote Turkmen culture (Turkmen: "Galkynyş"), was also founded. In 1990, Soviet Turkmenistan had proclaimed Turkmen the state language, as a part of perestroika reforms. The Turkmen alphabet became commonly used in newspapers, textbooks, street signs, maps, and license plates. Many citizens, however, only used the new script at work, but continued to use cyrillic Turkmen in their personal lives. Teachers throughout the country were offered summer programming by the Turkmen Ministry of Education, in order to learn the new alphabet. Students often had trouble learning the new language, as Russian was the lingua franca of industry, medicine, education, and the state.

In many respects, Niyazov's cultural ideas and changes were most visible to external viewers. His renaming of months, as well as most of the days of the week, to Turkmen heroes, poets, historical events, family members and himself was an unexpected development. For example, September was renamed Ruhnama in honour of the book written by Niyazov (which he finished writing on 19 September 2001). Not all the changes promoted Niyazov; October was renamed Garaşsyzlyk (Independence) to mark the state's founding on 27 October 1991, and November Sanjar in honour of Sultan Sanjar who led the Seljuks to their last full flowering. The new names came into effect with the introduction of a new labor law which stated that "the dates of professional holidays are specified by decrees of the President of Turkmenistan". These names were later abolished by his successor Berdimuhamedow in April 2008.

The flag, currency, and national anthem, as well as city and street names were also changed. One street was named after Gorogly Shayolu, a Turkmen folk hero.

His father Atamyrat Nyýazow's Red Army service was used to shape how the country celebrates Victory Day on 9 May. Unlike other Central Asian countries, Turkmenistan under Niyazov put emphasis on the country's sacrifice during the Second World War. In 2005, Niyazov flew to Moscow to celebrate the diamond jubilee of the war's end, and just days prior, he congratulated Turkmen veterans of the war as well as Russian veterans on behalf of Vladimir Putin and Ukrainian veterans on behalf of Viktor Yushchenko. Individually, Niyaov's father was awarded the honorary title of Hero of Turkmenistan in 1994 and in 2004, a division of the Turkmen Ground Forces was renamed after Atamyrat Nyýazow. Today, the 22nd Motor Rifle Division "Atamyrat Nyýazow" deployed in Gyzylarbat carries his name.

=== Internal affairs ===
In 1999, Niyazov abolished the death penalty by decree. He also granted official human rights to the people, though they were not respected in practice, with his government being criticized as one of the worst human rights violators in the world. Press freedom under Niyazov's leadership was much criticised as it was with other post-Soviet Central Asian states. The Turkmen media constantly doted on the president and helped build his cult of personality.

In 1998, Niyazov closed the Academy of Sciences of Turkmenistan. It was reopened in 2009 after his death by his successor Gurbanguly Berdimuhamedow.

In January 2000, Niyazov inaugurated the Walk of Health to improve the health of his population and forced the members of the government to travel it once a year.

In May 2000, the government revoked all Internet licenses except for the state-owned TürkmenTelekom and in June 2001 shut down all Internet cafés. By 2005, there were 36,000 Internet users in Turkmenistan, representing 0.7% of the population.

In March 2004, 15,000 public health workers were dismissed including nurses, midwives, school health visitors and orderlies. In February 2005, all hospitals outside Ashgabat were ordered to be closed, with the reason being that the sick should come to the capital for treatment. All libraries outside of the capital were also closed, as Niyazov believed that the only books that most Turkmens needed to read were the Quran and his Ruhnama.

In January 2006, one-third of the country's elderly had their pensions discontinued, while another 200,000 had theirs reduced. Pensions received during the prior two years were ordered to be paid back to the state. The Ministry of Foreign Affairs of Turkmenistan strongly denied allegations that the cut in pensions resulted in the deaths of many elderly Turkmens, accusing foreign media outlets of spreading "deliberately perverted" information on the issue. On 19 March 2007, Niyazov's successor Gurbanguly Berdimuhamedow reversed his decision by restoring pensions to more than 100,000 elderly citizens.

==== Presidential pardons ====
In keeping with the Islamic nature of Turkmen society, Niyazov granted pardons each year on the Laylat al-Qadr (Night of Power) in the month of Ramadan.

For example, in 2005, 8,145 convicts were pardoned, including 229 foreign nationals. In 2006 Turkmenistan set free 10,056 prisoners, including 253 foreign nationals from 11 countries. Nyýazow said:

Let this humane act on the part of the state serve strengthening truly moral values of the Turkmen society. Let the entire world know that there has never been a place for evil and violence on the blessed Turkmen soil.

==== Decrees and laws ====
- Niyazov banned the use of lip synching at public concerts in 2005 as well as sound recordings at "musical performances on state holidays, in broadcasts by Turkmen television channels, at all cultural events organized by the state... in places of mass assembly and at weddings and celebrations organised by the public," citing a negative effect on the development of musical arts incurred by the use of recorded music.
- Niyazov declared Turkmenistan a "neutral state" and said that the country would not participate in any UN peacekeeping operations.
- Niyazov banished dogs from the capital Ashgabat because of their "unappealing odour" and banned citizens from owning more than one cat or dog.
- According to the Ashgabat correspondent of Turkmenistan.ru, right-hand-drive imported cars converted to left-hand-drive were banned due to a perceived increased risk in accidents.
- Niyazov wrote the Ruhnama (meaning "the book of the spirit/soul"), and made it mandatory in all schools, in public offices and for obtaining a driver's license, and excerpts from the book were periodically read on Turkmen television. Niyazov even tried to force Mufti Nasrullah ibn Ibadullah to preach the book in the Türkmenbaşy Ruhy Mosque.
- Niyazov ordered that all mountains and places in Turkmenistan be named after Turkmen heroes, poets and leaders.
- Niyazov made the second Sunday of August "Melon Day" in honor of melons, one of his favorite foods, which he referred to as a "gift of God with a glorious history".
- In August 2002, he ordered a renaming of months and days of the week.
- He also abolished the Turkmen word for bread and replaced it with Gurbansoltan, his mother's name.
- Niyazov requested that a "palace of ice", or indoor ice skating rink, be built near the capital, so that those living in the desert country could learn to skate. The rink was built in 2008 and is located near the new Turkmen State Medical University.
- After having to quit smoking in 1997 due to his resultant heart surgery, he banned smoking in all public places and ordered all government employees to follow suit. Chewing tobacco on Turkmen soil was later banned as well.
- He outlawed opera, ballet, circuses and philharmonic orchestras in 2001 for being "decidedly unturkmen-like".
- In February 2004, he decreed that men should no longer wear long hair or beards because of its perceived association with Islamist extremism.
- In March 2004, he fired doctors and gymnastics instructors and replaced them with military conscripts.
- In March 2005, he ordered the closure of all hospitals outside Ashgabat, stating that the sick should go to the capital for treatment.
- Niyazov also ordered the closure of all libraries outside the capital, stating that the reason was that ordinary Turkmens did not read anyway.
- He banned the reporting and even mentioning of contagious diseases such as AIDS or cholera.
- He banned news reporters and presenters from wearing makeup on television. According to some reports, he felt presenters should "appear natural" on-screen, although others alleged that the reason was more eccentric, claiming he said he found it difficult to distinguish male anchors from female anchors.
- He also ordered that each broadcast begin with a pledge that the broadcaster's tongue would shrivel if he/she slanders the country, flag, and/or president.
- He banned car radios because he considered them to be "useless".
- Gold teeth were discouraged in Turkmenistan after Niyazov suggested that the populace chew on bones to strengthen their teeth and lessen the rate at which they fall out. He said:
  I watched young dogs when I was young. They were given bones to gnaw to strengthen their teeth. Those of you whose teeth have fallen out did not chew on bones. This is my advice...
- In November 2005, he ordered that doctors should swear an oath to him instead of the Hippocratic Oath.
- In December 2005, he banned video games because they were "too violent for young Turkmens". In the same month, he ordered the country's oil minister to learn English in 6 months or be fired.

=== Foreign policy ===
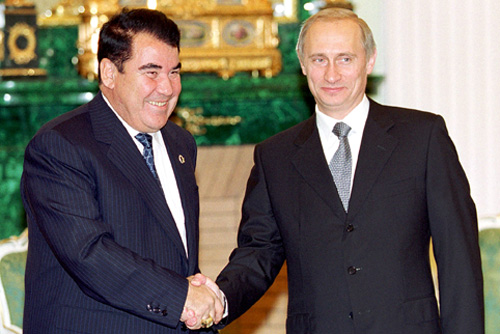
Niyazov with Russian President Vladimir Putin in the Moscow Kremlin, June 2000

Niyazov promoted a policy of strict neutrality in foreign affairs, refraining from seeking membership in NATO or GUAM and almost ignoring the CSTO. Turkmenistan has not participated in any United Nations peacekeeping missions. It has however become a member of Interpol.

The full independence of Turkmenistan was recognised by a UN General Assembly resolution "The permanent neutrality of Turkmenistan" of 12 December 1995. As a result, in 2005 Turkmenistan would downgrade its links with the Commonwealth of Independent States becoming only an associate member under article 8 of the CIS charter, as such it would not participate in any of the military structures of the CIS.

In 2006, the European Commission and the international trade committee of the European Parliament voted to grant Turkmenistan "most favoured nation" trading status with the European Union, widely seen as motivated by interest in natural gas, after Niyazov announced he would enter a "human rights dialogue" with the EU.

In January 1996, Niyazov met with Sayid Abdulloh Nuri in Tehran to inform him that the attendees of a CIS summit in Moscow had agreed to renew the mandate of CIS peacekeepers in Tajikistan, which was going through a civil war at the time.

== Opposition ==
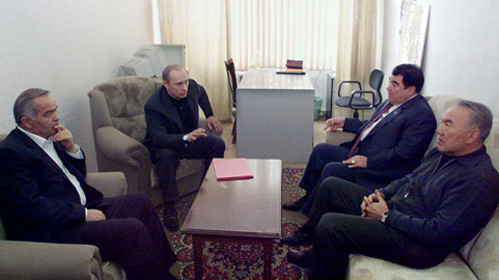
Uzbek president I. Karimov, Russia's V. Putin, S. Niyazov and N. Nazarbaev of Kazakhstan in 2002

On 25 November 2002, Niyazov's motorcade was fired upon at about 7 a.m. in downtown Ashgabat as he was traveling to his office from his official residence in Arçabil. Niyazov claimed that it was an attempt at a coup, and as a result, the Turkmen government arrested thousands of suspected conspirators and members of their families. Among the figures who were arrested/purged were former Foreign Ministers Boris Şyhmyradow and Batyr Berdiýew, as well as Major Begenç Beknazarow of the Turkmen Ground Forces and Chief of the General Staff Lieutenant General Serdar Çaryýarow. Critics claim the government staged the attempt to crack down on mounting domestic and foreign political opposition. Ethnic Russians in Turkmenistan were disproportionately targeted in the aftermath.

The summer of 2004 saw a leaflet campaign in the capital, Ashgabat, calling for the overthrow and trial of Niyazov. The authorities were unable to stop the campaign and the President responded by firing his Interior minister and director of the police academy on national television. He accused the minister of incompetence and declared: "I cannot say that you had any great merits or did much to combat crime."

Niyazov later announced that surveillance cameras were to be placed at all major streets and sites in Turkmenistan, an apparent precaution against future attempts.

== Cult of personality ==
The rotating statue of Niyazov

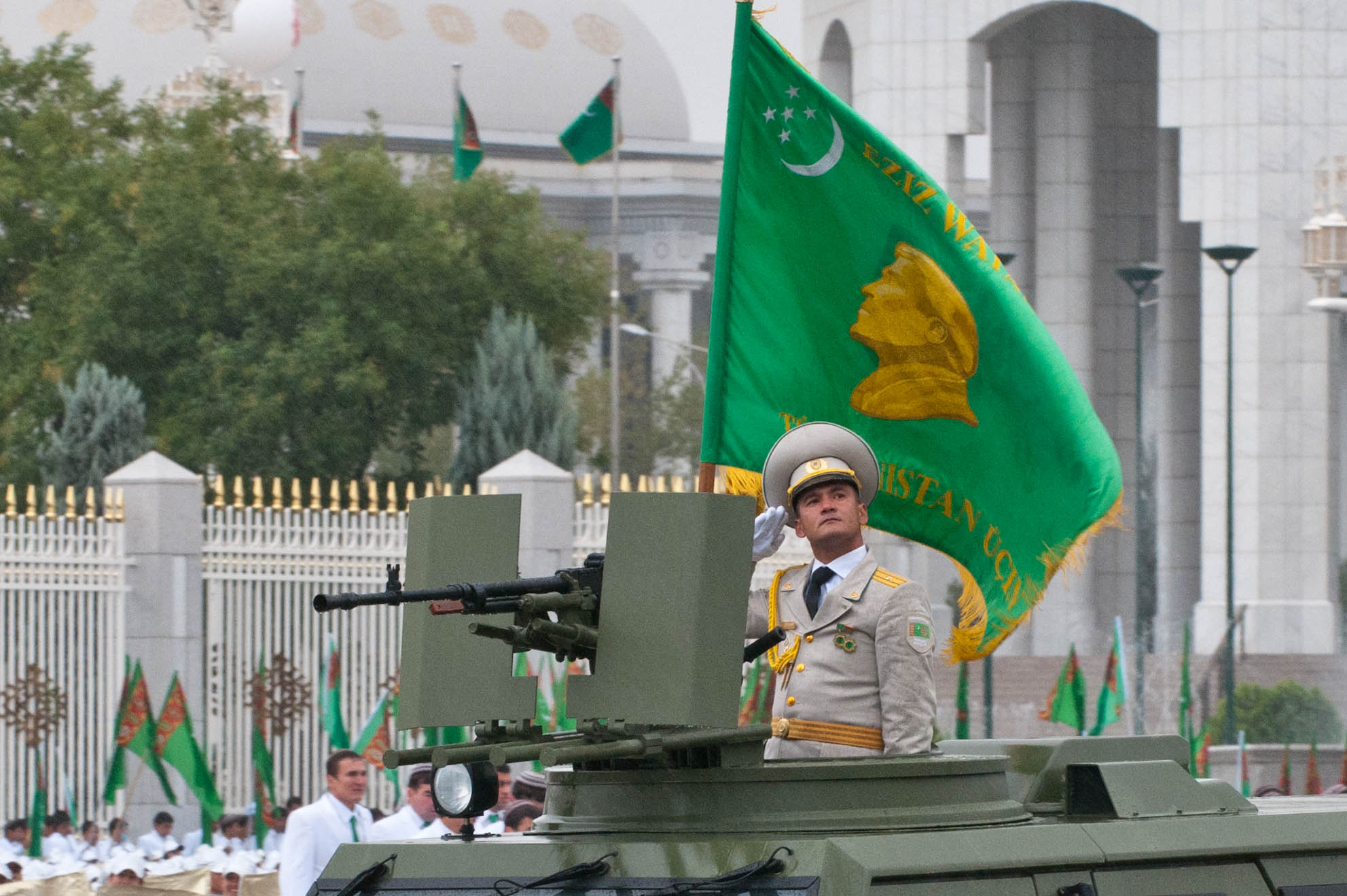
Niyazov in profile on Turkmenistan army flag

Niyazov became a substitute for the vacuum left by the downfall of the communist system, with his image replacing those of Marx and Lenin. During his rule, Niyazov created a strong cult of personality around himself, which resembled the one around the Kim dynasty in North Korea and the Gaddafi regime in Libya. He renamed the town of Jaňga and city of Krasnovodsk after his nickname Türkmenbaşy, and renamed schools, airports, Ashgabat streets, and even a meteorite after himself and members of his family. The city of Kerki was renamed for his father, and city of Ýylanly for his mother. The doting actions of the official Turkmen media supported his cult of personality. The government renamed the months and most days of the week after symbols Niyazov wrote about. The national anthem of Turkmenistan referred to him. According to the newspaper Neytralny Turkmenistan physicians were ordered to swear an oath to the President, replacing the Hippocratic Oath.

Statues and portraits of him were put everywhere throughout the country. In Ashgabat, he erected a rotating, $12 million, golden statue of himself that always faces the sun. Niyazov gave every citizen a watch with his portrait in its dial.

Niyazov simultaneously cut funding to and partially disassembled the education system in the name of "reform", while injecting ideological indoctrination into it by requiring all schools to use his own book, the Ruhnama, as their primary text. He also made it mandatory to read the Ruhnama in schools, universities and governmental organizations, new governmental employees were tested on the book at job interviews and an exam on its teachings was a part of the driving test in Turkmenistan. Turkmen State University even had a "Department of the Holy Ruhnama of Türkmenbaşy the Great", and Ruhnama Studies were pursued as a major research agenda in the country, often at the cost of academic disciplines. Nyýazow claimed those who read it thrice were destined for heaven. Like Kim Il Sung and Muammar Gaddafi, there is even a creation myth surrounding him.

During Niyazov's presidency, there was no freedom of the press nor was there freedom of speech. This further meant that opposition to Niyazov was strictly forbidden and major opposition figures were imprisoned, institutionalized, deported, or fled the country, and their family members were routinely harassed by the authorities. A silhouette of Niyazov was used as a logo on television broadcasts. The eccentric nature of some of his decrees, and the vast number of images of the president led to the perception, especially in Western countries, of a despotic leader, rich on oil wealth glorifying himself whilst the population gained no benefit. For these, and other reasons, the US government said that by the time he died, "Nyýazow's personality cult ... had reached the dimensions of a state-imposed religion."

== Death ==
Mausoleum of Saparmurat Niyazov

On the afternoon of 21 December 2006, Turkmen state television announced that President Saparmurat Niyazov had died of a sudden heart attack in the early morning hours at around 01:10 local time at his residence, the Türkmenbaşy Palace, age 66. One month prior to his death, Niyazov had publicly announced that he had been taking heart medication for the past few years for an unidentified cardiac condition. The Turkmen Embassy in Moscow later confirmed this report.

Because Niyazov named no successor, according to the law of the Constitution of Turkmenistan, Öwezgeldi Ataýew, the chairman of the Assembly, would assume the presidency. Vice President Gurbanguly Berdimuhamedow was named as head of the commission organizing the state funeral. However, Ataýew was arrested on that same day and Berdimuhamedow was subsequently named acting president. Berdimuhamedow and the People's Council announced on 26 December 2006 that the next presidential elections would be held on 11 February 2007 to elect Nyýazow's successor. On 11 February 2007, Berdimuhamedow was elected with 89% of the vote, and was sworn in as president immediately afterwards.

The circumstances of Niyazov's death have been surrounded by some media speculation. Some Turkmen opposition sources also claim that Niyazov died on 14 December, a week before the officially announced date.

Foreign news reports also claimed that Niyazov also suffered from ischemic heart disease and kidney failure due to being overweight and overindulgence of alcohol.

== Funeral and burial ==
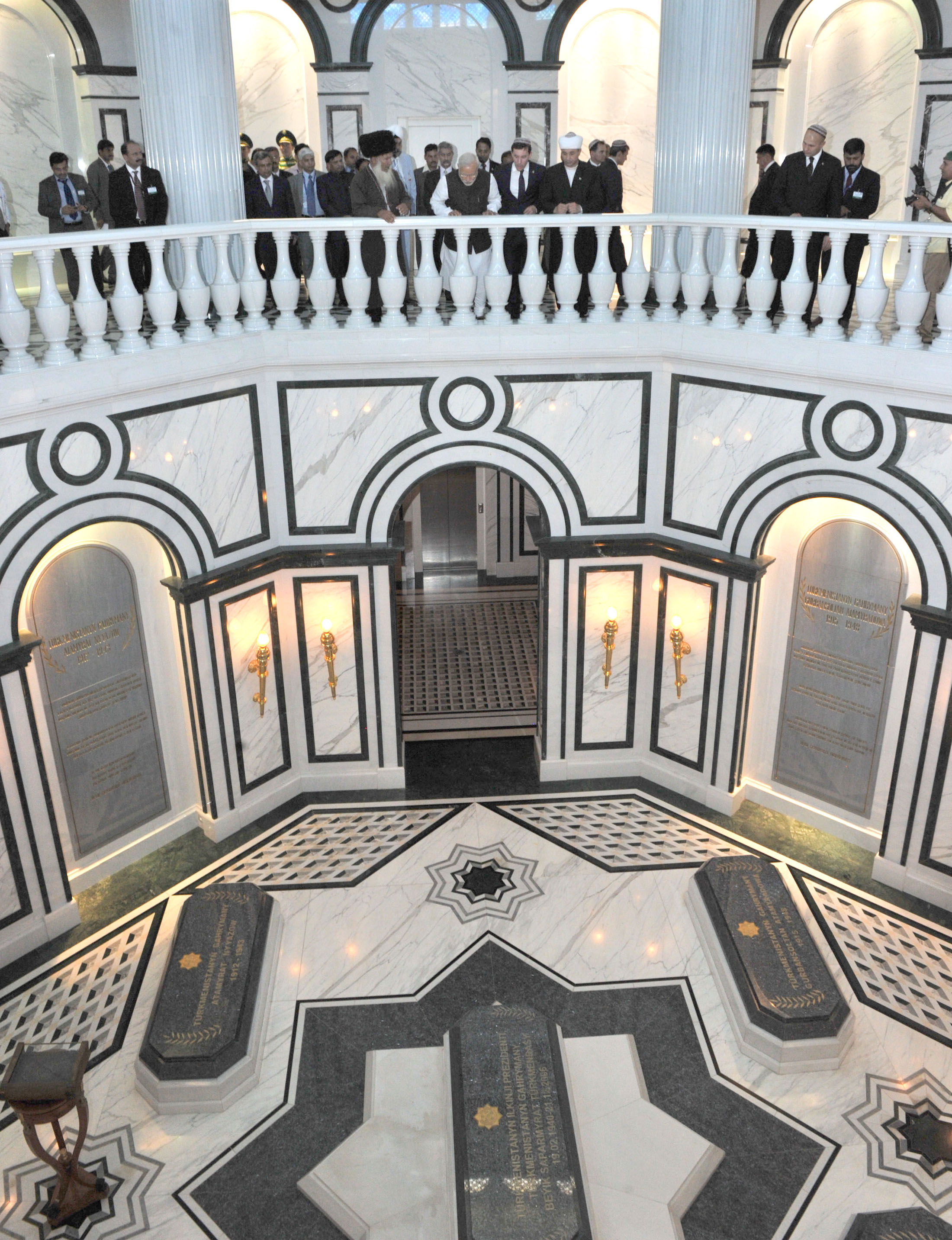
Tomb of Niyazov (center) and his parents in Ashgabat

Niyazov was buried in his ready-prepared tomb in Gypjak Mosque on 24 December at his home village, approximately 7 kilometres (4 mi) west of Ashgabat. Prior to being moved to the village, Niyazov's body lay in state in an open coffin in the presidential palace from 9 am to 12 midday. Many mourners, including foreign delegations, passed by the coffin in a three-hour period. Many of the ordinary citizens wept dramatically as they walked, some even clinging to the coffin and fainting. The Turkmen Air Force patrolled the funeral cortege as part of the farewell of the Armed Forces of Turkmenistan. A prayer took place before the burial, with the Chief Mufti reading Jyn Aza. As he was buried, the national anthem was played, accompanied by a 21-gun salute, symbolizing the number of years during which he was in power.

== Legacy ==
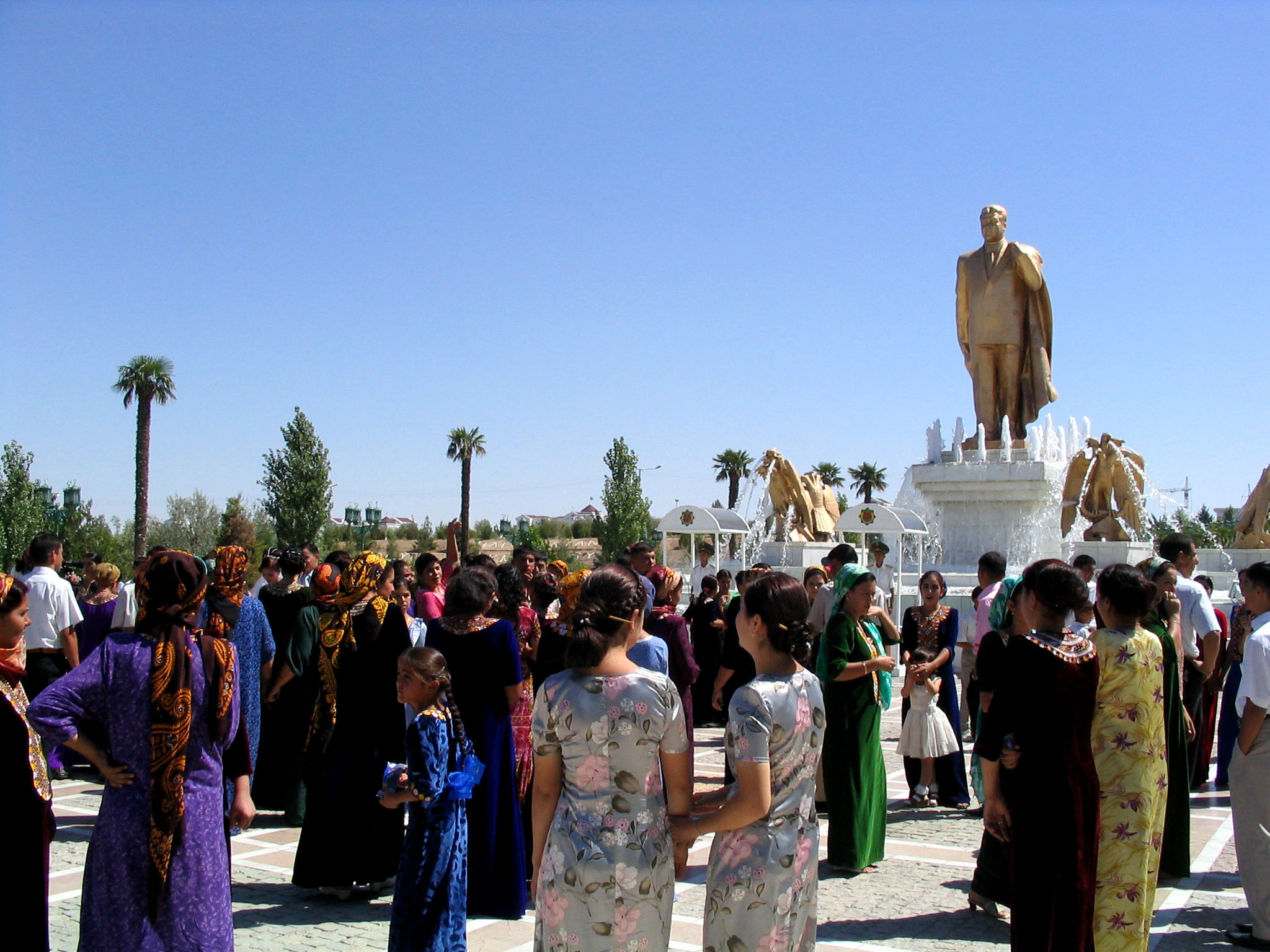
Golden statue of Saparmurat Niyazov in Ashgabat

After Niyazov's death, his successor as president, Gurbanguly Berdimuhamedow, began to remove some eccentric features of Niyazov's personality cult. In 2008, less than two years after Niyazov's death, the names of months and days of the week changed by Niyazov were restored, and reference in the National Anthem of Turkmenistan to Niyazov was replaced with "the people". By that year, the old Constitution of Turkmenistan, adopted during Niyazov's presidency and codifying Niyazov's primacy, was replaced, and the government launched a democratization program.

Berdimuhamedow also trimmed official references to Niyazov's biographical book, Ruhnama, in Spring 2007, and around 2009–10, television broadcasts of Ruhnama stopped. By 2011, Berdimuhamedow's government rescinded the requirement to pass a secondary-school examination on the book and in 2014, it was finally declared that Turkmenistani universities would no longer test applicants on their knowledge of the book. Displaying and keeping the book alongside the Quran in mosques were also stopped, except in Türkmenbaşy Ruhy Mosque.

Some statues and portraits placed around the country were also removed. The Arch of Neutrality, the rotating golden statue of Niyazov, was moved from downtown Ashgabat to the southern edge of the city on 26 August 2010. Newly issued Turkmenistani manat banknotes did not feature his portrait.

However, Saparmurat Niyazov has remained a celebrated figure in Turkmenistan. His birthday is designated as a national day (not an official holiday), called "Türkmenbaşy Remembrance Day". Some of his creations remain unchanged, including the celebration of Melon Day.

Several places still bear his name, including the city of Türkmenbaşy and the nearby town of Türkmenbaşy, as well as several villages. In November 2022, however, the cities of Nyýazow, Gurbansoltan Eje, and Serdar were renamed Şabat, Andalyp, and Gyzylarbat respectively. A park in Turkey is named after him. The Turkmen Agricultural University is named after him, as is the Great Saparmyrat Türkmenbaşy Military Institute.

Niyazov and his wife, Muza Melnikova, who was of Russian and Jewish descent, had two children, a son named Myrat and a daughter named Irina. Both maintained a distance from politics after their father's death.

== Notes ==
Party political offices
Preceded by Muhammetnazar Gapurow	First Secretary of the Communist Party of the Turkmen SSR; 1985–1991	Position abolished
New political party	Leader of the Democratic Party of Turkmenistan; 1991–2006	Succeeded by Gurbanguly Berdimuhamedow
Political offices
New office	President of Turkmenistan; 1990–2006	Succeeded by Gurbanguly Berdimuhamedow
