= International Passenger Bus Terminal of Ashgabat =

Bus stop in Turkmenistan

General information
- Location: Ashgabat; Turkmenistan
- Coordinates: 38.0285972°N 58.4047905°E
- System: bus service
- Bus stands: 324

Construction
- Structure type: At-grade
- Parking: yes
- Cycle facilities: no

History
- Opened: September 5, 2014

Passengers
- 2,000 daily
Location

International Passenger Bus Terminal of Ashgabat (Aşgabat şäherindäki halkara ýolagçy awtomenzili), is the main bus station of Ashgabat, Turkmenistan. Located in the north of the city, it was opened on 5 September 2014. It is the largest bus station in Turkmenistan.

== History ==
In 2012, the city of Ashgabat decided to build an international passenger bus station which would be able to serve up to a few dozen long-distance and suburban bus routes. To do this, a site was chosen in the northern part of Ashgabat. The bus station was commissioned on September 5, 2014. Construction was carried out by Turkmen construction company Muhammet-Balkan.

== Specifications ==
The bus station building is located in the northern part of Ashgabat, along the Ashgabat-Dashoguz trail. It serves 2,000 passengers per day. The terminal has a 324 platforms. There are routes connecting to the city of Turkmenistan, as well as routes to neighboring countries and the CIS countries.

Located inside the terminal waiting room are amenities for passengers. These include cash registers, cash for the purchase of air and rail tickets, a currency exchange, a post office, an internet cafe, a restaurant, convenience stores, a changing area, a clinic, a pharmacy, luggage storage, and a small cinema. The structure of the terminal includes a fire station, a modern car wash for buses, and various services. Bus designs adorn a mini park, that also includes a fountain. Near the bus station is a Silk Road hotel with 50 rooms, an office building, technical units, stop building service and car. For increased security of passengers and their belongings, video surveillance, security, and baggage service are provided. A covered parking area near the bus station is 1,280 square metres (13,800 ft^{2}).
