= Paýtagt Shopping Center =

Turkmen shopping center and business tower

Coordinates: 37°53′39.22″N 58°23′23.55″E

Paytagt Shopping Center is an 80-meter-high (260 ft) shopping center and business tower located in the south-east Ashgabat, Turkmenistan. The building was designed and constructed by Turkish "Polimeks" in 2005. It consists of a 3-story base and 21-story tower.
