= List of historic sites of Japan (Fukui) =

This list is of the historic sites of Japan located within the Prefecture of Fukui.

== National Historic Sites ==
As of 1 September 2019, twenty-five Sites have been designated as being of national significance (including one *Special Historic Site); Genbao Castle Site spans the prefectural borders with Shiga.

Site	Municipality	Comments	Image	Coordinates	Type	Ref.
*Ichijōdani Asakura Family Site 一乗谷朝倉氏遺跡 Ichijōdani Asakura-shi iseki	Fukui	Sengoku period fortified settlement	Ichijōdani Asakura Family Site	36°00′05″N 136°17′49″E	2, 3, 6, 8	00003445
Ōzan Kofun Cluster 王山古墳群 Ōzan kofun-gun	Sabae	Kofun period tumuli cluster	Ōzan Kofun Cluster	35°56′22″N 136°11′06″E	1	1063
Okozu Salt Works 岡津製塩遺跡 Okozu seien iseki	Obama	Kofun to Nara period saltworks	Okozu Salt Works	35°28′54″N 135°39′20″E	6	1070
Shimofunazuka Kofun 下船塚古墳 Shimofunazuka kofun	Wakasa	Kofun period tumulus	Shimofunazuka Kofun	35°28′16″N 135°48′51″E	1	1059
Kabutoyama Kofun 兜山古墳 Kabutoyama kofun	Sabae	Kofun period tumulus	Kabutoyama Kofun	35°58′28″N 136°11′00″E	1	1068
Maruoka Domain Battery Site 丸岡藩砲台跡 Maruoka-han hōdai ato	Sakai	Bakumatsu period fortification	Maruoka Domain Battery Site	36°15′13″N 136°09′15″E	2	1037
Yoshizaki-gobō Site 吉崎御坊跡 Yoshizaki-gobō ato	Awara	Sengoku period temple ruins	Yoshizaki-gobō Site	36°17′15″N 136°15′03″E	3	1064
Kanagasaki Castle Site 金ヶ崎城跡 Kanagasaki-jō ato	Tsuruga	Kamakura to Nanboku-chō period castle ruins	Kanagasaki Castle Site	35°39′54″N 136°04′29″E	2	1046
Nochiseyama Castle Site 後瀬山城跡 Nochiseyama-jō ato	Obama	Sengoku period castle ruins	Nochiseyama Castle Site	35°29′17″N 135°44′20″E	2	1074
Wakasa Kokubun-ji Site 若狭国分寺跡 Wakasa Kokubun-ji ato	Obama	Nara period temple ruins	Wakasa Kokubunji Site	35°28′50″N 135°47′18″E	3	1065
Obama Domain Battery Sites 小浜藩台場跡 Obama-han daiba ato	Ōi	Bakumatsu period fortification; designation includes the Matsugase Battery (松ヶ瀬台場跡) and Nokogirizaki Battery (鋸崎台場跡)	Obama Domain Battery Sites	35°31′58″N 135°39′57″E	2	3279
Matsuoka Kofun Cluster 松岡古墳群 Matsuoka kofun-gun	Eiheiji	Kofun period tumuli; designation includes Tegurigajōyama Kofun (手繰ヶ城山古墳), Ishifuneyama Kofun (石舟山古墳), Torigoeyama Kofun (鳥越山古墳), and Nihonmatsu Kofun (二本松山古墳)	Matsuoka Kofun Cluster	36°05′34″N 136°18′55″E	1	1069
Jōnozuka Kofun 上ノ塚古墳 Jōnozuka Kofun	Wakasa	Kofun period tumulus	Jōnozuka Kofun	35°28′05″N 135°52′28″E	1	1056
Kamifunazuka Kofun 上船塚古墳 Kamifunazuka kofun	Wakasa	Kofun period tumulus	Kamifunazuka Kofun	35°28′13″N 135°48′51″E	1	1058
Nishizuka Kofun 西塚古墳 Nishizuka kofun	Wakasa	Kofun period tumulus	Nishizuka Kofun	35°28′07″N 135°52′24″E	1	1055
Nakagō Kofun Cluster 中郷古墳群 Nakagō kofun-gun	Tsuruga	Kofun period tumulus	Nakago Kofun Cluster	35°38′08″N 136°05′09″E	1	1072
Nakatsuka Kofun 中塚古墳 Nakatsuka kofun	Wakasa	Kofun period tumulus	Nakatsuka Kofun	35°28′02″N 135°52′33″E	1	1057
Tōmyōji Nitta Yoshisada Legendary War Memorial 燈明寺畷新田義貞戦歿伝説地 Tōmyōji nawate Nitta Yoshisada senbotsu densetsu-chi	Fukui	Nanboku-chō period relics	Tōmyōji Nitta Yoshisada Legendary War Memorial	36°05′18″N 136°12′33″E	8	1032
Heisen-ji Former Precinct 白山平泉寺旧境内 Hakusan Heisenji kyū-keidai	Katsuyama	Nara to Sengoku period temple ruins	Hakusan Heisenji Former Precinct	36°02′38″N 136°32′31″E	3	1053
Grave of Takeda Kōunsai and his Followers 武田耕雲斎等墓 Takeda Kōunsai tō no haka	Tsuruga	Bakumatsu period relics	Takeda Kōunsai Grave	35°39′04″N 136°03′27″E	7	1049
Mendorinagayama Kofun 免鳥長山古墳 Mendorinagayama kofun	Fukui	Kofun period tumulus	Mendorinagayama Kofun	36°07′43″N 136°04′44″E	1	00003568
Rokuroseyama Kofun Cluster 六呂瀬山古墳群 Rokuroseyama kofun-gun	Sakai	Kofun period tumuli	Rokuroseyama Kofun Cluster	36°07′03″N 136°18′56″E	1	1073
Somayama Castle Site 杣山城跡 Somayama-jō ato	Minamiechizen	Nanboku-chō to Sengoku period castle ruins	Somayama Castle Site	35°48′18″N 136°13′07″E	2	1047
Genbao Castle Site 玄藩尾城（内中尾山城）跡 Genbao-jō (Uchinakaoyama-jō) ato	Tsuruga	Sengoku period castle ruins; designation extends into Shiga Prefecture	Genbao Castle Site	35°35′51″N 136°10′23″E	2	3329
Kōdōji temple ruins 興道寺廃寺跡 Kōdōji haiji ato	Mihama	Nara period temple ruins		35°35′55″N 135°56′38″E	3	00004022

== Prefectural Historic Sites ==
As of 1 May 2019, twenty-nine Sites have been designated as being of prefectural importance.

Site	Municipality	Comments	Image	Coordinates	Type	Ref.
Mimuro Site 三室遺跡; Mimuro iseki	Katsuyama			36°02′19″N 136°29′49″E		
Chausuyama Kofun Cluster 茶臼山古墳群; Chausuyama kofun-gun	Echizen			35°53′32″N 136°09′05″E		
Asuwayama Kofun Cluster 足羽山古墳群; Asuwayama kofun-gun	Fukui			36°03′04″N 136°12′03″E		
Kitabori Shell Mound 北堀貝塚; Kitabori kaizuka	Fukui			36°08′36″N 136°06′49″E		
Hikida Castle Site 疋壇城跡; Hikida-jō ato	Tsuruga			35°35′59″N 136°06′00″E		
Asahiyama Kofun Cluster 朝日山古墳群; Asahiyama kofun-gun	Echizen			35°58′21″N 136°07′18″E		
Kasugayama Kofun 春日山古墳 附 泰遠寺山古墳出土石棺; Kasugayama kofun tsuketari Taionjiyama kofun shutsudo sekkan	Eiheiji	the designation includes the stone coffin from Taionjiyama Kofun		36°05′15″N 136°18′06″E		
Obama Castle Site 小浜城跡; Obama-jō	Obama			35°30′14″N 135°44′46″E		
Komaru Castle Site 小丸城跡（附 野々宮廃寺跡） Komaru-jō (tsuketari Nonomiya Haiji ato)	Echizen	the designation includes the site of Nonomiya Haiji		35°53′53″N 136°13′49″E		
Tsuchimikado Family Graves 土御門家墓所; Tsuchimikado-ke bosho	Ōi			35°23′49″N 135°35′23″E		
Echizen Ōno Castle Site 越前大野城跡; Echizen Ōno-jō ato	Ōno			35°59′11″N 136°29′00″E		
Kiyohara Bukata Grave 清原宜賢卿墓所; Kiyohara Bukata-kyō bosho	Fukui			35°58′51″N 136°12′31″E		
Nitta Yoshisada Public Grave 新田義貞公墓所; Nitta Yoshisada kō-bosho	Sakai	at Shōnen-ji (称念寺)		36°08′38″N 136°15′06″E		
Yokoyama Kofun Cluster 横山古墳群; Yokoyama kofun-gun	Awara/Sakai			36°10′36″N 136°16′53″E		
Kamo Kofun 加茂古墳; Kamo kofun	Obama			35°29′18″N 135°49′50″E		
Shinmeigatani Sue Ware Kiln Site 神明ヶ谷の須恵器窯跡; Shinmeigatani no Sue-ki kama ato	Echizen			35°55′30″N 136°03′40″E		
Ōmushi Haiji Pagoda Site 大虫廃寺塔跡; Ōmushi Haiji tō ato	Echizen			35°53′57″N 136°08′32″E		
Funazu Shell Mound 舟津貝塚; Funazu kaizuka	Awara			36°13′45″N 136°11′35″E		
Ochi-san Sacred Mountain Site 越知山山岳信仰跡; Ochi-san sangaku-shinkō ato	Echizen			35°59′51″N 136°01′56″E		
Kunugi Kofun 椚古墳（石室） Kunugi kofun (sekishitsu)	Awara			36°11′55″N 136°16′55″E		
Jūzen-no-Mori Kofun 十善の森古墳; Jūzen-no-mori kofun	Wakasa			35°27′47″N 135°50′31″E		
Anajizō Kofun 穴地蔵古墳; Anajizō kofun	Tsuruga			35°39′27″N 136°02′22″E		
Mitakeyama Kofun Cluster 御葺山古墳群; Mitakeyama kofun-gun	Fukui			36°00′47″N 136°17′40″E		
Oshiroyama Kofun お城山古墳; Oshiroyama kofun	Fukui			36°02′02″N 136°08′28″E		
Tatebora Kofun No.2 立洞古墳（二号墳） Tatebora kofun (nigō-fun)	Tsuruga			35°38′37″N 136°05′20″E		
Nishitani Site 西谷遺跡; Nishitani iseki	Sakai			36°13′45″N 136°09′44″E		
Senzoku Ichirizuka 千束一里塚; Senzoku ichirizuka	Awara			36°15′14″N 136°14′54″E		
Suzaki High Tōrō 洲崎の高燈籠; Suzaki-no-takatōrō	Tsuruga			35°39′28″N 136°03′54″E		
Hatano Castle Site 波多野城跡; Hatano-jō ato	Eiheiji			36°04′37″N 136°20′52″E		

== Municipal Historic Sites ==
As of 1 May 2019, a further two hundred and seven Sites have been designated as being of municipal importance.

Site	Municipality	Comments	Image	Coordinates	Type	Ref.
Kashimagari Tunnel 樫曲トンネル kashimagari tonneru	Tsuruga					

== See also ==
- Cultural Properties of Japan
- Wakasa Province
- Echizen Province
- Fukui Prefectural Museum of Cultural History
- List of Places of Scenic Beauty of Japan (Fukui)
- List of Cultural Properties of Japan - historical materials (Fukui)
- List of Cultural Properties of Japan - paintings (Fukui)
