= Anajizō Kofun =

Kofun period burial mound in Tsuruga, Fukui, Japan

- 穴地蔵古墳 (Japanese)
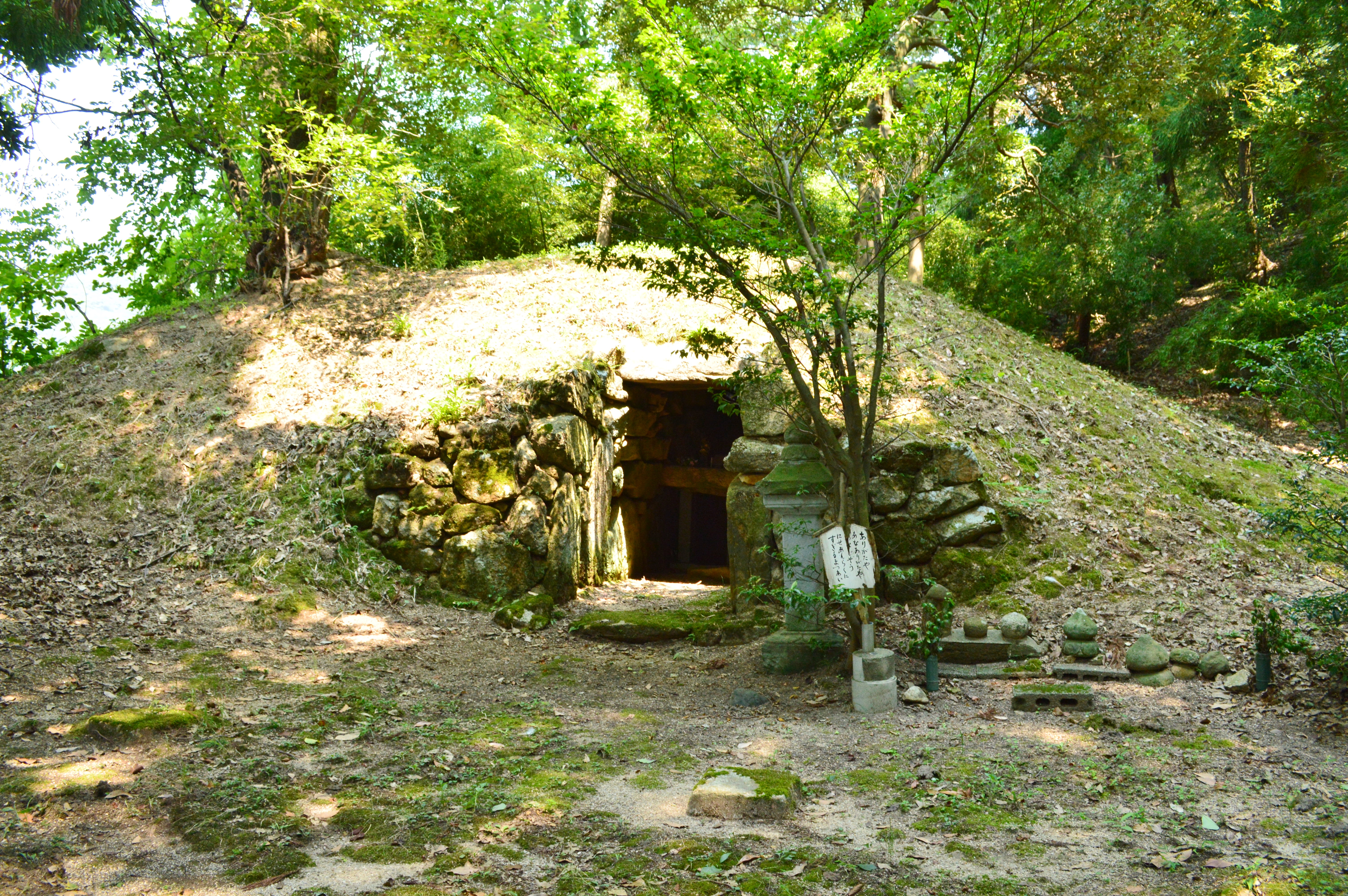
- Anajizō Kofun

- Anajizō Kofun Anajizō Kofun (Japan)
- 35°39′27.00″N 136°2′22.25″E
- Type: Kofun
- Periods: Kofun period
- Location: Kushikawa, Tsuruga, Fukui, Japan
- Region: Hokuriku region

History
- Built: mid 7th century

Site notes
- Public access: Yes (no facilities)
- Fukui Prefecture Historic Site

Anajizō Kofun (穴地蔵古墳) is a Kofun period burial mound, located in the Kushikawa neighborhood of the city of Tsuruga, Fukui in the Hokuriku region of Japan. The tumulus was designated a Fukui Prefecture Historic Site in 1978.

== Overview ==
The Anajizō Kofun is a enpun (円墳)-style round tumulus, with a diameter of 11-12 meters and height of 3.5 meters. This tumulus was constructed on the southern foot of Mount Hanajiri, at the western edge of Matsubara Park, at the base of the Tsuruga Peninsula in central Fukui Prefecture. Three circular tumuli, including this one, are distributed in the surrounding area and are recognized as the Anajizō Tumulus Group. Most of the mound has been leveled, and an archaeological excavation was conducted in 2000.

The burial chamber is a horizontal-entry stone chamber without side chambers, opening to the southeast. It is 3.7 meters long and two meters high, and the connecting corridor is currently 4.9 meters long, but may have originally been up to seven meters in length. The burial chamber exhibits a distinctive feature: a 1.9 meter deep stone shelf attached to the back wall. Stone shelves are mostly found in the tumulus groups of Wakayama Prefecture, so its presence here (and in two other tumuli on the Tsuruga Peninsula are thought to indicate some ancient maritime connection with the Kii Peninsula. Grave goods, including iron horse trappings, Sue ware and Haji ware pottery have been unearthed from within the chamber. From these artifacts, the construction period is estimated to be the early to mid-7th century, towards the end of the Kofun period.

Three stone statues of Jizō Bosatsu are enshrined on the shelf (the origin of the burial mound's name, "Anajizō"), one of which bears an inscription from Eishō 15 (1518). Until the beginning of the Meiji era, a small Buddhist chapel existed in front of the opening to the burial chamber, which was used as chapel. This chapel was the 72nd temple of the Wakasa-Echizen New Shikoku 88 Temple Pilgrimage, a replica of the Shikoku Pilgrimage dating from around 1851, but based on worship of Jizō. The chapel was demolished during the haibutsu kishaku anti-Buddhist movement of the early Meiji period.

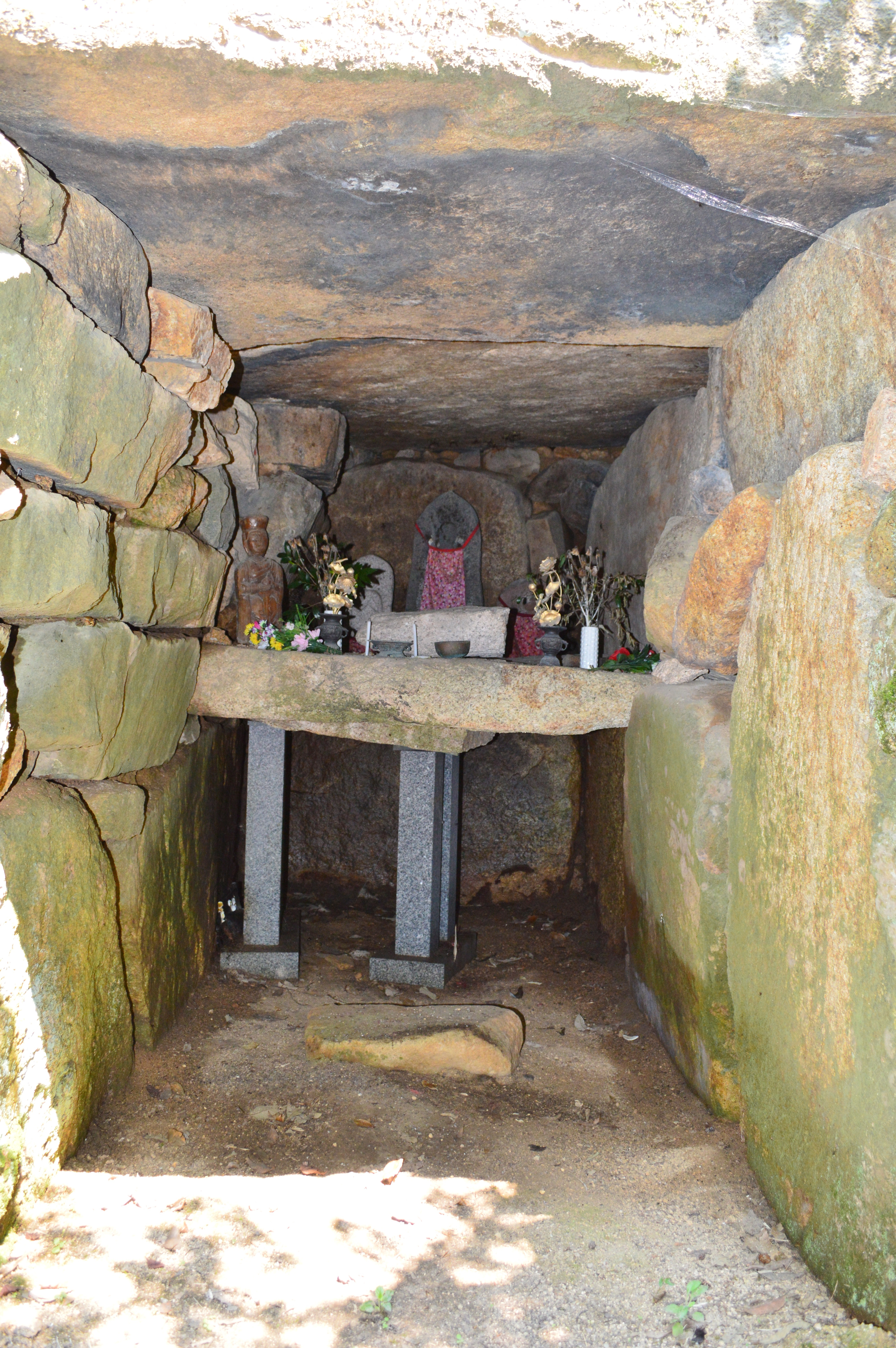
Burial chamber

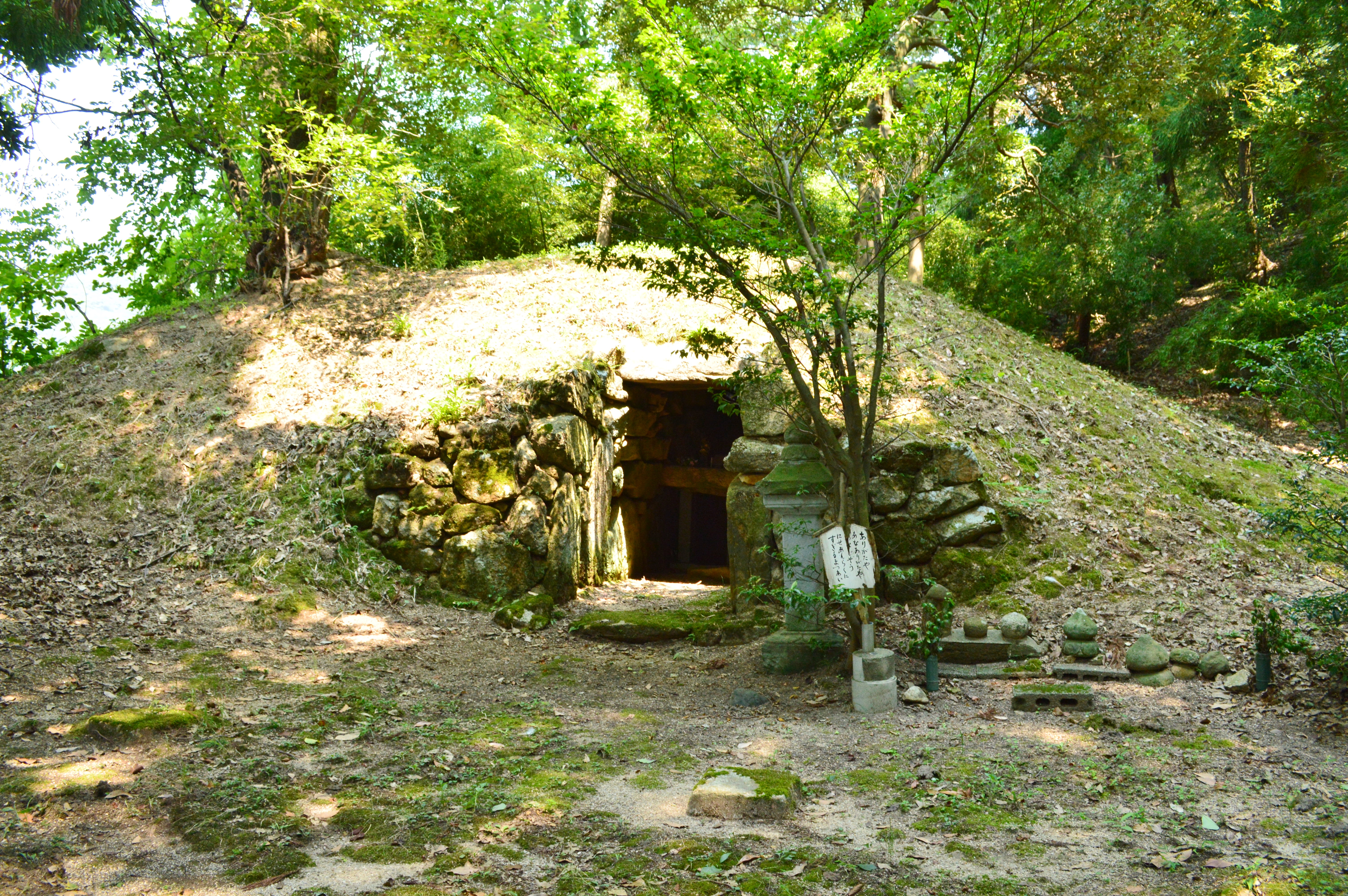
Tumulus

== See also ==
- List of Historic Sites of Japan (Fukui)
