= Mendorinagayama Kofun =

Burial mound in Japan

- 免鳥長山古墳 (Japanese)
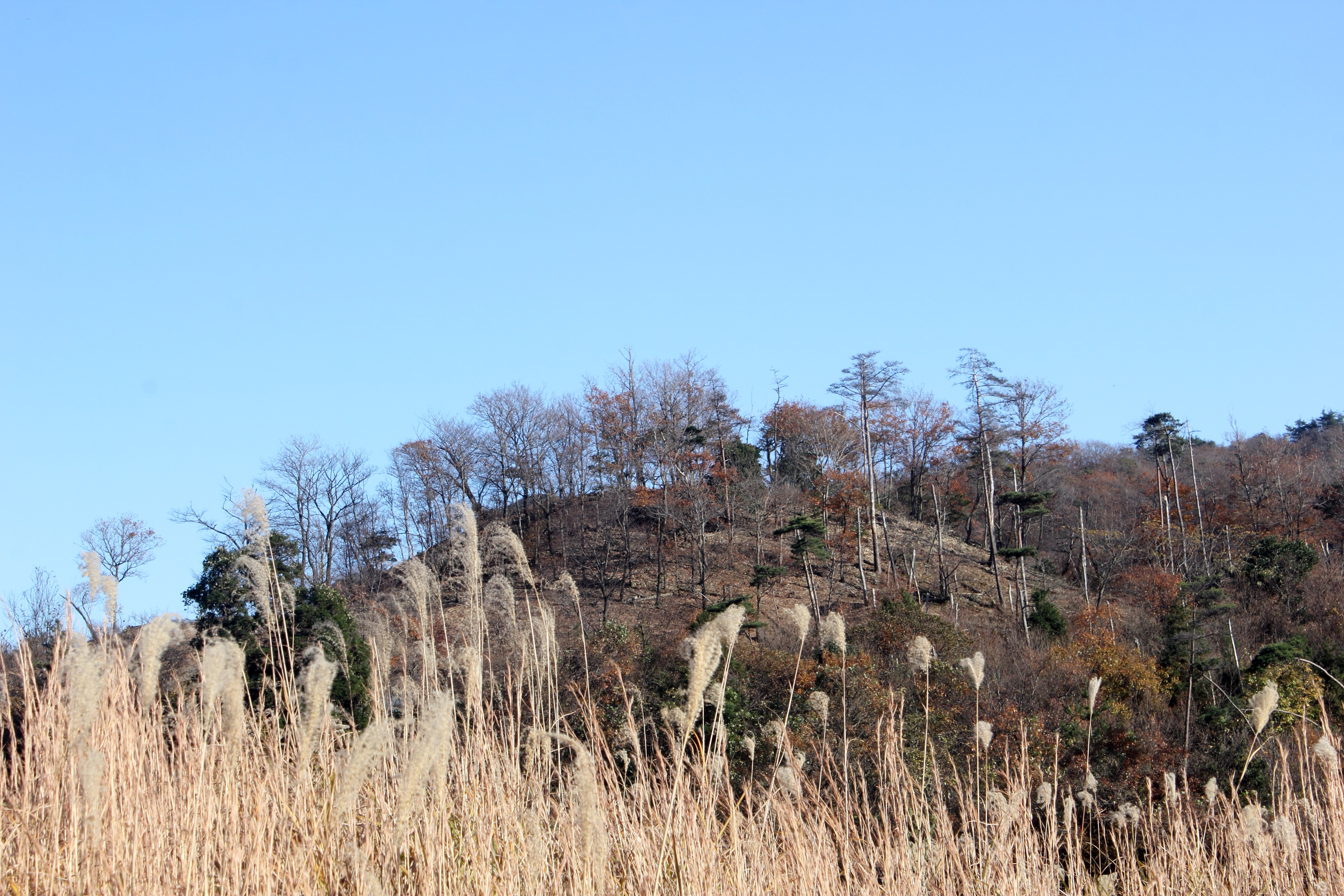
- Mendorinagayama Kofun

- Mendorinagayama Kofun Mendorinagayama Kofun (Japan)
- 36°07′43.9″N 136°04′42.9″E
- Type: kofun cluster
- Periods: Kofun period
- Location: Tsuruga, Fukui, Japan
- Region: Hokuriku region

History
- Built: 5th century AD

Site notes
- Public access: Yes (no facilities)

The Mendorinagayama Kofun (免鳥長山古墳) is a kofun burial mound located in the Medori neighborhood of the city of Fukui in the Hokuriku region of Japan. The site was designated a National Historic Site of Japan in 2008.

== Overview ==
The Mendorinagayama Kofun is one of a cluster of tumuli located on a hillside approximately 900 meters from the Sea of Japan coast. The cluster consists of five tumuli, of which only the largest is a scallop-shaped tumulus (帆立貝形古墳, hotategai-gata kofun) and is protected by the National Historic Site designation. The remaining tumuli in the site are all circular-type (empun (円墳)) kofun.

The largest of the group is Mendori No.5, which dates to the mid-5th century AD. The top was originally faced with fukiishi stones and had cylindrical haniwa. It has two horizontal burial chambers, but was robbed in ancient times. It was excavated from 2001 to 2006, and found to have two rectangular protrusions on its posterior domed portion. With the tumulus, fragments of a boat-shaped stone sarcophagus made of local tuff and a decorated lid with a design of triangular and circular patterns, and fragmentary grave goods, including cylindrical and magatama beads have been found. Similar large-scale tombs of powerful local chieftains have been found in the Echizen area, but as a rule only in inland regions, such as the Rokuroseyama Kofun Cluster and the Matsuoka Kofun Cluster. This tomb is one of the largest of its type in the Hokuriku region, and is unusual in that the larger kofun found in Echizen Province were all located in the eastern end of the Fukui Plain along the basin of the Kuzuryu River, and only this one is located so close to the coast. It is located about 50 minutes by car from Fukui Station on the JR West Hokuriku Main Line.

== The site ==
- Mendori No.1: This is a circular tumulus from the 5th century, with a diameter of 38 meters.
- Mendori No.2: This is a circular tumulus from the 5th century, with a diameter of 20 meters. Its opening has been open since ancient times, and per local folklore was a hideout for pirates.
- Mendori No.3: This is a circular tumulus from the 5th century, with a diameter of 35 meters.
- Mendori No.4: This is a circular tumulus from the 5th century, with a diameter of 28 meters.
- Mendori No.5: Also called the Mendorinagayama kofun: This is a scallop-shaped tumulus from the 5th century, with a length of 90.5 meters

== See also ==
- List of Historic Sites of Japan (Fukui)
