= Jūzen-no-Mori Kofun =

Kofun period burial mound in Wakasa, Fukui, Japan

- 十善の森古 (Japanese)
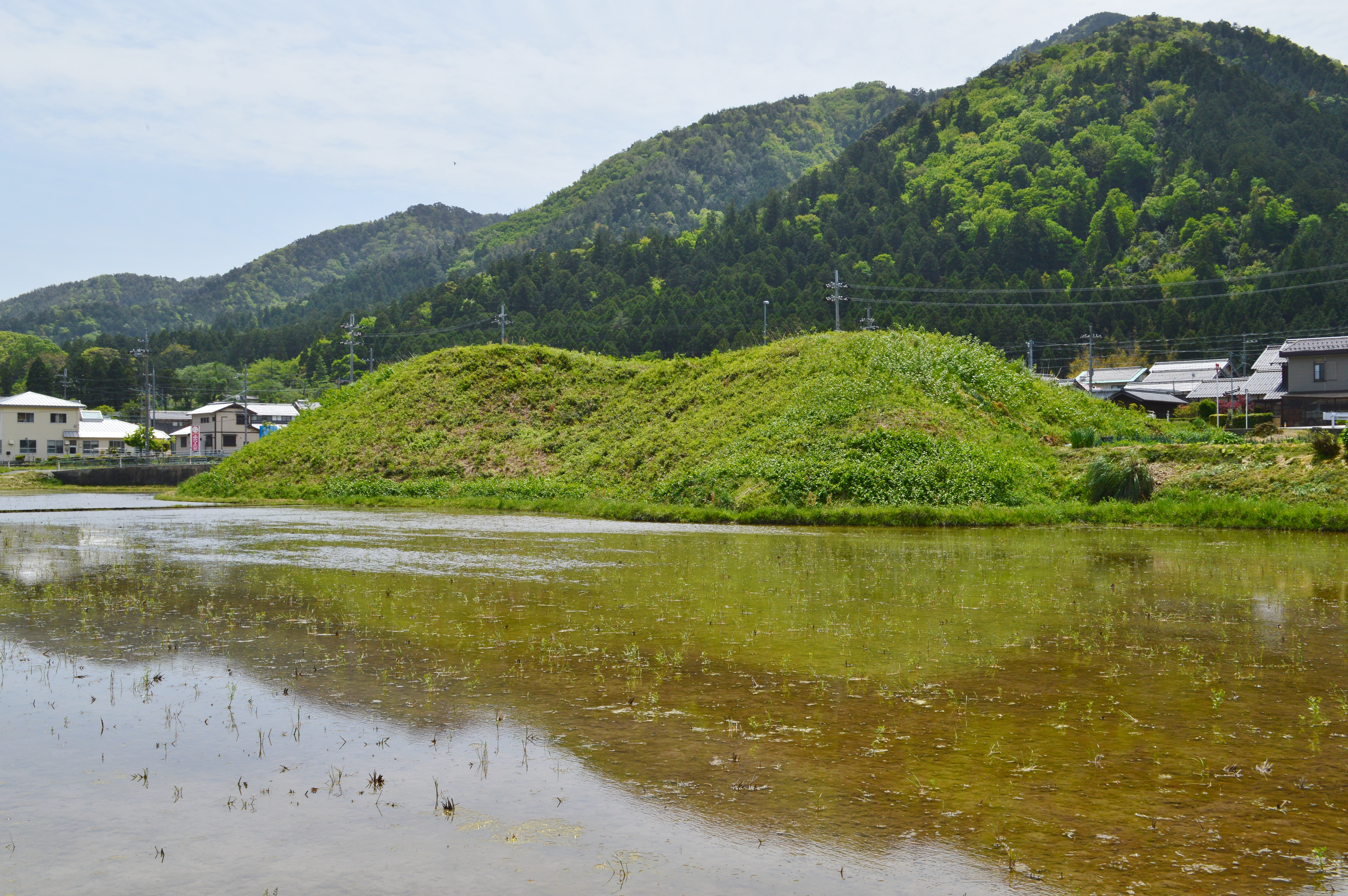
- Jūzen-no-Mori Kofun

- Jūzen-no-Mori Kofun Jūzen-no-Mori Kofun (Japan)
- 35°27′51.84″N 135°50′45.76″E
- Type: Kofun
- Periods: Kofun period
- Location: Tentokujin, Mikata-Kaminaka District, Wakasa, Fukui, Japan
- Region: Hokuriku region

History
- Built: late 5th to early 6th century

Site notes
- Public access: Yes (no facilities)
- Fukui Prefecture Historic Site

Jūzen-no-Mori Kofun (十善の森古墳) is a Kofun period keyhole-shaped burial mound, located in the Tentokuji neighborhood of the town of Wakasa, Fukui in the Hokuriku region of Japan. The tumulus was designated a Fukui Prefecture Historic Site in 1978 and artifacts excavated from the site have been collectively designated as Fukui Prefecture Tangible Cultural Property the same year. It is one of the burial mounds that make up the Kamikochu Kofun cluster (part of the Tentokuji Kofun Group), which are the tombs of the kings of Wakasa in the Kitagawa River Basin.

== Overview ==
The Jūzen-no-Mori Kofun is a zenpō-kōen-fun (前方後円墳), which is shaped like a keyhole, having one square end and one circular end, when viewed from above. It is located on an alluvial fan at the foot of Mount Tentokuji on the left bank of the Kitagawa River in the southwestern part of Fukui Prefecture, in the central part of the Wakasa region. Japan National Route 27 runs along the south side of the burial mound, which has been deformed by destruction such as soil removal. Archaeological excavations were conducted in 1954 and 1994-1995.

The mound is constructed in three tiers, and the front section is orientated to the west. Fukiishi revetment stones and cylindrical haniwa clay figures are found on the outer surface of the mound, and the possibility of a projection has been suggested at the constricted northern part of the mound. A moat (possibly a shield-shaped moat) surrounds the mound, and a land bridge crossing the moat has been confirmed in the southwest. The possibility of haniwa has also been suggested at the outer edge of the moat. The burial facilities consist of horizontal-entry stone burial chambers in both the posterior circular portion and the anterior rectangular sections, and numerous grave goods have been unearthed from both chambers, including Chinese-made bronze mirrors, hundreds of beads, fragment of iron armor and weapons and horse trappings.

The construction period is estimated to be the early 6th century (or late 5th century) during the late Kofun period. As a chieftain's tomb in Wakasa, it follows the Nakatsuka Kofun and precedes the Kamifunazuka Kofun. While the identity of the person buried there is unknown, the Kamikochu Kofun group, which continues from the Wakibukuro Kofun group, is thought to be a group of chieftain's tombs of the Kashiwade clan, the kuni no miyatsuko of Wakasa. The Wakasa Bay coast is known as a region where ornaments and gilded bronze products from Gaya and Baekje are concentrated. Among the artifacts unearthed from this kofun are a Gaya-style gilded bronze bridle, as well as Baekje-style gilded bronze crowns, shoes, and glass beads, making it noteworthy as an example of the interaction between the king of Wakasa at that time and the Korean Peninsula.

The burial chamber in the rear circular section exhibits characteristics of kofun in northern Kyushu style, and is a left-sided single-chamber type in plan, opening to the south. The chamber proper is 4.1 to 4.4 meters long, 2.1 meters wide (at the back wall) and 2.7 meters high. The interior of the burial chamber is coated with red pigment, and the floor is made of river stones. Its dimensions are as follows:.

The burial chamber in the front section is a horizontal-entry chamber that is presumed to have been constructed in a later period. In terms of layout, it is a right-sided single-chambered type chamber, and the walls are similarly coated with red pigment.

The tumulus is approximately 700 meters west of JR West Kaminaka Station, on the south side of the Obama Line. Artifacts from the site are displayed at the Wakasa Town Historical and Cultural Museum.

Total length
67 meters:
Anterior rectangular portion
45 meters wide, 9 meters high. 3-tier
Posterior circular portion
33 meter diameter, 9.6 meters high, 3-tiers

== See also ==
- List of Historic Sites of Japan (Fukui)
