= Genbao Castle =

- 玄蕃尾城
- Tsuruga, Fukui Prefecture, / Nagahama, Shiga Prefecture, Japan
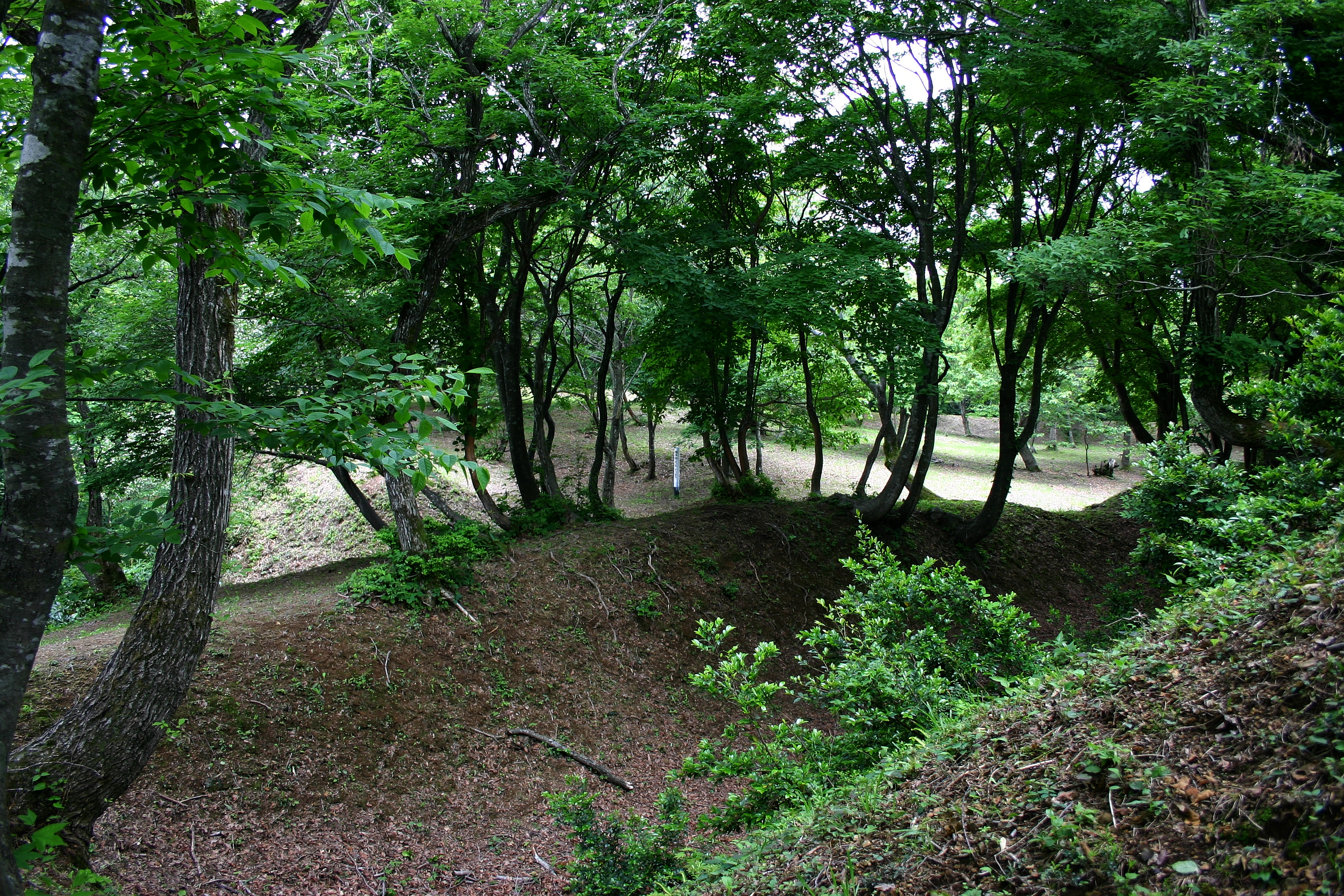
- Genbao Castle ruins

Site information
- Type: yamashiro-style Japanese castle
- Open to the public: yes
- Condition: ruins

Location
- Genbao Castle
- Location within Fukui Prefecture Location within Japan
- Coordinates: 35°35′54.2″N 136°10′35″E

Site history
- Built: Sengoku period
- Built by: Shibata Katsuie (?)
- In use: Sengoku period
- Demolished: 1583

Genbao Castle (玄蕃尾城, Genbao-jō) was a Sengoku period yamashiro-style Japanese castle located in the border area of what is now part of the cities of Tsuruga, Fukui Prefecture and Nagahama in Shiga Prefecture in the Hokuriku region of Honshu, Japan. The ruins have been protected as a National Historic Site since 1999.

== Background ==
Genbao Castle is located on the peak of the 460-meter Mount Uchinakao (also known as Mount Yanagase) at the border of Ōmi Province and Echizen Province. The area controlled the entrance into Hokuriku region from Kansai region, but had many steep mountains with deep valleys. From the Ōmi side, two main roads passed through the mountains, joining at the location of Genbao Castle.

The origins of the castle are uncertain. The location is near where Yanagase Hideyuki, a vassal of the Asakura clan constructed a fortification against invasion by Oda Nobunaga, but it is not certain if this fortification and the location of Genbao Castle are the same. Another theory is that the castle was constructed either before or after the Battle of Shizugatake between Toyotomi Hideyoshi and Shibata Katsuie over the question of Oda Nobunaga's successor, and was intended to protect Echizen from invasion by Hideyoshi's forces. In either case, the castle was abandoned and fell into ruins shortly after Shibata Katsuie's death in 1583.

The castle spread across 150 meters east-to-west by 250 meters north-to-south, with six enclosures on a mountain ridge. The inner bailey at the highest point on the mountain, was a square-shaped area approximately 60 meter long with a tower in its northeastern corner. As the castle was orientated against an attack from the south, two narrow buffer areas protected the inner bailey in this direction to delay any attackers. The bailey was also protected by a two-meter high earthen ramparts, 12-meter wide, six-meter deep dry moats and secondary enclosures. In the north was a large flat area, also about 60 meters square, used as a storage of supplies. As it was intended as only a temporary frontline base, Genbao Castle did not have massive stone walls or a huge tenshu. Nothing remains of the castle today except for overgrown remnants of the moats and earthworks.

The castle was listed as one of the Continued Top 100 Japanese Castles in 2017.

== See also ==
- List of Historic Sites of Japan (Fukui)
- List of Historic Sites of Japan (Shiga)
