= List of cultural properties of Japan – historical materials (Fukui) =

This list is of the cultural properties of Japan designated in the category of historical materials (歴史資料, rekishi shiryō) for the Prefecture of Fukui.

== National Cultural Properties ==
As of 1 December 2014, three Important Cultural Properties have been designated, being of national significance.

Property	Date	Municipality	Ownership	Comments	Image	Coordinates	Ref.
World Map and Map of Japan 世界及日本図 sekai oyobi Nihon zu	Momoyama period	Obama	Wakasa History Museum (福井県立若狭歴史博物館)	pair of eight-panel byōbu, each 118 centimetres (46 in) by 375 centimetres (148 in)		35°29′02″N 135°47′09″E	
World Map and Map of Japan 世界及日本図〈／六曲屏風〉 sekai oyobi Nihon zu (rokkyoku byōbu)	Momoyama period	Fukui	Jōtoku-ji (浄得寺)	pair of six-panel byōbu, each 108 centimetres (43 in) by 216 centimetres (85 in)		36°03′13″N 136°12′40″E	
Map of the Heavens 天之図（星図） ten-no-zu (sei-zu)	Muromachi period	Sakai	Takidan-ji (瀧谷寺)	145.1 centimetres (57.1 in) by 97.4 centimetres (38.3 in)		36°13′19″N 136°08′46″E	

== Prefectural Cultural Properties ==
As of 1 December 2014, four properties have been designated at a prefectural level.

Property	Date	Municipality	Ownership	Comments	Image	Coordinates	Ref.
Kodachi Jinja Prayer Documents 木立神社立願文; Kodachi Jinja ryūganmon	Meiji period	Sakai	Mikuni Jinja (三国神社)			36°12′32″N 136°09′28″E	
Stele 板碑 itabi	1274	Sakai	Shirayama Jinja (白山神社)	170 centimetres (67 in) by 68 centimetres (27 in)		36°09′48″N 136°12′00″E	
Sculptures of Abe Akisue and Akita Sanesue 安倍愛季像・秋田実季像; Abe Akisue zō・Akita Sanesue zō	1652	Obama	Haga-ji (羽賀寺)			35°31′08″N 135°45′52″E	
Hōkyōintō 宝篋印塔 hōkyōintō	1358	Obama		moved to its present location in 1873; in height c. 3.5 metres (11 ft 6 in)		35°29′23″N 135°45′41″E	

== See also ==
- Cultural Properties of Japan
- List of National Treasures of Japan (historical materials)
- List of Historic Sites of Japan (Fukui)
- Wakasa Province
- Echizen Province
- List of Cultural Properties of Japan - paintings (Fukui)
- Fukui Prefectural Museum of Cultural History
