= Kabutoyama Kofun =

Burial mound in Sabae, Fukui Prefecture, Japan

- 兜山古墳 (Japanese)
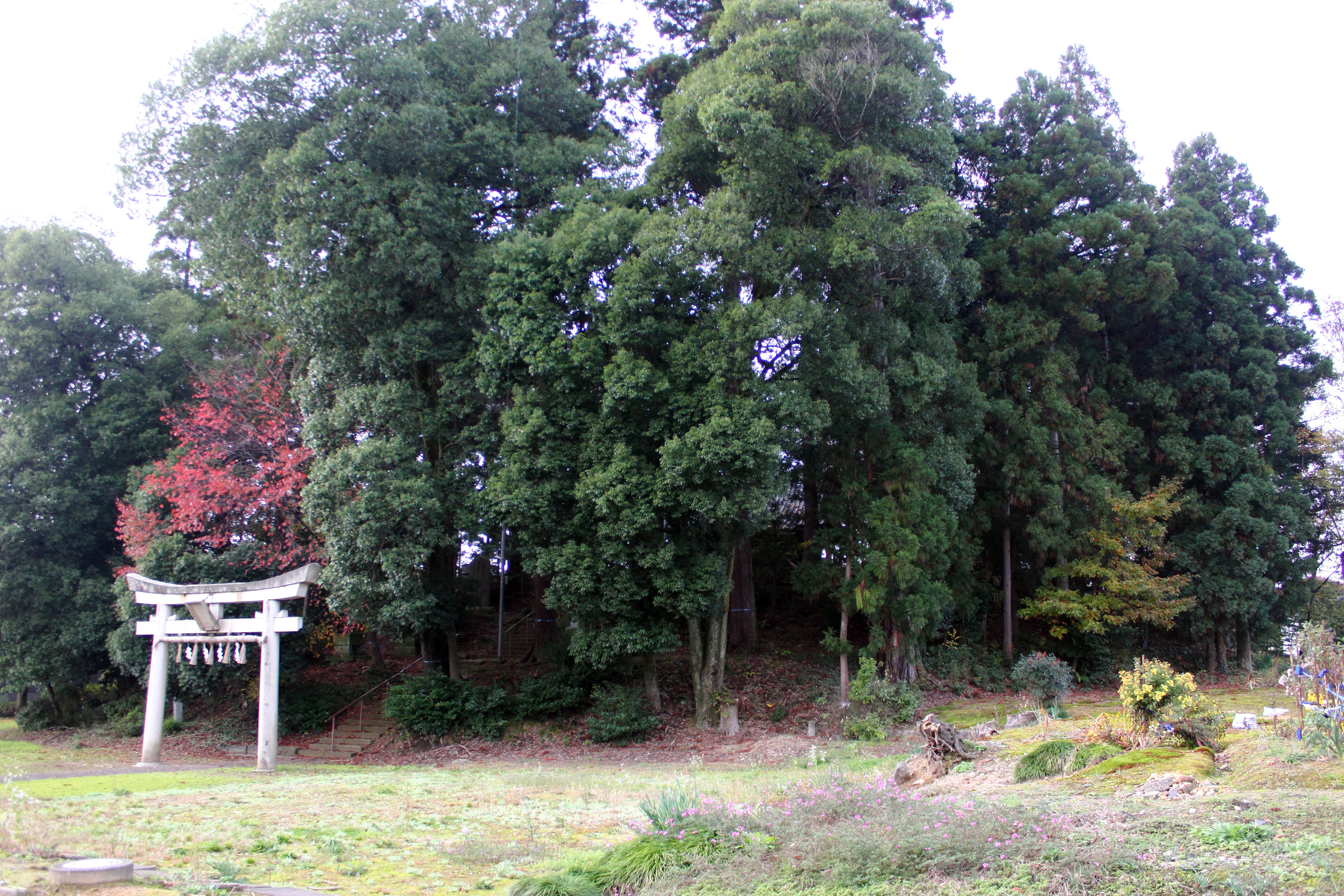
- Kabutoyama Kofun

- Kabutoyama Kofun Kabutoyama Kofun (Japan)
- 35°58′28.0″N 136°11′00.1″E
- Type: kofun
- Periods: Kofun period
- Location: Sabae, Fukui, Japan
- Region: Hokuriku region

History
- Built: 5th century AD

Site notes
- Public access: Yes (no facilities)

The Kabutoyama Kofun (兜山古墳) is kofun burial mound located in the Shimmeicho neighborhood of the city of Sabae, Fukui, in the Hokuriku region of Japan. It was designated a National Historic Site of Japan in 1977.

== Overview ==
The Kabutoyama Kofun is a circular-type tumulus (empun (円墳)) located on a hillside north of the centre of the city of Sabae. It is orientated east, and is crowned with a small Hachiman shrine. The tumulus is constructed in two layers, with an overall diameter of 70 meters at its base, 49 meters at its upper tier, and eight meters in height. The periphery of the mound was surrounded by a circumferential moat 15 meters in width, of which a small portion survives in the northeastern sector. It is the largest circular-type kofun found in Fukui Prefecture. No fukiishi or cylindrical haniwa have found in the area, and the details of the burial chamber are unknown, as the interior of the tumulus has not been excavated; however, from the morphology of the mound it is estimated to date from the 5th century AD. An excavation survey of the hem of the mound was carried out in 1984 and 1991 and 2001, and it became clear that a circumference moat with a width of about 17 meters encircles the mound, and the area enclosed over 90 meters in diameter

The tumulus does not appear in any historical records and the name of rank of the person buried within is unknown. It is the largest of many similar kofun which have been discovered in the area, which has been densely populated since the Yayoi and Kofun periods, and from its scale it must have been the tomb of a local chieftain or other person of importance. It is located about a five-minute walk from Shinmei Station on the Fukui Railway.

== Gallery ==
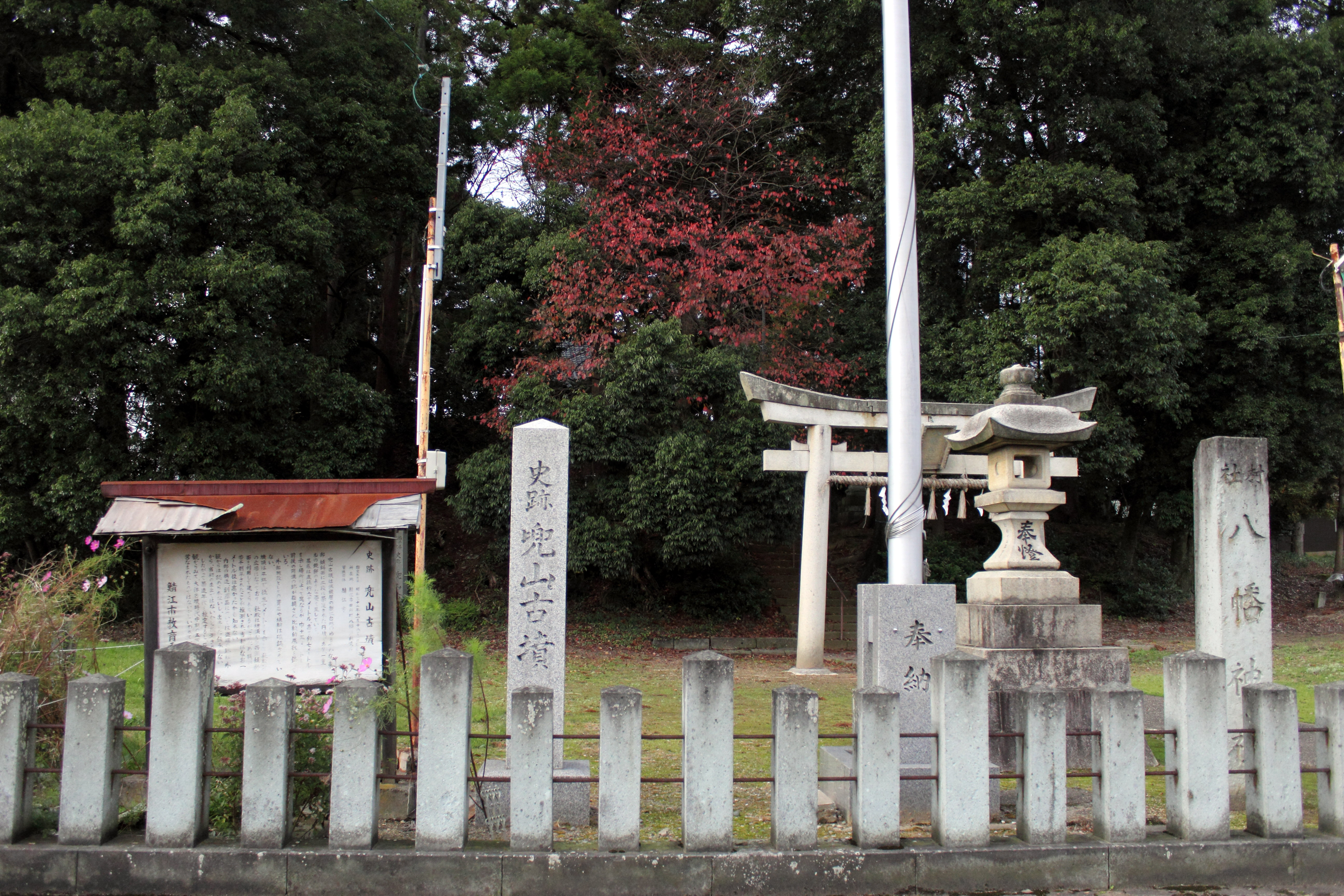
Hachiman Jinja

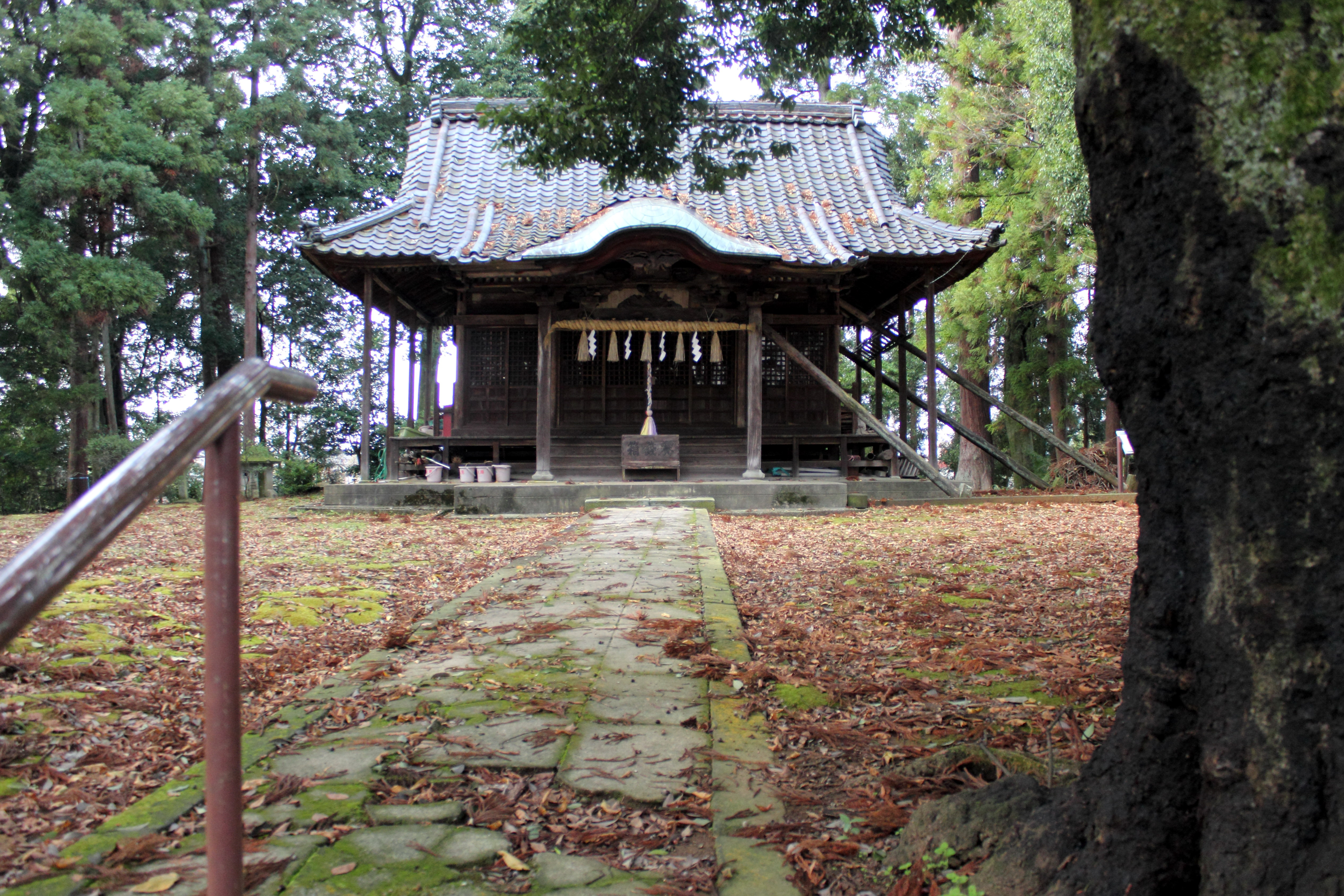
Hachiman Jinja Shaden

== See also ==
- List of Historic Sites of Japan (Fukui)
