= Okozu Salt Works =

Salt production site in Obama, Japan

- 岡津製塩遺跡 (Japanese)
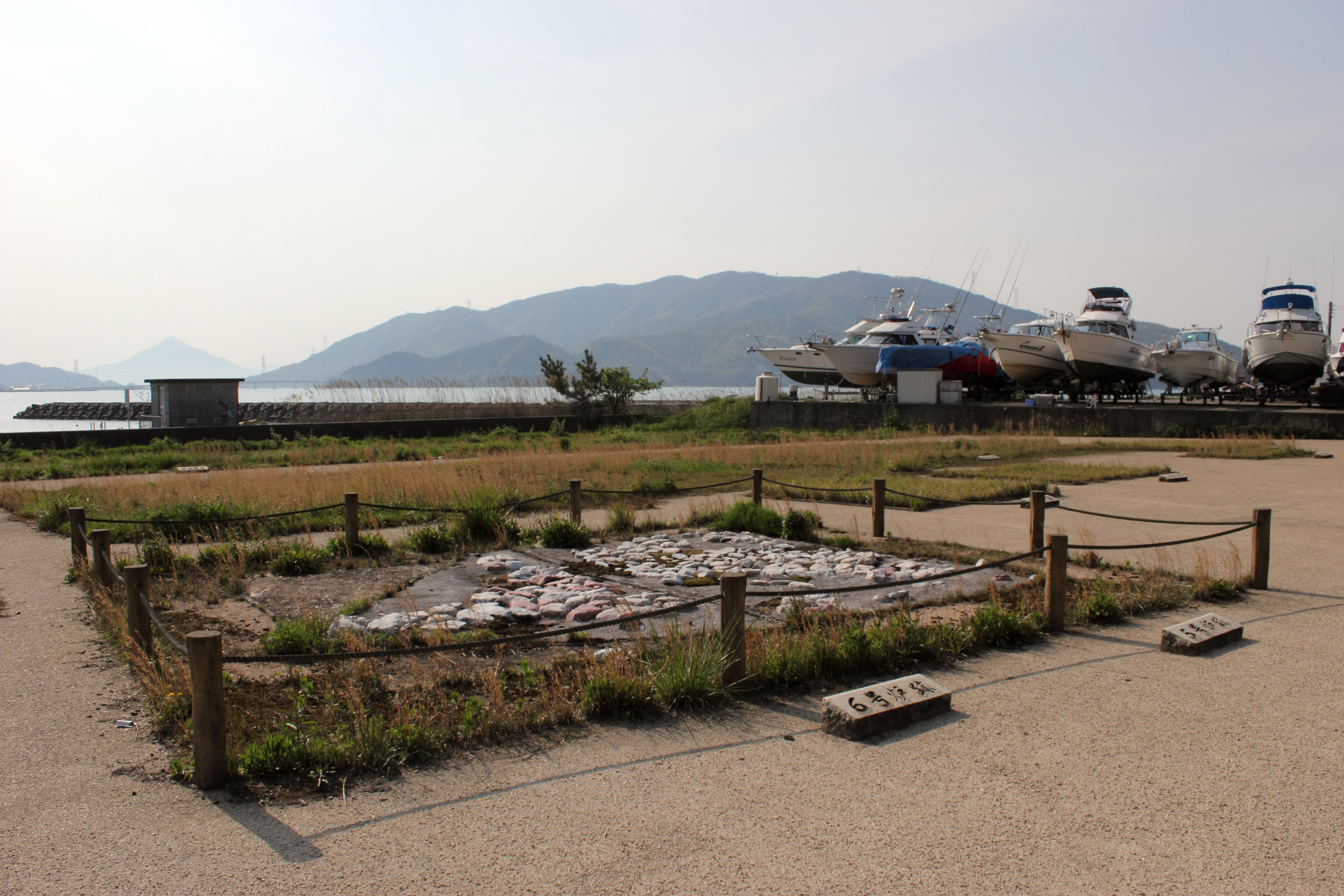
- Okozu Salt Works

- Okozu Salt Works Okozu Salt Works (Japan)
- 35°28′54″N 135°39′20″E
- Periods: Kofun period to Nara period
- Location: Obama, Fukui, Japan
- Region: Hokuriku region

History
- Built: 3rd to 4th century AD

Site notes
- Area: 4,981 m^{2} (53,620 sq ft)
- Public access: Yes

The Okozu Salt Works (岡津製塩遺跡, Okozu seien iseki) is the location of a salt production site located in the Okuzu neighborhood of the city of Obama, Fukui in the Hokuriku region of Japan. The site was designated a National Historic Site of Japan in 1979.

== Overview ==
The Okozu Salt Works is located in the inner area of Obama Bay, approximately seven kilometers the west along Japan National Route 27 from the modern city centre of Obama. The area is part of scenic Wakasa Wan Quasi-National Park and the site faces Mount Aoba, which was mentioned in the Man'yōshū poetic anthology. Ancient Wakasa Province was noted for sending seafood and salt as tax in kind to the Yamato court, and wooden invoice tags for salt with the name "Wakasa" found at Fujiwara-kyō and Heijō-kyō indicate that salt from Wakasa was being sent to the Yamato area from the Asuka period. In the Wakasa region, 50 earthenware salt-making sites have been confirmed, of which this is one of the best preserved.

Per an archaeological excavation conducted by the Obama City Board of Education in 1973, the remains of nine cobblestone-lined salt-making furnaces were discovered. The earliest was estimated to date to at least the Kofun period. Five of the furnaces contained salt-production pottery vessel fragments dated to the 8th century, and had a length of four to five meters and a width of two to four meters. Remnants of charcoal were found within the spaces between the cobblestones. The remaining four furnaces appear to be of an earlier type, from the end of the 7th century to the early 8th century. To the west of the furnace group is a large hardened surface measuring 30 meters by 10 meters, of unknown purpose. Furthermore, a coastal revetment was detected about 20 meters behind the current coastline. The surface is the result of layers of red soil with a thickness of three to ten centimetres having been fired repeatedly over many centuries. To the west of this surface is the old coastline, with many fragments of burned gravel, which appears to be waste from the furnaces.

The site is now a historical park. It is located about a 10-minute walk from Kato Station on the JR West Obama Line.

== See also ==
- List of Historic Sites of Japan (Fukui)
