= Kunugi Kofun =

Kofun period burial mound in Awara, Fukui, Japan

- 椚古墳 (Japanese)
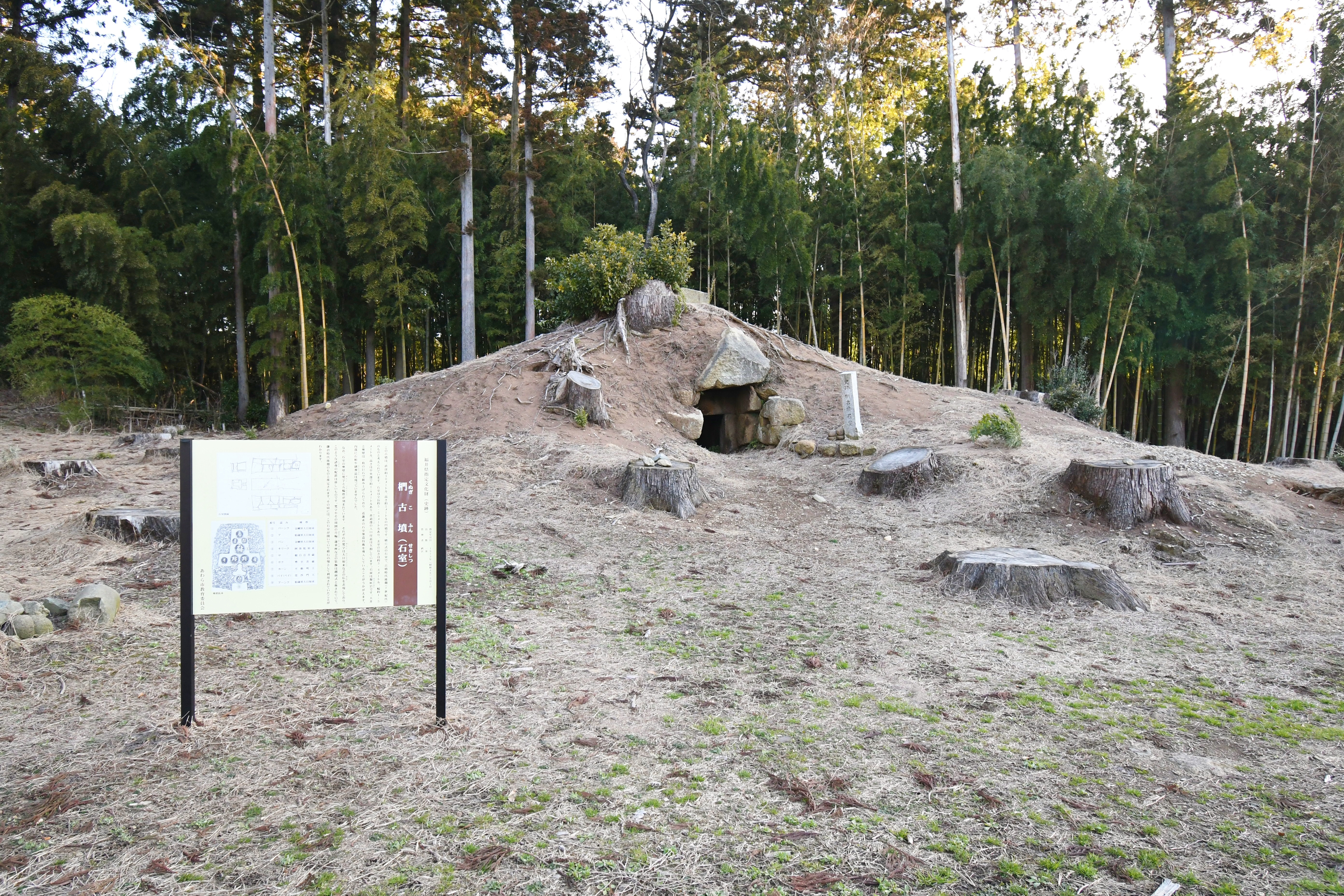
- Kunugi Kofun

- Kunugi Kofun Kunugi Kofun (Japan)
- 36°12′10.73″N 136°17′5.65″E
- Type: Kofun
- Periods: Kofun period
- Location: Kunugi, Awara, Fukui, Japan
- Region: Hokuriku region

History
- Built: late 6th to early 7th century

Site notes
- Public access: Yes (no facilities)
- Fukui Prefecture Historic Site

Kunugi Kofun (椚古墳) is a Kofun period burial mound, located in the Kunugi neighborhood of the city of Awara, Fukui in the Hokuriku region of Japan. The tumulus was designated a Fukui Prefecture Historic Site in 1973. It is located within the grounds of a Hachiman shrine.

== Overview ==
The Kunugi Kofun is a enpun (円墳)-style round tumulus, with a diameter of approximately 18 meters and height of three meters located on the foothills near the confluence of the Kiyotakigawa and the Gonsegawa rivers in northern Fukui Prefecture.

The burial chamber is a double-chambered horizontal-entry stone chamber opening to the southwest, neatly constructed using cut tuff stones. The back wall is made of a single monolith. It is approximately 5.54 meters long, with a main chamber measuring 3.4 by 1.5 meters, with a height of 1.8 meters, although the front of the entry passage has been destroyed and it may have originally been longer. The burial chamber has been open for centuries, and no archaeological excavations have been conducted, so no grave goods have been found. From the construction technique, it is estimated to be the late Kofun period, around the late 6th to early 7th century.

The burial chamber was used during the late Kamakura period as a training place for esoteric Buddhism, and the back wall is inscribed with Siddhaṃ script characters representing various Buddhas, including Dainichi Nyorai, and a five-ringed stupa with surrounding decorations such as moon discs and lotus pedestals in what is known as the "Echizen style." The site was robbed in 1912, when stones were taken from the burial chamber for use in constructing a bridge over the Gonsegawa River.

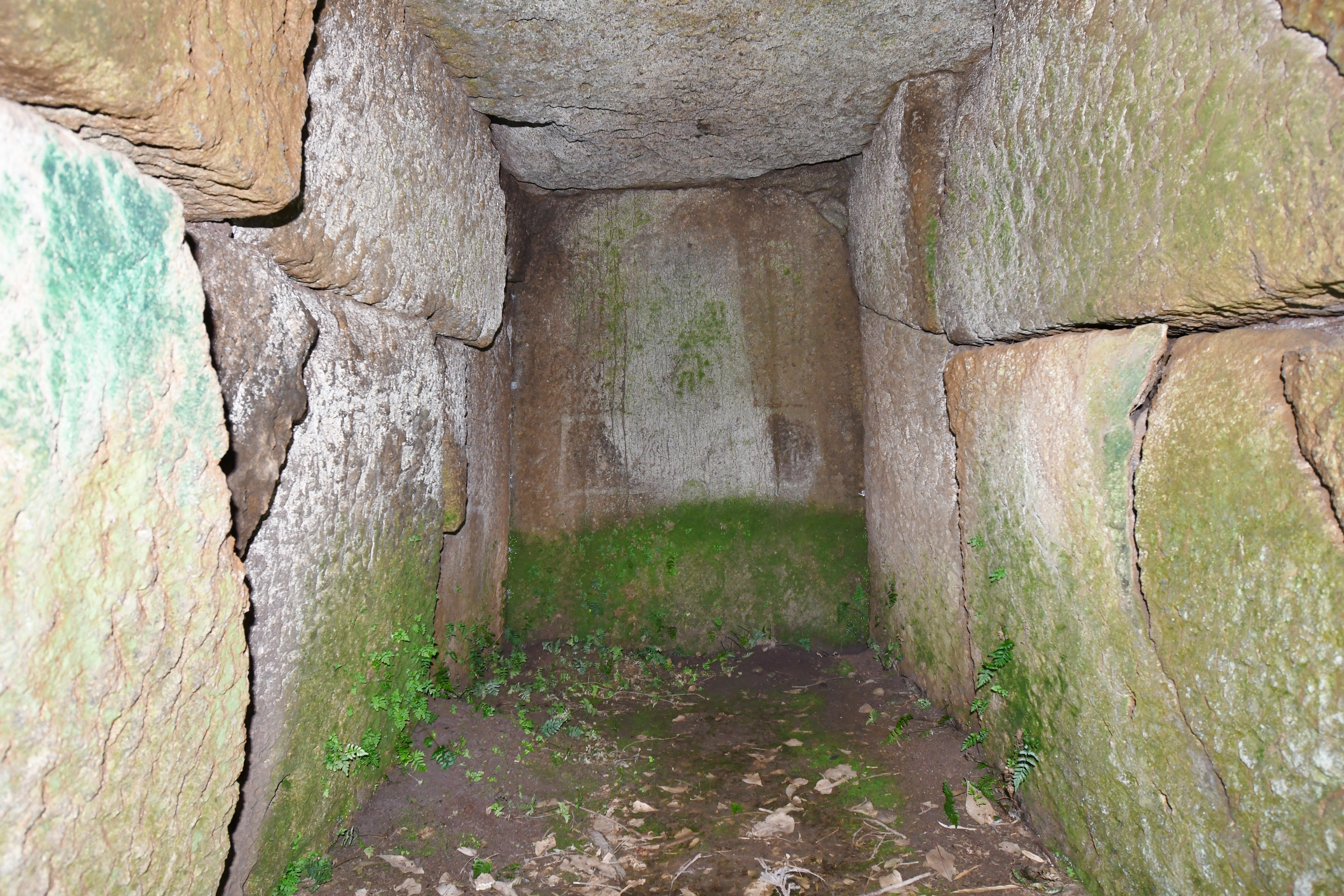
Burial chamber

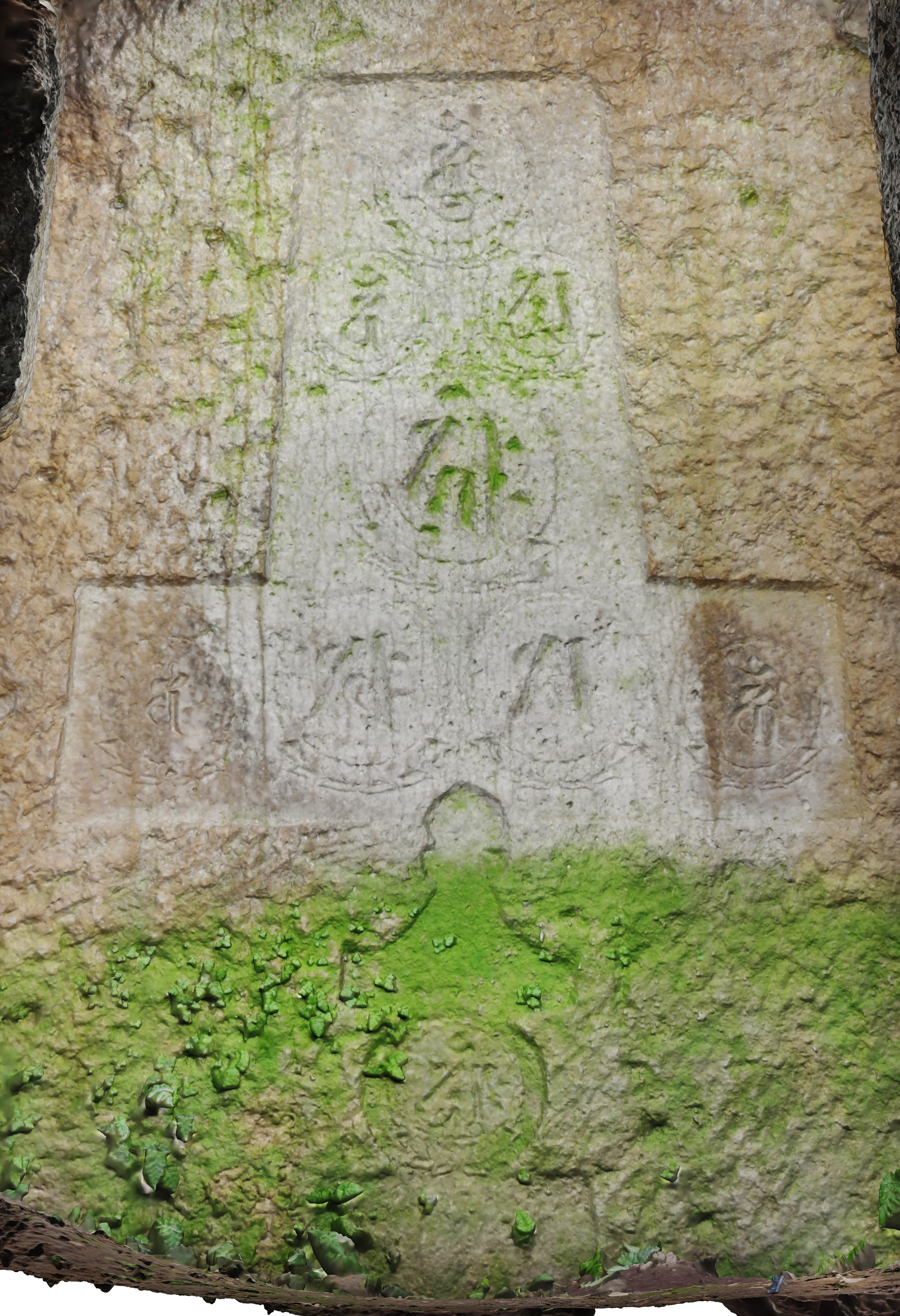
Back wall of burial chamber

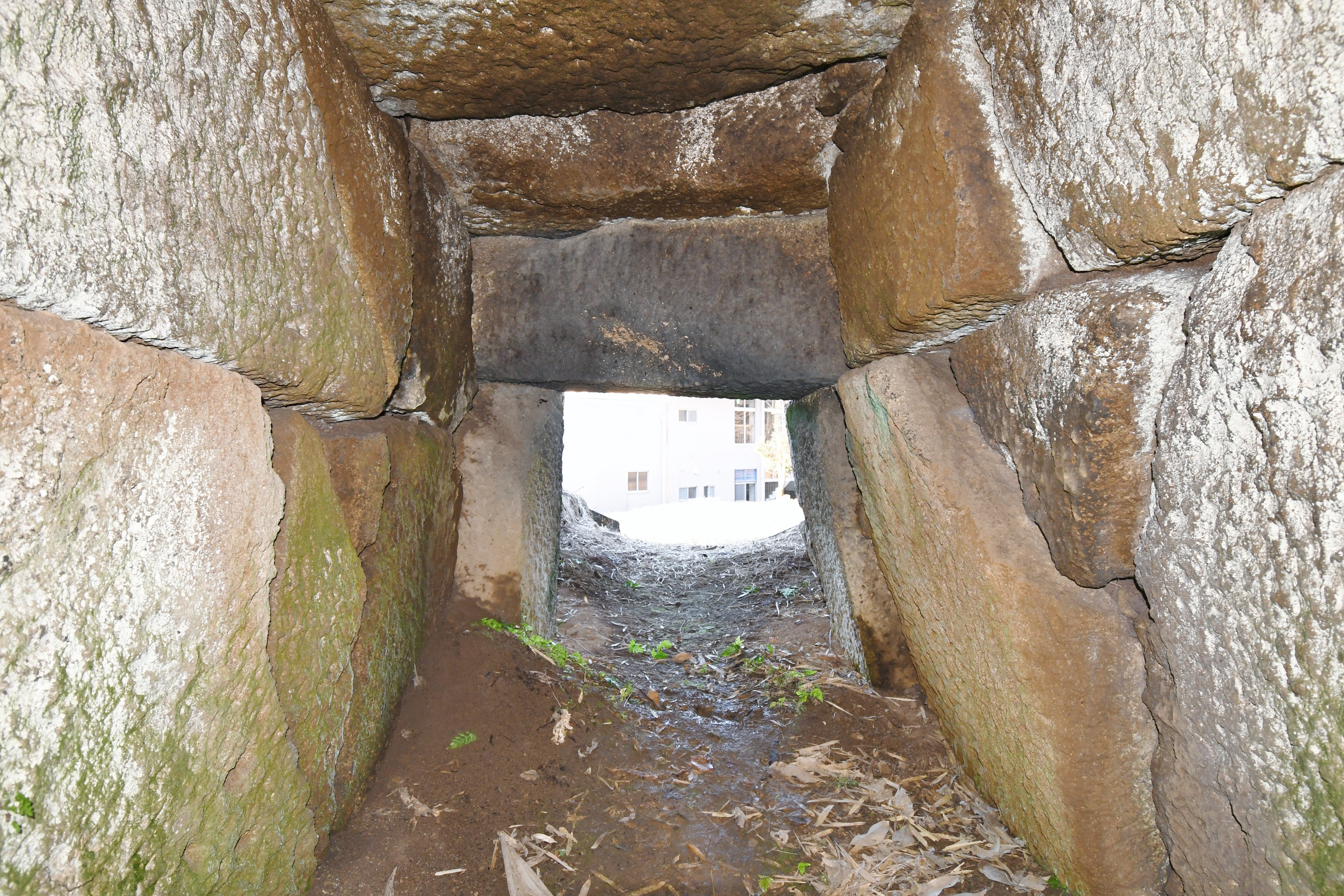
Burial chamber (towards the entry)

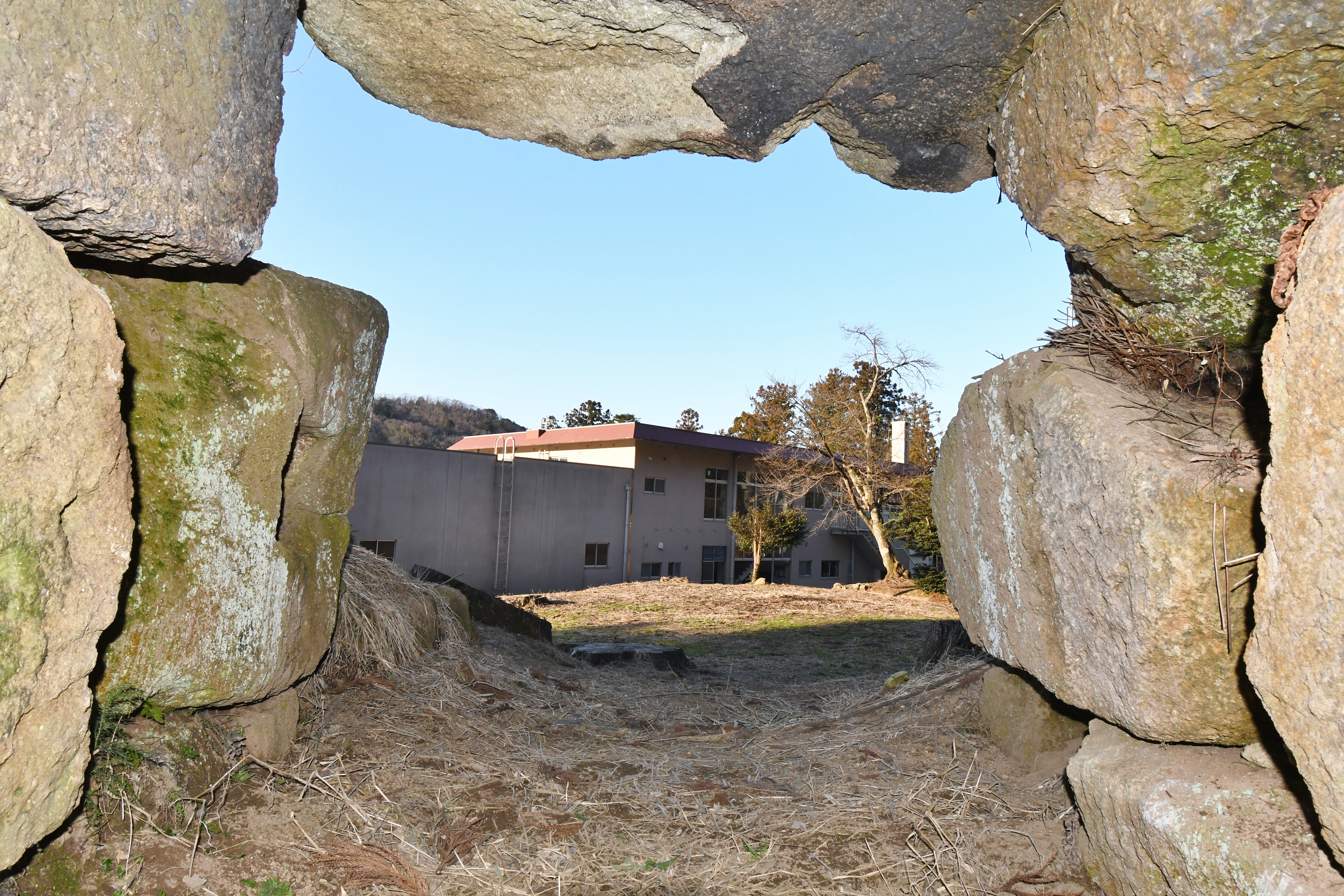
Entrance passage (towards the entry)

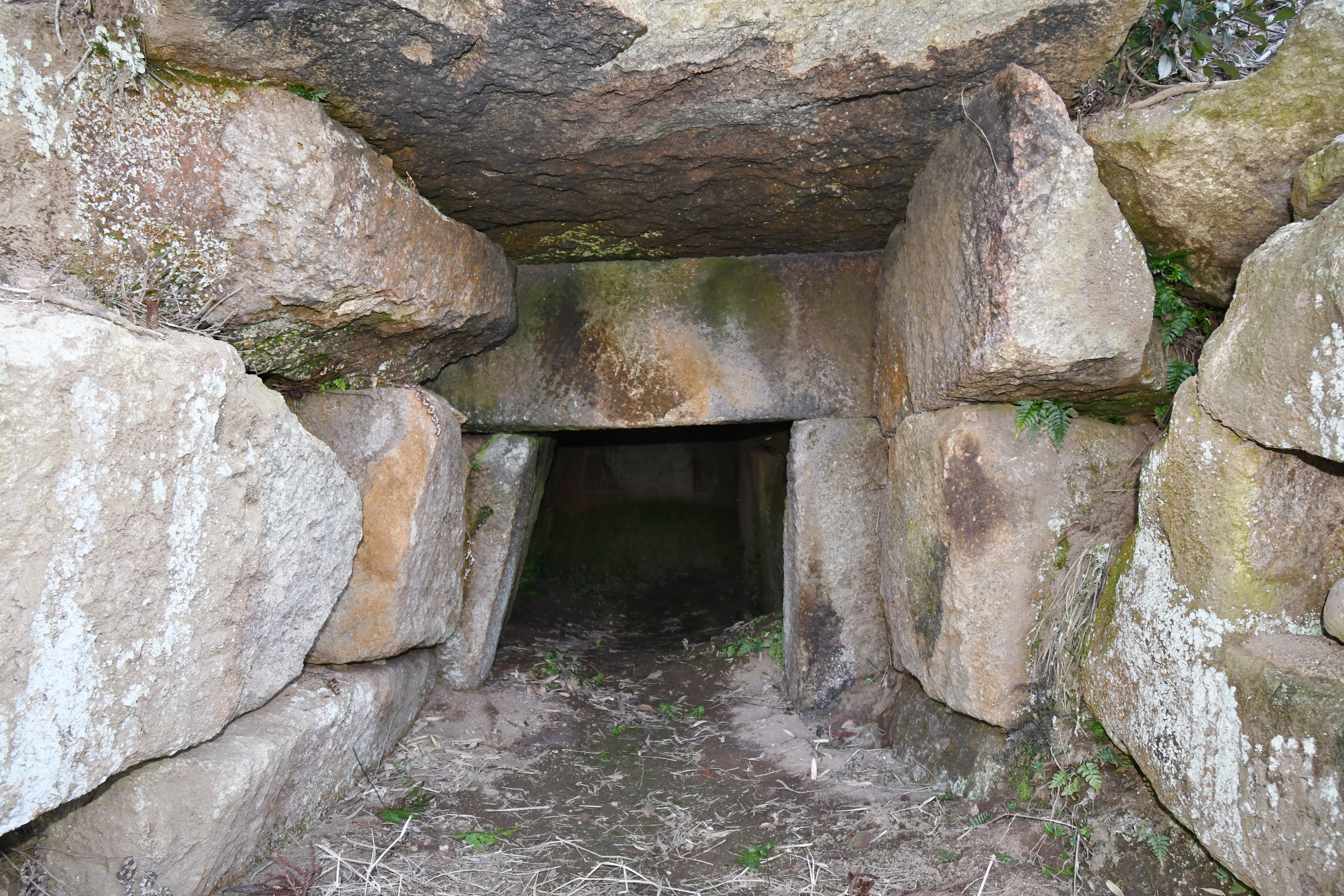
Entrance passage (towards the burial chamber)

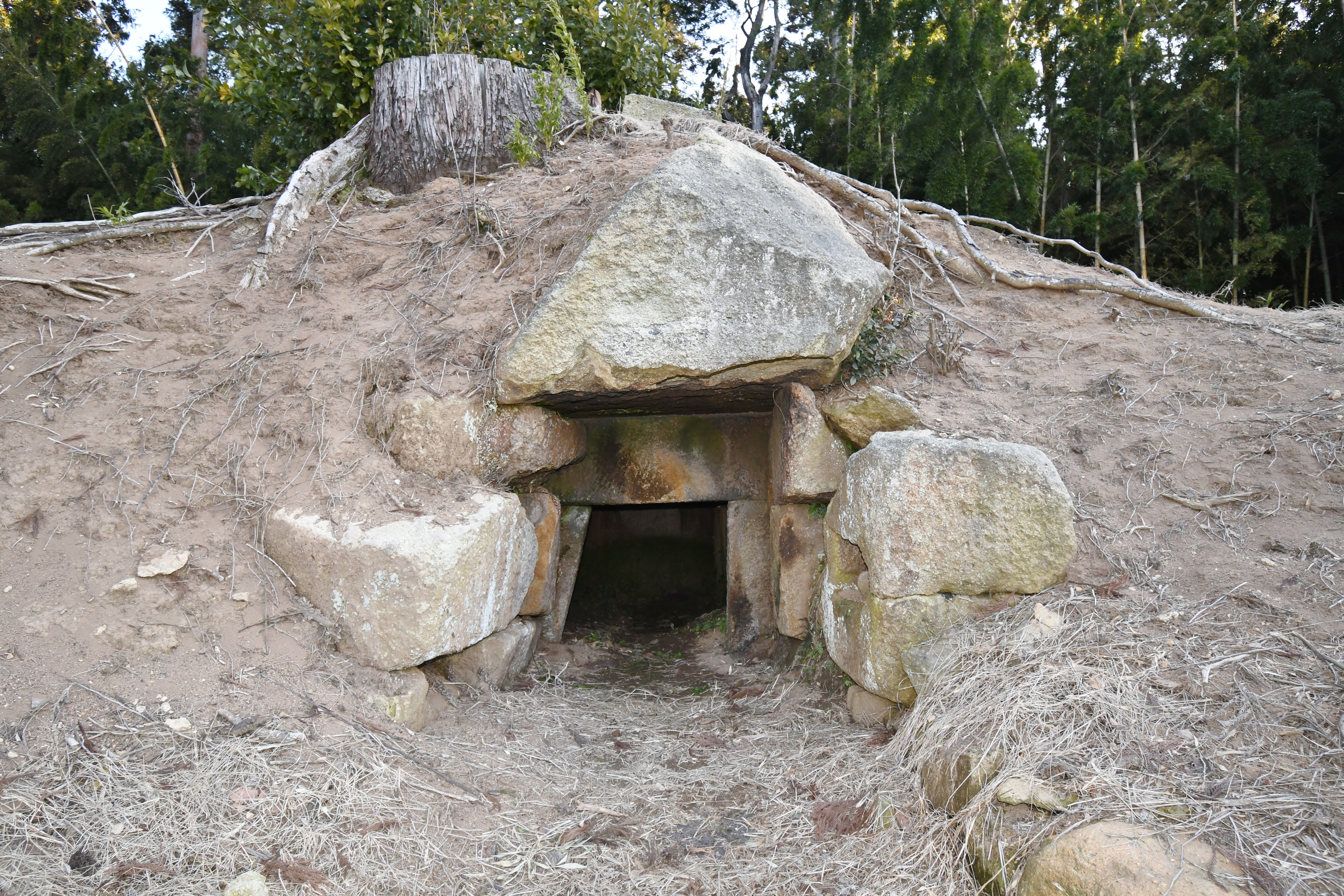
Opening

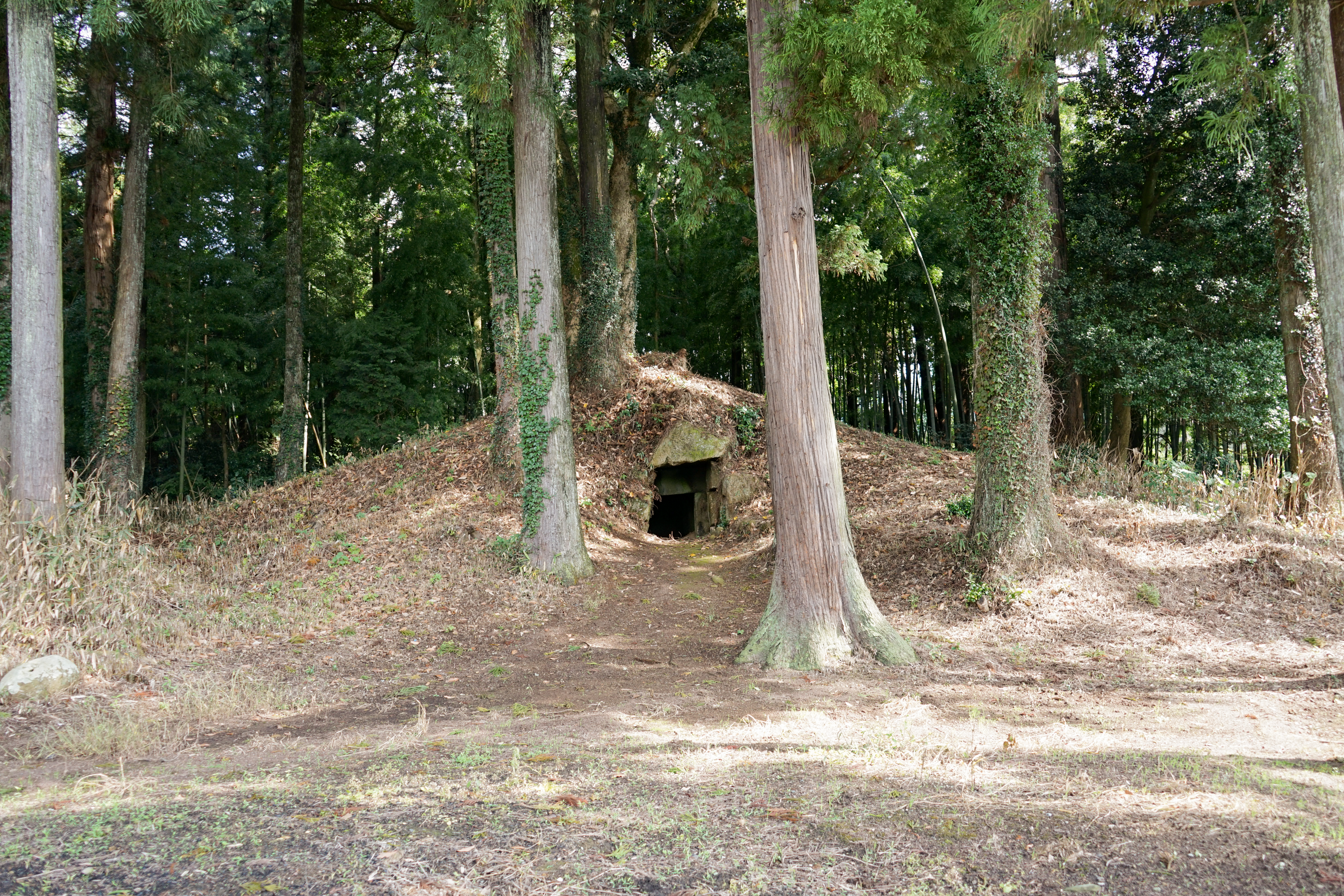
Burial mound and stone chamber entry (2017)

== See also ==
- List of Historic Sites of Japan (Fukui)
