= Nakagō Kofun Cluster =

Group of kofun burial mounds in Japan

- 中郷古墳群 (Japanese)
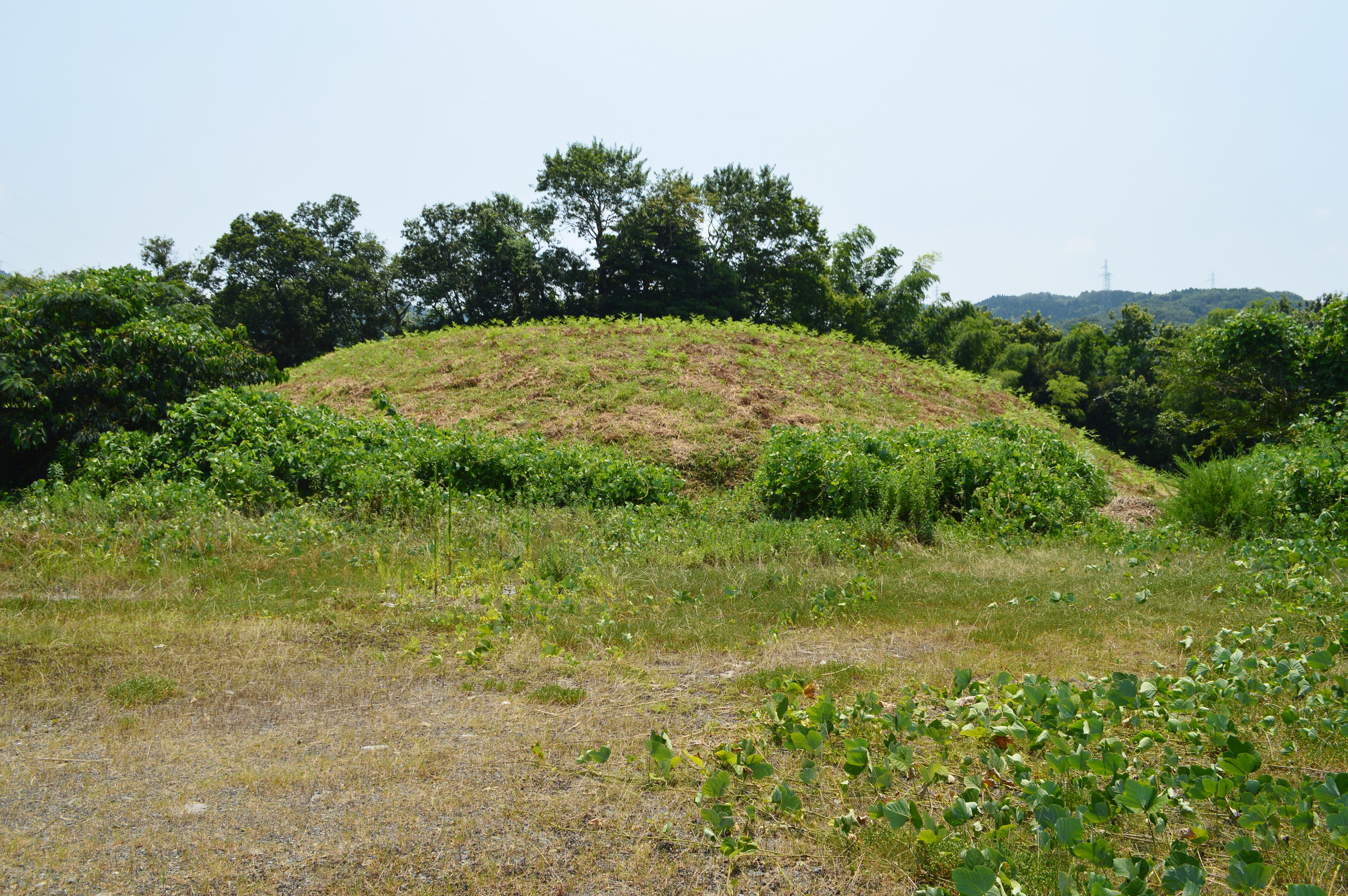
- Mukaideyama Kofun 1

- Nakagō Kofun Cluster Nakagō Kofun Cluster (Japan)
- 35°38′08″N 136°05′09″E
- Type: kofun cluster
- Periods: Kofun period
- Location: Tsuruga, Fukui, Japan
- Region: Hokuriku region

History
- Built: 4th-5th century AD

Site notes
- Public access: Yes (no public facilities)

The Nakagō Kofun Cluster (中郷古墳群, Nakagō Kofun-gun) is a group of kofun burial mounds located in the Sakashita neighborhood of the city of Tsuruga, Fukui in the Hokuriku region of Japan. The site was designated a National Historic Site of Japan in 1988.

== Overview ==
Nakagō Kofun Cluster is located on a hillside east of the centre of the city of Tsuruga facing the Sea of Japan, and consists of two separate groups: the Mukaiyama Kofun Cluster (向出山古墳群, Mukaiyama Kofun-gun) and the Myōjinyama Kofun Cluster (明神山古墳群, Myōjinyama Kofun-gun). These tumuli date from the 4th to 6th century AD and were discovered during the construction of a highway bypass connecting the Hokuriku Expressway with Japan National Route 8, during which time a number of other archaeological discoveries were made, including the Yoshikawa Site, a Yayoi period settlement, and the Kotanigahora Kofun Cluster; however, neither of these sites received government protection and were totally destroyed during highway construction after a hasty compliance excavation. The Nakagō Kofun Cluster itself did not receive full protection, and within the site only Mukaiyama Tombs 1, 3 and 4 and Myōjinyama Tombs 1, 2, 3, 9 and 10 are covered by the National Historic Site designation.

Mukaiyama Tomb 1 was excavated several times starting in 1954, and the two vertical-type burial chambers were opened. Grave goods found include weapons such as swords, spearheads, and fragments of gold-plated armor and helmets, bronze mirrors, and agricultural implements. The weapons in particular are considered to be rare examples nationwide, and have been preserved since 2010 at a private folk museum in Tsuruga.

The tumuli are about 15 minutes by car from Tsuruga Station on the JR West Hokuriku Main Line.

== Mukaiyama site ==
This site consists of three surviving circular-type kofun (empun (円墳)) on a hilltop ridge in the Yoshikawa neighborhood of Tsuruga. There is an explanatory plaque in front of each tumulus.

- Mukaiyama No.1: A large burial mound from the end of the fifth century, diameter 60 meters, height nine meters in two stages, faced with fukiishi stones. There is also a possibility that it was originally a scallop-shaped tumulus with a total length of 75 meters. There are two pit-type stone chambers at the top of the mound, and a large number of burial items have been excavated. However, the south side is partly missing due to construction work.
- Mukaiyama No.2: This was a circular tumulus from the 5th century, possibility older than Mukaiyama No. 1. It was demolished during the construction work of 1983.
- Mukaiyama No.3: This is a circular tumulus from the second half of the sixth century, with a diameter of 15 meters, a height of four meters, with a corridor-type stone chamber (total length 7.2 meters, length of the entry room 3.7 meters, width of 2.0 meters, height 2.7 meters).
- Mukaiyama No.4: This is a circular tumulus from the second half of the sixth century, diameter eight meters, height two meters, partially collapsed due to overgrowth of trees and plants.

== Myōjinyama site ==
This site consisted of 23 kofun, of which five survive, on a hilltop ridge in the Sakanoshita neighborhood of Tsuruga. The site does not have any pathways or placards.

- Myōjinyama No.1: Keyhole-shaped tumulus (zenpō-kōen-fun (前方後円墳)) from the 4th century, length 47 meters, height 5.5 meters, faced with fukiishi stones.
- Myōjinyama No.2: Circular tumulus from the 4th century
- Myōjinyama No.3: Keyhole-shaped tumulus from the 4th century, length 53.5 meters, height seven meters
- Myōjinyama No 9: A keyhole-shaped tumulus from the first half of the sixth century, a length of 20 meters, a height of three meters, with a lateral hole type stone chamber
- Myōjinyama No.10: A circular tumulus

== See also ==
- List of Historic Sites of Japan (Fukui)
