= Wakasa Kokubun-ji =

Buddhist temple in Obama, Fukui prefecture, Japan

Coordinates: 35°28′48.86″N 135°47′19.10″E

Wakasa Kokubun-ji 若狭国分寺
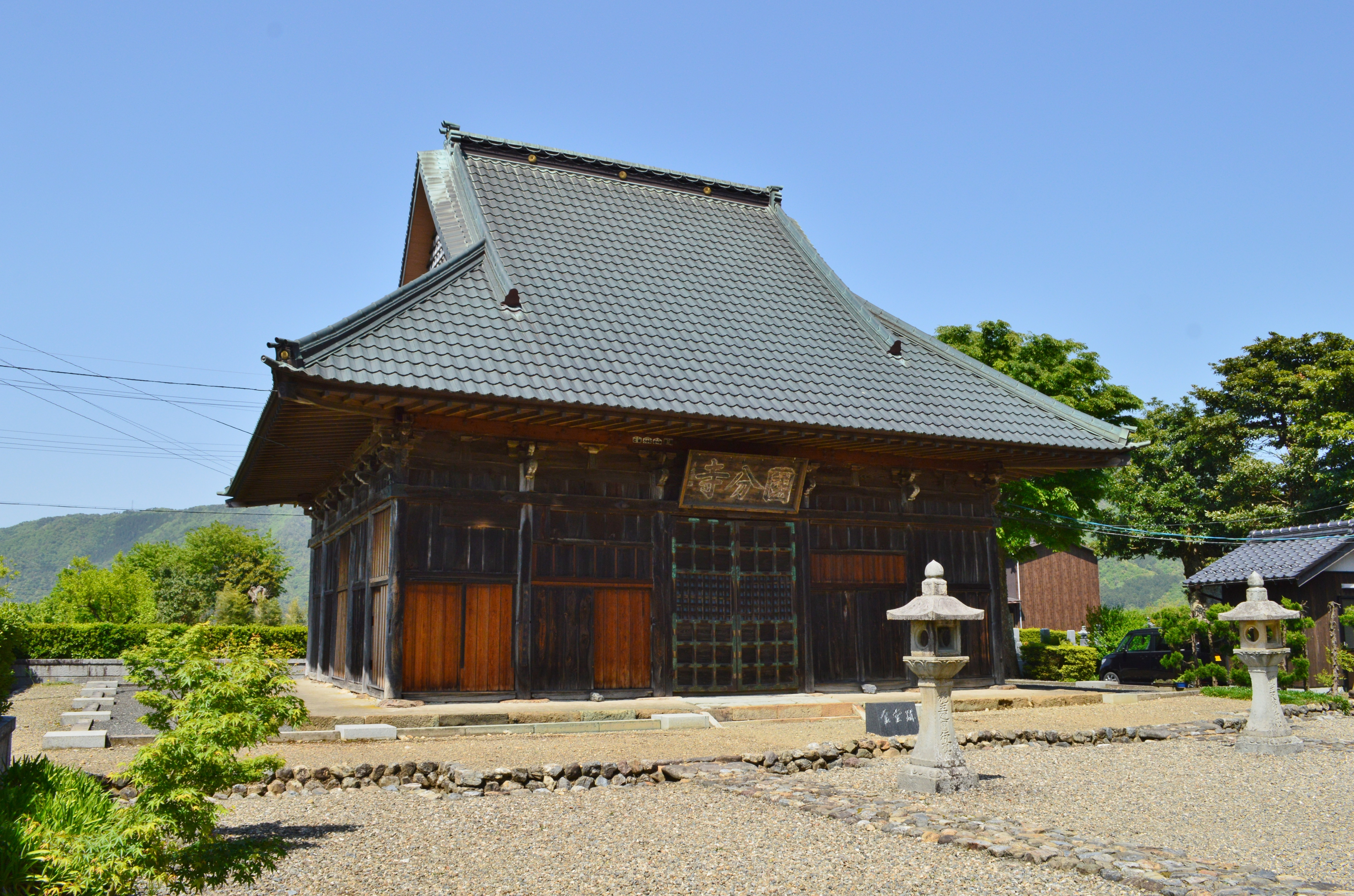
- Wakasa Kokubun-ji Shaka-do

- Wakasa Kokubun-ji Wakasa Kokubun-ji (Japan)

Religion
- Affiliation: Buddhist
- Deity: Shaka Nyōrai
- Rite: Sōtō Zen

Location
- Location: 51-1 Kokubun, Obama-shi, Fukui-ken
- Country: Japan

Architecture
- Founder: Emperor Shōmu
- Completed: c.741
- National Important Cultural Property National Historic Site of Japan

Wakasa Kokubun-ji (若狭国分寺) is a Buddhist temple located in the city of Obama, Fukui, Japan. It belongs to the Sōtō school of Japanese Zen and its honzon is a statue of Shaka Nyōrai. It is one of the few surviving provincial temples established by Emperor Shōmu during the Nara period (710 – 794). Due to this connection, the temple grounds were designated as a National Historic Site in 1976. It is located about 20 minutes on foot from Higashi-Obama Station on the JR West Obama Line.

== Background ==
The Shoku Nihongi records that in 741, as the country recovered from a major smallpox epidemic, Emperor Shōmu ordered that a monastery and nunnery be established in every province, for the purpose of promoting Buddhism as the national religion of Japan and standardising control of imperial rule over the provinces.

== History ==
The Wakasa Kokubun-ji is located on the alluvial plain of the Kitagawa River, approximately 4.5 kilometers east of the modern city centre of Obama. An archaeological excavation was conducted since 1972, indicating that the present temple overlaps the Nara period temple, which was built on a scale slightly smaller than other provincial temples, with compound 230 meters square. The exact date of construction is unknown, but is believed to be around 741 AD based on records indicating that the structures of Taikō-ji, pre-existing family temple of a local clan, was relocated to this site to create the Wakasa Kokubun-ji. The original temple was rebuilt in the Heian period with a slightly different building plan, and in a record dating 1603, the date of construction is given as 807 AD. No roof tiles have been found at the site, which is unusual for a provincial temple, although Nara period roof tiles have been found at the Taikō-ji and the nearby Wakasa Jingū-ji, indicating that tiles were available. The temple is mentioned in Heian period and Kamakura period records, although mention of its associated provincial nunnery disappear after 1265 AD, and the exact site of the nunnery is now unknown. The temple fell into decline in the Muromachi period,

In 1611, a Shako-dō was constructed on the site of the original Kondō. This building was rebuilt in 1705.

== Precincts ==
The current precincts consist of the Shako-dō, a 5 x 5 bay building in the irimoya-style containing the temple's honzon Shaka Nyorai. Both the building and the statue are Obama City Designated Tangible Cultural Properties. To the west of the Shako-dō is the Yakushi-dō, containing a Yakushi Nyorai flanked by Shaka Nyorai and Amida Nyorai. The Edo period Yakushi Nyorai is from the now-vanished provincial nunnery, and is an Important Cultural Property. The other two statues are both Obama City Designated Tangible Cultural Properties.

Also within the grounds is a large enpun (円墳)-style circular kofun tumulus, with a diameter of approximately 50 meters. One of the largest in the Wakasa region, it dates from the 6th century.

== Gallery ==
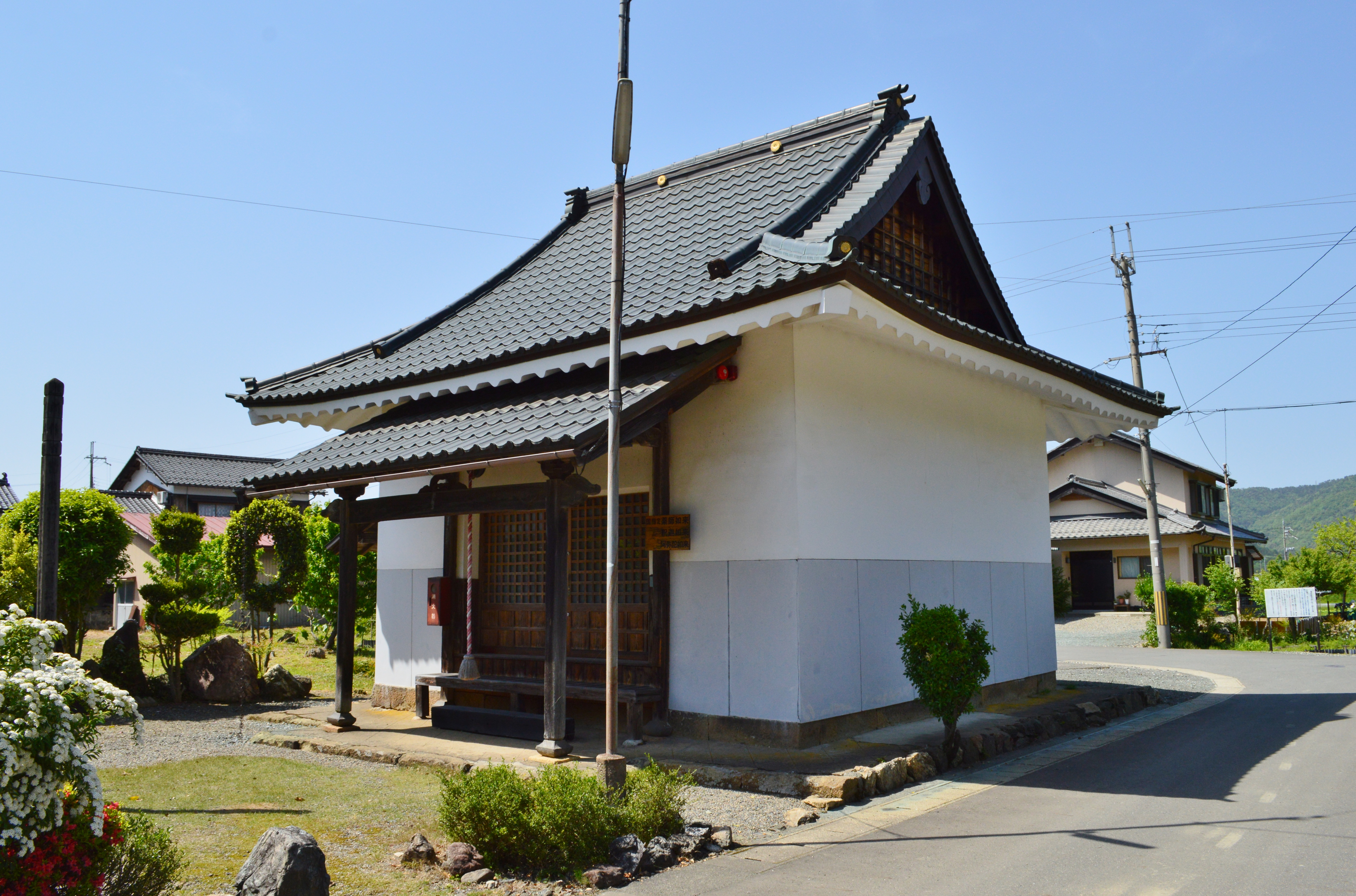
Yakushi-do

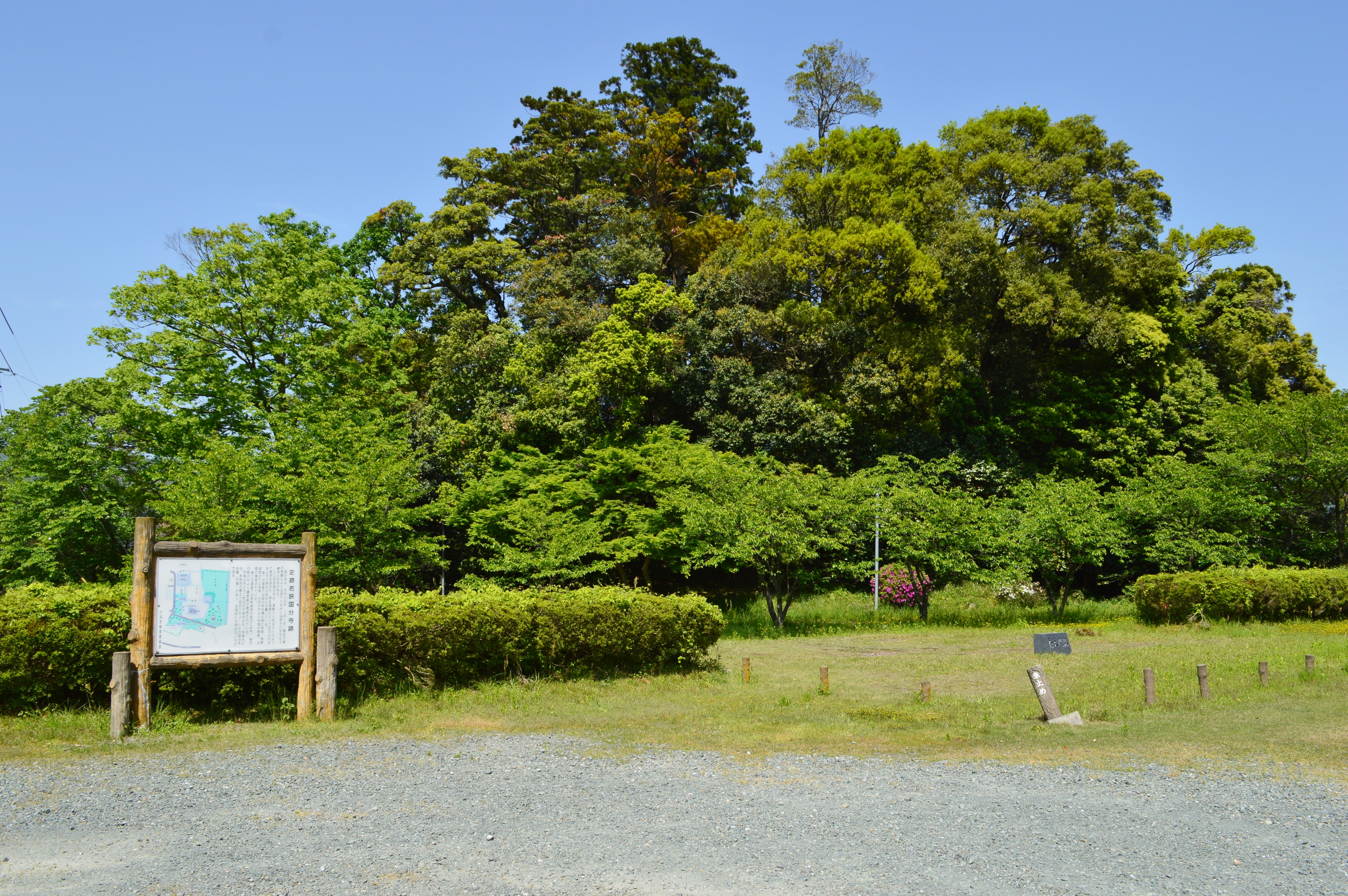
Kofun

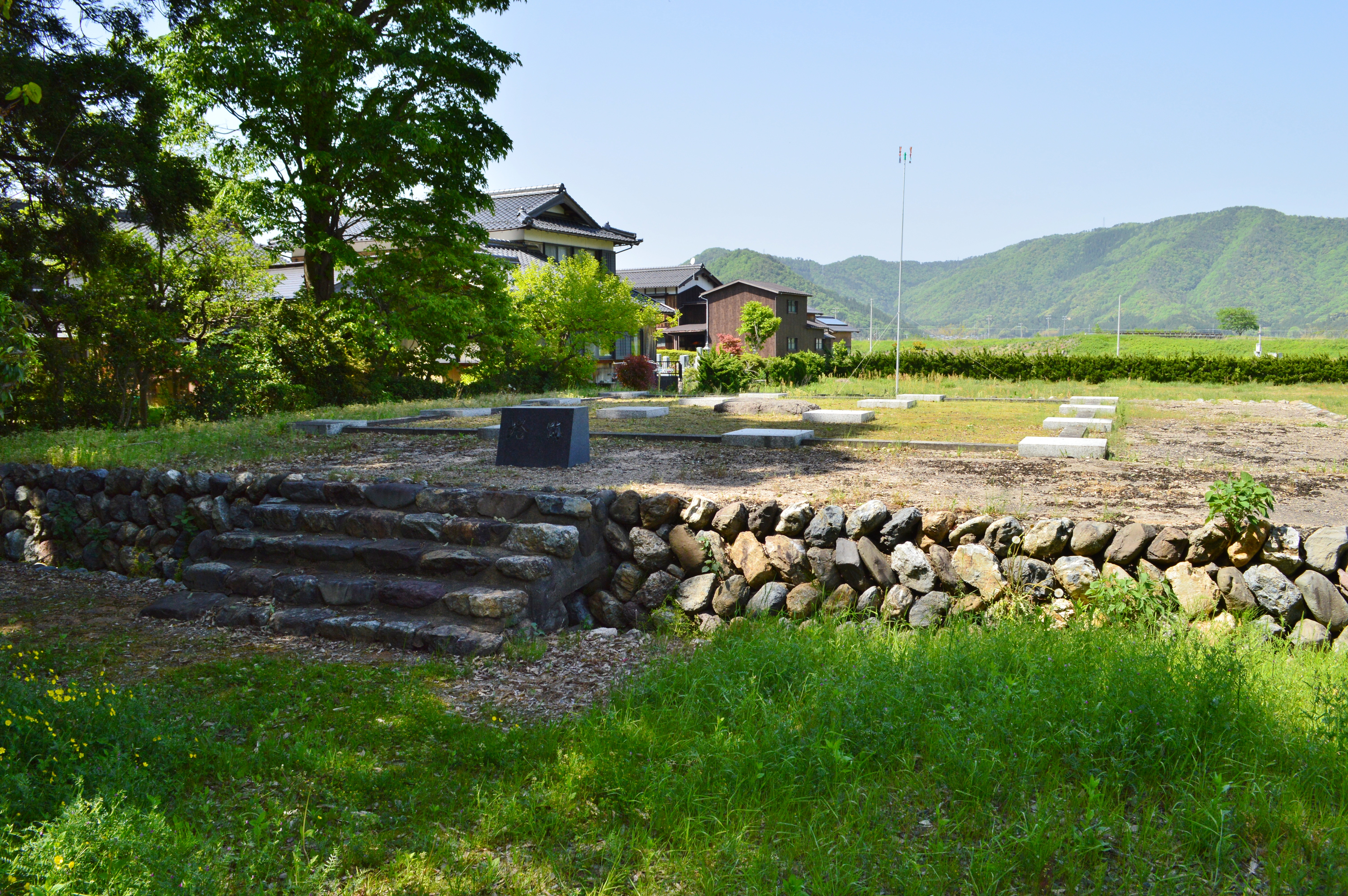
Site of the pagoda

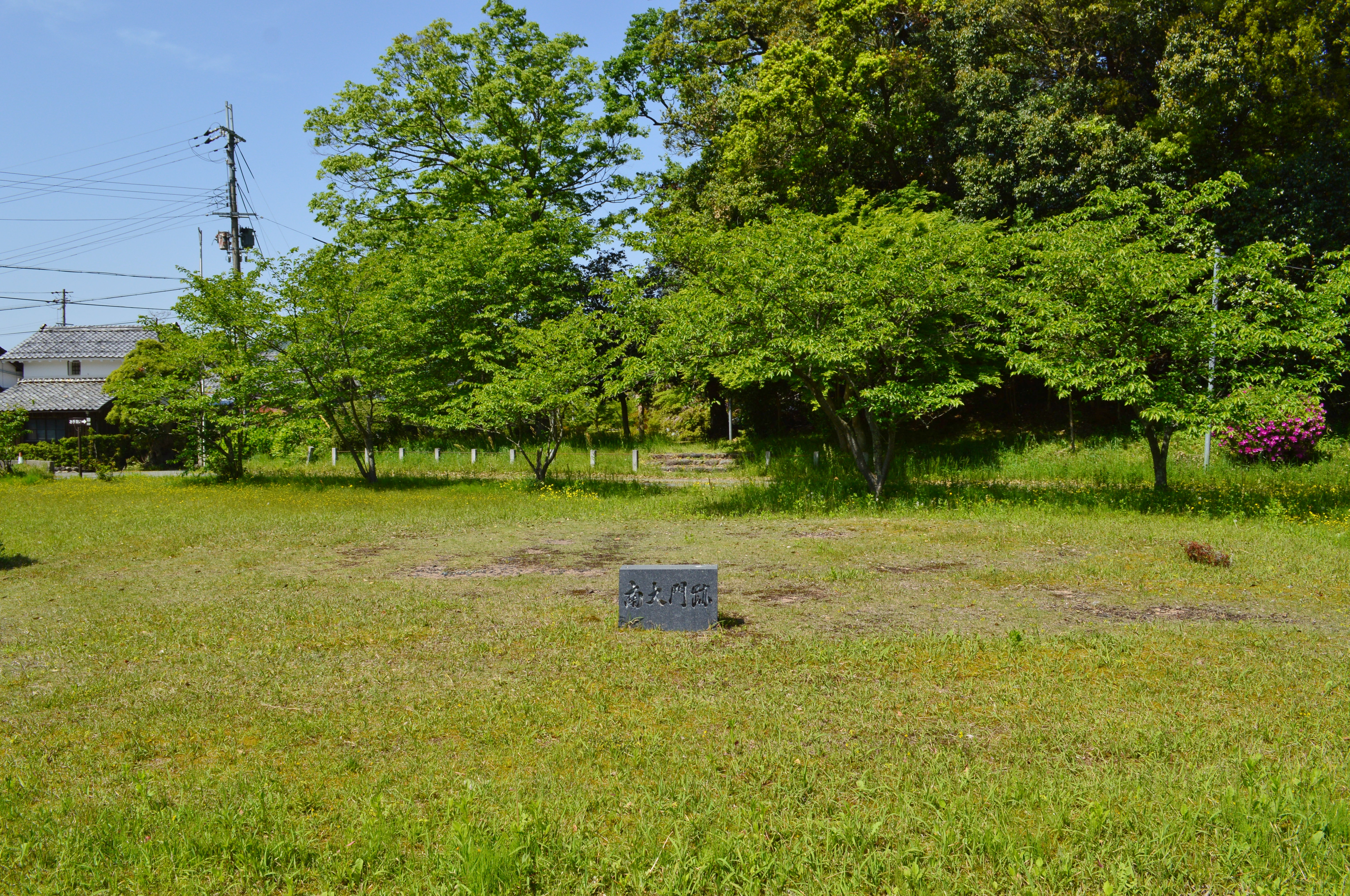
Site of the South Gate

== Cultural Properties ==
=== National Important Cultural Properties ===
- Wooden statue of standing Yakushi Nyorai (木造薬師如来坐像), Kamakura period; Enshrined in the Yakushi-do. Made of inlaid wood, the statue is 79.7 cm tall. According to an inscription on the statue, it was enshrined as the principal image of a nunnery in 1693 possibility the Wakasa Kokubn-niji

== See also ==
- List of Historic Sites of Japan (Fukui)
- provincial temple
