= Ōzan Kofun Cluster =

Burial mounds in Fukui Prefecture, Japan

- 王山古墳群 (Japanese)
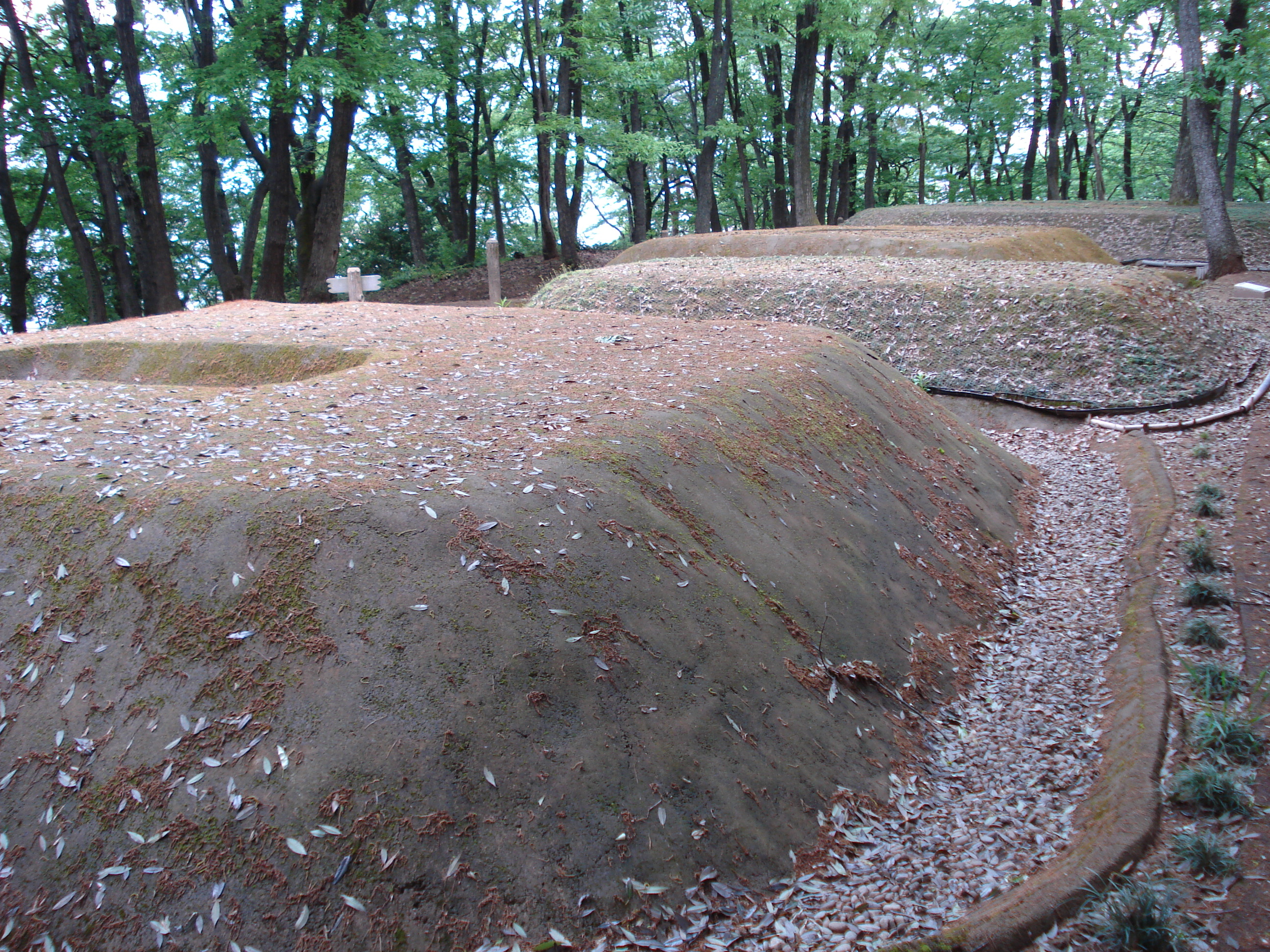
- Ōzan Kofun Cluster

- Ōzan Kofun Ōzan Kofun Cluster (Japan)
- 35°56′23.0″N 136°11′5.6″E
- Type: kofun
- Periods: Kofun period
- Location: Sabae, Fukui, Japan
- Region: Hokuriku region

History
- Built: 3rd to 4th century AD

Site notes
- Public access: Yes (park)

Ōzan Kofun Cluster (王山古墳群, Ōzan Kofun gun) is a group of kofun burial mounds located in what is now the Hinode area of the city of Sabae, Fukui in the Hokuriku region of Japan. The site was designated a National Historic Site of Japan in 1967.

== Overview ==
The Ōzan Kofun Cluster is located on an isolated hill with an elevation of 62 meters near the centre of the modern city of Sabae, and consists of 49 tumuli dating to the late Yayoi period through the early Kofun period. The area was originally designated a protected area in 1942; however, after a detailed survey was conducted in 1967, it was determined that the area under protection did not include all of the site, whereas conversely a large portion of the protected area was not necessary. The borders of the area were revised and the new boundaries became a National Historic Site in 1967

A total of eleven tumuli were excavated in 1965 (No. 1–7, 9, 25, 31 and 32), of which No. 1, 3, 4, and 7 were square mounds (hōfun (方墳)), eight to twelve meters on each side with a height of one to two meters, and were dated to the late Yayoi period. All of the tombs had the remnants of a wooden sarcophagus, with the exception of No. 4, which had two. All of the tombs had grave goods, mostly pottery fragments, with the exception of No.1, which was completely bare. Tomb No. 3 had goods from the Tōkai region and Kansai region of Japan, indicating the existence of long-distance trade.

Tombs No. 5, 7, 9 and 25 were also square tombs, eight to fourteen meters on a side, but were dated from the early Kofun period, as indicated by the presence of fragments of swords and other weapons, and metal horse fittings found inside. Tomb No. 31 was a round tumulus with a diameter of twenty meters and a height of two meters, and Tomb No. 32 was also a round tumulus (empun (円墳)), but with a diameter of eight meters. Both were also dated to the early Kofun period, and contained many artifacts.

The tomb does not appear in any historical records and the name of rank of the person buried within is unknown. It is one of many similar tumuli which have been discovered in the area, which has been densely populated since the Yayoi and Kofun periods, and from its scale it must have been the tomb of a local chieftain or other person of importance.

The site is now preserved as a public park with walking trails, and is about a five-minute walk from Sabae Station on the JR West Hokuriku Main Line.

== See also ==
- List of Historic Sites of Japan (Fukui)
