= Kōdōji temple ruins =

- 興道寺廃寺跡
- Location within Fukui Prefecture Location within Japan

Religion
- Affiliation: Buddhist
- Deity: unknown
- Rite: unknown
- Status: ruins (no public facilities)

Location
- Location: Mihama, Fukui
- Country: Japan
- Interactive map of Kōdōji temple ruins
- Coordinates: 35°35′55″N 135°56′38″E

Architecture
- Completed: Nara period

The Kōdōji temple ruins (興道寺廃寺跡, Kōdōji Haiji ato) is an archaeological site with the ruins of a Buddhist temple located in what is now the town of Mihama, Fukui, Japan. The temple no longer exists, but the temple grounds were designated as a National Historic Site in 2018.

== Overview ==
The temple ruins were comprehensively excavated from 2002 to 2014, and the complete layout of a major Nara period temple was uncovered.The precincts covered an area of 118 meters north-to-south by 80 meters east-to-west. The foundations of the South Gate, Middle Gate and Kondō, Pagoda and Lecture Hall were uncovered. The arrangement of these structures had the pagoda on the right and Kondō on the left, and was thus pattered after the temple of Hokki-ji in Ikaruga, Nara. The inner compound was surrounded by a cloister. The main structures were built from the latter half of the 7th century to the first half of the 8th century, with the Lecture Hall following in the middle of the 8th century. The pagoda was rebuilt before the latter half of the 8th century, and the main hall was rebuilt in the latter half of the 8th century to the latter half of the 9th century. The temple is thought to have been built by a powerful clan ruling Mikata County in Wakasa Province from the latter half of the 7th century. Artifacts found include earthenware, roof tiles, coins, and part of a Buddha statue. The temple is believed to have survived until the beginning of the 10th century, although no written records of it exist, and its name is unknown.

The site is located in a farm area and there are no public facilities.

== See also ==
- List of Historic Sites of Japan (Fukui)
