= Rokuroseyama Kofun Cluster =

Group of kofun burial mounds in Japan

Rokuroseyama Kofun
- 六呂瀬山古墳群 (Japanese)
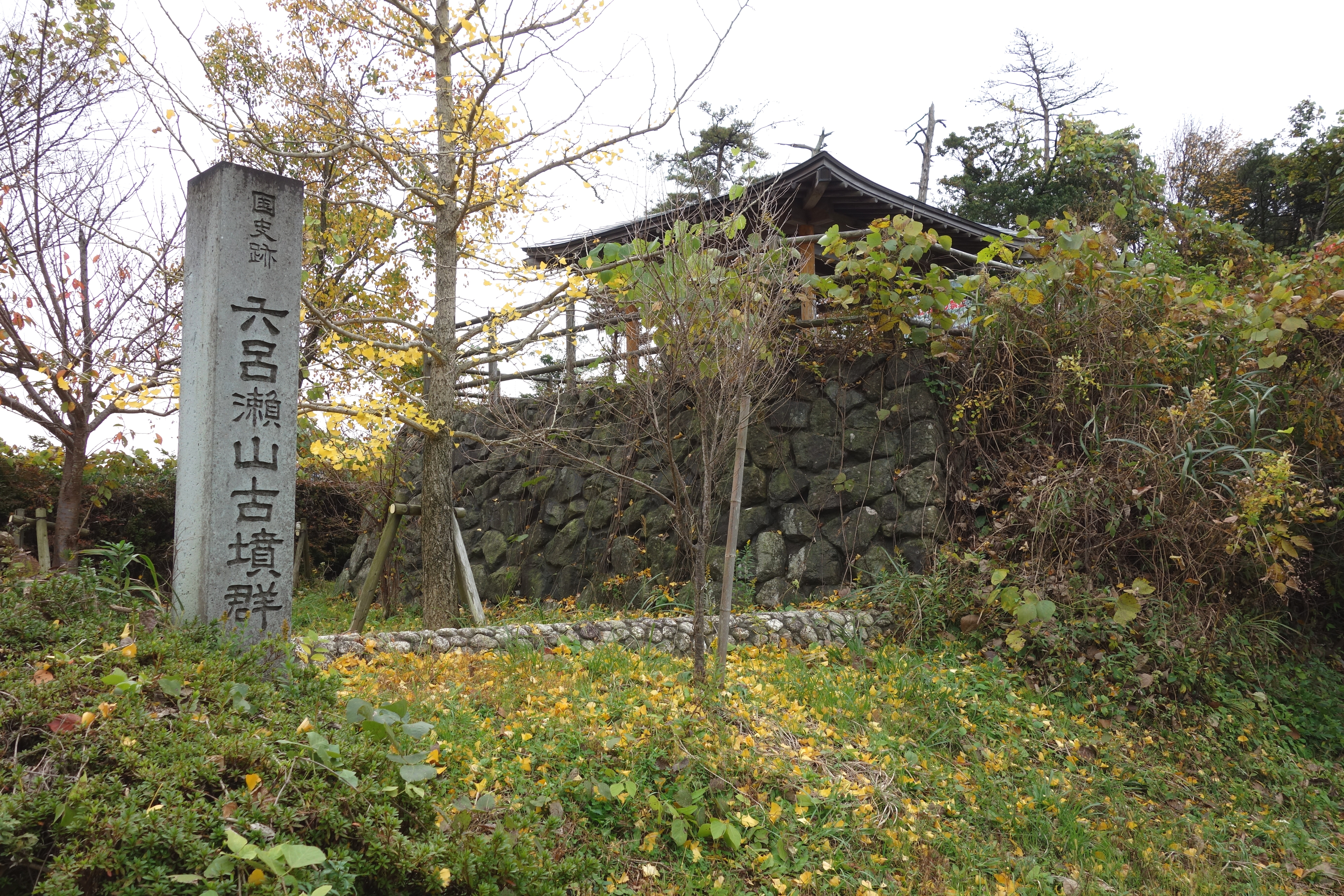
- Rokuroseyama Kofun

- Rokuroseyama Kofun Rokuroseyama Kofun Cluster (Japan)
- 36°07′02.9″N 136°18′54.8″E
- Type: kofun
- Periods: Kofun period
- Location: Sakai, Fukui, Japan
- Region: Hokuriku region

History
- Built: late 4th or early 5th century AD

Site notes
- Public access: Yes (no public facilities)

The Rokuroseyama Kofun Cluster (六呂瀬山古墳群, Rokuroseyama Kofun-gun) is a group kofun burial mounds located in the Maruoka neighborhood of the city of Sakai, Fukui in the Hokuriku region of Japan. The site was designated a National Historic Site of Japan in 1990.

== Overview ==
The Rokuroseyama Kofun Cluster is located on a hillside at an elevation of 50 to 200 meters above sea level, and consists of at least 130 circular, rectangular and keyhole-shape tumuli, collectively known as the Maruoka Kofun Cluster (丸岡古墳群, Maruoka Kofun-gun), of which the Rokuroseyama Kofun Cluster is the portion towards the southeast of the site, at the highest elevation, overlooking the Kuzuryū River. The site consists of two very large zenpō-kōen-fun (前方後円墳), which are shaped like a keyhole, having one square end and one circular end, when viewed from above (designated No.1 and No.3), and two rectangular-type (hōfun (方墳)), designated No. 2 and No. 4). The tumuli are estimated to date from the late 4th to the early 5th century AD. The tombs do not appear in any historical records and the name of rank of the person buried within is unknown.

== The Kofun ==
Kofun No.1 is located at an elevation of 200 meters at the ridgeline of the hill, with a north-south orientation. With a total length of 147 meters, it is the largest found in the Hokuriku region. The posterior circular portion of the tomb in on the northern end, and has a diameter of 78 meters and a height of 13 meters. The anterior rectangular portion has a length of 52 meters, width of 58 meters and height of 11 meters in two tiers. Large numbers of fukiishi and haniwa in cylindrical, morning-glory, or house shapes, were found in the area. The circular portion contains a semi-circular burial chamber with dimensions of 27 x 15 meters with a height of 4.2 meters, which had been broken into and robbed at some indeterminate time. Fragments of a tuff boat-shaped sarcophagus were found scattered on the floor.

Kofun No.2 is a rectangular tumulus with dimensions of 16 meters east-west by 11 meters north-south, and a height of 2.2 meters and is located to the east of Kofun No.1. It appears to have been an auxiliary structure to Kofun No.1, but contained no fukiishi and no haniwa.

Kofun No.3 is also a large keyhole-shaped tumulus located at the ridgeline of the hill, but with an east-west orientation. It has a length of 85 meters, with the posterior circular portion having a diameter of 48 meters and a height of 11 meters. The anterior rectangular portion has a length of 37 meters, width of 48 meters and height of nine meters in two tiers. Large numbers of fukuiishi, as well as a large variety of haniwa (cylindrical, house-shaped, trapezoidal, etc.) were found. The burial chamber is orientated to the north, with dimensions of 11 by 11 meters and a height of 1.1 meters. The tumulus appears to have been built later than Kofun No.1.

Kofun No.4 is also a rectangular tumulus with dimensions of 13 meters east-west by 16 meters north-south, and a height of 2.7 meters, located to the east of Kofun No.1. It appears to have been an auxiliary structure to Kofun No.3.

The site is about a 30-minute walk from Shiizakai Station on the Echizen Railway Katsuyama Eiheiji Line.

== See also ==
- List of Historic Sites of Japan (Fukui)
