= Eishō =

Eishō or Eisho may refer to:

- Eishō (Heian period) (永承), Japanese era from 1046 to 1053
- Eishō (Muromachi period) (永正), Japanese era from 1504 to 1521
- Empress Eishō (英照), empress consort of Emperor Kōmei of Japan
- Chōkōsai Eishō, (fl. 1795–1801), Japanese artist
- Eisho Higa, singer
