= Kashimagari Tunnel =

Pedestrian tunnel in Tsuruga, Japan

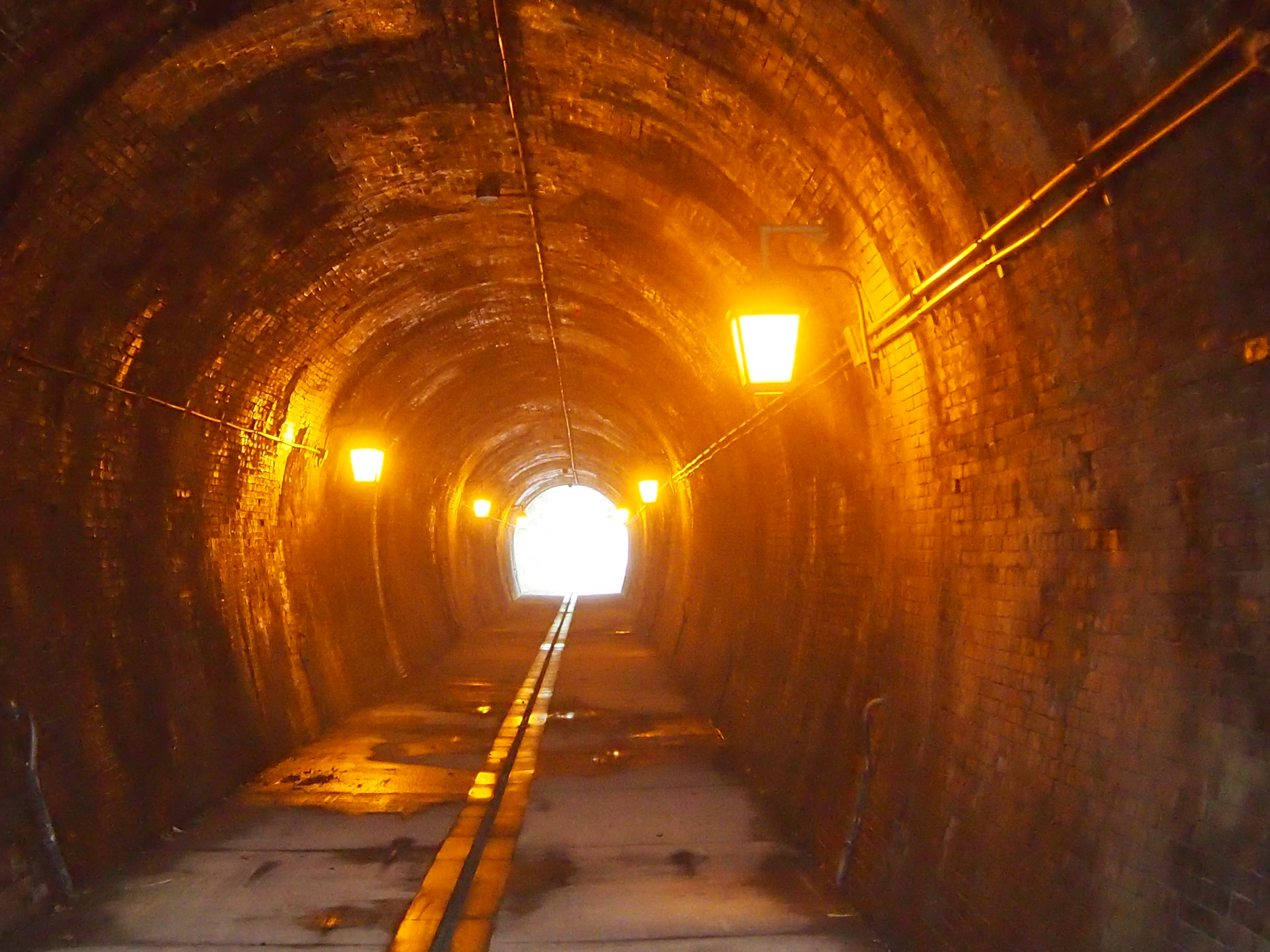
- Kashimagari Tunnel built in 1893
- Interactive map of Kashimagari Tunnel

Overview
- Line: Japan National Route 47
- Location: Tsuruga, Fukui
- Coordinates: 35°39′46.5408″N 136°6′22.3338″E
- Status: active

Operation
- Opened: 1893
- Character: Pedistrian

Technical
- Line length: 87 m
- No. of tracks: 2

Kashimagari Tunnel (樫曲トンネル, Kashimagari tonneru) is a tunnel for pedestrians on Japan National Route 476 or former Hokuriku line located in Kashimagari, Tsuruga city, Fukui prefecture with length of 87 m and width of 3.9 m. It was built and completed in 1893 (during Meiji era), and it is a Japan tangible cultural property heritage site (of building registered in February 2016).

== See also ==
- List of tunnels in Japan
- Seikan Tunnel Tappi Shakō Line
- Sakhalin–Hokkaido Tunnel
- Bohai Strait tunnel
