= List of mergers in Fukui Prefecture =

Here is a list of mergers in Fukui Prefecture, Japan since the Heisei era.

== Mergers from April 1, 1999 to Present ==
- On March 1, 2004 - the former town of Awara absorbed the town of Kanazu (both from Sakai District) to create the city of Awara.
- On January 1, 2005 - the towns of Imajō and Nanjō, and the village of Kōno (all from Nanjō District) were merged to create the town of Minamiechizen.
- On February 1, 2005 - the towns of Asahi and Ota, and the village of Miyazaki (all from Nyū District) were merged into the expanded town to create the new town of Echizen.
- On March 31, 2005 - the town of Kaminaka (from Onyū District), and the town of Mikata (from Mikata District) were merged to create the town of Wakasa (in the newly created Mikatakaminaka District).
- On October 1, 2005 - the city of Takefu was merged with the town of Imadate (from Imadate District) to create the city of Echizen.
- On November 7, 2005 - the village of Izumi (from Ōno District) was merged into the expanded city of Ōno. Ōno District was dissolved as a result of this merger.
- On February 1, 2006 - the town of Miyama (from Asuwa District), the town of Shimizu, and the village of Koshino (both from Nyū District), were merged into the expanded city of Fukui. Asuwa District was dissolved as a result of this merger.
- On February 13, 2006 - the town of Matsuoka, and the village of Kamishihi (both from Yoshida District) were merged into the expanded town of Eiheiji.
- On March 3, 2006 - the village of Natashō (from Onyū District) was merged into the expanded town of Ōi (in Ōi District). Onyū District was dissolved as a result of this merger. Therefore, all villages in Fukui Prefecture have been dissolved.
- On March 20, 2006 - the former town of Sakai absorbed the towns of Harue, Maruoka and Mikuni (all from Sakai District) to create the city of Sakai. Sakai District was dissolved as a result of this merger.
