= Nakatsuka Kofun =

Kofun burial mound in Japan

- 中塚古墳 (Japanese)
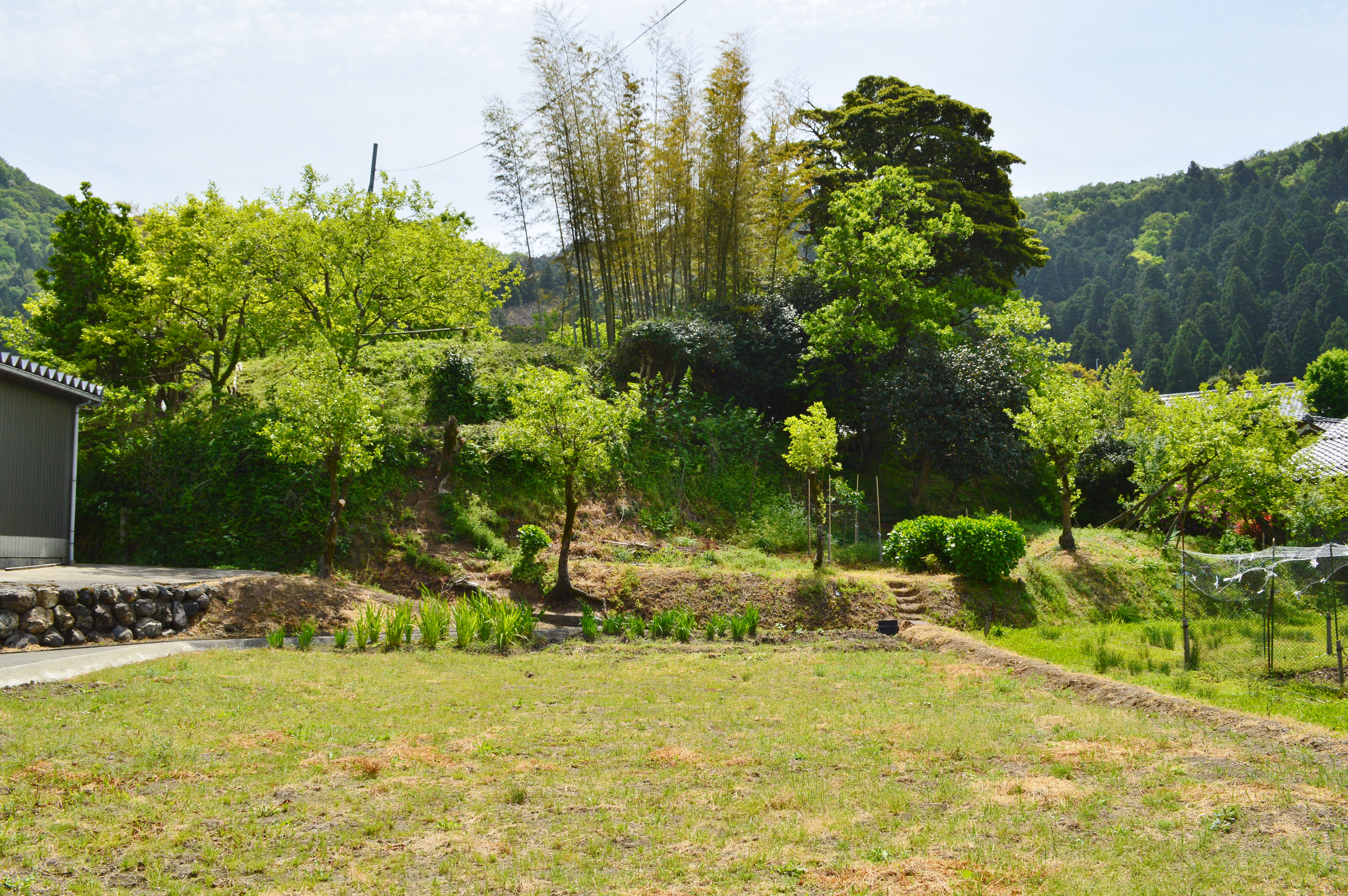
- Nakatsuka Kofun

- Nakatsuka Kofun Nakatsuka Kofun (Japan)
- 35°28′2.35″N 135°52′32.84″E
- Type: kofun
- Periods: Kofun period
- Location: Wakasa, Fukui, Japan
- Region: Hokuriku region

History
- Built: 5th to 6th century AD

Site notes
- Public access: Yes (no public facilities)

The Nakatsuka Kofun (中塚古墳, Nakatsuka Kofun) is a kofun burial mound located in what is now part of the town of Wakasa, Fukui in the Hokuriku region of Japan. The site was designated a National Historic Site of Japan in 1935.

== Overview ==
The Nakatsuka Kofun is one of a group of seven kofun located in the Wakibukuro neighborhood of central Wakasa, forming the Jōnozuka Kofun Cluster. It is west of the tracks of the JR West Obama Line railway and near a hill called (Zenbuyama, 膳部山). The tumulus is a zenpō-kōen-fun (前方後円墳), which is shaped like a keyhole, having one square end and one circular end, when viewed from above. The Nakatsuka Kofun is in relatively poor preservation, as much has been destroyed over the centuries by agricultural activity and as a source of soil. The tumulus has a two-tier structure with fukiishi, orientated north-south, with the posterior circular portion on the northern end. The total length is 72 meters and the circular portion has a diameter of 46 meters and height of six meters, and the anterior rectangular portion has a width of 26 meters. Some fragments of cylindrical haniwa have been found in the vicinity; however, the structure of the tumulus has never been properly archaeological excavation excavated by archaeologists and the inner structure is unknown; however, a ground-penetrating radar survey in 2008 indicated the presence of a passage grave burial chamber similar to that of the Jōnozuka Kofun. Traces of a shield-shaped moat have also been found.

The tumulus dates from the late 5th century to early 6th century AD. The name of the person interred is unknown; however from the name of the nearby hill (Zenbuyama, 膳部山), it mostly likely corresponds to the grave of a head of the Kashiwade clan (膳氏), who are recorded in the Kojiki and Nihon Shoki as having served as Kuni no miyatsuko of Wakasa Province since the time of the legendary Emperor Kōgen.

The tumulus is about 30 minutes on foot from Kaminaka Station on the JR West Obama Line.

Jōnozuka Kofun Cluster
Name	Type	Length	date
Jōnozuka Kofun	keyhole	100m	early 5th century
Shiroyama Kofun	keyhole	63m	mid 5th century
Nishizuka Kofun	keyhole	74m	end 5th century
Nakatsuka Kofun	keyhole	72m	late 5th century
Jūsen-no-mori Kofun	keyhole	68m	early 6th century
Kamifunazuka Kofun	keyhole	70m	early 6th century
Shimofunazuka Kofun	keyhole	85m	mid 6th century

== See also ==
- List of Historic Sites of Japan (Fukui)
