= Jōnozuka Kofun =

Kofun burial mound in Japan

- 上ノ塚古墳 (Japanese)
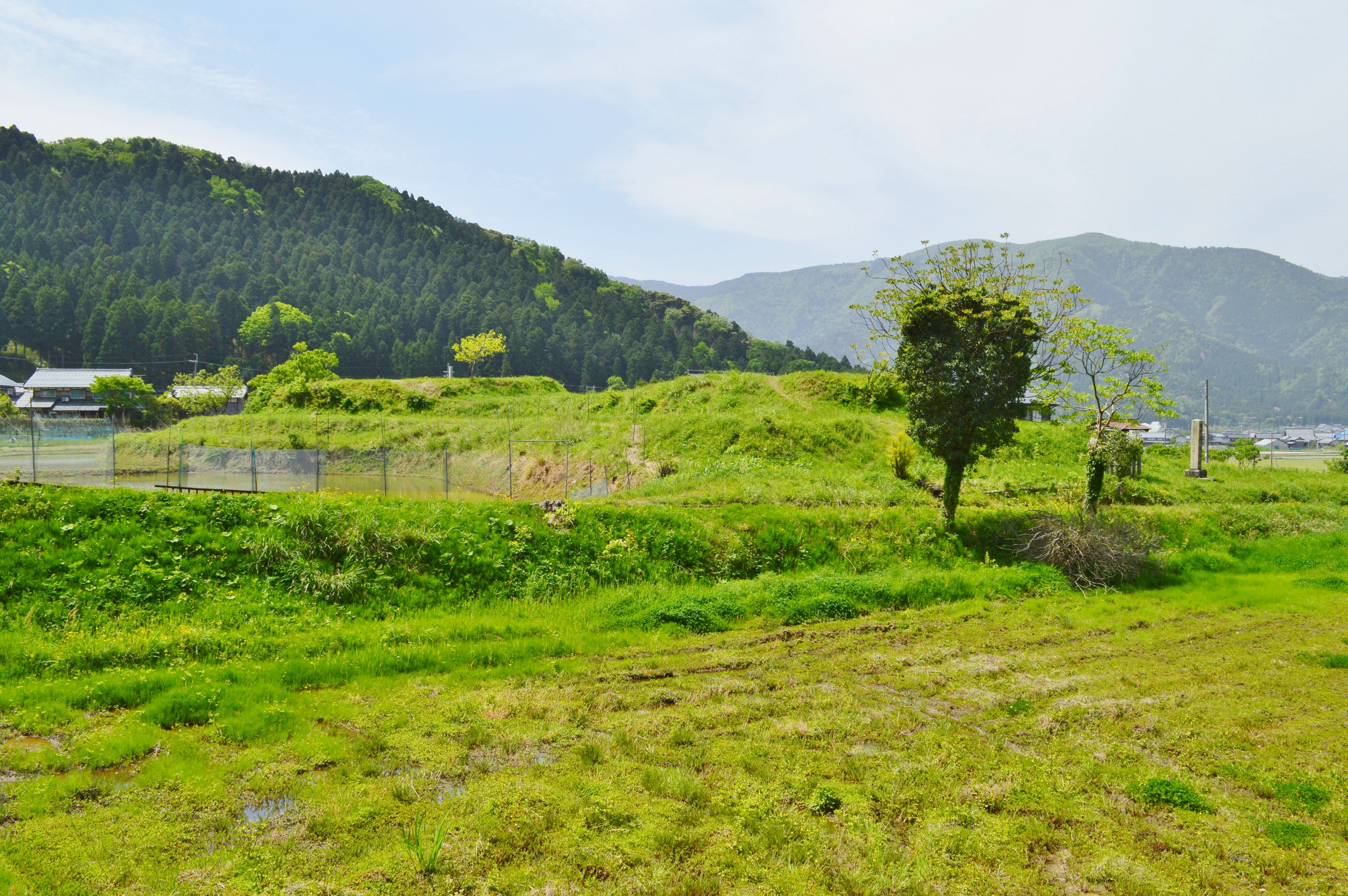
- Jōnozuka Kofun

- Jōnozuka Kofun Jōnozuka Kofun (Japan)
- 35°28′4.4″N 135°52′28.36″E
- Type: kofun
- Periods: Kofun period
- Location: Wakasa, Fukui, Japan
- Region: Hokuriku region

History
- Built: 4th to 5th century AD

Site notes
- Public access: Yes (no facilities)

The Jōnozuka Kofun (上ノ塚古墳, Jōnozuka Kofun) is a kofun burial mound located in the Wakibukuro neighborhood of the town of Wakasa, Fukui in the Hokuriku region of Japan. The site was designated a National Historic Site of Japan in 1935. It is the largest keyhole-shaped tumulus in the Wakasa region and was built from the end of the 4th century to the early 5th century AD.

== Overview ==
The Jōnozuka Kofun is one of a group of seven kofun located in central Wakasa at the western foot of Mount Zenbu. It is located west of the tracks of the JR West Obama Line railway and is in the center of the group. Together with the Nishizuka Kofun and the Nakatsuka Kofun, it was known to local legend as the tomb of one of the "Kings of Wakasa". The tumulus is a zenpō-kōen-fun (前方後円墳), which is shaped like a keyhole, having one square end and one circular end, when viewed from above. The entire length is about 100 meters in three tiers, with the posterior circular portion having a diameter of 64 meters, and the width of the anterior rectangular portion at 48 meters with a length of 36 meters. It is orientated to the north. It has retained most of its original shape, and the existence of the former moat can be confirmed. The round portion of the tumulus has a height of six meters and was covered in fukiishi. Fragments of haniwa of various types have been found in the surrounding fields.

Currently, the site of the moat is under rice paddies and the tumulus is surrounded by farmland. The site was excavated in 1992, and in 2008 by ground-penetrating radar.The grave goods discovered, mostly pieces of wood and metal, included items of Korean and Chinese origin, and are displayed at the Wakasa Museum of History and Culture. The name of the person interred is unknown; however from the name of the nearby hill (Zenbuyama, 膳部山), it mostly likely corresponds to the grave of a head of the Kashiwade clan (膳氏), who are recorded in the Kojiki and Nihon Shoki as having served as Kuni no miyatsuko of Wakasa Province since the time of the legendary Emperor Kōgen.

The tumulus is about 30 minutes on foot from Kaminaka Station on the JR West Obama Line.

Jōnozuka Kofun Cluster
Name	Type	Length	date
Jōnozuka Kofun	keyhole	100m	early 5th century
Shiroyama Kofun	keyhole	63m	mid 5th century
Nishizuka Kofun	keyhole	74m	end 5th century
Nakatsuka Kofun	keyhole	72m	late 5th century
Jūsen-no-mori Kofun	keyhole	68m	early 6th century
Kamifunazuka Kofun	keyhole	70m	early 6th century
Shimofunazuka Kofun	keyhole	85m	mid 6th century

== See also ==
- List of Historic Sites of Japan (Fukui)
