= Nishizuka Kofun =

Kofun burial mound in Japan

- 西塚古墳 (Japanese)
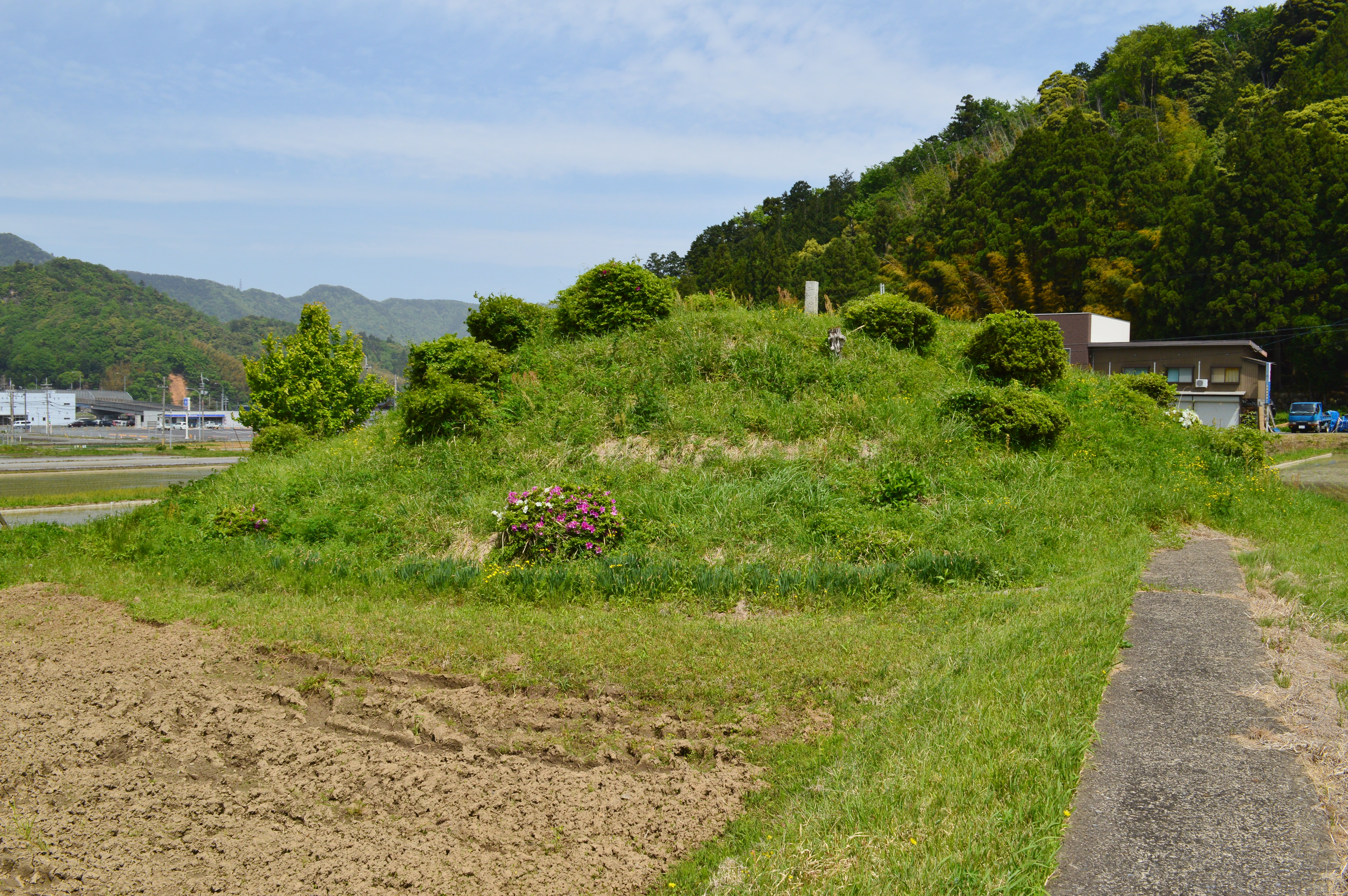
- Nishizuka Kofun

- Nishizuka Kofun Nishizuka Kofun (Japan)
- 35°28′5.94″N 135°52′23.76″E
- Type: kofun
- Periods: Kofun period
- Location: Wakasa, Fukui, Japan
- Region: Hokuriku region

History
- Built: 5th century AD

Site notes
- Public access: Yes (no public facilities)

Nishizuka Kofun (西塚古墳, Nishizuka Kofun) is a kofun burial mound located in what is now part of the town of Wakasa, Fukui in the Hokuriku region of Japan. The site was designated a National Historic Site of Japan in 1935.

== Overview ==
The Nishizuka Kofun is one of a group of seven kofun located in the Wakibukuro neighborhood of central Wakasa, forming the Jōnozuka Kofun Cluster. It is located west of the tracks of the JR West Obama Line railway and to the west of the Jōnozuka Kofun. The tumulus is a zenpō-kōen-fun (前方後円墳), which is shaped like a keyhole, having one square end and one circular end, when viewed from above. The entire length is about 74 meters, with the posterior circular portion having a diameter of 39 meters, and the width of the anterior rectangular portion at 47 meters. However, most of the rectangular portion of the structure was destroyed during the construction of the Obama Line railroad in August 1916, and only the posterior circular portion of tumulus survives isolated in the middle of a rice field. The round portion has a height of 6.7 meters and was covered in fukiishi. Fragments of haniwa have been found in the surrounding fields. The haniwa was recognized to have the characteristics of the Kibi and Owari regions, indicating some relationship with those regions. The tumulus was also originally surrounded by a 20-meter wide moat.

During the railroad construction in 1918, the 5.46 x 1.3 meter stone vertical-style burial chamber was discovered and numerous burial goods were excavated. The burial chamber had a height of 1.5 meters and was painted red with cinnabar. Bronze mirrors, possibly of Chinese origin, magatama and cylindrical beads, gold earrings, metal belt fittings, horse ornaments, and weapons including swords, spears and fragments of armor were found, all of which are currently in the possession of the Museum of the Imperial Collections in Tokyo. Judging from these artifacts, the tumulus was constructed in the late 5th century AD (the middle Kofun period), and it has been speculated that this is the tomb of Kashiwade-no-Omi Ikaruga, which is mentioned in the Nihon Shoki as one of the Kuni no miyatsuko of Wakasa Province.

The site was subsequently excavated in 1970 and in 1991, and in 2008 by ground-penetrating radar. The tumulus is located about 30 minutes on foot from Kaminaka Station on the JR West Obama Line.

Jōnozuka Kofun Cluster
Name	Type	Length	date
Jōnozuka Kofun	keyhole	100m	early 5th century
Shiroyama Kofun	keyhole	63m	mid 5th century
Nishizuka Kofun	keyhole	74m	end 5th century
Nakatsuka Kofun	keyhole	72m	late 5th century
Jūsen-no-mori Kofun	keyhole	68m	early 6th century
Kamifunazuka Kofun	keyhole	70m	early 6th century
Shimofunazuka Kofun	keyhole	85m	mid 6th century

== See also ==
- List of Historic Sites of Japan (Fukui)
