= Fukui 2nd district =

- Parliamentary constituency for the Japanese House of Representatives
- Numbered map of the Fukui Prefecture single seats
- Prefecture: Fukui
- Proportional District: Hokuriku-Shin'etsu
- Electorate: 253,471

Current constituency
- Created: 1994
- Seats: One
- Party: LDP
- Representative: Takeshi Saiki
- Municipalities: Echizen, Obama, Sabae, Tsuruga District, Imadate District, Mikata District, Minamikaminaka District, Nanjō District, Nyū District, and Ōi District.

Fukui 2nd district (福井県第2区, Fukui-ken dai-niku or simply 福井2区, Fukui-niku) is a single-member constituency of the House of Representatives in the national Diet of Japan located in Ehime Prefecture.

== Areas covered ==
=== Since 2013 ===
- Echizen
- Obama
- Sabae
- Tsuruga District
- Imadate District
- Mikata District
- Minamikaminaka District
- Nanjō District
- Nyū District
- Ōi District

== List of representatives ==
Election	Representative	Party	Notes
1996	Takamori Makino	LDP	
2000	Takamori Makino	LDP	
2003	Taku Yamamoto	LDP	
2005	Taku Yamamoto	LDP	
2009	Taku Yamamoto	LDP	
2012	Taku Yamamoto	LDP	
2014	Tsuyoshi Takagi	LDP	
2017	Tsuyoshi Takagi	LDP	
2021	Tsuyoshi Takagi	LDP	
2024	Hideyuki Tsuji	CDP	
2024	Hideyuki Tsuji	CRA	
2026	Takeshi Saiki	LDP	

== Election results ==
=== 2026 ===
2026
Party	Candidate	Votes	%	±%
LDP	Takeshi Saiki	78,737	59.95	N/A
Centrist Reform	Hideyuki Tsuji	52,607	40.05	
Majority		26,130	19.90	
Registered electors		252,020		
Turnout			54.31	▼5.64
LDP gain from Centrist Reform				

=== 2024 ===
2024
Party	Candidate	Votes	%	±%
CDP	Hideyuki Tsuji	54,100	36.32	
Ishin	Takeshi Saiki (Won PR seat)	38,749	26.01	New
Independent	Tsuyoshi Takagi	33,532	22.51	New
Independent	Taku Yamamoto	18,656	12.52	New
JCP	Shigeomi Oyanagi	3,934	2.64	N/A
Majority		15,351	10.31	
Registered electors		255,333		
Turnout			59.95	▲0.83
CDP gain from Independent				

=== 2021 ===
2021
Party	Candidate	Votes	%	±%
LDP	Tsuyoshi Takagi	81,705	53.86	
CDP	Takeshi Saiki	69,984	46.14	New
Majority		11,721	7.72	
Registered electors		262,612		
Turnout			59.12	▲1.59
LDP hold				

=== 2017 ===
2017
Party	Candidate	Votes	%	±%
LDP	Tsuyoshi Takagi	80,895	54.18	
Kibō no Tō	Takeshi Saiki (Won PR seat)	55,537	37.20	New
JCP	Takumi Saruhashi	12,873	8.62	
Majority		25,358	16.98	
Registered electors		269,460		
Turnout			57.53	▲5.61
LDP hold				
