= Takeshi Saiki =

Japanese politician (born 1974)

- 斉木 武志

Member of the House of Representatives
- Incumbent
- Assumed office 1 November 2024
- Preceded by: Multi-member district
- Constituency: Hokuriku-Shin'etsu PR (2024–2026); Fukui 2nd (2026–present)
- In office 27 October 2017 – 14 October 2021
- Constituency: Hokuriku-Shin'etsu PR
- In office 4 September 2009 – 16 November 2012
- Constituency: Tōkai PR

Member of the Fukui Prefectural Assembly
- In office 30 April 2023 – 15 October 2024
- Constituency: Echizen City & Imadate District & Nanjō District

Personal details
- Born: 13 May 1974 (age 52) Kōfu, Yamanashi, Japan
- Party: LDP (since 2026)
- Other political affiliations: DPJ (2009–2015); Independent (2015–2016; 2021–2024; 2025–2026); DP (2016–2017); KnT (2017–2018); DPP (2018–2020); CDP (2020–2021); JIP (2024–2025)
- Education: University of Tokyo

Takeshi Saiki (斉木武志, Saiki Takeshi; born 13 May 1974) is a Japanese politician. He has been a member of the House of Representatives since 2024, having previously served from 2009 to 2012 and from 2017 to 2021. He previously worked as an announcer at NHK.
