= Fusa =

Fusa may refer to:

== People with the given name ==
- Fusa Miyake (Born 1987), Japanese cosmic ray physicist
- Fusa Tatsumi (巽フサ) (1907–2023) Japanese supercentenarian
- Fusa Tomita (冨田 ふさ; 1893–1954), Japanese physician and politician

== Places ==
=== Colombia ===
- Fusa, the commonly used name for the Colombian town of Fusagasugá

=== Japan ===
- Fusa or Fussa, a town in Tokyo, Japan
- Fusa Province, an ancient province in Japan
- Fusa Station, a railway station in Japan

=== Norway ===
- Fusa Municipality, a former municipality in the old Hordaland county, Norway
- Fusa (village), a village in Bjørnafjorden municipality in Vestland county, Norway
- Fusa Church, a church in Bjørnafjorden municipality in Vestland county, Norway

== Music ==
- Fusa, a value in mensural notation corresponding to the modern eighth note
- Fusa, the modern Spanish word for a thirty-second note

== Animals ==
- Thallarcha fusa, an Australian moth
- Fossa (animal) (pronounced FOO-sa), a mammal endemic to the island of Madagascar

== Other uses ==
- Fus'ha or fusa, a collective term referring to the standardized, non-spoken varieties of the Arabic language
- Functional safety
- Fairfield University Student Association, a student organization at Fairfield University
- Flinders University Student Association, a student organisation at Flinders University

== See also ==
- Fussa
