= Wakasa-Arita Station =

Railway station in Wakasa, Fukui Prefecture, Japan

Wakasa-Arita Station 若狭有田駅
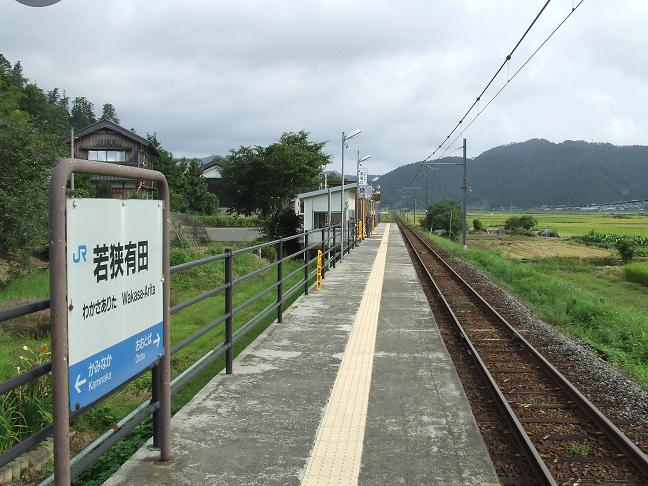
- Wakasa-Arita Station platform in August 2009

General information
- Location: 15–16, Arida, Wakasa-cho, Mikatakaminaka-gun, Fukui-ken 919-1507; Japan
- Coordinates: 35°29′08″N 135°52′06″E
- Operator: JR West
- Line: ■ Obama Line
- Distance: 35.4 km from Tsuruga
- Platforms: 1 side platform
- Tracks: 1

Other information
- Status: Unstaffed
- Website: Official website

History
- Opened: 20 June 1964; 62 years ago

Passengers
- FY 2023: 102 daily
Location
- Location within Japan

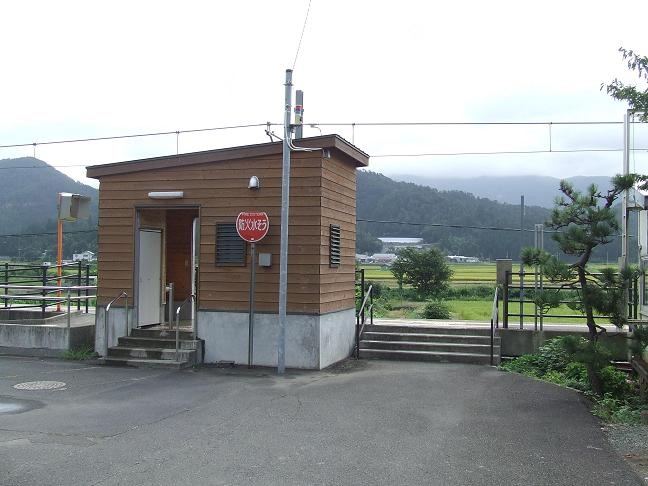
Toilets at Wakasa-Arita Station

Wakasa-Arita Station (若狭有田駅, Wakasa-Arita-eki) is a railway station in the town of Wakasa, Mikatakaminaka District, Fukui Prefecture, Japan, operated by West Japan Railway Company (JR West).

== Lines ==
Wakasa-Arita Station is served by the Obama Line, and is located 35.4 kilometers from the terminus of the line at Tsuruga.

== Station layout ==
The station consists of one side platform serving a single bi-directional track. There is no station building, but only a shelter on the platform. The station is unattended.

== Adjacent stations ==
| « | Service | » |
Obama Line
Rapid: Does not stop at this station
| Ōtoba | Local | Kaminaka |

== History ==
Wakasa-Arita Station opened on 20 June 1964. With the privatization of Japanese National Railways (JNR) on 1 April 1987, the station came under the control of JR West.

== Passenger statistics ==
In fiscal 2016, the station was used by an average of 60 passengers daily (boarding passengers only).

== Surrounding area ==
- National Route 27

== See also ==
- List of railway stations in Japan
