= Tomura Station =

Railway station in Wakasa, Fukui Prefecture, Japan

Tomura Station 十村駅
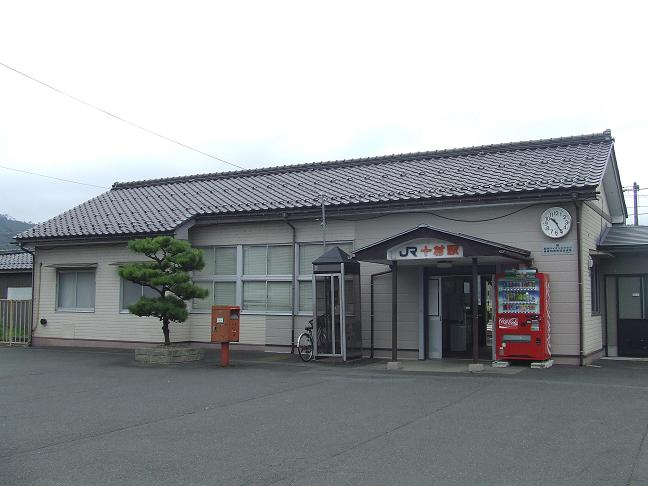
- Tomura Station in August 2009

General information
- Location: 37-17 Izaki, Wakasa-sho, Mikatakaminaka-gun, Fukui-ken 919-1316; Japan
- Coordinates: 35.5160°N 135.8967°E
- Operator: JR West
- Line: ■ Obama Line
- Distance: 29.3 km from Tsuruga
- Platforms: 1 island platform
- Tracks: 2

Other information
- Status: Unstaffed
- Website: Official website

History
- Opened: 15 December 1917; 108 years ago

Passengers
- FY 2023: 114 daily
Location
- Location within Japan

Tomura Station (十村駅, Tomura-eki) is a railway station in the town of Wakasa, Mikatakaminaka District, Fukui Prefecture, Japan, operated by West Japan Railway Company (JR West).

== Lines ==
Tomura Station is served by the Obama Line, and is located 29.3 kilometers from the terminus of the line at Tsuruga.

== Station layout ==
The station consists of one island platform connected to the station building by a level crossing. The station is unattended.

=== Platforms ===
| 1 | ■ Obama Line | for Tsuruga |
| 2 | ■ Obama Line | for Obama and Higashi-Maizuru |

== Adjacent stations ==
| « | Service | » |
Obama Line
| Mikata | Rapid | Kaminaka |
| Fujii | Local | Ōtoba |

== History ==
Tomura Station opened on 15 December 1917. With the privatization of Japanese National Railways (JNR) on 1 April 1987, the station came under the control of JR West.

== Passenger statistics ==
In fiscal 2016, the station was used by an average of 69 passengers daily (boarding passengers only).

== Surrounding area ==
- Tomura Post Office
- Misomi Elementary School

== See also ==
- List of railway stations in Japan
