= Mikata District =

Mikata District may refer to:

- Mikata District, Fukui, Japan
- Mikata District, Hyōgo, Japan
