= Ōtoba Station =

Ōtoba Station may refer to:

- Ōtoba Station (Fukui), a railway station in Fukui Prefecture, Japan
- Ōtoba Station (Gifu), a railway station in Gifu Prefecture, Japan
