= Ōtoba Station (Fukui) =

Railway station in Wakasa, Fukui Prefecture, Japan

Ōtoba Station 大鳥羽駅
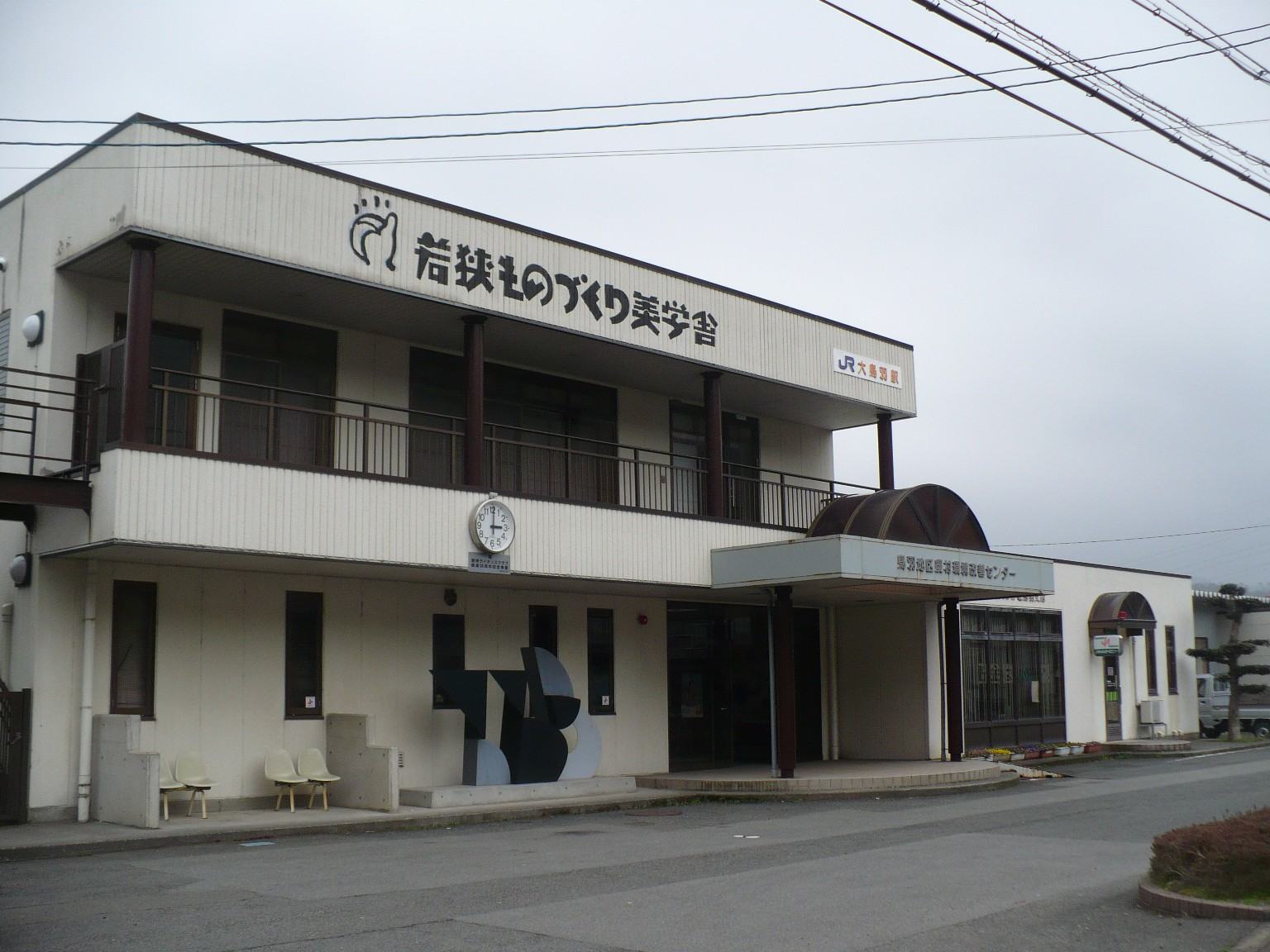
- Ōtoba Station in March 2010

General information
- Location: 27-13 Ōtoba, Wakasa-cho, Mikatakaminaka-gun, Fukui-ken 919-1504; Japan
- Coordinates: 35.5047°N 135.8667°E
- Operator: JR West
- Line: ■ Obama Line
- Distance: 33.3 km from Tsuruga
- Platforms: 1 side platform
- Tracks: 1

Other information
- Status: Staffed
- Website: Official website

History
- Opened: 10 November 1918; 107 years ago

Passengers
- FY 2023: 170 daily
Location
- Location within Japan

Ōtoba Station (大鳥羽駅, Ōtoba-eki) is a railway station in the town of Wakasa, Mikatakaminaka District, Fukui Prefecture, Japan. It is operated by West Japan Railway Company (JR West).

== Lines ==
Ōtoba Station is served by the Obama Line, and is located 33.3 kilometers from the terminus of the line at Tsuruga.

== Station layout ==
The station consists of one side platform serving a single bi-directional track. The station is staffed.

== Adjacent stations ==
«	Service	»
Obama Line
Rapid: Does not stop at this station
Tomura	Local	Wakasa-Arita

== History ==
Ōtoba Station opened on 10 November 1918. With the privatization of Japanese National Railways (JNR) on 1 April 1987, the station came under the control of JR West.

== Passenger statistics ==
In fiscal 2016, the station was used by an average of 117 passengers daily (boarding passengers only).

== Surrounding area ==
- Ōtoba Post Office
- Ōtoba Elementary School

== See also ==
- List of railway stations in Japan
