= Tsuyoshi Takagi =

Japanese politician

- 髙木 毅
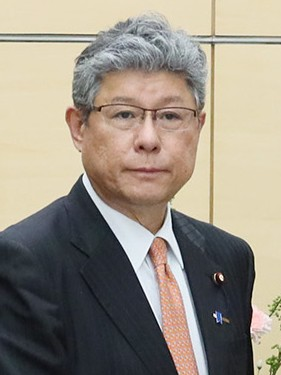
- Takagi in 2021

Minister for Reconstruction
- In office 7 October 2015 – 3 August 2016
- Prime Minister: Shinzo Abe
- Preceded by: Wataru Takeshita
- Succeeded by: Masahiro Imamura

Member of the House of Representatives
- In office 25 June 2000 – 9 October 2024
- Preceded by: Kazuhiko Tsuji
- Succeeded by: Hideyuki Tsuji
- Constituency: Fukui 3rd (2000–2014); Fukui 2nd (2014–2024)

Personal details
- Born: 16 January 1956 (age 70) Tsuruga, Fukui, Japan
- Party: Independent (since 2024)
- Other political affiliations: LDP (until 2024)
- Parent(s): Koichi Takagi (father, former Mayor of Tsuruga)
- Education: Aoyama Gakuin University (Bachelor of Laws, 1978)
- Occupation: Politician, businessman

Tsuyoshi Takagi (高木 毅, Takagi Tsuyoshi; born 16 January 1956) is a former Japanese politician who served in the House of Representatives in the Diet (national legislature) as a member of the Liberal Democratic Party.

== Overview ==
A native of Tsuruga, Fukui and graduate of Aoyama Gakuin University he was elected for the first time in 2000 after an unsuccessful run in 1996. Because of his involvement in the 2023–2024 Japanese slush fund scandal Takagi did not receive official endorsement from the LDP in the 2024 Japanese general election. Takagi ran as an independent in his constituency of Fukui 2nd district and lost his seat.

== Election History ==
| Election | Date | Constituency | Party | Votes | Vote Share | Result |
|---|---|---|---|---|---|---|
| 41st House Election | Oct 20, 1996 | Fukui 3rd District | LDP | 48,762 | 34.19% | Lost |
| 42nd House Election | Jun 25, 2000 | Fukui 3rd District | LDP | 81,698 | 52.55% | Won |
| 43rd House Election | Nov 9, 2003 | Fukui 3rd District | LDP | 85,113 | 59.82% | Won |
| 44th House Election | Sep 11, 2005 | Fukui 3rd District | LDP | 93,451 | 60.82% | Won |
| 45th House Election | Aug 30, 2009 | Fukui 3rd District | LDP | 80,724 | 50.79% | Won |
| 46th House Election | Dec 16, 2012 | Fukui 3rd District | LDP | 77,543 | 57.90% | Won |
| 47th House Election | Dec 14, 2014 | Fukui 2nd District | LDP | 83,086 | 61.52% | Won |
| 48th House Election | Oct 22, 2017 | Fukui 2nd District | LDP | 80,895 | 54.18% | Won |
| 49th House Election | Oct 31, 2021 | Fukui 2nd District | LDP | 81,705 | 53.86% | Won |
| 50th House Election | Oct 27, 2024 | Fukui 2nd District | Independent | 33,532 | 22.51% | Lost |
