= Wakasa, Fukui =

Wakasa 若狭町
- Town
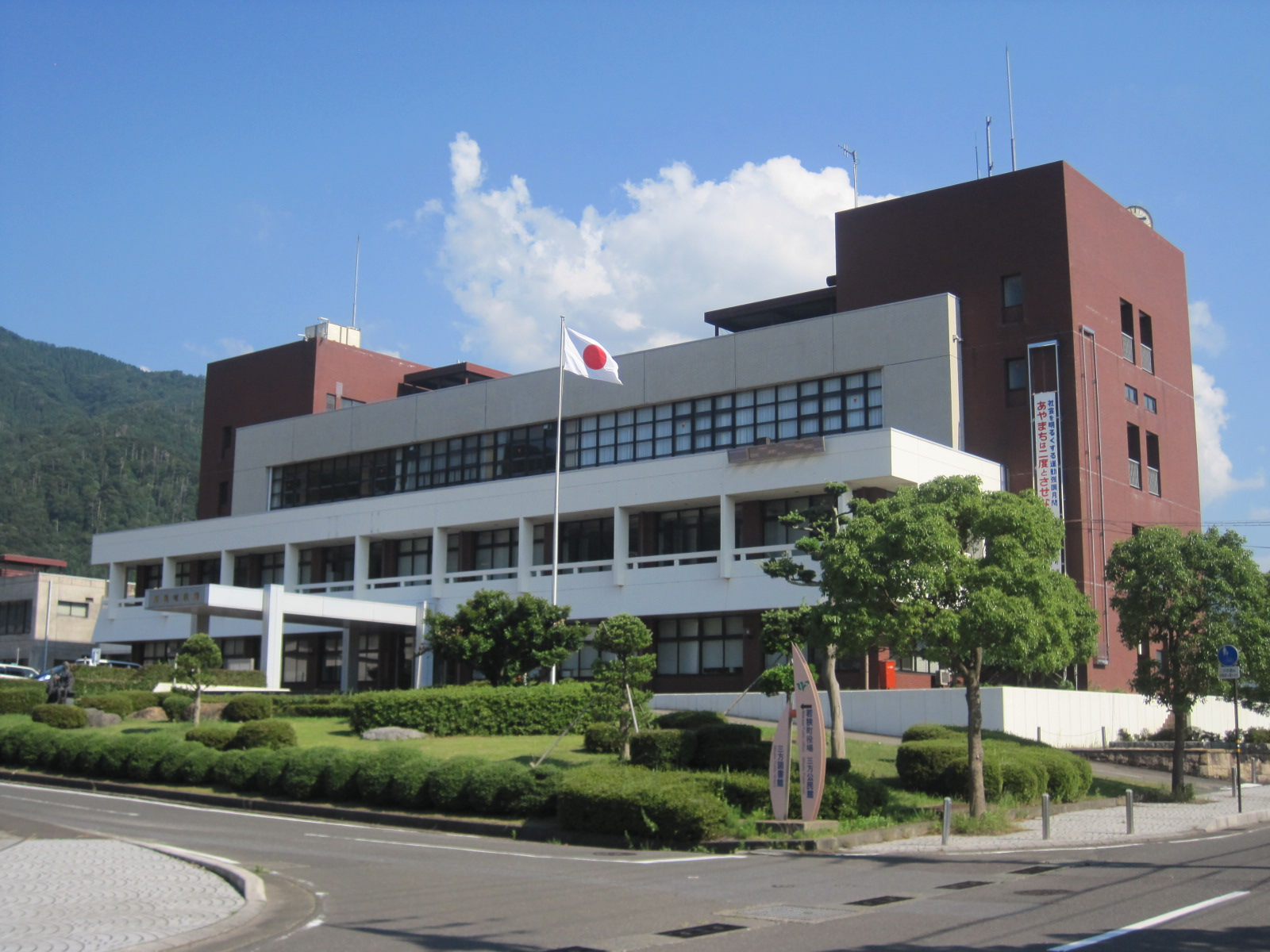
- Wakasa Town Hall

- Flag Seal

- Location of Wakasa in Fukui Prefecture
- Interactive map of Wakasa
- Coordinates: 35°32′56.2″N 135°54′29.4″E
- Country: Japan
- Region: Chūbu (Hokuriku)
- Prefecture: Fukui
- District: Mikatakaminaka

Area
  - Total: 178.49 km^{2} (68.92 sq mi)

Population (March 2026)
  - Total: 13,062
  - Density: 73.181/km^{2} (189.54/sq mi)
- Time zone: UTC+9 (Japan Standard Time)
- Phone number: 0770-45-1111
- Address: 1-1 Chuo, Wakasa-cho, Mikatakaminaka-gun, Fukui-ken 919-1393
- Website: www.town.fukui-wakasa.lg.jp
- Symbols

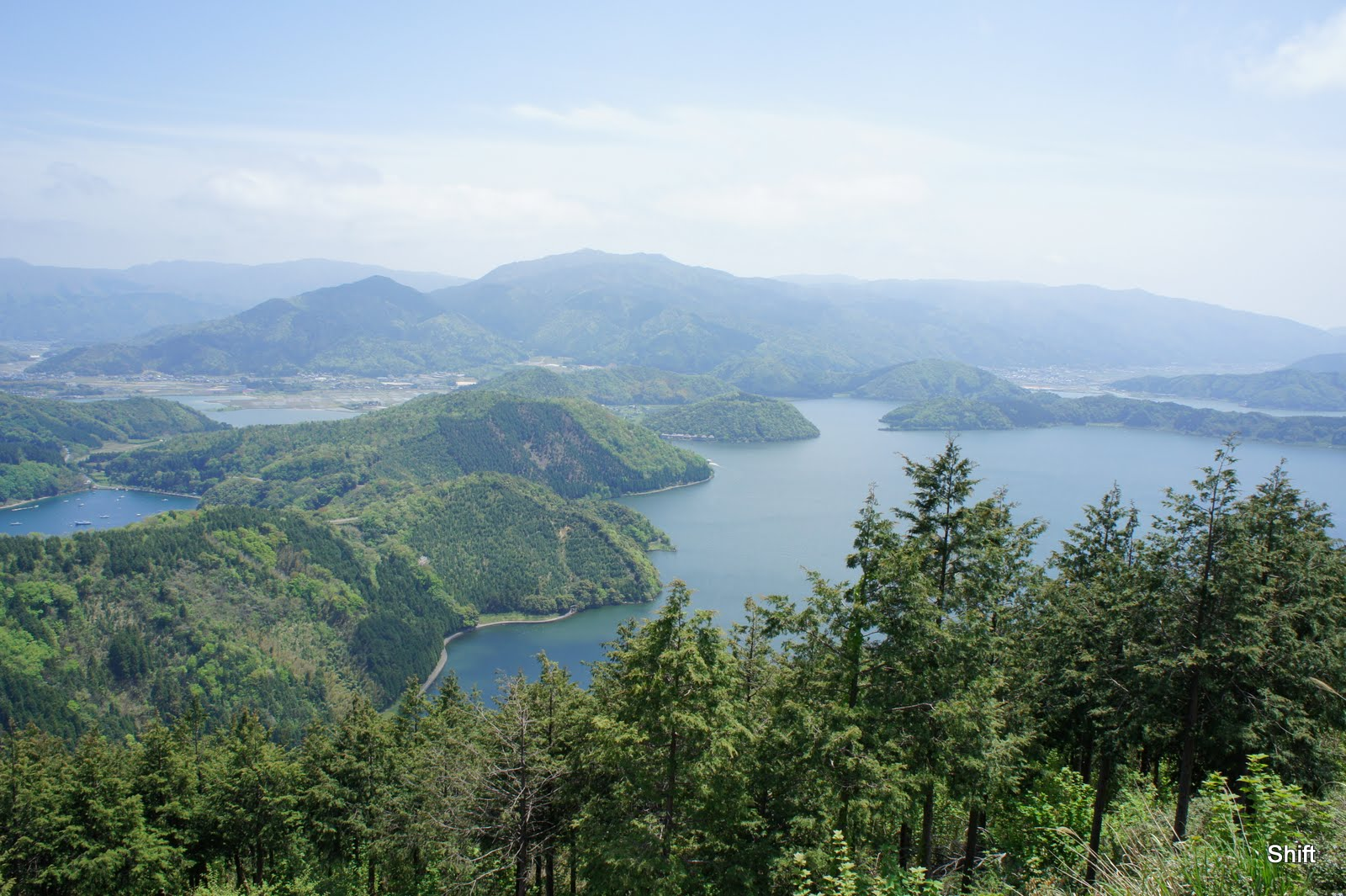
Mikata five lakes

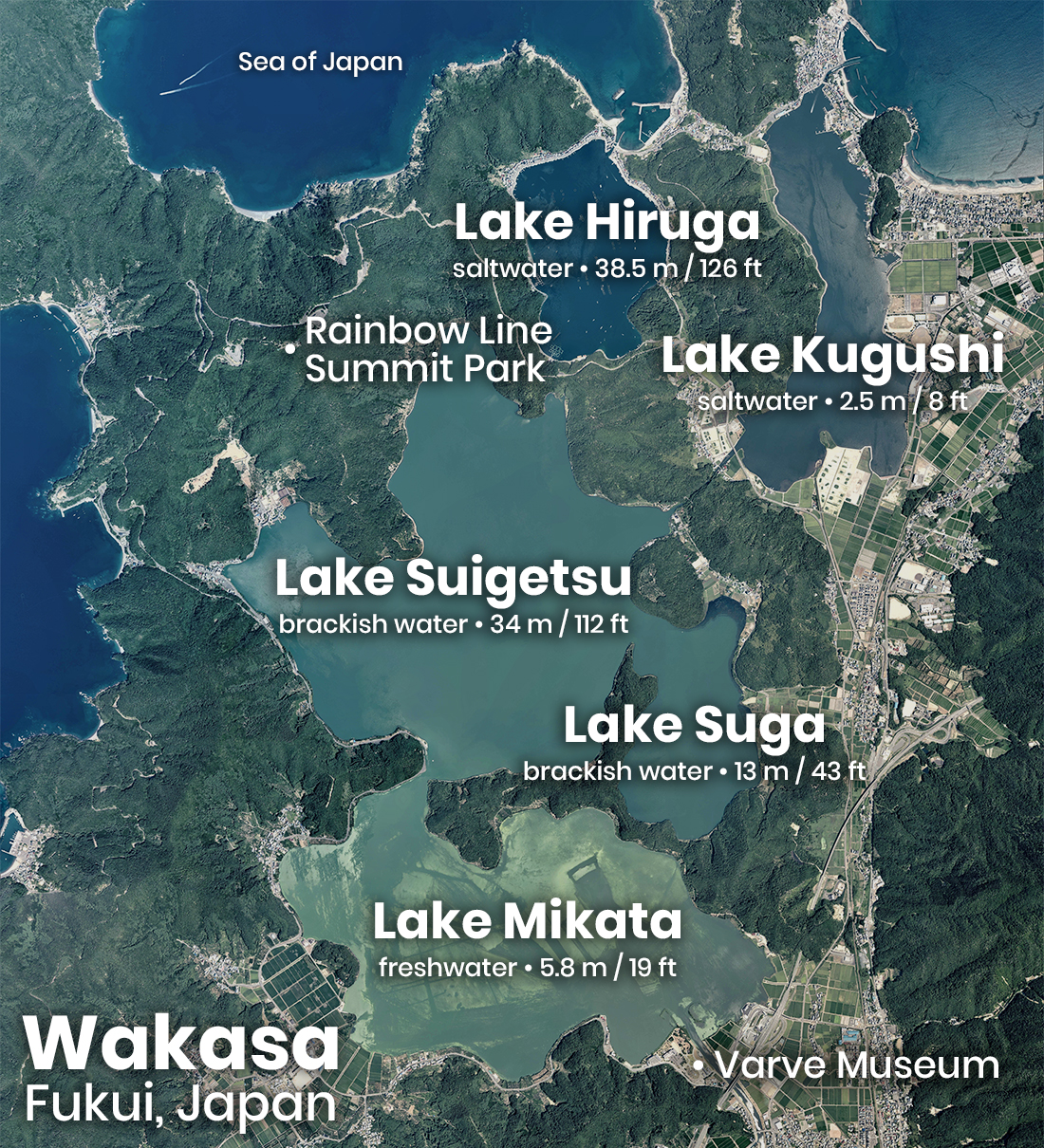
Annotated aerial view of the Mikata Five Lakes in Wakasa, Fukui Prefecture, Japan (2018/2023). Measurements refer to maximum depth.

Wakasa (若狭町, Wakasa-chō) is a town located in Fukui Prefecture, Japan. As of 1 March 2026, the town had an estimated population of 13,062 in 4912 households and a population density of 73 persons per km^{2}. The total area of the town was 178.49 square kilometres (68.92 sq mi).

== Geography ==
Wakasa is located in the western part of Fukui Prefecture, in the Reinan and Wakasa regions. The coast is part of the ria coast of Wakasa Bay of the Sea of Japan. To the south, along the border with Kosei, Shiga, there is a range of relatively low mountains around 800 meters high, and the Takashima Trail route allows for hiking and mountain climbing. On the border with Mihama, Fukui are the Mikata Five Lakes, a Ramsar Convention-registered wetland. It is also known as the area through which the Saba Kaido (Mackerel Road), which connected Wakasa Province and Kyoto, passed, and together with the neighboring city of Obama, it was designated as the first Japan Heritage site under the name "Wakasa Cultural Heritage Group Connecting the Sea and the Capital - Miketsukuni Wakasa and the Saba Kaido -". In addition, Kumagawa-juku along the road is a designated Important Preservation District for Groups of Traditional Buildings With Kurami Pass as the watershed, the Hasu River flows into the Mikata Five Lakes, and the Kitagawa River, which originates from Mount Sanjusanken, merges with the streams around Mizusaka Pass and the Tobagawa River, and plains open up in their basins.

Parts of the town are within the borders of the Wakasa Wan Quasi-National Park.

=== Neighbouring municipalities ===
Fukui Prefecture

- Mihama
- Obama

Shiga Prefecture

- Takashima

=== Climate ===
Wakasa has a humid subtropical climate (Cfa per the Köppen climate classification system) characterized by warm, wet summers and cold winters with heavy snowfall. The average annual temperature in Wakasa is 14.8 °C. The average annual rainfall is 2115 mm with September as the wettest month. The temperatures are highest on average in August, at around 27.2 °C, and lowest in January, at around 3.7 °C.

== Demographics ==
Per Japanese census data, the population of Wakasa has declined over the past 40 years.

Historical population
Year	Pop.	±%
1970	18,090	—
1980	18,114	+0.1%
1990	17,835	−1.5%
2000	17,313	−2.9%
2010	16,099	−7.0%
2020	14,003	−13.0%

== History ==
Wakasa is part of ancient Wakasa Province. During the Edo period, the area was part of the holdings of Obama Domain. Following the Meiji restoration, it was organised into part of Mikatakaminaka District in Fukui Prefecture. The town of Wakasa was formed on March 31, 2005, by the merger of the former towns of Mikata, from Mikata District, and Kaminaka, from Onyū District.

== Government ==
Wakasa has a mayor-council form of government with a directly elected mayor and a unicameral town legislature of 14 members. Wakasa, collectively with Obama and Mihama contributes two members to the Fukui Prefectural Assembly. In terms of national politics, the town is part of the Fukui 2nd district of the lower house of the Diet of Japan.

== Economy ==
The economy of Wakasa is dependent on commercial fishing, agriculture and seasonal tourism.

== Education ==
Wakasa has nine public elementary schools and one public middle schools operated by the town government. The town has one public high school operated by the Fukui Prefectural Board of Education.

== Transportation ==
=== Railway ===
- JR West - Obama Line
  - Kiyama, Mikata, Fujii, Tomura, Ōtoba, Wakasa-Arita, Kaminaka

=== Highway ===
- Maizuru-Wakasa Expressway
- National Route 27
- National Route 162
- National Route 203

== Notable people ==
- Tsutomu Sakuma (1879–1910), was a career naval officer in the Imperial Japanese Navy and a pioneer submarine commander

== Local attractions ==
- Kumakawa-juku, one of the nationally protected Groups of Traditional Buildings
- Mikata Five Lakes
- Torihama shell mound
- Wakasa Mikata Jomon Museum
- Shimofunazuka Kofun, Kamifunazuka Kofun, Nakatsuka Kofun, Nishizuka Kofun, Jōnozuka Kofun, National Historic Sites
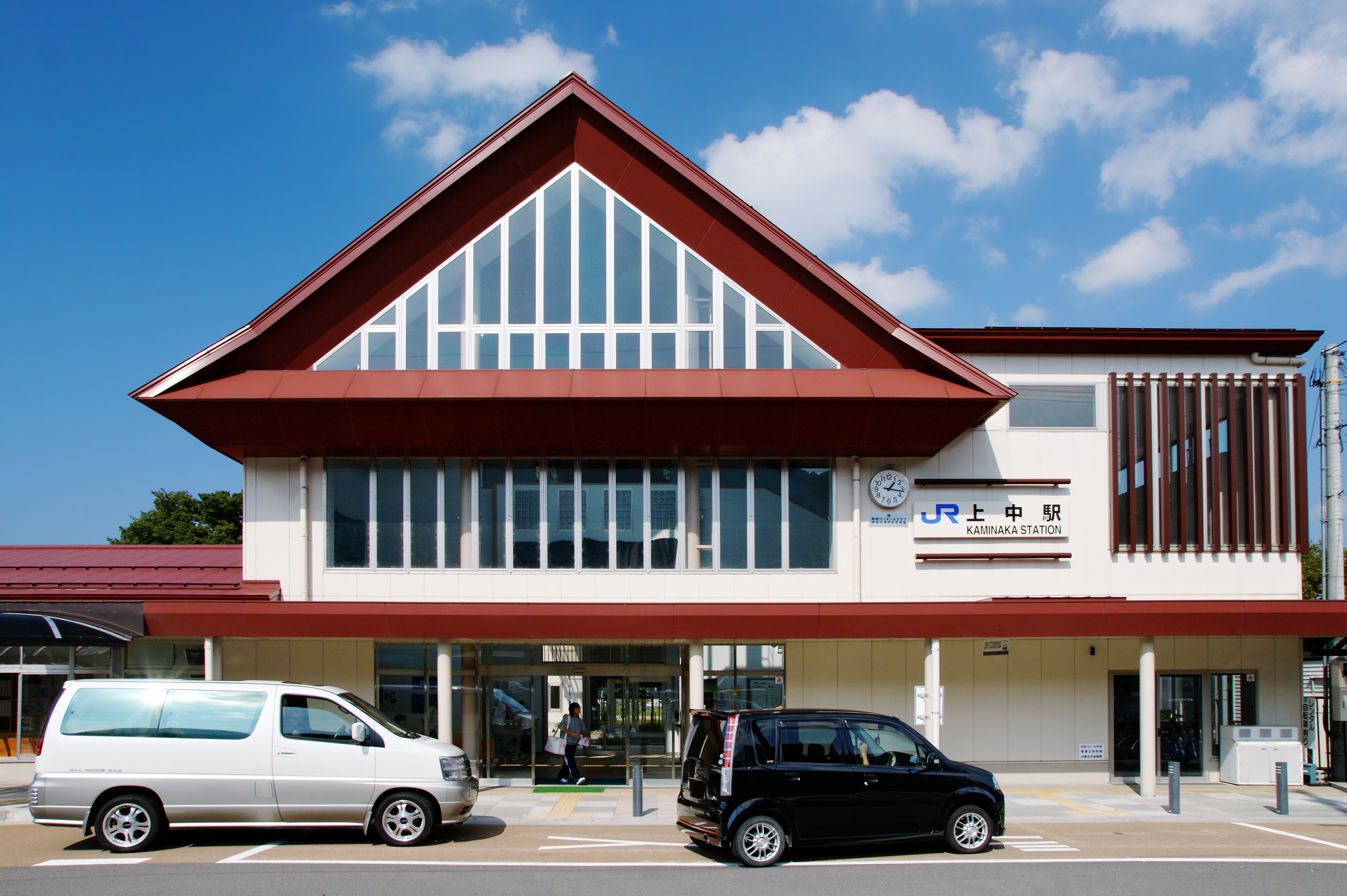
Kaminaka Station

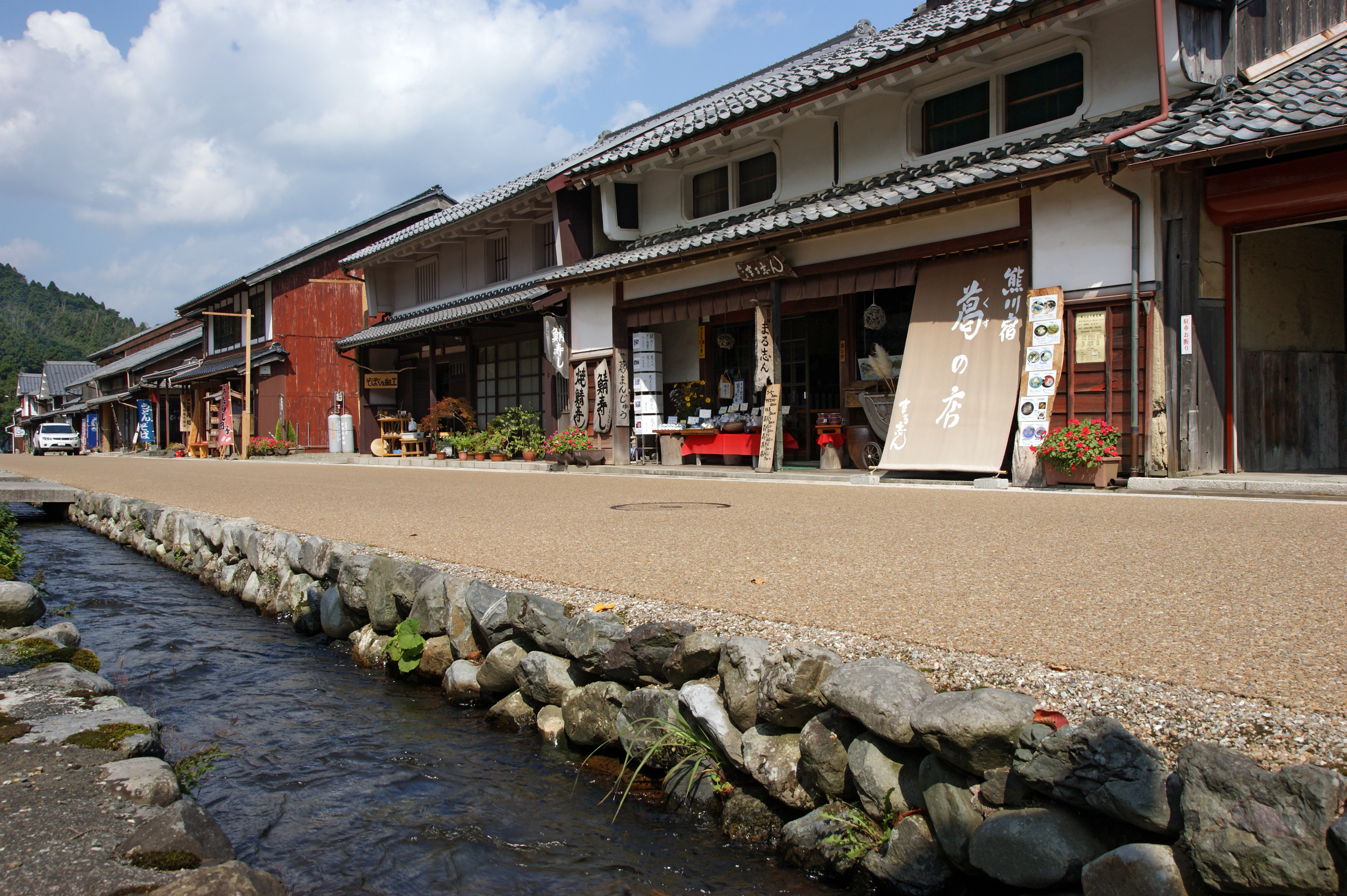
Kuamgawa-juku

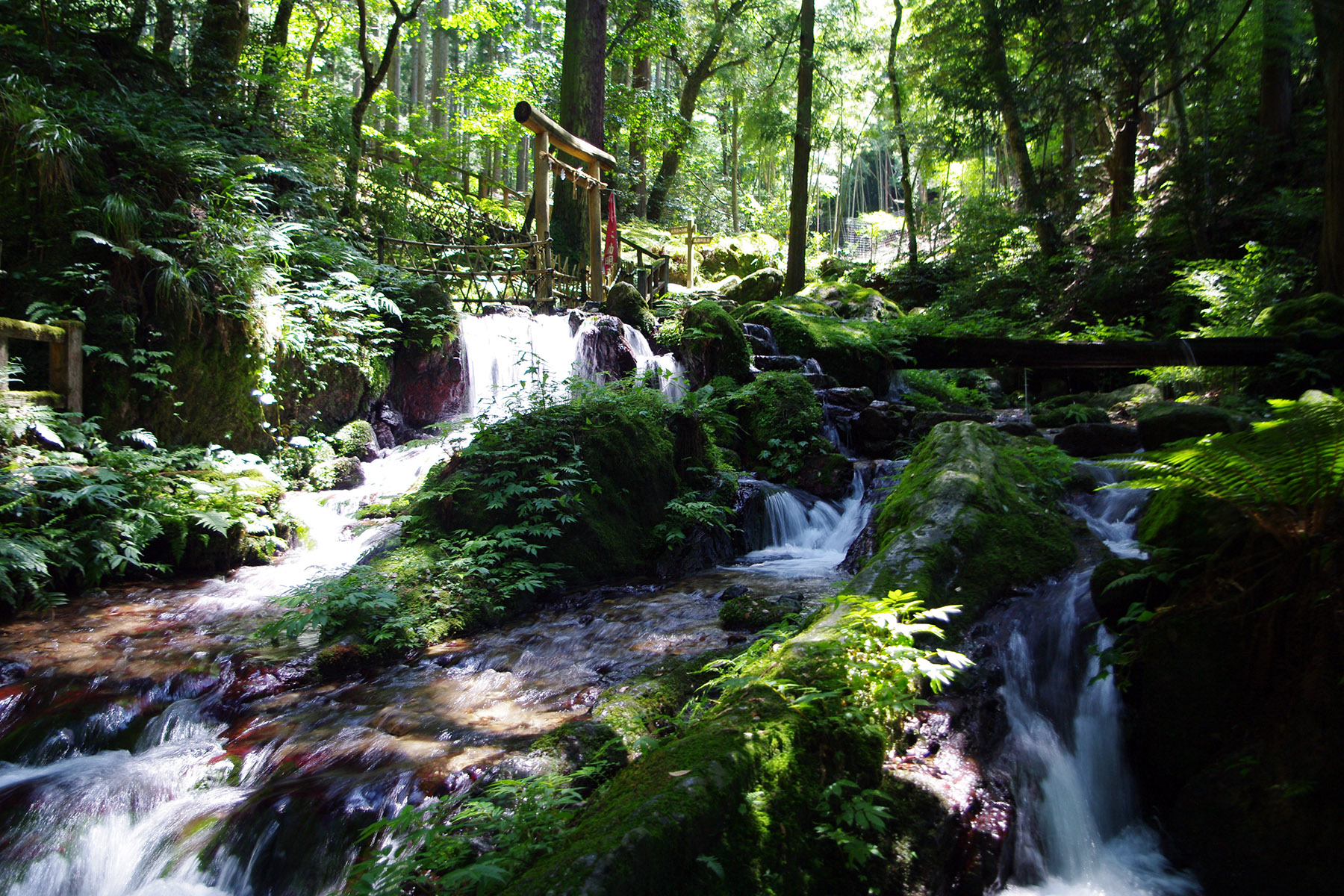
Uriwari Falls

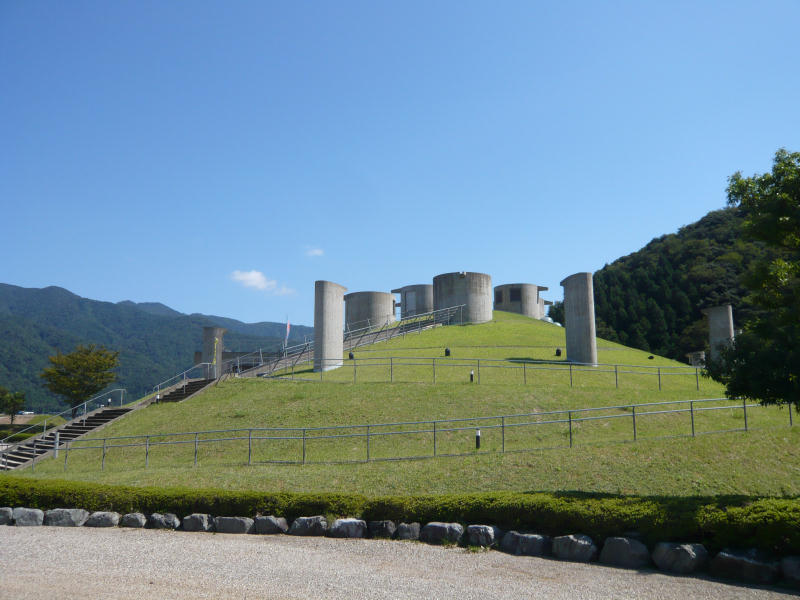
Wakasa Mikata Jomon Museum
