= Kamifunazuka Kofun =

Kofun burial mound in Japan

- 上船塚古墳 (Japanese)
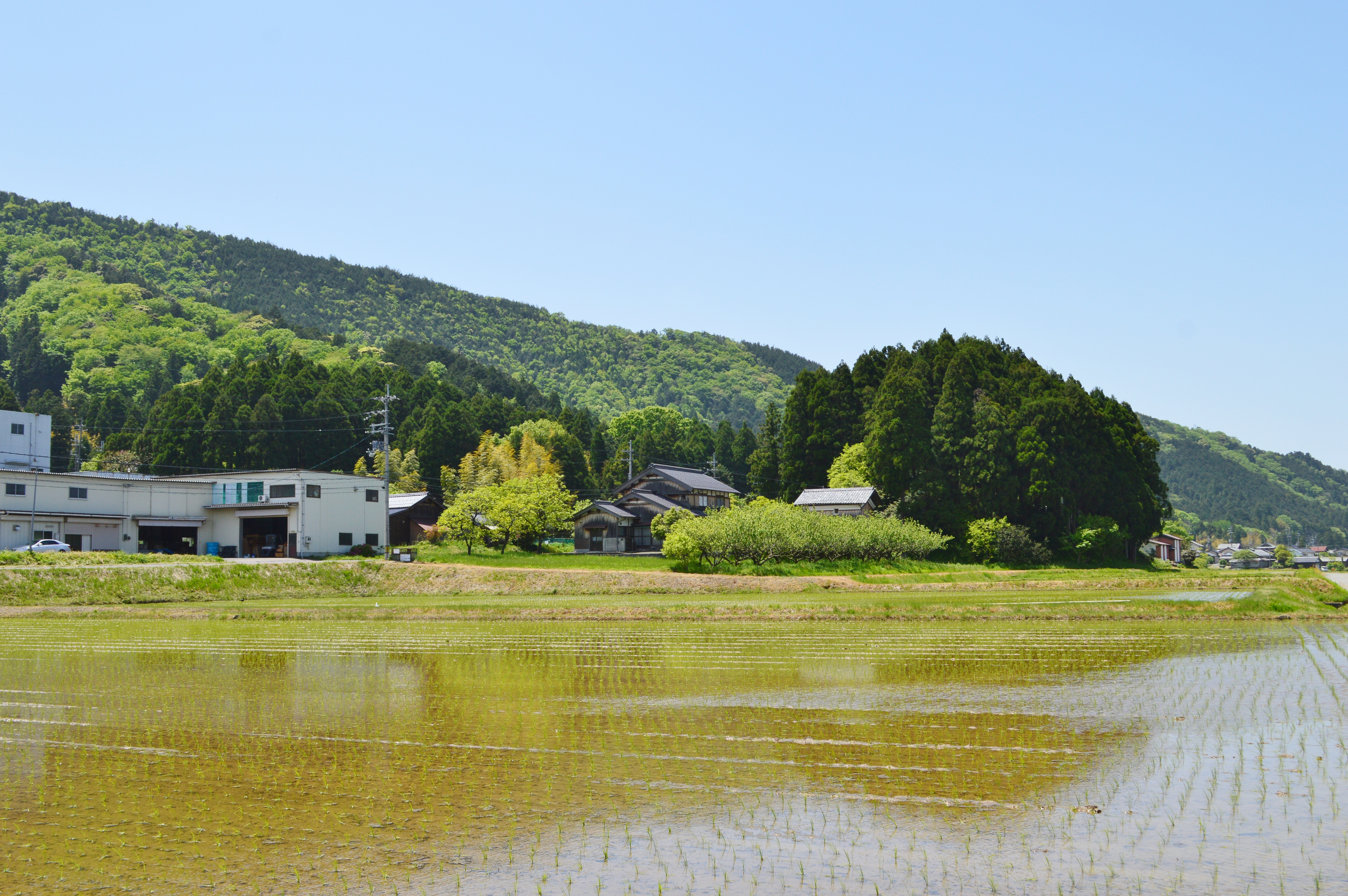
- Kamifunazuka Kofun to the left; Shimofunazuka Kofun to the right

- Kamifunazuka Kofun Kamifunazuka Kofun (Japan)
- 35°28′12.79″N 135°48′50.81″E
- Type: kofun
- Periods: Kofun period
- Location: Wakasa, Fukui, Japan
- Region: Hokuriku region

History
- Built: early 6th century AD

Site notes
- Public access: Yes (no facilities)

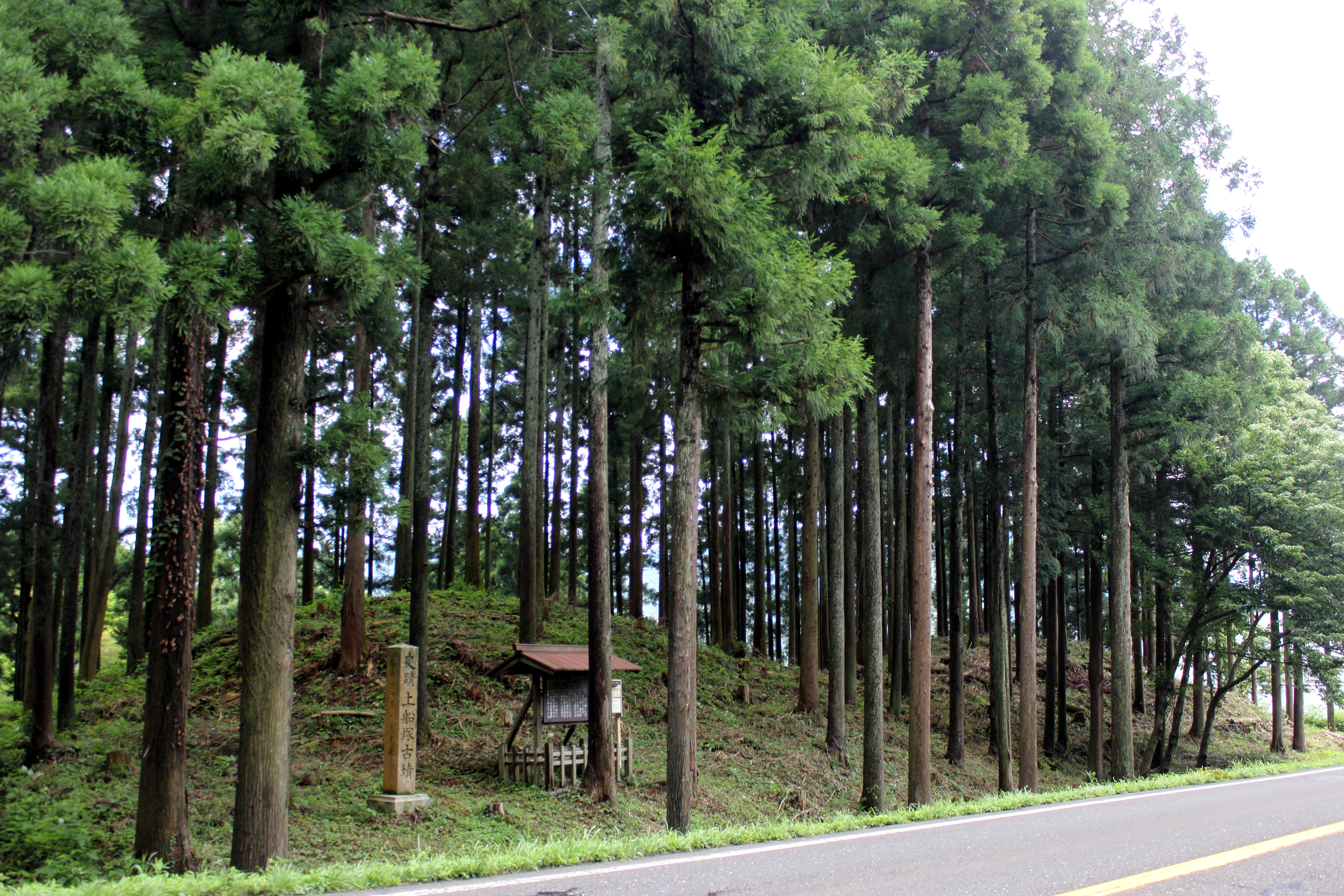
Kamifunazuka Kofun

The Kamifunazuka Kofun (上船塚古墳) is a kofun burial mound located in what is now part of the town of Wakasa, Fukui in the Hokuriku region of Japan. The tumulus was designated a National Historic Site of Japan in 1935.

== Overview ==
The Kamifunazuka Kofun is one of a group of kofun located in the Hirano neighbourhood of central Wakasa town, forming the Jōnozuka Kofun Cluster. It is sandwiched between Japan National Route 27 and the tracks of the JR West Obama Line railway. The tumulus is a zenpō-kōen-fun (前方後円墳), which is shaped like a keyhole, having one square end and one circular end, when viewed from above. It is oriented almost in an east-west direction with the posterior circular portion facing east and is separated from the Shimofunazuka Kofun by the path of the ancient Wakasa Kaidō, an ancient highway which connected this region with Yamato.The total length of the tumulus is 70 meters, with the circular portion having a diameter of 36 meters and height of 16 meters. The "neck" of the structure has a width of 20 meters, widening out towards the west, where the anterior rectangular portion has a width of 50 meters. The height of the tumulus is 16 meters. The entire structure is similar to that of the nearby Nishizuka Kofun. The Kamifunazuka Kofun was once covered with fukiishi, of which a portion remain, and the fragments of cylindrical haniwa have been found in the area. The kofun is also surrounded by a dry moat.

The Kamifunazuka Kofun is believed to date from the early 6th century AD, or late in the Kofun period, but this tumulus has yet to be excavated by archaeologists. It may have been the grave of a local king before imperial dynasty control over the area of Wakasa was firmly established. Per local legend, this tumulus is said to be the grave of one of the Kuni no miyatsuko of Wakasa Province.

The tumulus is about a 13-minute walk from Shin-Hirano Station on the JR West Obama Line.

Jōnozuka Kofun Cluster
Name	Type	Length	date
Jōnozuka Kofun	keyhole	100m	early 5th century
Shiroyama Kofun	keyhole	63m	mid 5th century
Nishizuka Kofun	keyhole	74m	end 5th century
Nakatsuka Kofun	keyhole	72m	late 5th century
Jūsen-no-mori Kofun	keyhole	68m	early 6th century
Kamifunazuka Kofun	keyhole	70m	early 6th century
Shimofunazuka Kofun	keyhole	85m	mid 6th century

== See also ==
- List of Historic Sites of Japan (Fukui)
- Shimofunazuka Kofun
