= Fusa Tomita =

Japanese politician (1893–1954)

- 冨田 ふさ

Member of the House of Representatives
- In office 10 April 1946 – 31 March 1947
- Preceded by: Constituency established
- Succeeded by: Multi-member district
- Constituency: Kyoto at-large

Personal details
- Born: 10 October 1893 Matsuoka, Fukui, Japan
- Died: 19 July 1954 (aged 60)
- Party: Democratic
- Other political affiliations: Liberal (1946–1947)
- Education: Tokyo Women's Medical School

Fusa Tomita (Japanese: 冨田ふさ; 10 October 1893 – 19 July 1954) was a Japanese physician and politician. She was one of the first group of women elected to the House of Representatives in 1946.

== Biography ==
Tomita was born in Matsuoka in 1893. She attended Tokyo Women's Medical College and became an obstetrician and gynecologist. She worked at Kyoto Imperial University Hospital and later became president of Tomita Hospital, as well as director of the Kyoto Philanthropic Society. She also ran a geisha house. During World War II she was involved in the Patriotic Women's Association.

After the war, Tomita joined the Liberal Party and was a candidate for the party in Kyoto in the 1946 general elections, the first in which women could vote. Running on the slogan "What's wrong with geishas?", she was elected to the House of Representatives. After the election she was charged with door-to-door canvassing during the election campaign and was fined 500 yen. She attempted to run as a Democratic Party candidate in the 1947 elections, but was rejected.

She died in 1954.
