= Yoshida District, Fukui =

District in Fukui prefecture, Japan

Coordinates: 36.0791°N 136.357°E

Yoshida (吉田郡, Yoshida-gun) is a district located in Fukui Prefecture, Japan.

As of October 1, 2005, the district has an estimated population of 20,766 with a density of 220.12 persons per km^{2}. The total area is 94.34 km^{2}.

== Municipalities ==
The district consists of one town:

- Eiheiji (Note: Classified as a town.)

== History ==
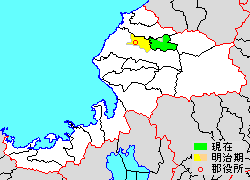
Map showing original extent of Yoshida District in Fukui Prefecture: * yellow - areas formerly within the district borders during the early Meiji period: 1. Eiheiji-machi

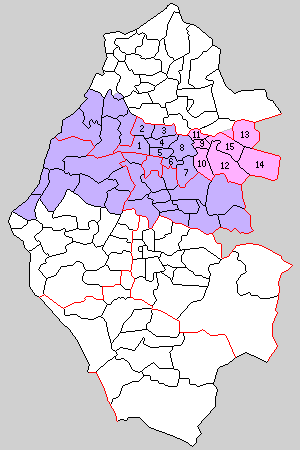
Colored areas are in this district.

=== Recent mergers ===
- On February 13, 2006 - The town of Matsuoka and the village of Kamishihi were merged into the expanded town of Eiheiji.
