= Imajō, Fukui =

Dissolved municipality in Nanjō district, Fukui prefecture, Japan (1955–2005)

Imajō (今庄町, Imajō-chō) was a town located in Nanjō District, Fukui Prefecture, Japan.

As of 2003, the town had an estimated population of 4,846 and a density of 20.08 persons per km^{2}. The total area was 241.30 km^{2}.

On January 1, 2005, Imajō, along with the town of Nanjō, and the village of Kōno (all from Nanjō District), was merged to create the town of Minamiechizen. As of this merger, the town of Nanjō no longer exists as an independent municipality.

== Education ==
Imajō has a number of kindergartens, one Elementary School and Junior High School. Imajō Jr. High School consists of about 150 students and 20 faculty.
