= Natashō, Fukui =

Dissolved municipality in Fukui prefecture, Japan

Natashō (名田庄村, Natashō-mura) was a village located in Onyū District, Fukui Prefecture, Japan.

As of 2003, the village had an estimated population of 2,818 and a density of 19.59 persons per km^{2}. The total area was 143.83 km^{2}.

On March 3, 2006, Natashō was merged into the expanded town of Ōi (in Ōi District).
