= Kaminaka, Fukui =

Dissolved municipality in Fukui prefecture, Japan

Kaminaka (上中町, Kaminaka-chō) was a town located in Onyū District, Fukui Prefecture, Japan.

As of 2003, the town had an estimated population of 8,270 and a density of 100.76 persons per km^{2}. The total area was 82.08 km^{2}.

On March 31, 2005, Kaminaka, along with the town of Mikata (from Mikata District), was merged to create the town of Wakasa (in the newly created Mikatakaminaka District).
