= Mikata, Fukui =

Dissolved municipality in Fukui prefecture, Japan

Mikata (三方町, Mikata-chō) was a town located in Mikata District, Fukui Prefecture, Japan.

As of 2003, the town had an estimated population of 9,026 and a density of 93.47 persons per km^{2}. The total area was 96.57 km^{2}.

On March 31, 2005, Mikata, along with the town of Kaminaka (from Onyū District), was merged to create the town of Wakasa (in the newly created Mikatakaminaka District).
