= Kōno, Fukui =

Dissolved municipality in Fukui prefecture, Japan

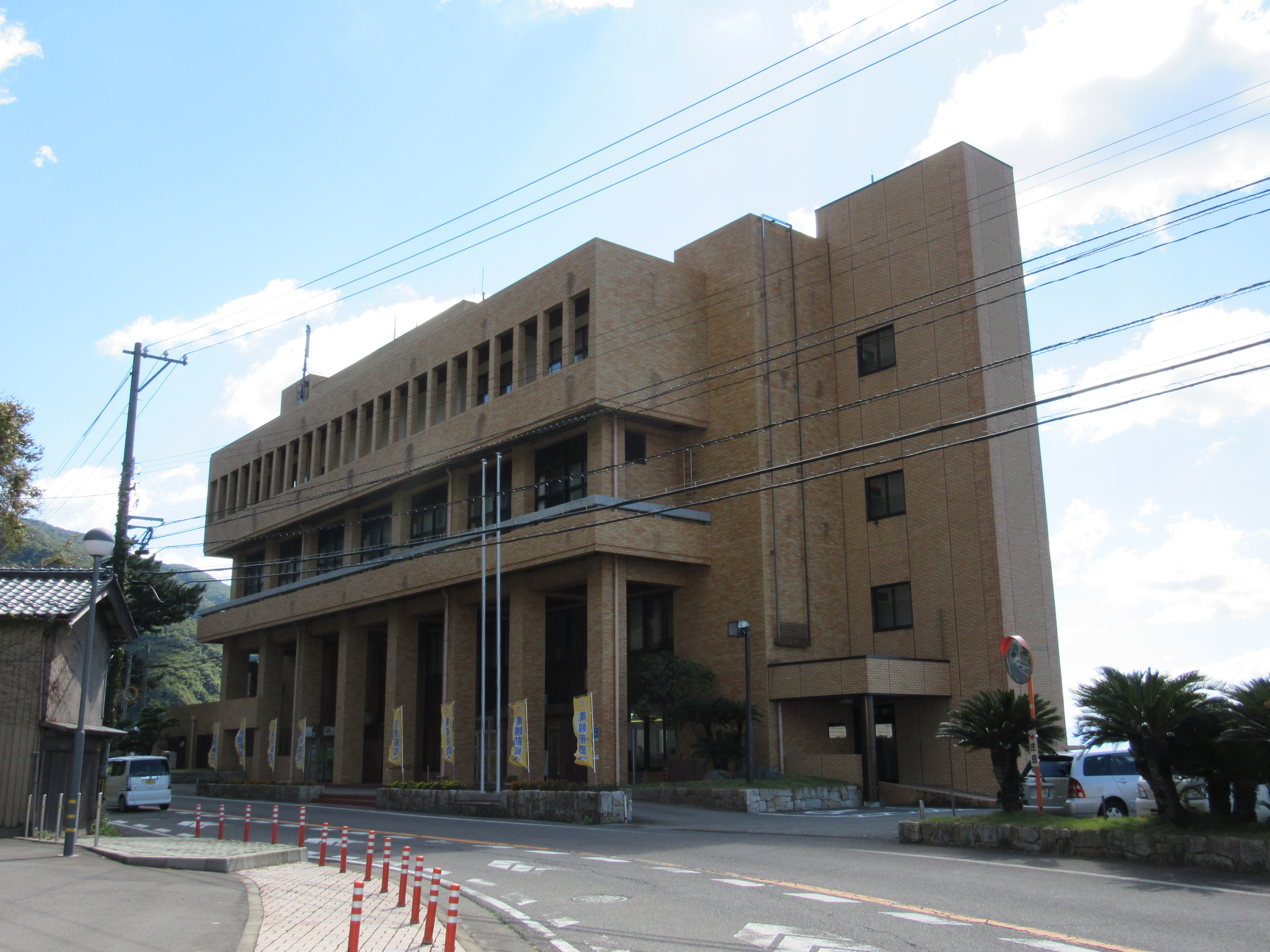
former Kōno Village Hall

Kōno (河野村, Kōno-mura) was a village located in Nanjō District, Fukui Prefecture, Japan.

As of 2003, the village had an estimated population of 2,114 and a density of 42.72 persons per km^{2}. The total area was 49.48 km^{2}.

On January 1, 2005, Kōno, along with the towns of Imajō and Nanjō (all from Nanjō District), was merged to create the town of Minamiechizen. As of this merger, the town of Nanjō no longer exists as an independent municipality.
