= Nanjō, Fukui =

Dissolved municipality in Fukui prefecture, Japan

Nanjō (南条町, Nanjō-chō) was a town located in Nanjō District, Fukui Prefecture, Japan.

As of 2003, the town had an estimated population of 5,819 and a density of 109.67 persons per km^{2}. The total area was 53.06 km^{2}.

On January 1, 2005, Nanjō, along with the town of Imajō, and the village of Kōno (all from Nanjō District), was merged to create the town of Minamiechizen. As of this merger, the town of Nanjō no longer exists as an independent municipality.

== People ==
Nanjō is a rural town consisting of small villages spread out over the Nanjō area. Each village has unique qualities and you will find that many people from the same village share the same surname. The people tend to be shy to foreigners but are friendly if they are spoken to or greeted in Japanese.

== Nanjō Football Club ==
Nanjō F.C. is one of the oldest sporting establishments in the town. The club has been running for over 30 years and was established by Don Inoue. The club consists of underage teams and two adult teams. Nanjō FC play in the Fukui Prefectural 1st Division and are generally made up of towns people from the ages of 18 to 30. They have had great success in the Fukui Prefectural league but in recent years have been struggling with under strength teams. Nanjō Hastericks are the second adult team in the village and consist of former Nanjō FC players over 30 years old. They have been playing in the Fukui Prefectural 2nd Division over the last 7 years which is a great credit since the other teams in the division are made up of much younger players.
