= Kamishihi, Fukui =

Dissolved municipality in Fukui prefecture, Japan

Kamishihi (上志比村, Kamishihi-mura) was a village located in Yoshida District, Fukui Prefecture, Japan.

As of 2003, the village had an estimated population of 3,492 and a density of 137.75 persons per km^{2}. The total area was 25.35 km^{2}.

On February 13, 2006, Kamishihi, along with the town of Matsuoka (also from Yoshida District), was merged into the expanded town of Eiheiji.
