= Onyū District, Fukui =

District in Japan

Onyū (遠敷郡, Onyū-gun) was a district located in the Wakasa Region of Fukui Prefecture, Japan until 2005.

The time before the dissolution, the district had an area of 143.83 km^{2} with an estimated population of 2,747 with an area of 1,088 and a density of 49.08 persons per km^{2}. The total area is 225.91 km^{2}.

== Municipalities ==
Prior to its dissolution, the district consisted of only one village:

- Natashō (Note: Classified as a village.)

== History ==
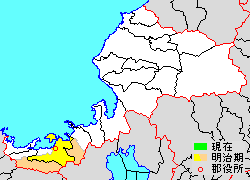
Map showing original extent of Onyū District in Fukui Prefecture: * yellow - areas formerly within the district borders during the early Meiji period

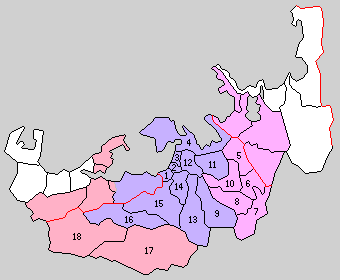
Colored areas are in this district.

=== Recent mergers ===
- On March 31, 2005 - The town of Kaminaka was merged with the town of Mikata (from Mikata District) to create the town of Wakasa (now in Mikatakaminaka District). (1 village)
- On March 3, 2006 - The village of Natashō was merged into the expanded town of Ōi (in Ōi District). Onyū District was dissolved as a result of this merger.

== See also ==
- List of dissolved districts of Japan
