= Matsuoka, Fukui =

Dissolved municipality in Fukui prefecture, Japan

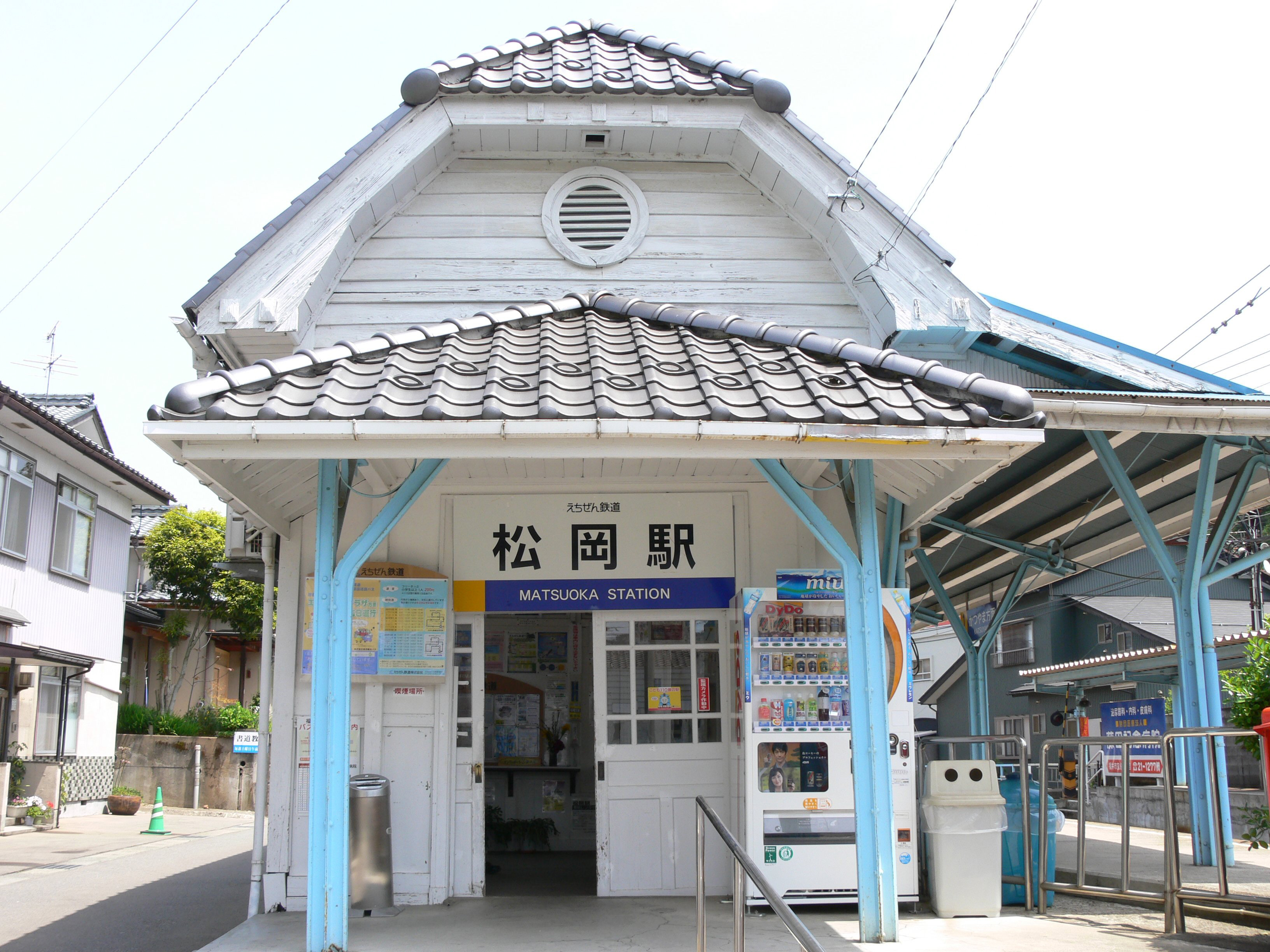
Matsuoka Station in the town of Eheiji, Japan

Matsuoka (松岡町, Matsuoka-chō) was a town located in Yoshida District, Fukui Prefecture, Japan.

As of 2003, the town had an estimated population of 11,071 and a density of 595.54 persons per km^{2}. The total area was 18.59 km^{2}.

On February 13, 2006, Matsuoka, along with the village of Kamishihi (also from Yoshida District), was merged into the expanded town of Eiheiji.

The area is still identified by the Matsuoka Station of the Echizen Railway Katsuyama Eiheiji Line.
