= Kaminaka Station =

Railway station in Wakasa, Fukui Prefecture, Japan

Kaminaka Station 上中駅
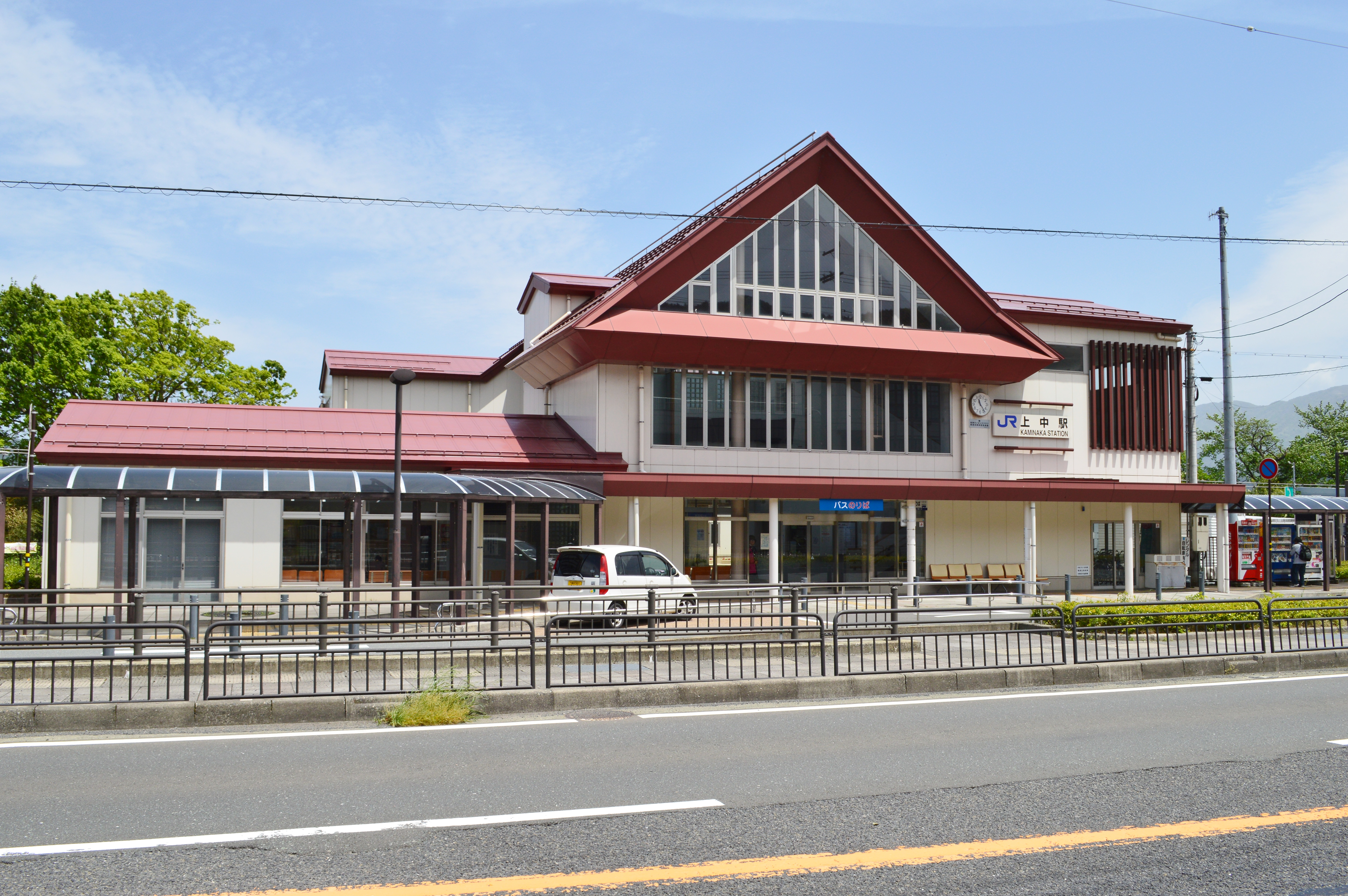
- The station frontage in May 2017

General information
- Location: 36-1 Inokuchi, Wakasa-cho, Mikatakaminaka-gun, Fukui-ken 919-1542; Japan
- Coordinates: 35.4636°N 135.8556°E
- Operator: JR West
- Line: ■ Obama Line
- Distance: 38.8 km from Tsuruga
- Platforms: 2 side platforms
- Tracks: 2

Other information
- Status: Staffed (Midori no Madoguchi)
- Website: Official website

History
- Opened: 10 November 1918; 107 years ago
- Former names: Miyake (until April 1956)

Passengers
- FY 2023: 438 daily
Location
- Location within Japan

Kaminaka Station (上中駅, Kaminaka-eki) is a railway station on the Obama Line in the town of Wakasa, Mikatakaminaka District, Fukui Prefecture, Japan, operated by West Japan Railway Company (JR West).

== Lines ==
Kaminaka Station is served by the Obama Line, and is located 38.8 km from Tsuruga.

== Station layout ==
The station consists of two opposed side platforms. The station has a Midori no Madoguchi staffed ticket office.

== Adjacent stations ==
«	Service	»
Obama Line
Tomura	Rapid	Higashi-Obama
Wakasa-Arita	Local	Shin-Hirano

== History ==
The station opened on 10 November 1918 as Miyake Station (三宅駅). It was renamed Kaminaka Station on 10 April 1956. With the privatization of Japanese National Railways (JNR) on 1 April 1987, the station came under the control of JR West.

== Passenger statistics ==
In fiscal 2016, the station was used by an average of 268 passengers daily (boarding passengers only).

== Surrounding area ==
- National Route 27
- former Kaminaka town hall

== See also ==
- List of railway stations in Japan
