= Mikata District, Fukui =

District in Fukui prefecture, Japan

Coordinates: 35.596°N 135.978°E

Mikata (三方郡, Mikata-gun) is a district located in Fukui Prefecture, Japan.

As of October 1, 2005, the district has an estimated population of 11,023 with a density of 72.37 persons per km^{2}. The total area is 152.32 km^{2}.

== Municipalities ==
The district consists of one town:

- Mihama (Note: Classified as a town.)

== History ==
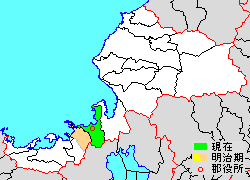
Map showing original extent of Mikata District in Fukui Prefecture: * yellow - areas formerly within the district borders during the early Meiji period: 1. Mihama-machi

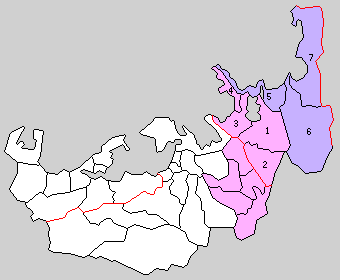
Colored areas are in this district.

=== Recent mergers ===
- On March 31, 2005 - The town of Mikata merged with the town of Kaminaka (from Onyū District), forming the new town of Wakasa (in the newly created Mikatakaminaka District).
