= Nanjō District, Fukui =

District in Fukui Prefecture, Japan

Coordinates: 35°46′37″N 136°13′34″E

Nanjō (南条郡, Nanjō-gun) is a district located in Fukui, Japan.

As of October 1, 2005, the district has an estimated population of 12,273 with a density of 35.69 persons per km^{2}. The total area is 343.84 km^{2}.

== Municipalities ==
The district consists of one town:

- Minamiechizen (Note: Classified as a town.)

== History ==
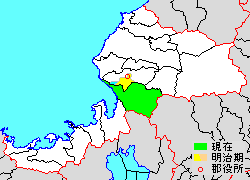
Map showing original extent of Nanjō District in Fukui Prefecture: * yellow - areas formerly within the district borders during the early Meiji period: 1. Minamiechizen-machi

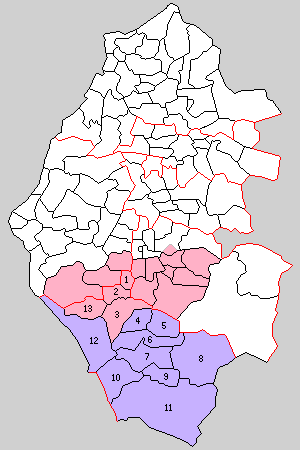
Colored areas are in this district.

=== Recent mergers ===
- On January 1, 2005 - The towns of Imajō and Nanjō, and the village of Kōno were merged to form the town of Minamiechizen.
