= Shimofunazuka Kofun =

Kofun burial mound in Japan

- 下船塚古墳 (Japanese)
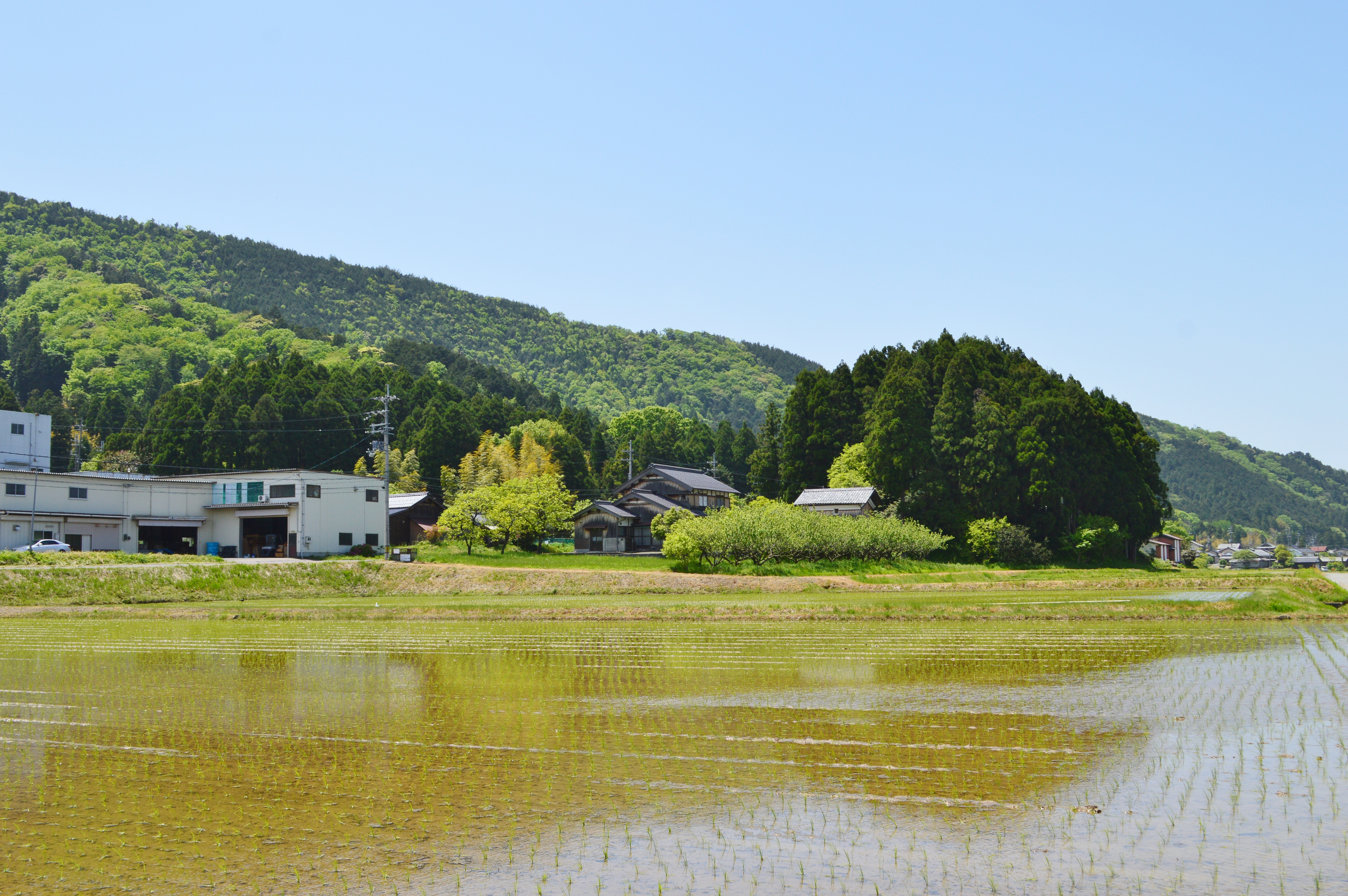
- Kamifunazuka Kofun to the left; Shimofunazuka Kofun to the right

- Shimofunazuka Kofun Shimofunazuka Kofun (Japan)
- 35°28′16.10″N 135°48′51.5″E
- Type: kofun
- Periods: Kofun period
- Location: Wakasa, Fukui, Japan
- Region: Hokuriku region

History
- Built: 6th century AD

Site notes
- Public access: Yes (no facilities)

The Shimofunazuka Kofun (下船塚古墳) is a kofun burial mound located in the Hikasa neighborhood of the town of Wakasa, Fukui in the Hokuriku region of Japan. It was designated a National Historic Site of Japan in 1935. It is also called the "Meotozuka" as it is paired with the Kamifunazuka Kofun, which has a separate National Historic Site designation.

== Overview ==
The Shimofunazuka Kofun is one of the Hikasa Kofun Cluster, which is in turn part of the larger Kaminaka Kofun Cluster of ancient tumuli. It sandwiched between Japan National Route 27 and the tracks of the JR West Obama Line railway on the left bank of the Kitagawa River.

This tumulus is two-step keyhole-shaped kofun zenpō-kōen-fun (前方後円墳), which is shaped like a keyhole, having one square end and one circular end, when viewed from above. It is oriented almost in an east-to-west direction with the posterior circular portion facing east. It is separated by the Kamifunazuka Kofun by the path of the ancient Wakasa Kaidō, an ancient highway which connected the region with Yamato. The total length of the tumulus is 85 meters, with the circular portion having a diameter of 47 meters. The posterior rectangular portion of the structure widens out towards the west, where it has a width of 47 meters. The height of the tumulus is 10 meters. The entire structure differs from that of the nearby Kamifunazuka Kofun in that fukiishi have not been found, although fragments of haniwa have been found in the area. The tumulus is also surrounded by a dry shield-shaped moat. A preliminary excavation was conducted in 1990. The tumulus appears to have been robbed in antiquity, and the structure of the burial chamber is not clear.

This tumulus was constructed in the middle of the 6th century. It may have been the grave a local king before imperial dynasty control over the area of Wakasa was firmly established. It is located about a 13-minute walk from Shin-Hirano Station on the JR West Obama Line.

== Gallery ==
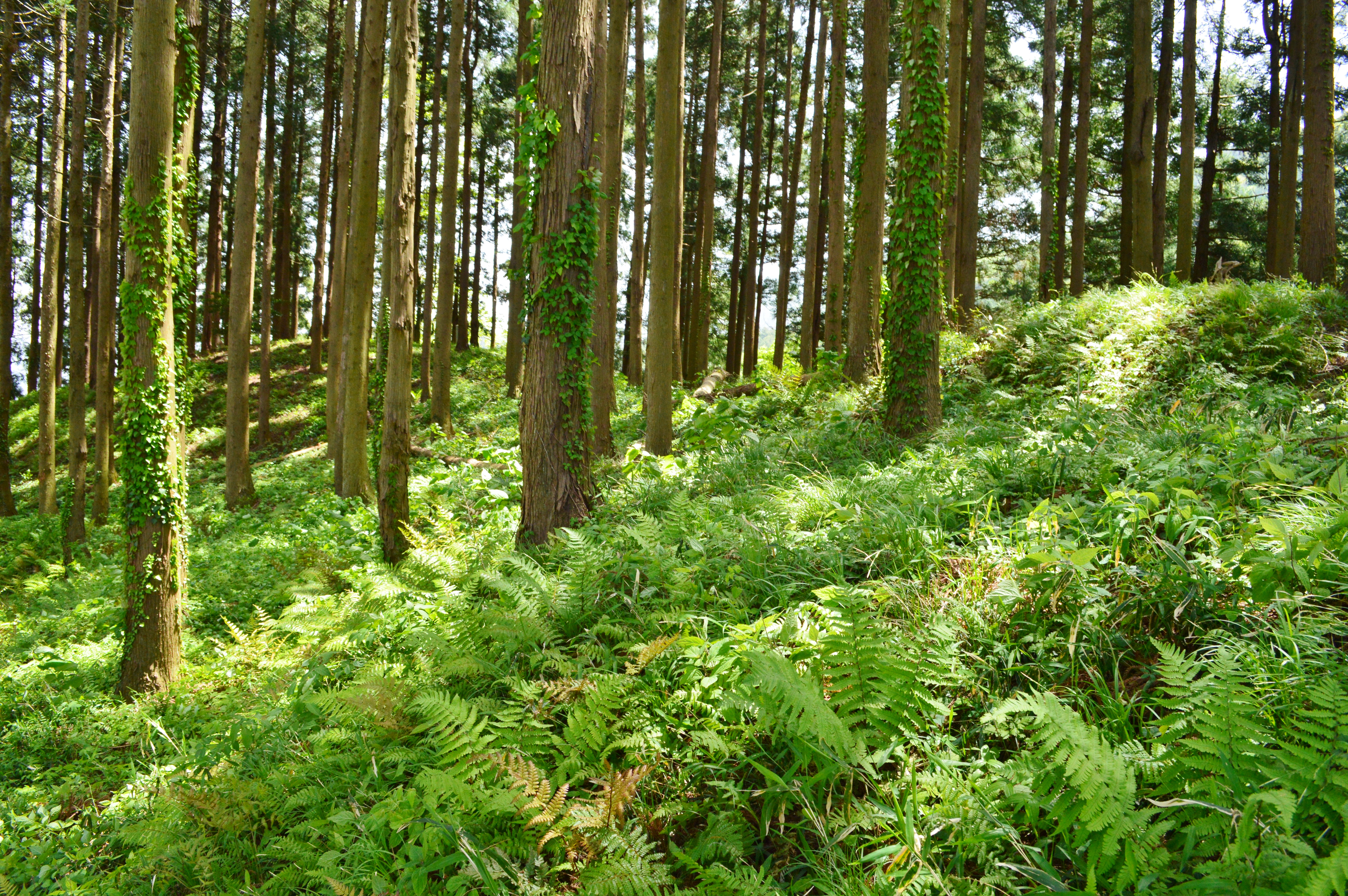
tumulus(rectangular portion to right, circular portion to left)

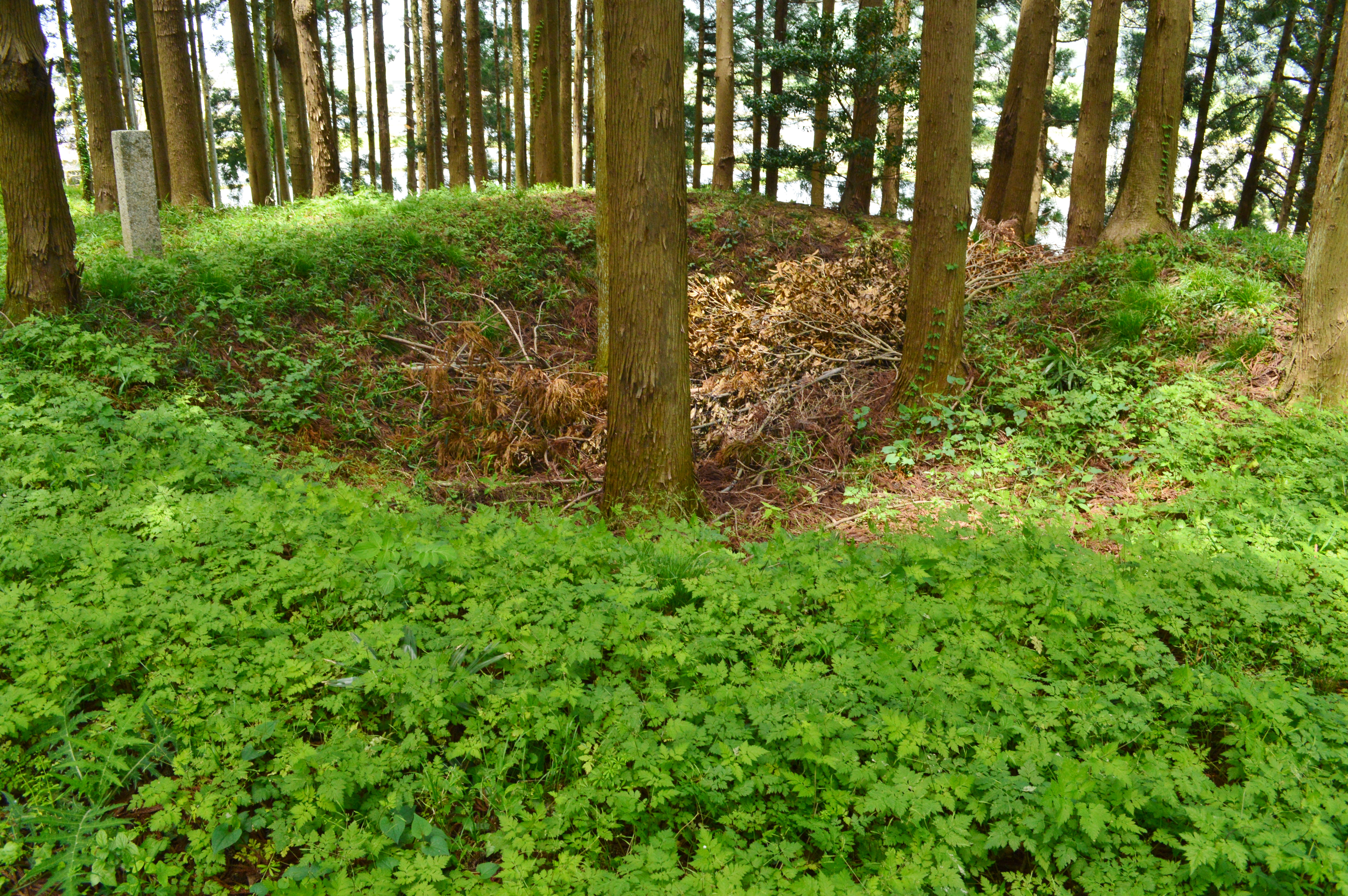
Circular portion

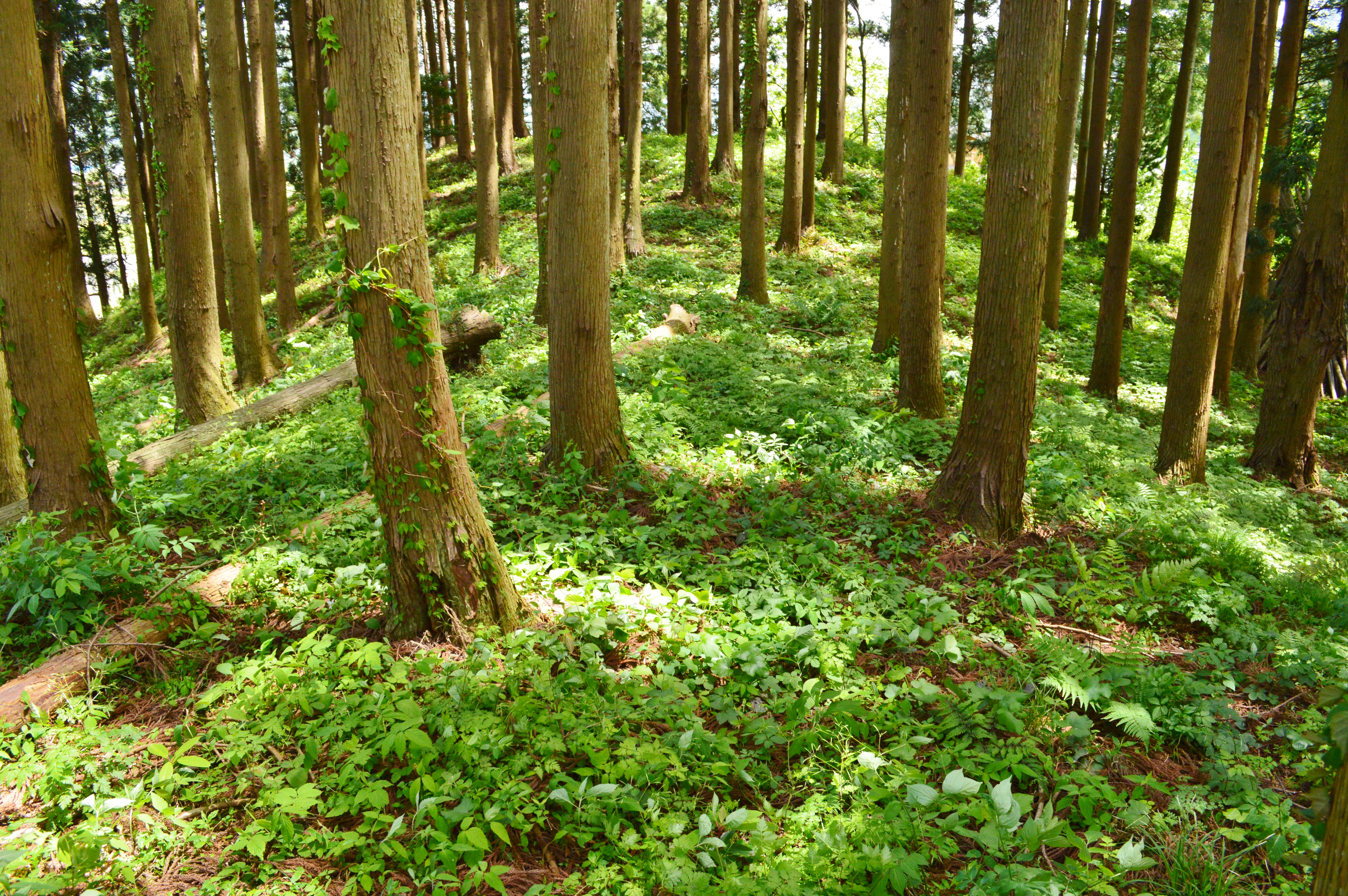
Circular portion

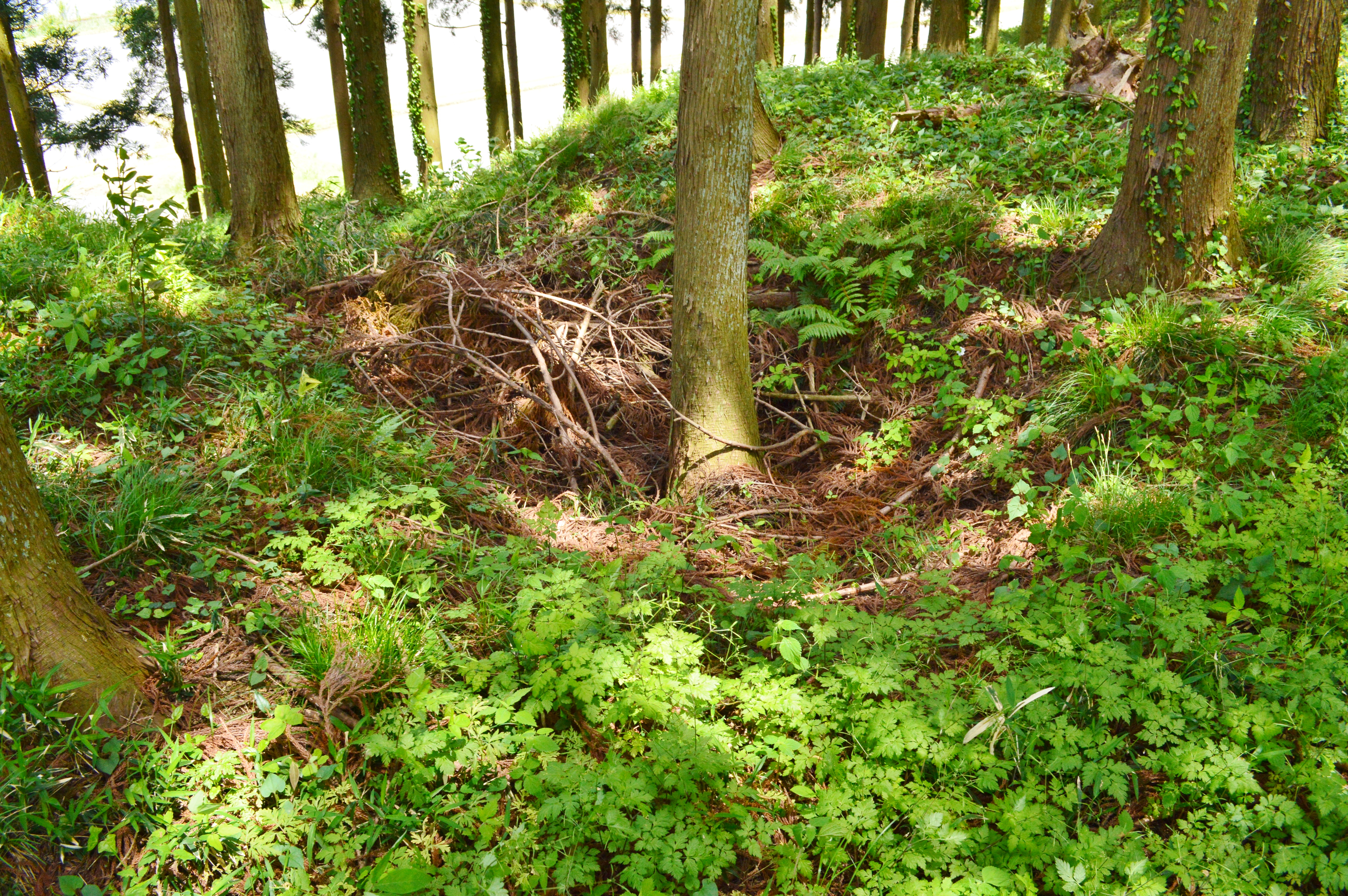
Rectangular portion

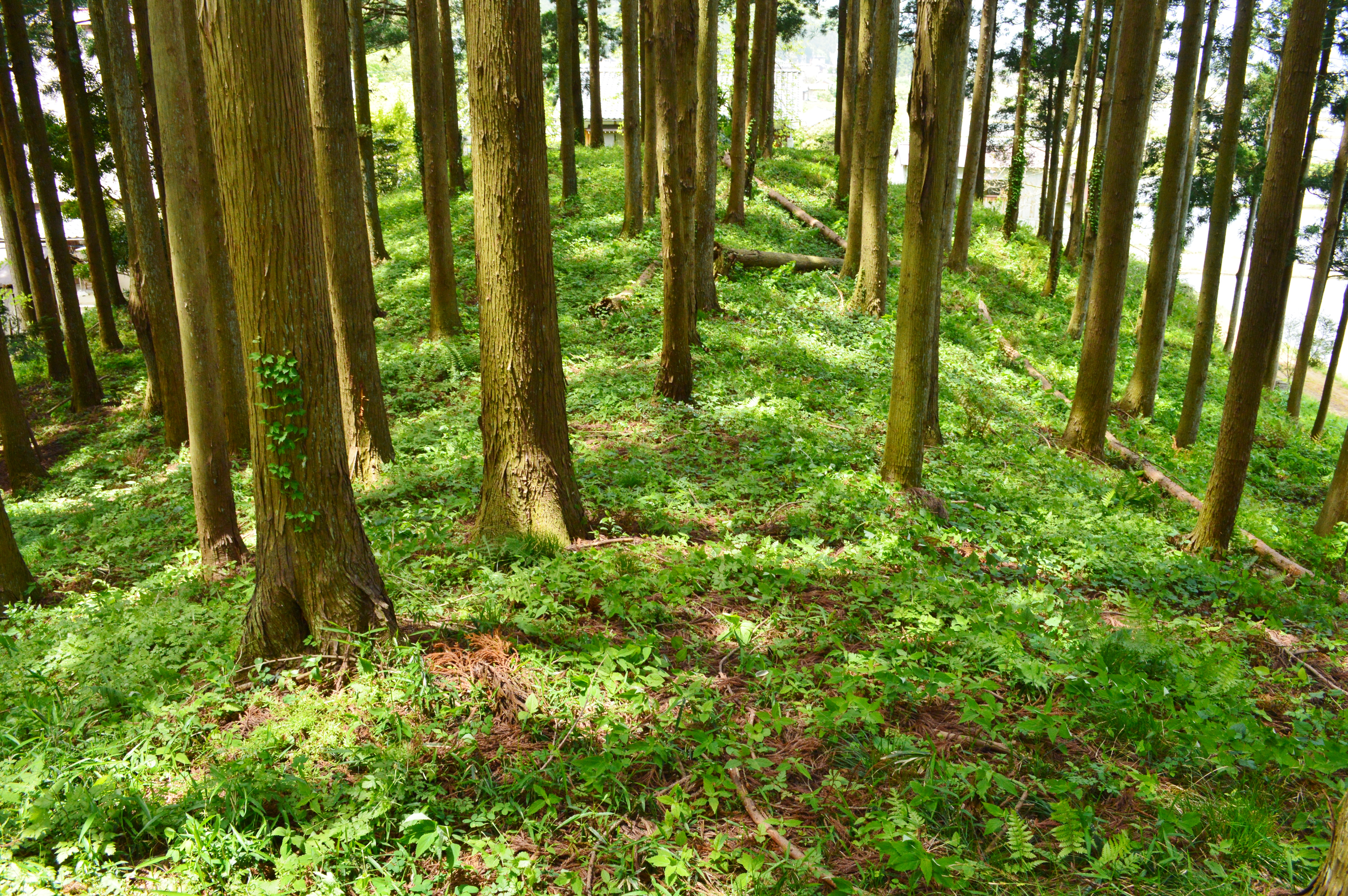
Rectangular portion

== See also ==
- List of Historic Sites of Japan (Fukui)
