= Mikatakaminaka District, Fukui =

Coordinates: 35.521°N 135.891°E

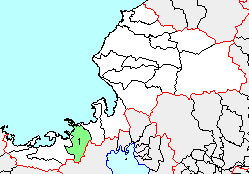
Location of Mikatakaminaka-gun, Fukui Prefecture, highlighted in green; with former areas in yellow.

Mikatakaminaka (三方上中郡, Mikatakaminaka-gun) is a district located in Fukui Prefecture, Japan. The district was formed on March 31, 2005 at the same time as the merger of the towns of Mikata (from Mikata District) and Kaminaka (from Onyū District) forming the town of Wakasa.

As of October 1, 2020, the district has an estimated population of 14,003 and a density of 78.45 persons per km^{2}. The total area is 178.5 km^{2}.

== Towns and villages ==
The district consists of one town:

- Wakasa
