= Fukui Prefectural Varve Museum =

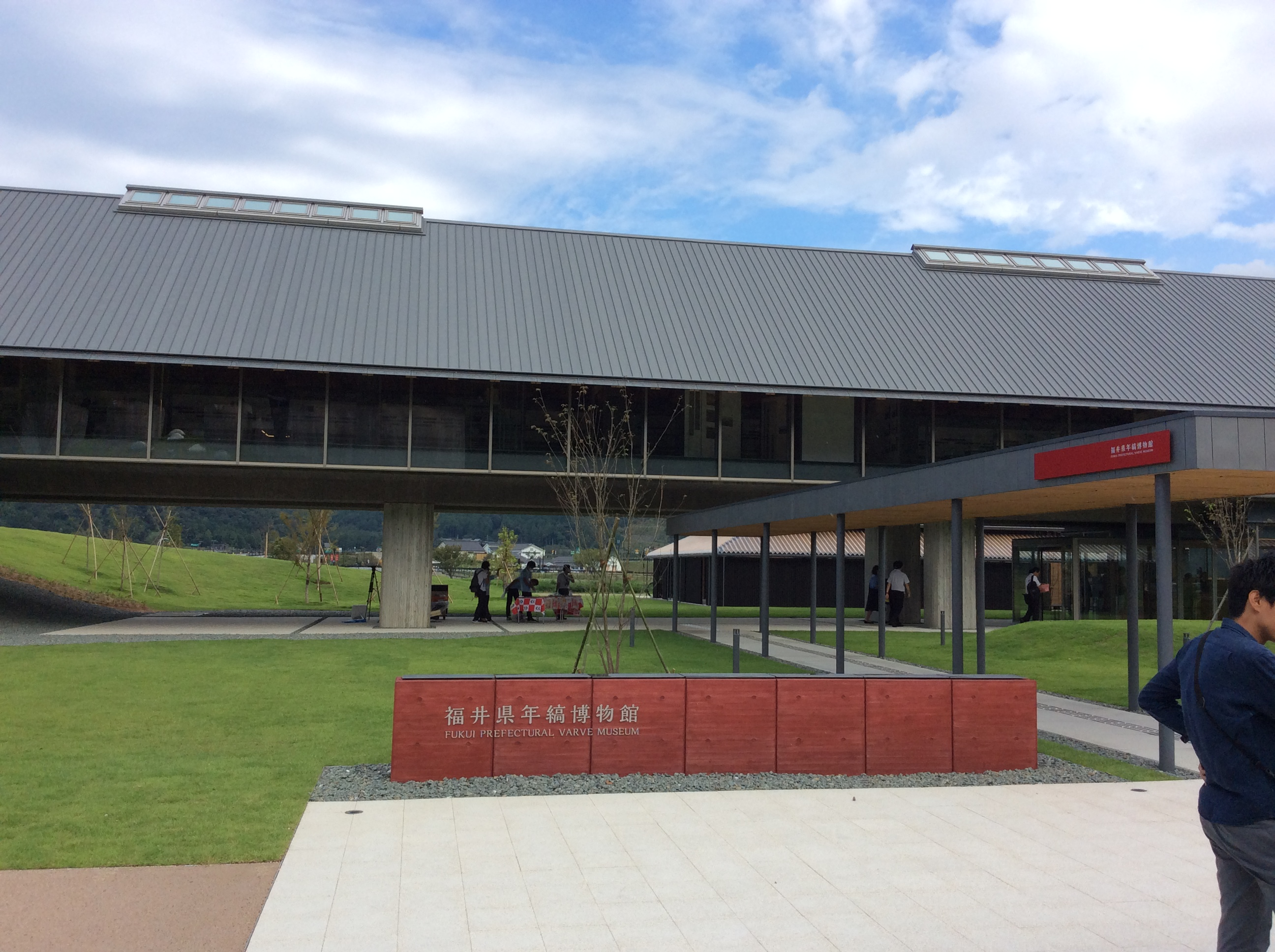

- Location of Fukui Prefectural Varve Museum Fukui Prefectural Varve Museum (Japan)
- Location: 122-121-1 Torihama, Wakasa, Mikatakaminaka, Fukui Prefecture
- Coordinates: 35.559056°N 135.897278°E
- Type: geological museum
- Director: Kazuma Yamane
- Public transit access: JR West Obama Line Mikata Station
- Website: http://varve-museum.pref.fukui.lg.jp

Fukui Prefectural Varve Museum is a geological and archeological museum located in Wakasa, Mikatakaminaka District, Fukui Prefecture, Japan. It features varve ranging from 70,000 years ago to the present, as found at the bottom of Lake Suigetsu. The special chairman is Kazuma Yamane.

== Main Exhibition ==
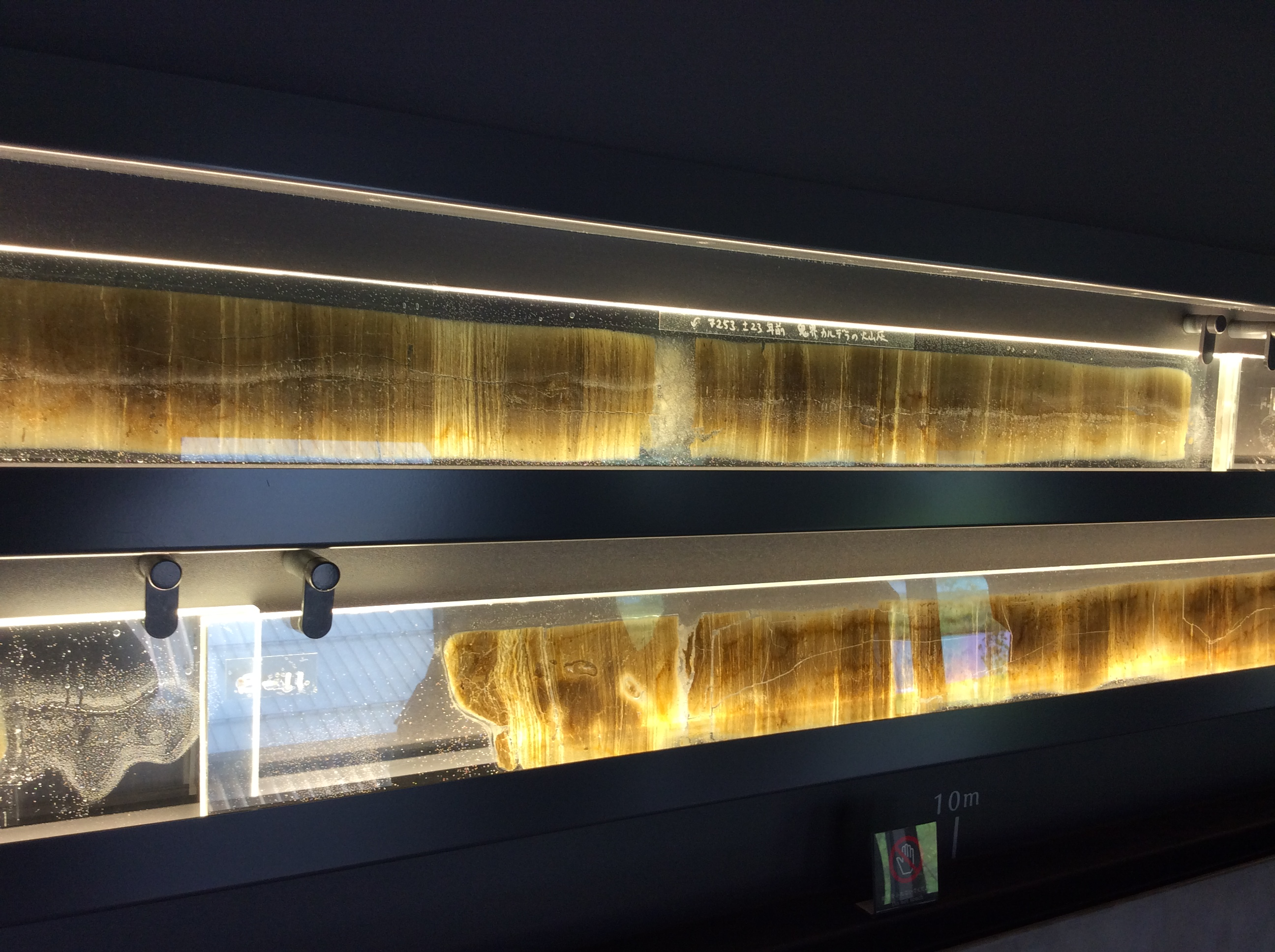
A thin section of varve on display in Fukui Prefectural Varve Museum. Showing evidence of eruption of Kikai Caldera.

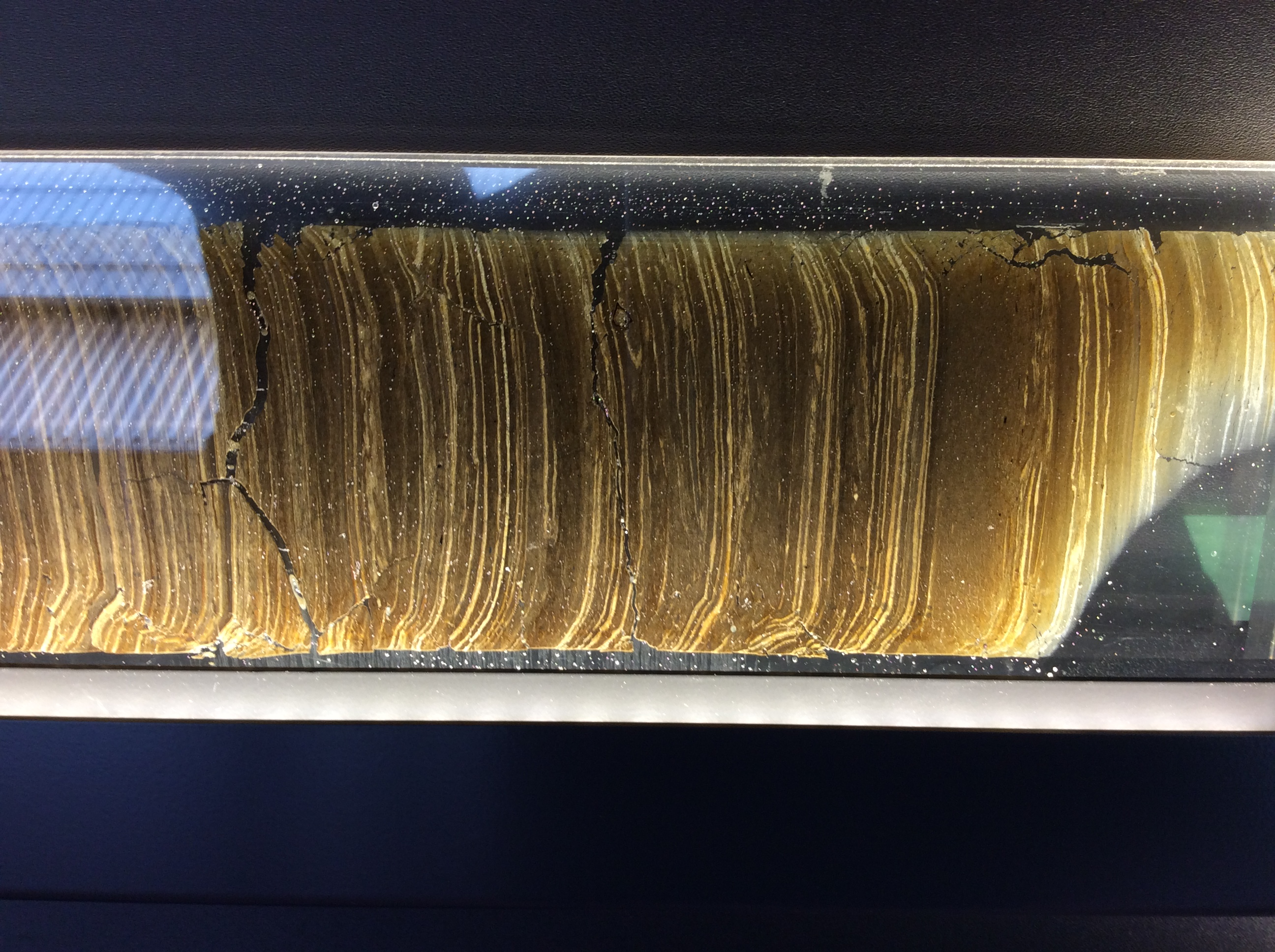
A thin section of varve on display in Fukui Prefectural Varve Museum. A higher magnification.

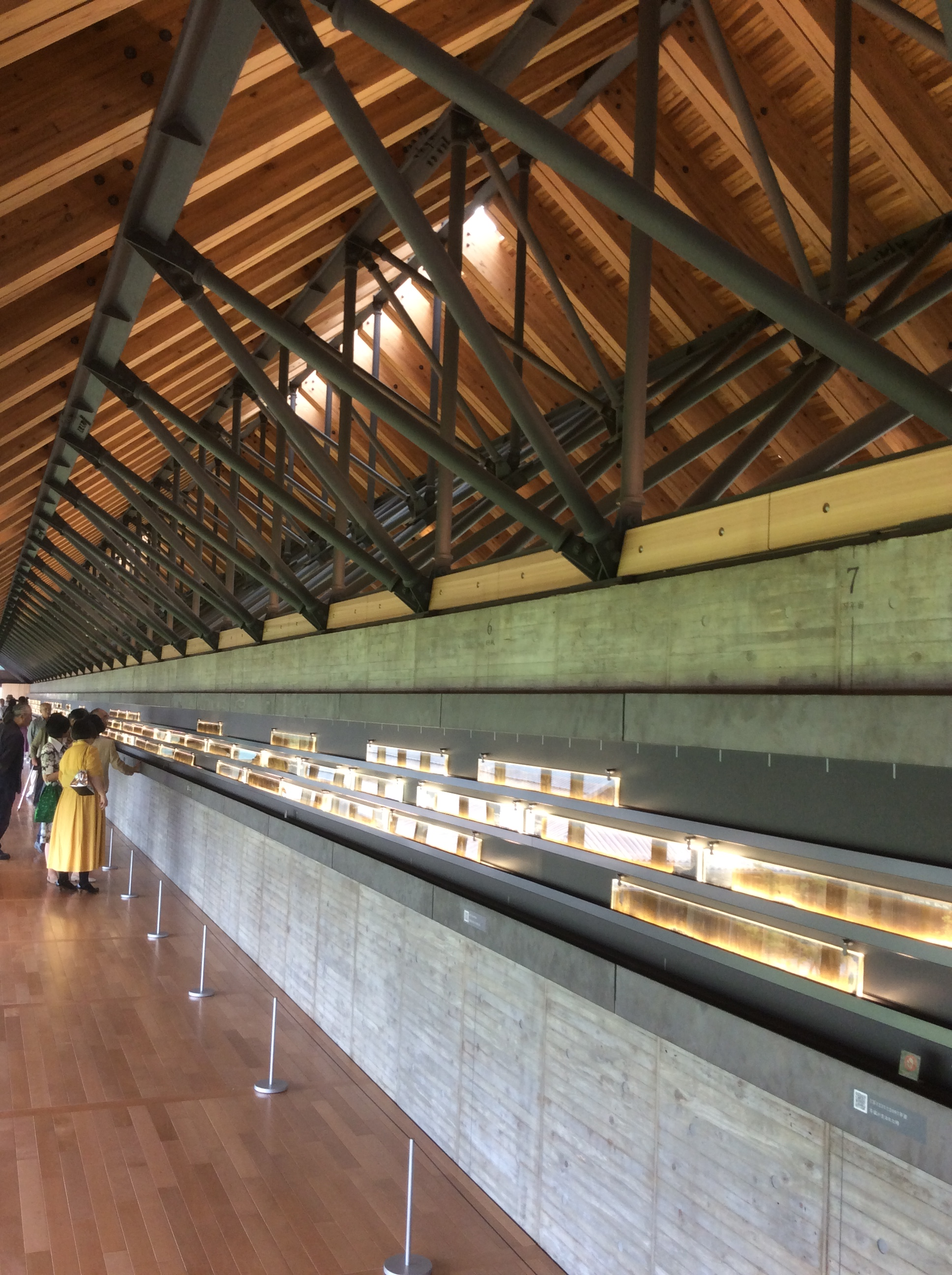
Interior view of Fukui Prefectural Varve Museum. Thin section of varve on display.

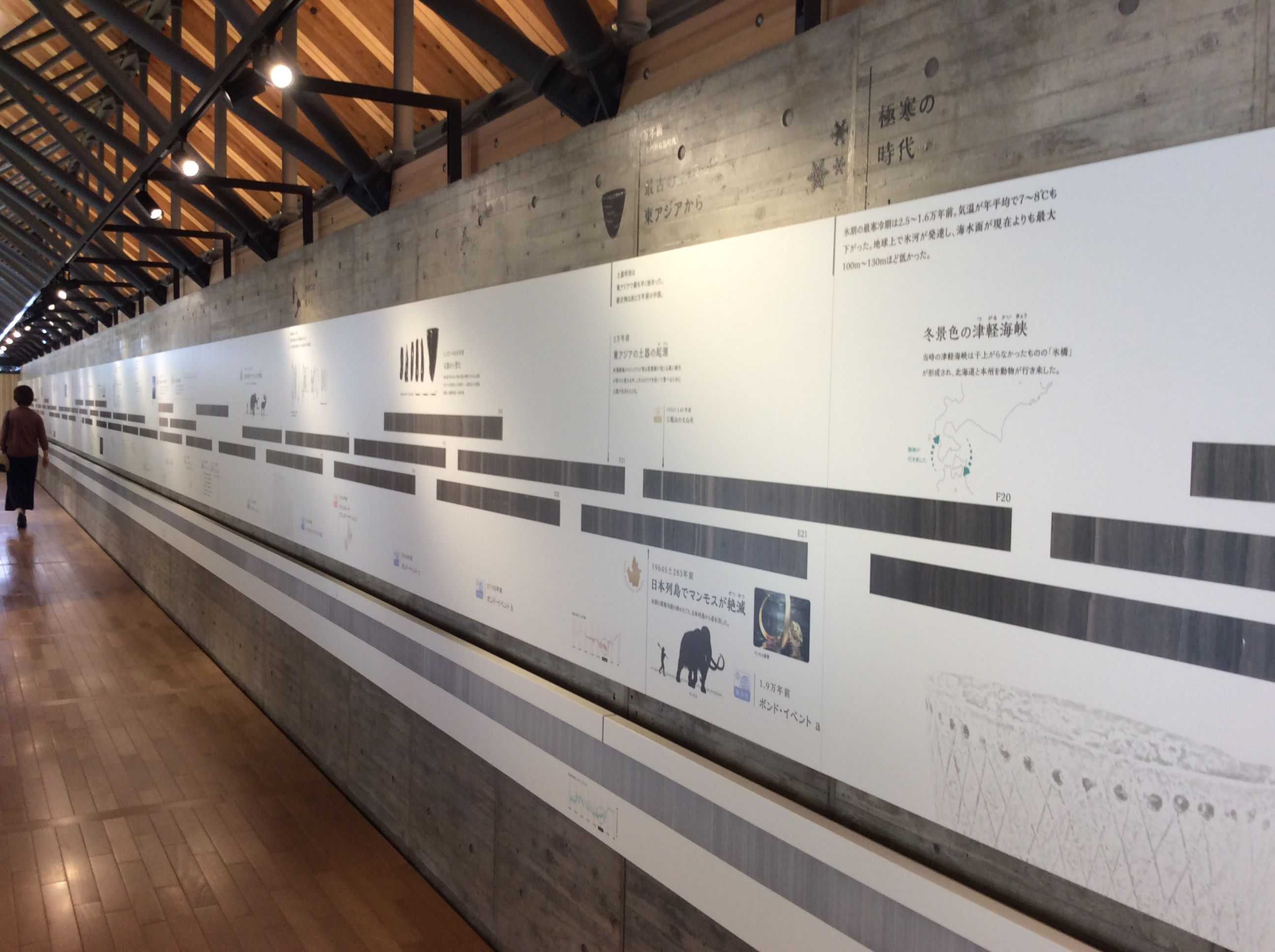
Interior view of Fukui Prefectural Varve Museum. Varve and various historical/archaeological evidence are discussed together.

Lake Suigetsu, one of Five Lakes of Mikata, is located in Wakasa Town, Mikatakaminaka District, Fukui Prefecture. It is a brackish water lake, with an area of 4.06 km², a perimeter of 9.85 km, and a maximum depth of 38.0 m, making it the largest among the five. It lacks directly inflowing river which can disturb the precipitate on the lake bottom. Because of this, the sediments annually form varve and then remain undisturbed. In addition, the lack of oxygen in the water at the lake bottom make it inhabitable to lifeforms, which also helps to keep the varve undisturbed. Also, because of a fault running nearby, the lake gradually lowers its altitude and is never filled up with sediments. With these serendipitous conditions combined, the varve found in the Lake Suigetsu is now known as “Miraculous Sediments”.

The investigation of Lake Suigetsu started on 1991. In boring expedition on 2006, it was not possible to recover 70 m-long varve as one continuous core. Therefore the boring was conducted from 4 different spots, each 1 m long at a time. By matching varve patterns between the core samples, a 70 m-long varve was reconstituted. This equals to a 160,000 year-long varve without any discontinuity and was named SG06 (from Suigetsu, 2006). A team of international collaboration members from Japan, UK, and Germany measured the ratio between radiocarbon ^{14}C and stable isotope ^{12}C throughout the layers of the varve and obtained calibration data of radiocarbon dating 11,200 – 52,800 years ago. This result was published in Science . The error of this calibration is estimated to be about 170 years in 50,000. From this precision, the data obtained from Lake Suigetsu is determined to be the world de facto standard of the radiocarbon dating for geological science in International Radiocarbon Conference held in UNESCO Headaquater in France on July 13, 2014.

This museum introduces research on the varve in Lake Suigetsu. A thin-sectioned 45 meter-long sample of varve embedded in epoxy is on display. Other exhibitions cover the formation of varve in Lake Suigetsu, varves from around the world, the paleoclimate around Lake Suigetsu decoded from the varve, and other archeoclimatological findings. Some of the exhibitions have QR codes to read explanation. However, at this point, the explanations are given only in Japanese.

== Access ==
- About a 20–25 minute walk or 10 min by rental bicycle from Mikata Station of JR Obama Line.
- Wakasa town bus Tsunegami-Mikata line for Tsunegami. 13 min ride to Jomon Roman Park where the museum is located.

== Facilities Nearby ==
Located within Jomon Roman Park, near Lake Mikata, at the mouth of Hasu river. Also located in the park are, Wakasa Mikata Jomon Museum, Jomon Colosseum, Roadside station "Michino Eki, Five Lakes of Mikata" and Fukui Prefectural Satoyama-Satoumi Research Institute.

== Visitor Information ==
Closed on Tuesdays (except on holidays, in which case it is closed on the following Wednesday) and at the end and beginning of the year. Discount rates apply to a joint ticket with the Wakasa Mikata Jomon Museum.

== See also ==
- Five Lakes of Mikata
- Wakasa Mikata Jomon Museum
