= Suigetsu =

Suigetsu may refer to:

- Suigetsu Hozuki, a villain from the Naruto series
- Suigetsu Mayoi Gokoro, a port of the video game by KID to the Dreamcast system, released on October 28, 2004.
- Suigetsu (Danzan-ryu Jujitsu Technique)
- Lake Suigetsu in Japan
