= Mikata Station =

Railway station in Wakasa, Fukui Prefecture, Japan

Mikata Station 三方駅
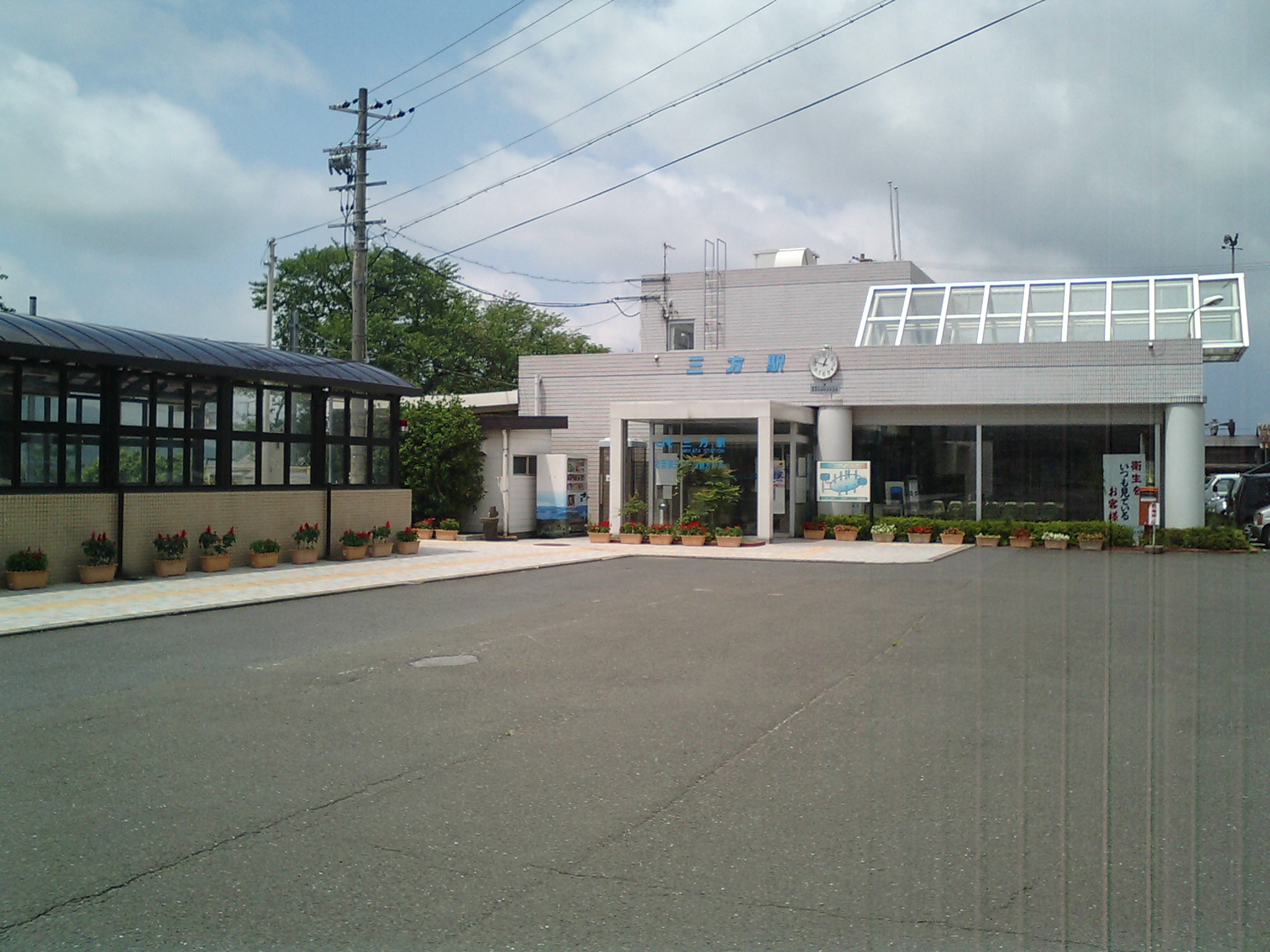
- Mikata Station in August 2009

General information
- Location: 43-5 Mikata, Wakasa-cho, Mikatakaminaka-gun, Fukui-ken 919-1303; Japan
- Coordinates: 35.5555°N 135.9094°E
- Operator: JR West
- Line: ■ Obama Line
- Distance: 24.7 km from Tsuruga
- Platforms: 1 side platform
- Tracks: 1

Other information
- Status: Staffed ( Midori no Madoguchi )
- Website: Official website

History
- Opened: 15 December 1917; 108 years ago

Passengers
- FY 2023: 168 daily
Location
- Location within Japan

Mikata Station (三方駅, Mikata-eki) is a railway station in the town of Wakasa, Mikatakaminaka District, Fukui Prefecture, Japan, operated by West Japan Railway Company (JR West).

== Lines ==
Mikata Station is served by the Obama Line, and is located 24.7 kilometers from the terminus of the line at Tsuruga.

== Station layout ==
The station consists of one island platform, of which one side is not in operation and is now a flower bed. The other side serves as a side platform serving a single bi-directional track, connected to the station building by an underground passage. The station has a Midori no Madoguchi staffed ticket office.

== Adjacent stations ==
«	Service	»
Obama Line
Kiyama	Local	Fujii

== Local Transport ==
- Wakasa town bus Tsunegami-Mikata line.
- Rental bicycle.

== History ==
Mikata Station opened on 15 December 1917. With the privatization of Japanese National Railways (JNR) on 1 April 1987, the station came under the control of JR West.

== Passenger statistics ==
In fiscal 2016, the station was used by an average of 89 passengers daily (boarding passengers only).

== Surrounding area ==
- National Route 27
- National Route 162
- Wakasa Town Hall
- Torihama shell mound 15-20 min walk
- Wakasa Mikata Jomon Museum 20-25 min walk.
- Fukui Prefectural Varve Museum 20-25 min walk.

== See also ==
- List of railway stations in Japan
