= Mikata Five Lakes =

Coordinates: 35°34′19.9″N 135°53′04.0″E

- 三方五湖
- IUCN category IV (habitat/species management area)
- Composite aerial photograph from the Ministry of Land, Infrastructure, Transport and Tourism

- Location within Fukui Prefecture
- Location: Japan
- Nearest city: Mihama, Fukui

Ramsar Wetland
- Official name: Mikata-goko
- Designated: 8 November 2005
- Reference no.: 1549

Mikata Five Lakes (Japanese: 三方五湖(みかたごこ), Hepburn: Mikata-goko), also called the Five Lakes of Mikata, are a series of brackish and freshwater lakes located in Mihama and Wakasa, Fukui, Japan, which are close to the coast of Wakasa Bay. They consist of Lakes Mikata (三方湖), Suigetsu (水月湖), Suga (菅湖), Kugushi (久々子湖) and Hiruga (日向湖). These five lakes are all located in Wakasa Wan Quasi-National Park. In 2005 the lakes were designated as a Ramsar site. The Lake Suigetsu is famous for its varves, which were adopted as a global standard for dating geological and historical relics in 2012.

== Geography ==
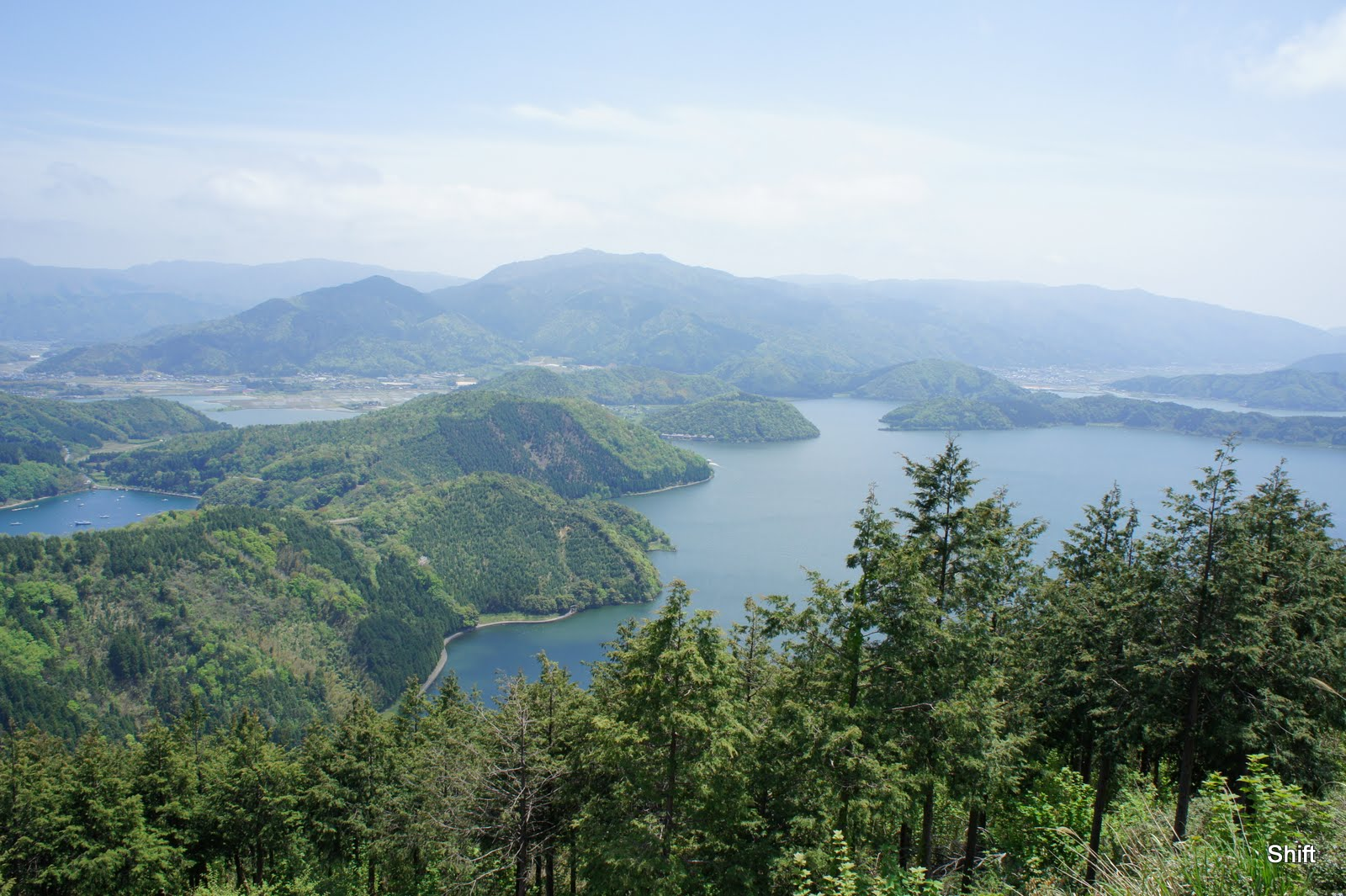
Lake Mikata in 2011

Mikata Five Lakes refers to Lakes Maikata, Suigetsu, Suga, Kugushi and Hiruga. Lakes Mikata, Suigetsu and Suga, which are located in the southern part, are connected with each other via natural straits. In addition, Urami Canal built in 1664 connects Lake Kugushi with Suigetsu, and Saga Tunnel built in 1934 connects Lake Hiruga with Suigetsu.

Name	Salinity	Surface area	Elevation	Max depth	Shore length
Lake Mikata	Fresh water	3.56 km^{2} (1.37 mi^{2})	0 m	5.8 m	9.6 km (6.0 mi)
Lake Suigetsu	Brackish water	4.16 km^{2} (1.61 mi^{2})	0 m	34 m	11 km (6.8 mi)
Lake Suga	Brackish water	0.91 km^{2} (0.35 mi^{2})	0 m	13.0 m	4.2 km (2.6 mi)
Lake Kugushi	Brackish water	1.40 km^{2} (0.54 mi^{2})	0 m	2.5 m	7.0 km (4.3 mi)
Lake Hiruga	Saline water	0.92 km^{2} (0.36 mi^{2})	0 m	38.5 m	4.0 km (2.5 mi)

== See also ==
- List of lakes of Japan
- List of Ramsar sites in Japan
- Wakasa Wan Quasi-National Park
- Lake Suigetsu
- Torihama shell mound
- Wakasa Mikata Jomon Museum
