= Mihama Station =

Railway station in Mihama, Fukui Prefecture, Japan

Mihama Station 美浜駅
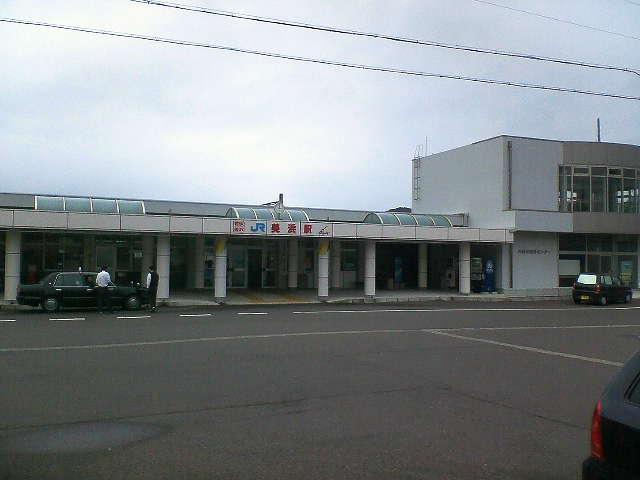
- Mihama Station in June 2006

General information
- Location: 35-1 Matsubara, Mihama Town, Mikata District, Fukui Prefecture 919-1122; Japan
- Coordinates: 35.6050°N 135.9365°E
- Operator: JR West
- Line: Obama Line
- Distance: 17.9 km (11.1 mi) from Tsuruga
- Platforms: 2 side platforms
- Tracks: 2

Construction
- Structure type: At grade

Other information
- Status: Staffed ( Midori no Madoguchi)
- Website: Official website

History
- Opened: 15 December 1917; 108 years ago
- Former names: Kawaharaichi (to 1956)

Passengers
- FY 2023: 338 daily

Services
Preceding station	JR West	Following station
Kiyama towards Higashi-Maizuru	Obama Line Local	Higashi-Mihama towards Tsuruga
Location
- Location within Fukui Prefecture Location within Kansai region Location within Japan

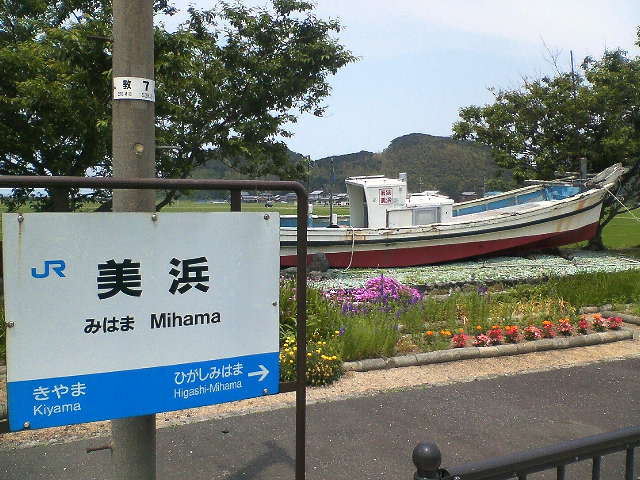

Mihama Station (美浜駅, Mihama-eki) is a railway station in the town of Mihama, Mikata District, Fukui Prefecture, Japan, operated by West Japan Railway Company (JR West).

== Lines ==
Mihama Station is served by the Obama Line, and is located 17.9 kilometers from the terminus of the line at Tsuruga.

== Station layout ==
The station consists of two opposed side platforms connected by a footbridge. The station has a Midori no Madoguchi staffed ticket office.

=== Platforms ===
1	■ Obama Line	for Tsuruga
2	■ Obama Line	for Obama and Higashi-Maizuru

== History ==
Mihama Station opened on 15 December 1917 as Kawaharaichi Station (河原市駅, Kawaharaichi-eki). It was renamed to its present name on 10 April 1956. With the privatization of Japanese National Railways (JNR) on 1 April 1987, the station came under the control of JR West.

== Passenger statistics ==
In fiscal 2016, the station was used by an average of 282 passengers daily (boarding passengers only).

== Surrounding area ==
- Mihama Tourist Association
- National Route 27

== See also ==
- List of railway stations in Japan
