= Michiko Chiura =

Japanese archaeologist

- 千浦美智子
- Born: 1947/48
- Died: 1982
- Education: University of Toronto
- Occupation: Archaeologist
- Employer: International Christian University
- Known for: Pioneering the study of coprolites in Japan

Michiko Chiura, also Michiko Mori-Chiura, Japanese: 千浦美智子 (1947/48 - 1982) was a Japanese archaeologist, who was an early proponent of archaeological flotation in Japan. In the 1970s she pioneered the study of coprolites in Japan, with particular focus on those from the Torihama shell mound in Fukui Prefecture. Chiura studied for her undergraduate degree at the University of Toronto, then subsequently worked at the International Christian University in Tokyo. She died aged 35 in 1982. Her death from cancer, and attitude to life, was written about by Shigeaki Hinohara, who was her physician.

== Selected works ==
- 千浦美智子. "環境復原とフロテーション その植物利用範囲." 季刊どるめん 13 (1977): 32-40.
- 中津由紀子, 千浦美智子, and 小田静夫. "J・E・ キダー編 (1977) 新橋遺跡." 国際基督教大学考古学研究センター 4: 1-214.
