= Kiyama Station (Fukui) =

Railway station in Wakasa, Fukui Prefecture, Japan

Kiyama Station 気山駅
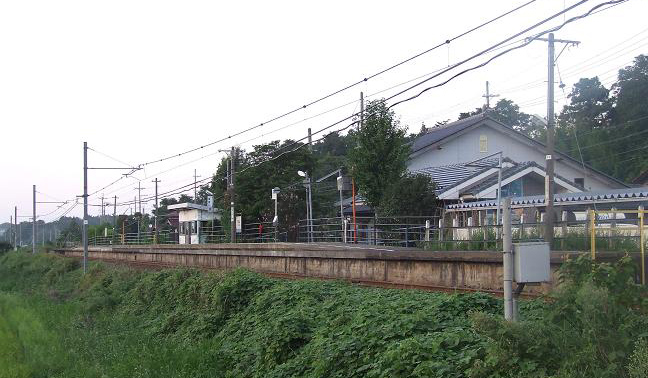
- Kiyama Station platform in August 2007

General information
- Location: 135-6 Kiyama, Wakasa-cho, Mikatakaminaka-gun, Fukui-ken 919-1301; Japan
- Coordinates: 35.5851°N 135.9098°E
- Operator: JR West
- Line: ■ Obama Line
- Distance: 21.4 km from Tsuruga
- Platforms: 1 side platform
- Tracks: 1

Other information
- Status: Unstaffed
- Website: Official website

History
- Opened: 1 August 1961; 65 years ago

Passengers
- FY 2023: 680 daily
Location
- Location within Japan

Kiyama Station (気山駅, Kiyama-eki) is a railway station in the town of Wakasa, Mikatakaminaka District, Fukui Prefecture, Japan, operated by West Japan Railway Company (JR West).

== Lines ==
Kiyama Station is served by the Obama Line, and is located 21.4 kilometers from the terminus of the line at Tsuruga.

== Station layout ==
The station consists of one side platform serving a single bi-directional track. There is no station building, but only a shelter on the platform. The station is unattended.

== Adjacent stations ==
«	Service	»
Obama Line
Rapid: Does not stop at this station
Mihama	Local	Mikata

== History ==
Kiyama Station opened on 1 August 1961. With the privatization of Japanese National Railways (JNR) on 1 April 1987, the station came under the control of JR West.

== Passenger statistics ==
In fiscal 2016, the station was used by an average of 304 passengers daily (boarding passengers only).

== Surrounding area ==
- National Route 27
- Uwase Jinja

== See also ==
- List of railway stations in Japan
