= Higashi-Mihama Station =

Railway station in Mihama, Fukui Prefecture, Japan

Higashi-Mihama Station 東美浜駅
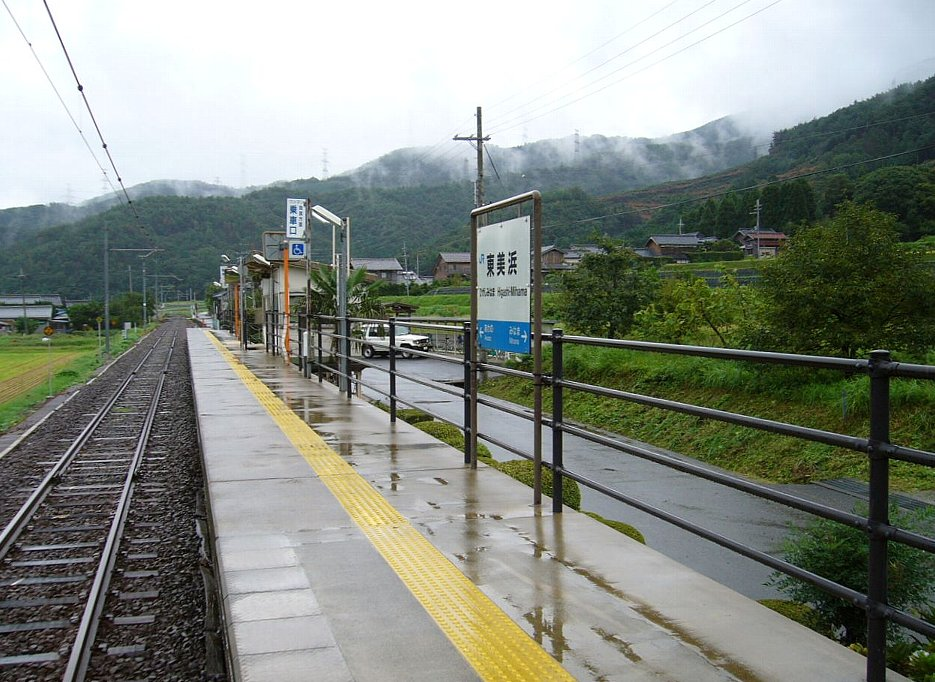
- Higashi-Mihama station platform (September 2006)

General information
- Location: 18-10 Ota, Mihama Town, Mikata District, Fukui Prefecture 919-1206; Japan
- Coordinates: 35.6141°N 135.9854°E
- Operator: JR West
- Line: Obama Line
- Distance: 12.7 km (7.9 mi) from Tsuruga
- Platforms: 1 side platform
- Tracks: 1

Construction
- Structure type: At grade

Other information
- Status: Unstaffed
- Website: Official website

History
- Opened: 1 August 1961; 65 years ago

Passengers
- FY 2023: 64 daily

Services
Preceding station	JR West	Following station
Mihama towards Higashi-Maizuru	Obama Line Local	Awano towards Tsuruga
Location
- Location within Fukui Prefecture Location within Kansai region Location within Japan

Higashi-Mihama Station (東美浜駅, Higashi-Mihama-eki) is a railway station in the town of Mihama, Mikata District, Fukui Prefecture, Japan, operated by West Japan Railway Company (JR West).

== Lines ==
Higashi-Mihama Station is served by the Obama Line, and is located 12.7 kilometers from the terminus of the line at Tsuruga.

== Station layout ==
The station consists of one side platform serving a single bi-directional track. There is no station building, but only a shelter on the platform. The station is unattended.

== History ==
Higashi-Mihama Station opened on 1 August 1961. With the privatization of Japanese National Railways (JNR) on 1 April 1987, the station came under the control of JR West.

== Passenger statistics ==
In fiscal 2016, the station was used by an average of 34 passengers daily (boarding passengers only).

== Surrounding area ==
- Mihama-Higashi Elementary School

== See also ==
- List of railway stations in Japan
