= Torihama shell mound =

Ancient settlement remains in Japan

- 鳥浜貝塚 (Japanese)
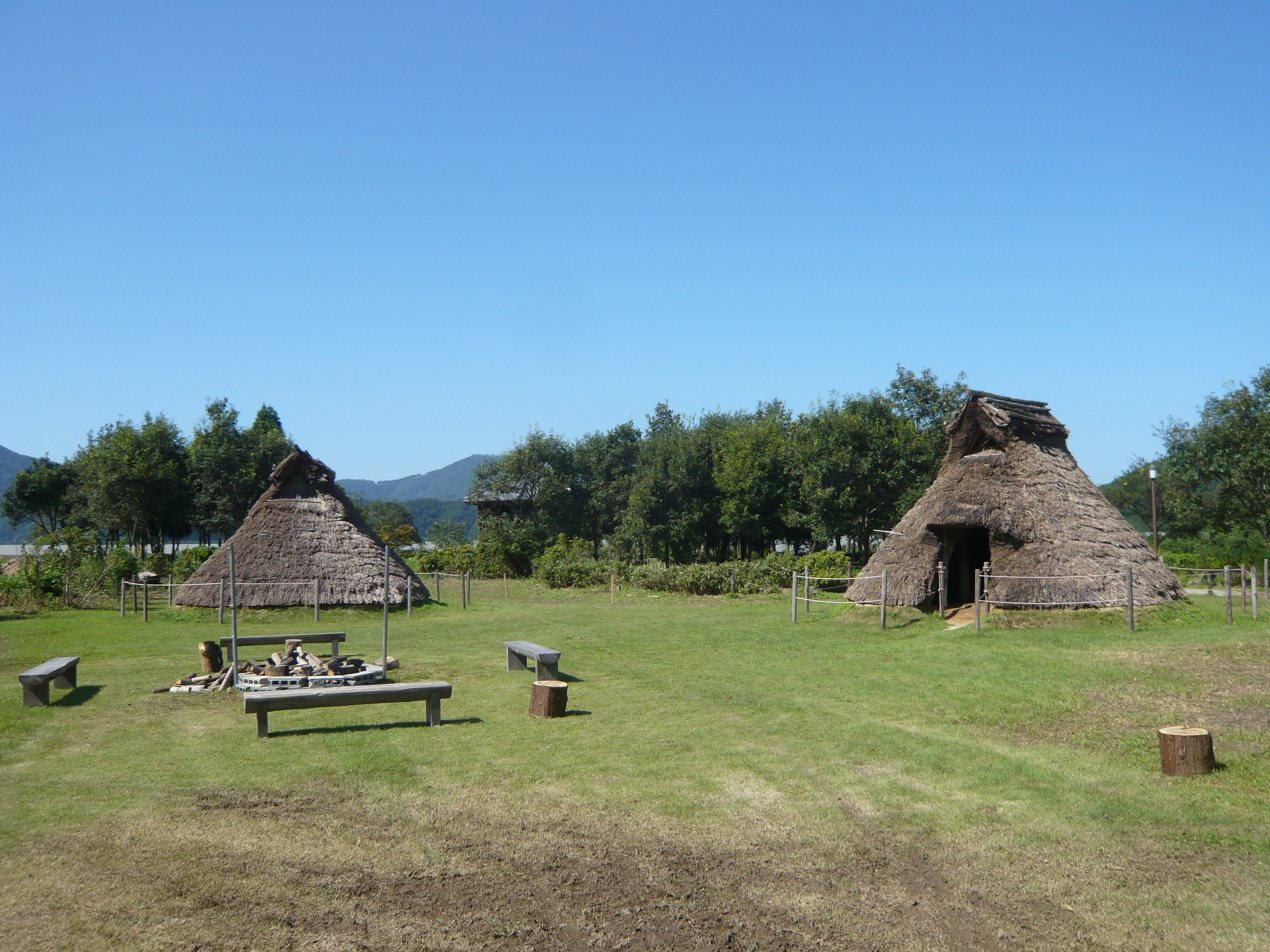
- Reconstructed pit dwellings at Torihama

- Torihama Shell Midden Torihama shell mound (Japan)
- 35.560°N 135.896°E
- Type: shell midden, settlement
- Periods: Jomon period
- Location: Wakasa, Fukui, Japan
- Region: Hokuriku region

Site notes
- Public access: Yes

The Torihama shell mound (鳥浜貝塚, Torihama kaizuka) is a shell midden and remains of an Early Jōmon period settlement located in the Torihama neighbourhood of the town of Wakasa, Fukui, in the Hokuriku region of Japan. It is a waterlogged midden site that was occupied mainly from the Incipient Jomon period to the Early Jomon period from 12,000 to 5,000 years ago (10,000–3,000 BC).

The site is located in the area of Lake Mikata, one of the Mikata five lakes, near the confluence of Hasu and Takase Rivers, within the borders of the Wakasa Wan Quasi-National Park. At that time, the Shiibayama hill on which the site is located extended like a cape from the west to the east, and Lake Mikata extended to the tip of the hill. On the southern slope of the hill, three pit dwellings were detected, indicating that there were settlements. The shell midden begins at a depth of 7 meters underground to 3 meters above ground. At the time it was used as a garbage dumping site, it was in the lake.

== Excavations ==
The excavation of the site was initiated in 1962, and conducted up to 1972 by Doshisha University in Kyoto, and Rikkyō University in Toyo. Starting in 1975, the Fukui Prefectural Board of Education continued the investigations. Important information about early agriculture in Japan in 7500–3500 BC was discovered.

== Discoveries ==
The cultural deposits are about 6 to 3 meters thick. Primarily fresh water shells are found in the midden. Ropes, reed baskets and similar items were plentiful.

Very old stone weights used for nets were excavated, as well as many other items made of stone. A large quantity of stone axes were found.

The inhabitants hunted various local fauna. Skeletal remains of the Japanese wolf have been found at Torihama dating 10,000 to 250 B.C.

=== Cultivated plants ===
In 2011, radioactive carbon dating has revealed that the lacquer tree found at the Torihama shell mounds is the oldest lacquer tree in the world, dating back 12600 years.

Evidence of early beefsteak plant perilla (Jap. 'egoma') was found. Other plants that were cultivated were bottle gourd, hemp (Cannabis sativa), paper mulberry (Broussonetia papyrifera), burdock, and mustard family plants (Brassicaceae). Weedy annuals and shrub fruits and nuts, such as acorns and walnuts, were also used by villagers. The latter comprised a very substantial part of the diet.

Chestnut (Castanea crenata Siebold & Zucc.) was also found, as well as water chestnut (trapa), and the regular sweet chestnut.

In terms of caloric intake, plant foods made up about half of the diet. Red beans (Adzuki beans), melon, and Chinese cabbage were also found.

=== Manufactured goods ===
Wood products of all kinds have been found, including lacquered pottery and combs. They represent the oldest known examples of Japanese lacquerware. The items were found by scholars from Tohoku University who investigated the site in 1984–2011, and they may date to 12,600 years ago.

Also found here was the oldest fabric product yet found in Japan—a rope made of hemp, dating back 12,000 years. Also, a woven item made of Boehmeria tricuspis, a vegetable fiber, was found.

=== Canoes ===
The 1981 excavation revealed the presence of some very old dugout canoes at the site; the oldest one was dated 5500 BP. This was the oldest canoe found in Japan. It is about 6 meters long, and made from the Japanese cedar tree. Burning was used in its manufacture, as well as adzes.

The majority of remains unearthed from the Torihama site are stored and exhibited at the Wakasa Mikata Jomon Museum in Obama (c. 20 km west of the site).

=== Coprolites ===
The discovery and study of coprolites from the site was pioneered by Michiko Chiura.

== See also ==
- Wakasa Mikata Jomon Museum

== Bibliography ==
- Hongo, H. (1989). Freshwater fishing in the early Jomon period (Japan): an analysis of fish remains from the Torihama shell-mound. Journal of Archaeological Science, 16(2),333-354.
- Habu, Junko; Matsui, Akira; Yamamoto, Naoto; Kanno, Tomonori (2011). "Shell midden archaeology in Japan: Aquatic food acquisition and long-term change in the Jomon culture". Quaternary International. 239 (1–2): 19–27. doi:10.1016/j.quaint.2011.03.014. ISSN 1040-6182.
- Morikawa, M., 1994. Torihama kaizuka 7000-nen no shiki, in Torihama Kaizuka, by M. Morikawa & S. Hashimoto. Tokyo: Yomiuri Shinbun-sha, 15–136. (In Japanese)
- Torihama Kaizuka Kenkyu Group, 1983. Torihama Kaizuka, vol. 3. Fukui: Fukui-ken Kyoiku Iinkai & Fukui-ken- ritsu Wakasa Rekishi Minzoku Shiryo-kan (In Japanese)
- Morikawa, M., and S. Hashimoto. 1994. The Torihama shellmound: a Jomon time capsule. Tokyo: Yomiuri Shimbunsha. (In Japanese)
- Matsui, A., and M. Kanehara. 2006. The question of prehistoric plant husbandry during the Jomon period in Japan. World Archaeology 38:259–273.
