= Mihama, Fukui =

Mihama 美浜町
- Town
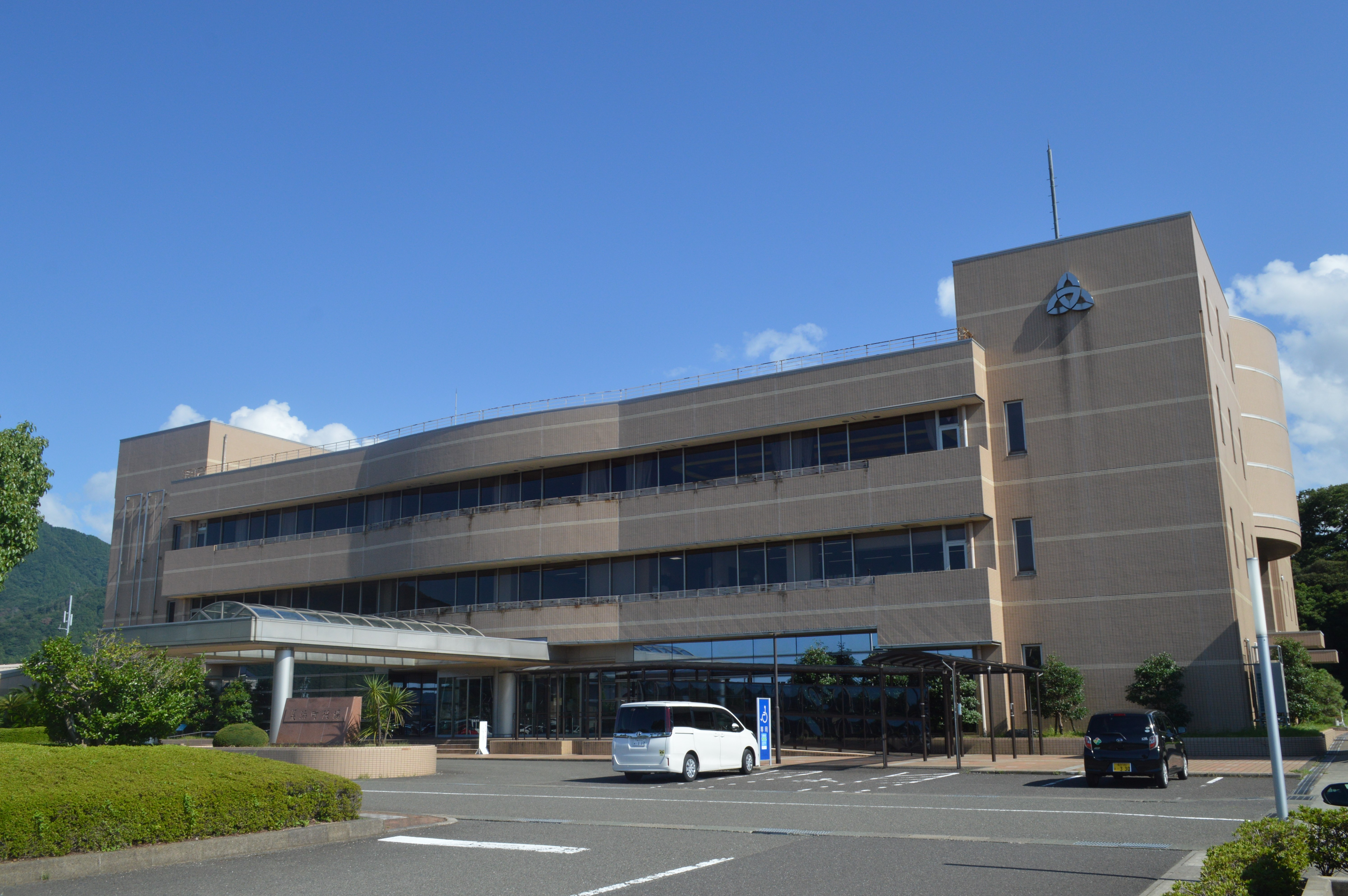
- Mihama Town Hall

- Flag Seal

- Location of Mihama in Fukui Prefecture

- Coordinates: 35°36′2.2″N 135°56′26.1″E
- Country: Japan
- Region: Chūbu (Hokuriku)
- Prefecture: Fukui
- District: Mikata

Area
  - Total: 152.38 km^{2} (58.83 sq mi)

Population (March 1, 2026)
  - Total: 8,526
  - Density: 55.95/km^{2} (144.9/sq mi)
- Time zone: UTC+9 (Japan Standard Time)
- Phone number: 0770-32-1111
- Address: 25-25, Goichi, Mihama-cho, Mikata-gun, Fukui-ken 919-1192
- Climate: Cfa
- Website: www.town.mihama.fukui.jp
- Symbols
- Flower: Rhododendron
- Tree: Pine

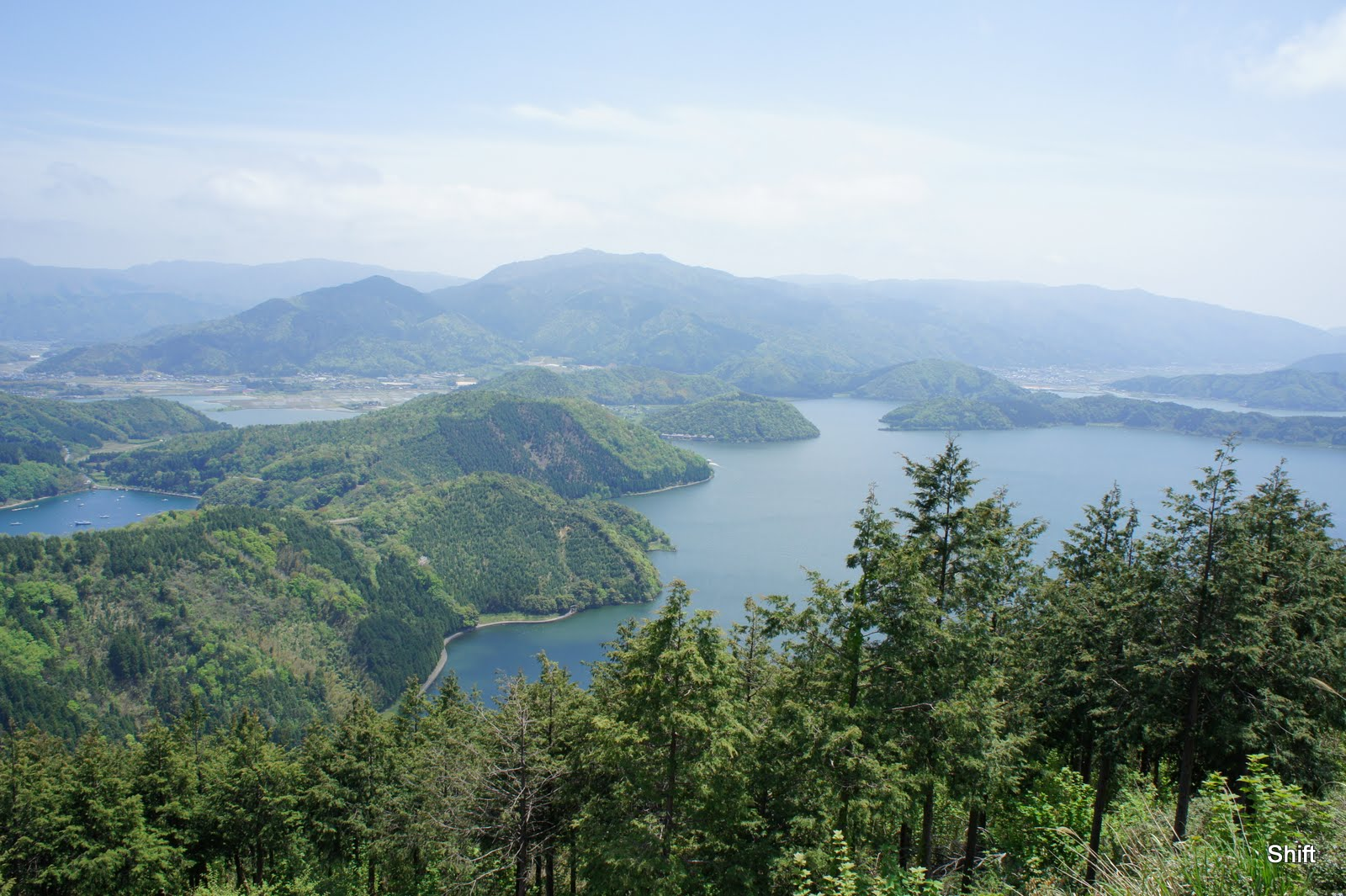
Mikata's five lakes

Mihama (美浜町, Mihama-chō) is a town located in Fukui Prefecture, Japan. As of 1 March 2026, the town had an estimated population of 8,526 in 3564 households and the population density of 56 persons per km^{2}. The total area of the town was 152.38 square kilometres (58.83 sq mi).

== Geography ==
Mihama is located in southwestern Fukui Prefecture, bordered by Shiga Prefecture to the south and the heavily indented ria coast of Wakasa Bay of Sea of Japan to the north. The town is at the easternmost edge of former Wakasa Province, and is sometimes referred to as "Wakasa-Mihama". It features a topography where mountains rise behind the sea, with the Tsuruga Peninsula to the east and the Tsunegami Peninsula to the west. The town area encompasses what is commonly known as Mihama Bay. The mountains on the border with Shiga Prefecture are relatively low, around 800 meters in height. The Mikata Five Lakes are located on the border with Wakasa Town. Plains open up in the basin of the Mimikawa River, which flows into the bay from the south. Parts of the town are within the borders of the Wakasa Wan Quasi-National Park.

=== Neighbouring municipalities ===
Fukui Prefecture

- Tsuruga
- Wakasa

Shiga Prefecture

- Takashima

=== Climate ===
Mihama has a humid subtropical climate (Cfa per the Köppen climate classification system) characterized by warm, wet summers and cold winters with heavy snowfall. The average annual temperature in Mihama is 15.0 °C (59.0 °F). The average annual rainfall is 2,196.2 mm (86.46 in) with December as the wettest month. The temperatures are highest on average in August, at around 27.0 °C (80.6 °F), and lowest in January, at around 4.3 °C (39.7 °F).

Climate data for Mihama (1991−2020 normals, extremes 1978−present)
Month	Jan	Feb	Mar	Apr	May	Jun	Jul	Aug	Sep	Oct	Nov	Dec	Year
Record high °C (°F)	17.8 (64.0)	21.3 (70.3)	26.3 (79.3)	29.9 (85.8)	33.9 (93.0)	36.7 (98.1)	38.1 (100.6)	38.2 (100.8)	36.1 (97.0)	31.5 (88.7)	26.1 (79.0)	23.8 (74.8)	38.2 (100.8)
Mean daily maximum °C (°F)	7.8 (46.0)	8.2 (46.8)	11.9 (53.4)	17.3 (63.1)	22.1 (71.8)	25.4 (77.7)	29.7 (85.5)	31.4 (88.5)	27.4 (81.3)	21.9 (71.4)	16.5 (61.7)	10.8 (51.4)	19.2 (66.6)
Daily mean °C (°F)	4.3 (39.7)	4.6 (40.3)	7.6 (45.7)	12.6 (54.7)	17.5 (63.5)	21.4 (70.5)	25.6 (78.1)	27.0 (80.6)	23.1 (73.6)	17.6 (63.7)	12.2 (54.0)	7.0 (44.6)	15.0 (59.1)
Mean daily minimum °C (°F)	1.1 (34.0)	0.9 (33.6)	3.2 (37.8)	7.8 (46.0)	13.0 (55.4)	17.8 (64.0)	22.3 (72.1)	23.5 (74.3)	19.5 (67.1)	13.6 (56.5)	8.0 (46.4)	3.3 (37.9)	11.2 (52.1)
Record low °C (°F)	−6.0 (21.2)	−6.8 (19.8)	−4.1 (24.6)	−0.7 (30.7)	4.2 (39.6)	7.9 (46.2)	14.2 (57.6)	15.2 (59.4)	10.1 (50.2)	3.8 (38.8)	−0.7 (30.7)	−3.5 (25.7)	−6.8 (19.8)
Average precipitation mm (inches)	257.1 (10.12)	161.9 (6.37)	148.1 (5.83)	122.6 (4.83)	141.0 (5.55)	143.1 (5.63)	192.7 (7.59)	175.1 (6.89)	226.3 (8.91)	162.7 (6.41)	170.7 (6.72)	297.3 (11.70)	2,196.2 (86.46)
Average precipitation days (≥ 1.0 mm)	22.8	17.9	15.6	12.0	11.3	11.4	12.6	9.8	12.6	12.7	15.0	21.2	174.9
Mean monthly sunshine hours	61.5	78.0	133.5	172.6	190.8	144.3	161.2	212.0	151.0	144.7	106.9	71.5	1,628
Source: Japan Meteorological Agency

== Demographics ==
Per Japanese census data, the population of Mihama has declined in recent decades.

Historical population
Year	Pop.	±%
1970	13,157	—
1980	13,036	−0.9%
1990	13,222	+1.4%
2000	11,630	−12.0%
2010	10,563	−9.2%
2020	9,179	−13.1%

== History ==
Mihama is part of ancient Wakasa Province. During the Edo period, the area was part of the holdings of Obama Domain. Following the Meiji restoration, it was organised into part of Mikata District in Fukui Prefecture. With the establishment of the modern municipalities system on April 1, 1889, the villages of Kitasaigō, Minamisaigō, Mimi, and Santō were established. The four villages merged to form the town of Mihama on February 11, 1954.

On August 9, 2004, a non-radioactive steam leak killed five and burnt twelve others in the nearby Mihama Nuclear Power Plant; the high-pressure steam pipe lost 85% of its wall thickness and failed five days before its first inspection since 1976.

== Government ==
Mihama has a mayor-council form of government with a directly elected mayor and a unicameral town legislature of 14 members. Mihama, collectively with the city of Obama and town of Wakasa, contributes three members to the Fukui Prefectural Assembly. In terms of national politics, the city is part of the Fukui 2nd district of the lower house of the Diet of Japan.

== Economy ==
The economy of Mihama, previously dependent on commercial fishing and agriculture, is now very heavily dependent on the nuclear power industry. The closure of the Mihama Nuclear Power Plant since the 2011 Fukushima Nuclear Disaster for ten years has crippled the local economy. The plant reopened in late 2022.

== Education ==
Mihama has three public elementary schools and one public middle school operated by the town government. The town does not have a high school. There is a special education school for the handicapped operated by the Fukui Prefectural Board of Education.

== Transportation ==
=== Railway ===
- JR West - Obama Line
  - Mihama, Higashi Mihama

=== Highway ===
- Maizuru-Wakasa Expressway
- National Route 27

== International relations ==
- Shimen District, New Taipei City, Taiwan, friendship city

== Local attractions ==
Sunlight on the sea at Quartz Beach (Suishōhama, 水晶浜), Mihama

- Lake Suigetsu
- Mikata Five Lakes, a Ramsar site
- Wakasa Wan Quasi-National Park
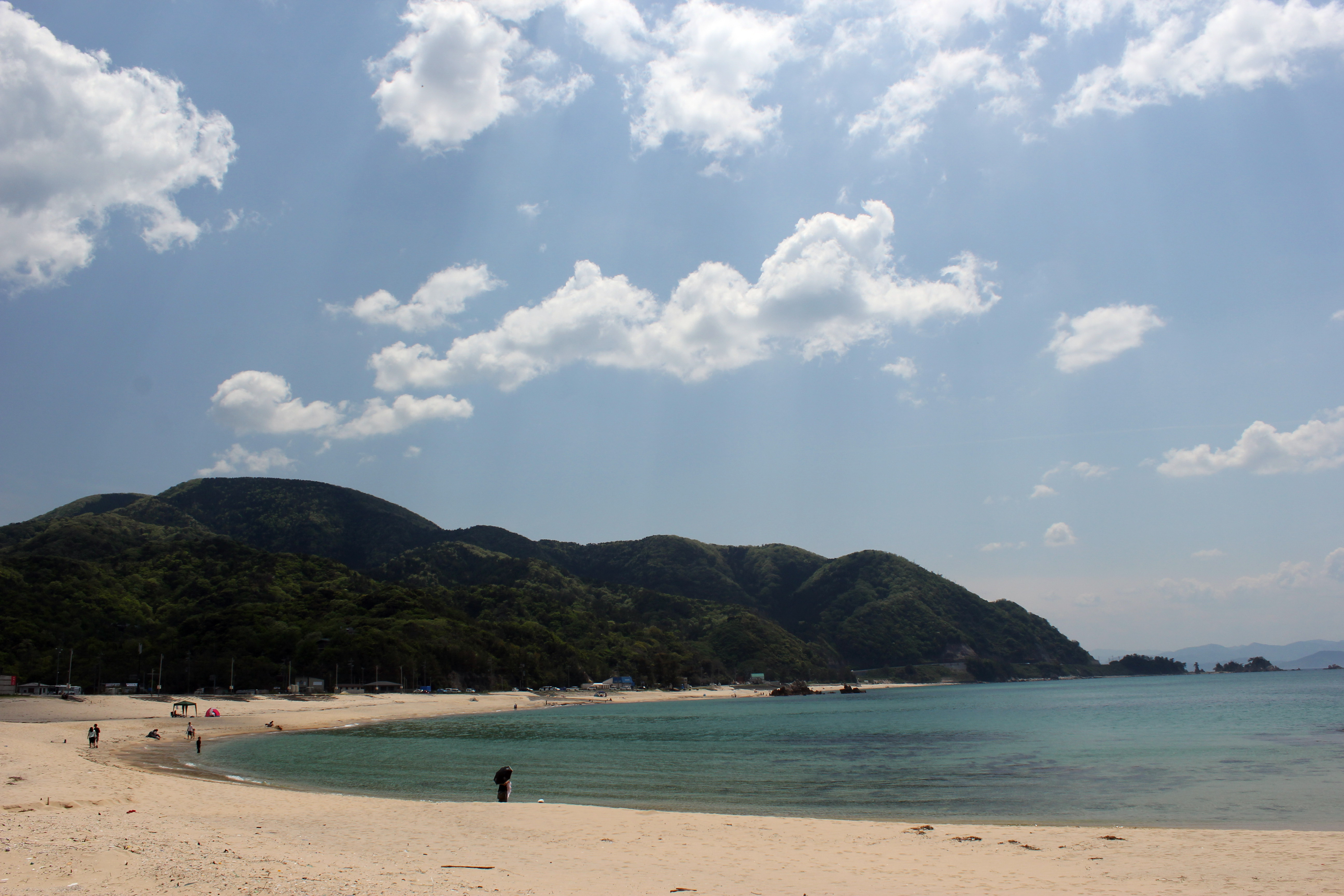
Suishohama beach

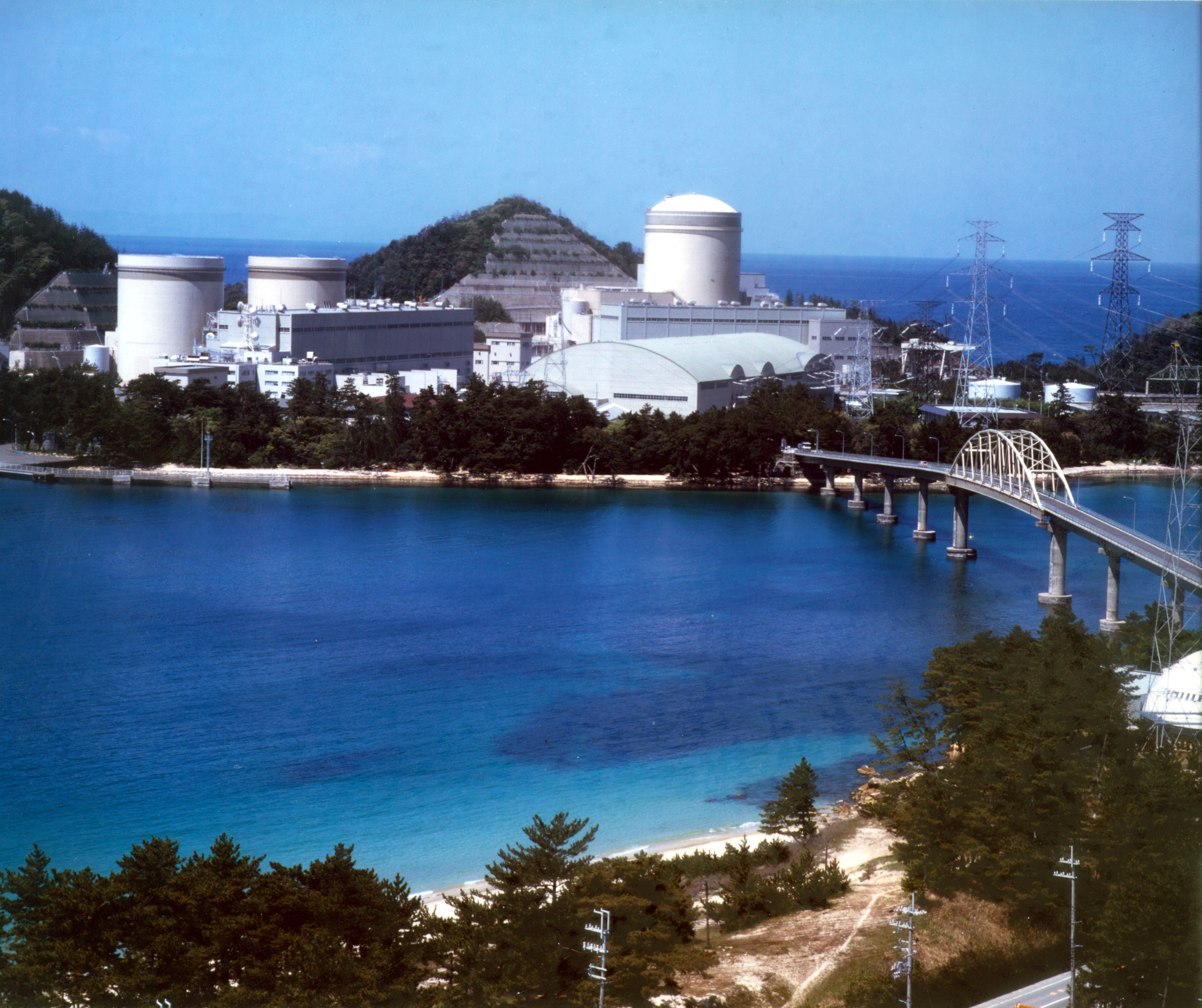
Mihama Nuclear Power Plant

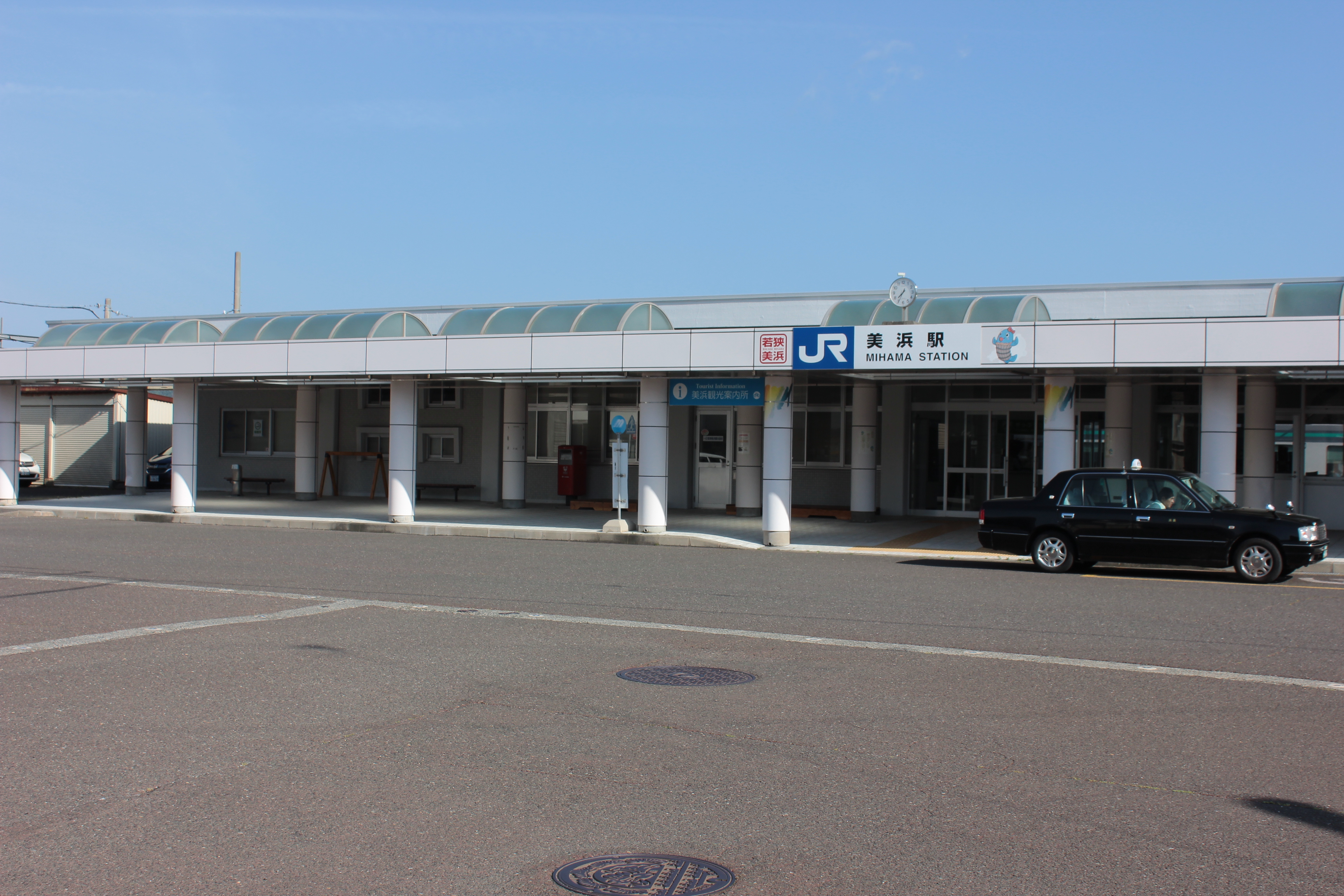
Mihama Station
