= Wakasa Mikata Jomon Museum =

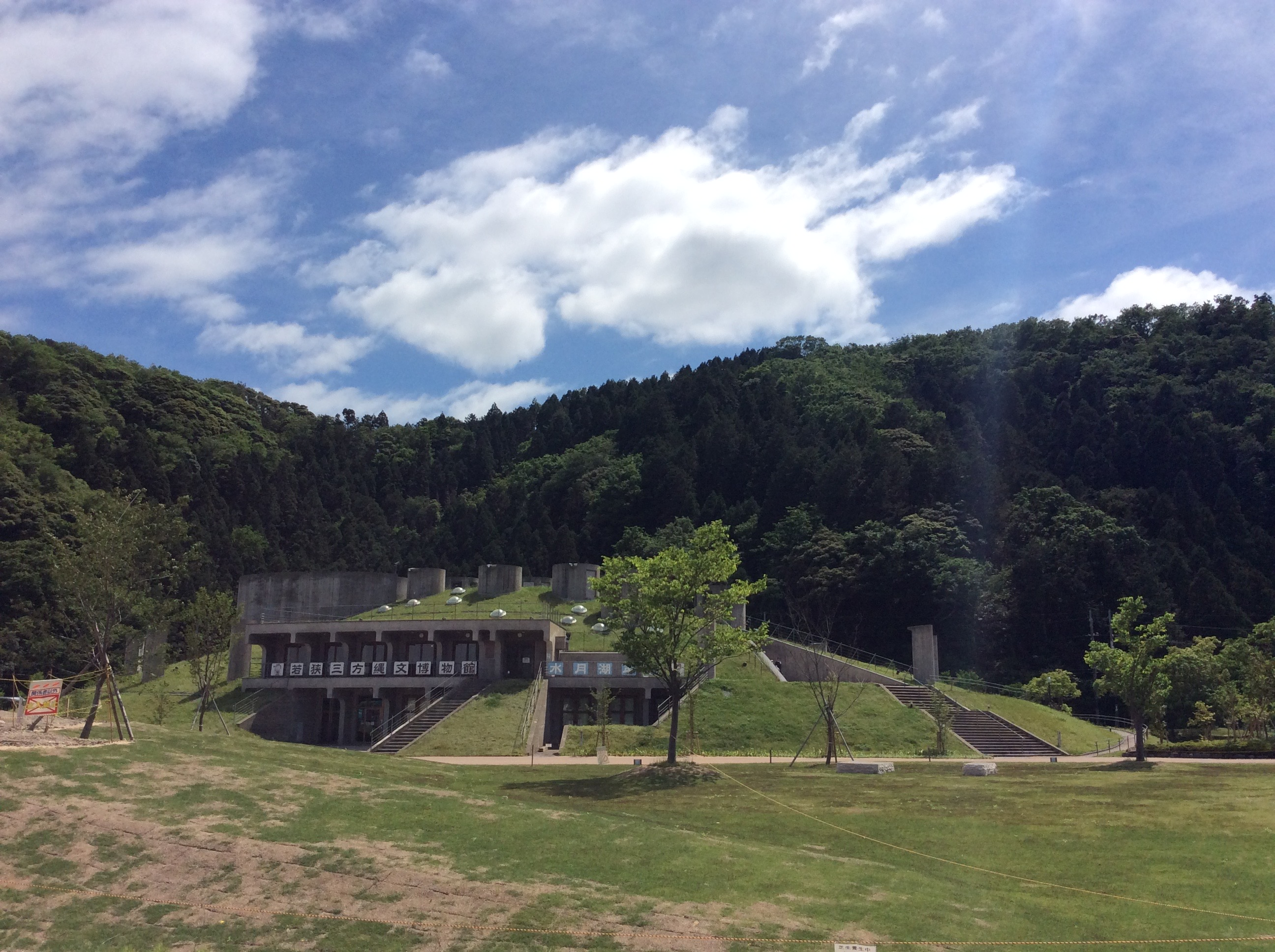

- Location of Wakasa Mikata Jomon Museum Wakasa Mikata Jomon Museum (Japan)
- Location: 122-121-1 Torihama, Wakasa, Mikatakaminaka, Fukui Prefecture
- Coordinates: 35.55875°N 135.896333°E
- Type: archeological museum
- Public transit access: JR West Obama Line Mikata Station
- Website: https://www.town.fukui-wakasa.lg.jp/jomon/index.html

Wakasa Mikata Jomon Museum (若狭三方縄文博物館) is an archeological museum located in the town of Wakasa, Fukui Prefecture, Japan. It is dedicated to the exhibition of Torihama shell mound as well as varve (annual layer pattern), oldest of which dating back to 70,000 years ago, discovered in the bottom of Lake Suigetsu, one of the Five Lakes of Mikata. The founding chairman is Takeshi Umehara.

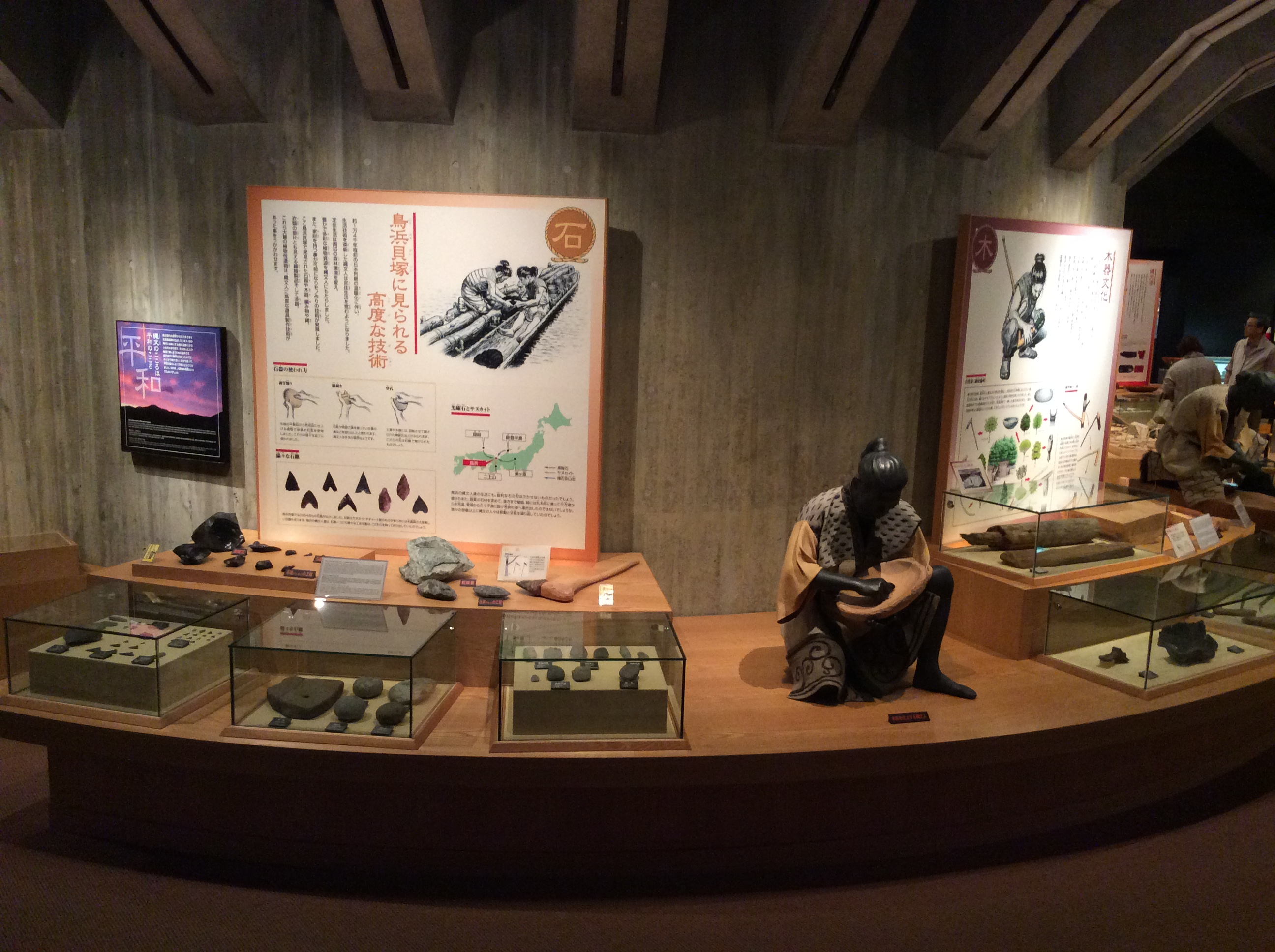
Interior view of Wakasa Mikata Jomon Museum

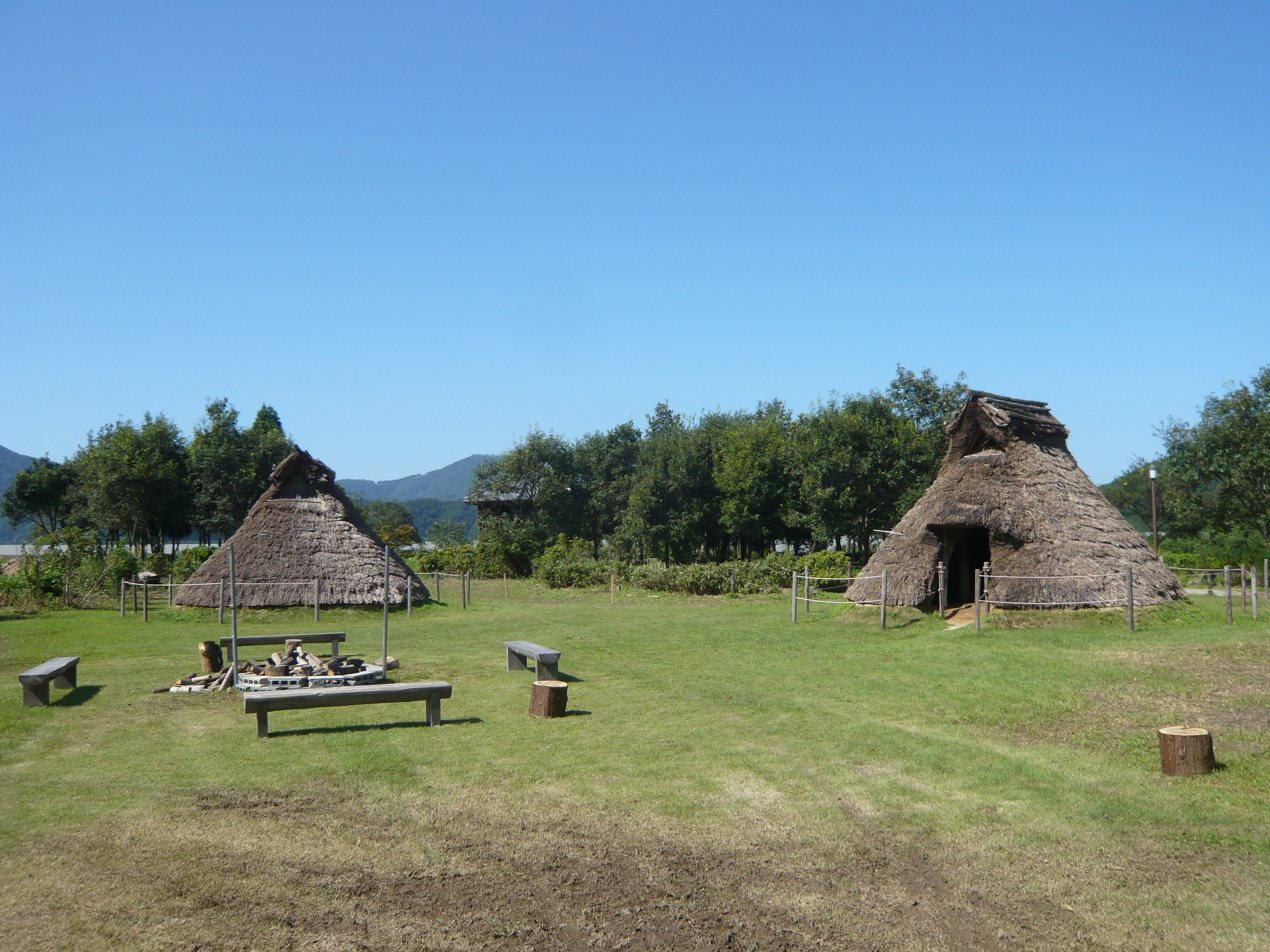
Reconstructed pit-house on exhibit outside of the museum.

== Activities ==
=== Permanent exhibition ===
Artifacts excavated from Torihama shell mound and others from the Jōmon period are on display. Central to the display is the stratigraphy of the mound. Other objects include a dugout canoe from the Yuri archeological site and its reconstruction, Jōmon pottery from various locations, dogū (clay dolls), and buried trees. Also, research by Takeshi Nakagawa, the Chairman of Archeological Climate Research Center, Ritsumeikan University, is explained to the public. Lake Suigetsu Varve Research and Exhibition Center (provisional name) is scheduled to open in September 2018.

=== Visitor participation ===
Visitors can experience making a magatama, clay flute, or clay pottery. They can also experience fire-making and dugout canoe riding.

=== Public education ===
Lectures on Jomon period and on environmental archeology.

=== Outside exhibition ===
Reconstructed pit-house (access without charge).

== Access ==
Located near Lake Mikata, at the mouth of Hasu river.

- About a 20–25 minute walk or 10 min by rental bicycle from Mikata Station of JR Obama Line.
- Wakasa town bus Tsunegami-Mikata line for Tsunegami. 13 min ride to Jomon Roman Park where the museum is located.

== Open date ==
The Wakasa Mikata Jomon Museum is closed on Tuesday (except on holidays, in which case it is closed on Wednesday) and at the end and beginning of the year.
