= Shigeaki Hinohara =

Japanese physician (1911–2017)

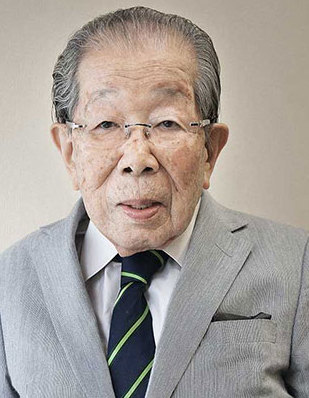
- Hinohara in July 2013
- Born: 4 October 1911; Yamaguchi, Japan
- Died: 18 July 2017 (aged 105); Tokyo
- Other name: 日野原 重明
- Occupation: Physician

Shigeaki Hinohara (日野原 重明, Hinohara Shigeaki; 4 October 1911 – 18 July 2017) was a Japanese physician. In 1941, he began his long working association with St. Luke's International Hospital in central Tokyo and worked as a medical doctor throughout the wartime firebombing of the city. From 1990 he served as the hospital's honorary director. He was also Sophia University's Grief Care Institute director emeritus. He was honorary chairman of the Foundation Sasakawa Memorial Health Cooperation. Hinohara is credited with establishing and popularizing Japan's practice of annual medical checkups.

== Biography ==
Hinohara was born in Yoshiki District, Yamaguchi Prefecture and graduated from the school of medicine at Kyoto Imperial University in 1937.

During his career Hinohara was known for working during many medical emergencies such as the firebombing of Tokyo during World War II and the Tokyo subway sarin attack. He was also on Japan Airlines Flight 351 when it was hijacked by the Japanese Red Army Faction.

Hinohara became an honorary member of the Japanese Cardiovascular Society and received the Second Prize and the Order of Culture. Kyoto Imperial University, Thomas Jefferson University and McMaster University honored him by conferring on him honorary doctorates.

Hinohara died on 18 July 2017 in Tokyo at the age of 105.

== See also ==
- List of centenarians (medical professionals)
- Michiko Chiura, a patient
