= Wakasa Wan Quasi-National Park =

Quasi-National Park in the Fukuo and Kyōto Prefectures of Japan

- 若狭湾国定公園
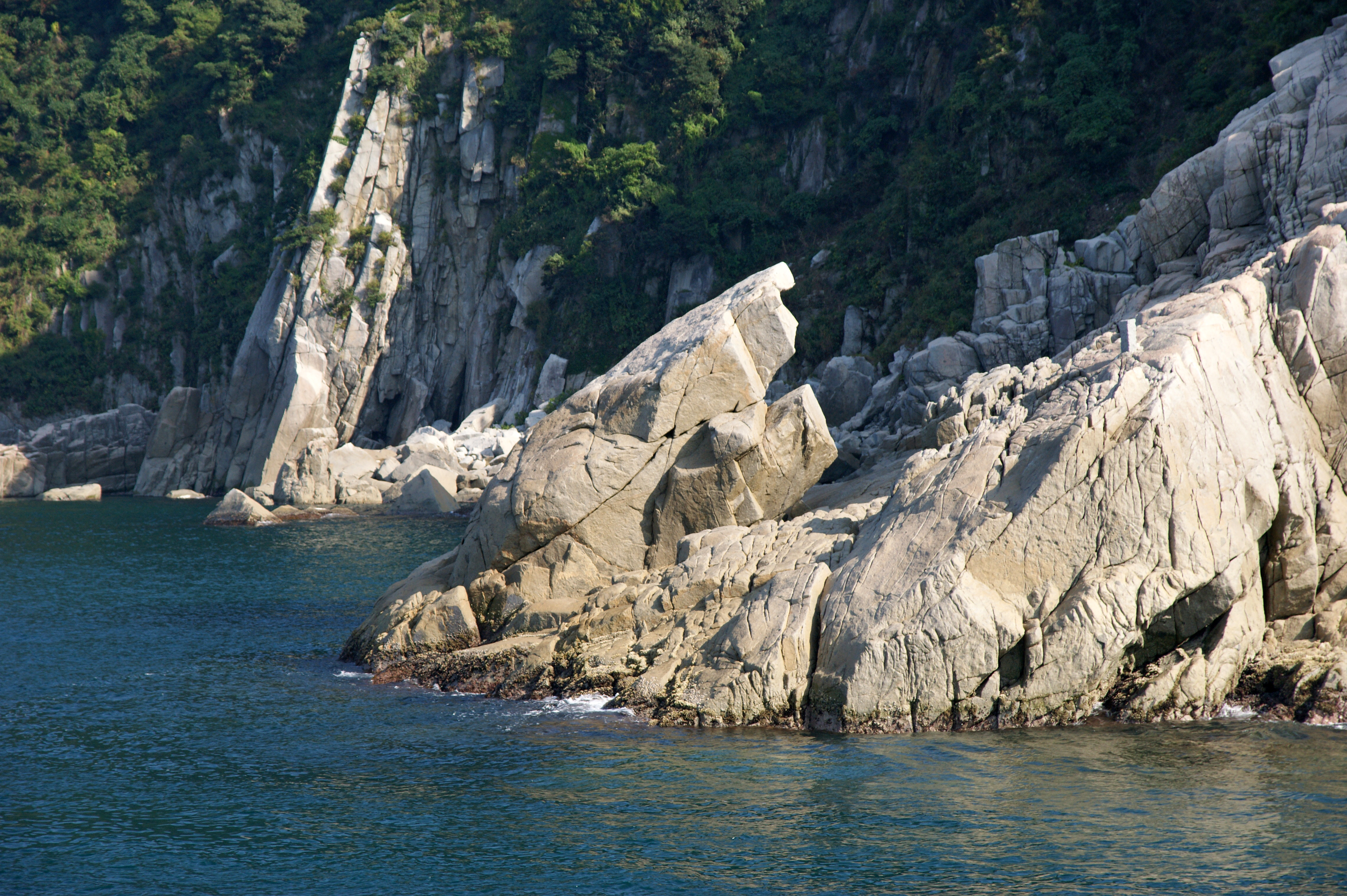
- Sotomo

- Location within Japan
- Location: Fukui/Kyōto Prefecture, Japan
- Coordinates: 35.51°N 135.67°E
- Area: 191.95 km^{2} (74.11 sq mi)
- Established: 1 June 1955

Wakasa Wan Quasi-National Park (若狭湾国定公園, Wakasa Wan Kokutei Kōen) is a Quasi-National Park in Fukui and Kyōto Prefectures, Japan. Established in 1955, the central feature of the park is the ria coast of Wakasa Bay. In 2005 an area of 11 km^{2} (4.2 sq mi) of wetland in the Mikata Lakes was designated a Ramsar Site.

== Sites of interest ==
- Kanmurijima, Kehi-no-matsubara (気比松原), Kutsujima (沓島), Mikata Five Lakes(三方五湖), Mount Aoba (青葉山), Sotomo (蘇洞門)
- Obama Bay

== Related municipalities ==
- Fukui: Mihama, Obama, Ōi, Takahama, Tsuruga, Wakasa
- Kyōto: Maizuru

== See also ==
- National Parks of Japan
- Ramsar Sites in Japan
