= Lake Suigetsu =

Lake in Wakasa, Japan

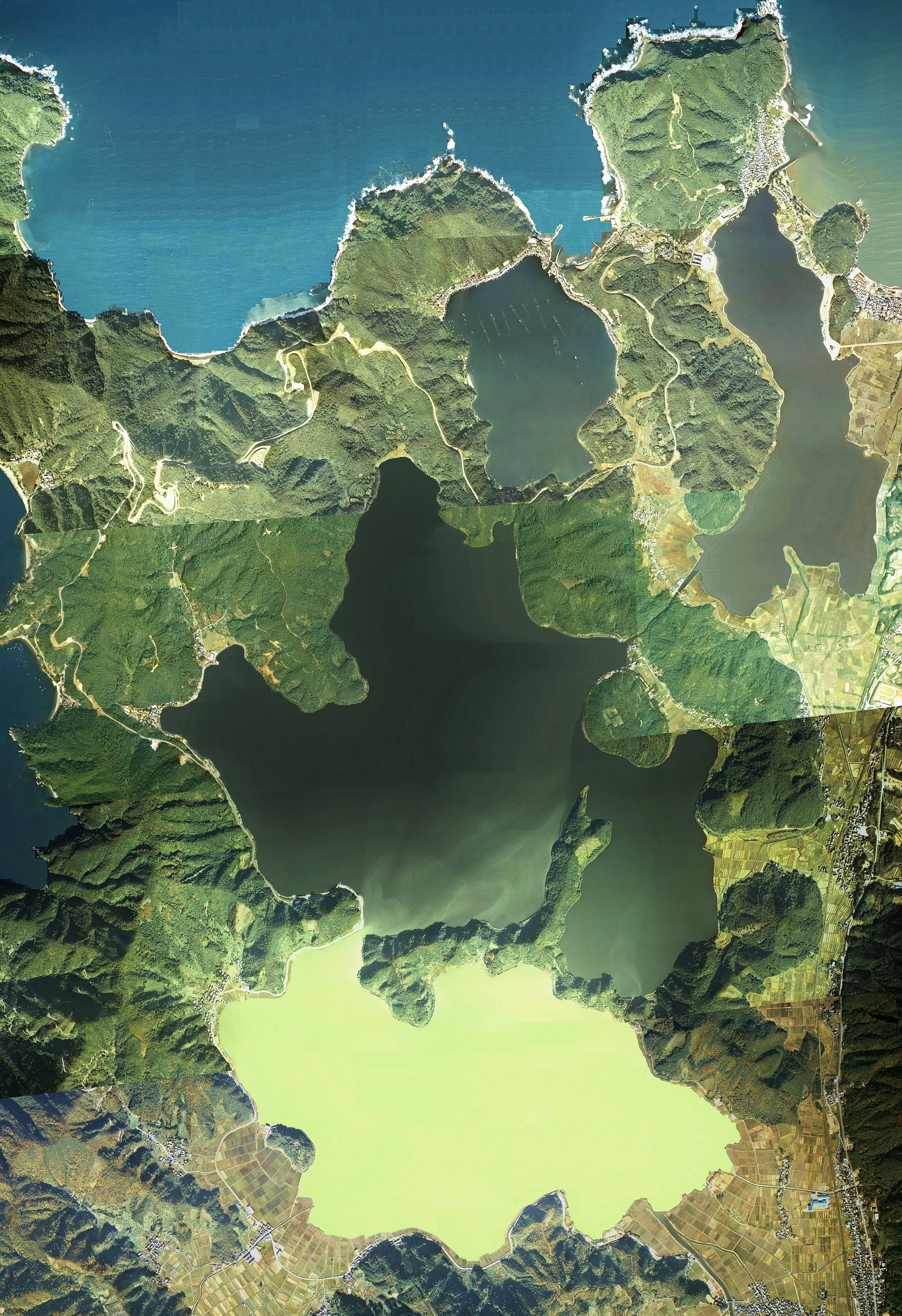
- Mikata five lakes; Lake Suigetsu is the largest one in the middle Made based on National Land Image Information (Color Aerial Photographs), Ministry of Land, Infrastructure, Transport and Tourism

- Location within Japan
- Location: Fukui Prefecture
- Coordinates: 35°35′N 135°53′E
- Type: tectonic
- Primary inflows: From the Hasu River via neighbouring Lake Mikata.
- Basin countries: Japan
- Max. length: 2 km (1.2 mi)
- Max. width: 2 km (1.2 mi)
- Surface area: 4.3 km^{2} (1.7 sq mi)
- Average depth: 34 m (112 ft)
- Surface elevation: 0 m (0 ft)
- Settlements: Wakasa, Fukui
- References: suigetsu project

Lake Suigetsu (水月湖, Suigetsu-ko) is a lake in the Hokuriku region of Honshu, Japan, which is one of the Mikata Five Lakes located in Mihama and Wakasa, Fukui Prefecture (west-central Honshu), close to the coast of the Wakasa Bay in the Sea of Japan. Since 1993, it has been attracting the attention of scientists because of the undisturbed nature of the water for many thousands of years. It is possible to identify the annual deposits of silt in a similar manner that tree rings are identified.

The area of the lakes is now part of the Wakasa Bay National Park.

== Mikata five lakes ==
All five lakes have different concentrations of salt. Lake Mikata is a fresh water lake, and Lake Hiruga contains ocean water. Lake Kugushi and Lake Hiruga are connected with Wakasa Bay.

The primary inflow of fresh water is from the Hasu River to Lake Mikata.

The size and the depth of the lakes are as follows,

- Lake Mikata: fresh water lake; area of 3.56 km^{2}, 5.8 m deep
- Lake Suigetsu: brackish water lake; area of 4.16 km^{2}, 34.0 m deep
- Lake Suga: brackish water lake; area of 0.91 km^{2}, 13.0 m deep
- Lake Kugushi: brackish water lake; area of 1.40 km^{2}, 2.5 m deep
- Lake Hiruga : ocean water lake; area of 0.92 km^{2}, 38.5 m deep

The lakes are all connected with channels or canals.

"Because Lake Kugushi opens into Wakasa Bay through a narrow and shallow river (Hayase River), seawater enters Lake Suigetsu periodically via Lake Kugushi during high tide."

Lake Suga may be seen as the eastern part of Lake Suigetsu, since the two are joined by a wide channel.

== Radiocarbon dating ==
The varves of Lake Suigetsu allow a chronology to be established, because of the leaf fragments embedded in them, which have been used to calibrate the Carbon-14 time scale beyond the range of the absolute tree-ring calibration. In late 2009, the journal Radiocarbon announced agreement on the INTCAL09 standard, which extends a more accurate calibration curve to 50,000 years. The results of research on varves in Lake Suigetsu, Japan announced in 2012 realised this aim. "In most cases the radiocarbon levels deduced from marine and other records have not been too far wrong. However, having a truly terrestrial record gives us better resolution and confidence in radiocarbon dating," said Christopher Bronk Ramsey. "It also allows us to look at the differences between the atmosphere and oceans and study the implications for our understanding of the marine environment as part of the global carbon cycle." Results were published in 2012 in the journal Science increasing the calibration from 12,593 to 52,800 years.

The only inflow to Lake Suigetsu is through a shallow channel from the neighbouring Lake Mikata and there is little outflow. Consequently, only the finest sediment comes into the lake. The water is anoxic (deoxygenated) preventing the growth of organisms and due to seasonal variations it is usually but not always possible to distinguish the annual deposits visually. It has taken almost twenty years to overcome the consequent problems, using multiple cores and new detection techniques to complete the sequence.

== See also ==
- Wakasa Wan Quasi-National Park
- Wakasa Bay
