= Ocho =

Ocho is the Spanish word for eight.

Ocho may also refer to:

- Ōchō, a Japanese era name
- Ocho, a figure "eight" in Argentine tango dance
- Mount Ōchō, a peak in Okuetsu Kōgen Prefectural Natural Park in Japan

== Media ==
- Ocho, an album by DLD
- "Ocho", a song by 2Face Idibia from the album Grass 2 Grace
- "Ocho", a song by Omar Rodríguez-López from the album Un Corazón de Nadie
- Ocho, a character in the television cartoon The Amazing World of Gumball
- The Ocho, the nickname of ESPN8, a fictional television network in the film Dodgeball: A True Underdog Story
- ESPN8 The Ocho, an annual sports programming segment on ESPN
- TSN The Ocho, a sports channel in Canada; see List of assets owned by Bell Media

== See also ==
- Canal Ocho (disambiguation), television channels numbered 8
- Calle Ocho, a street in Little Havana, Miami
- Ocho Rios, a town in Jamaica
- Otcho, a character in the 20th Century Boys manga series
- Otcho, the native name of the island of Bioko
- Oucho (disambiguation)
- Octo (disambiguation)
