= Oucho =

Oucho may refer to:

- Oucho T. Cactus, a puppet character operated and voiced by Warrick Brownlow-Pike as seen on the CBBC show Ed and Oucho's Excellent Inventions
- Oucho Sparks, an American music group from Chicago

== See also ==
- Ocho (disambiguation)
