= Fukui Prefecture =

Prefecture of Japan

Coordinates: 35°59′N 136°11′E

Fukui Prefecture 福井県
- Prefecture

Japanese transcription(s)
  - Japanese: 福井県
  - Rōmaji: Fukui-ken
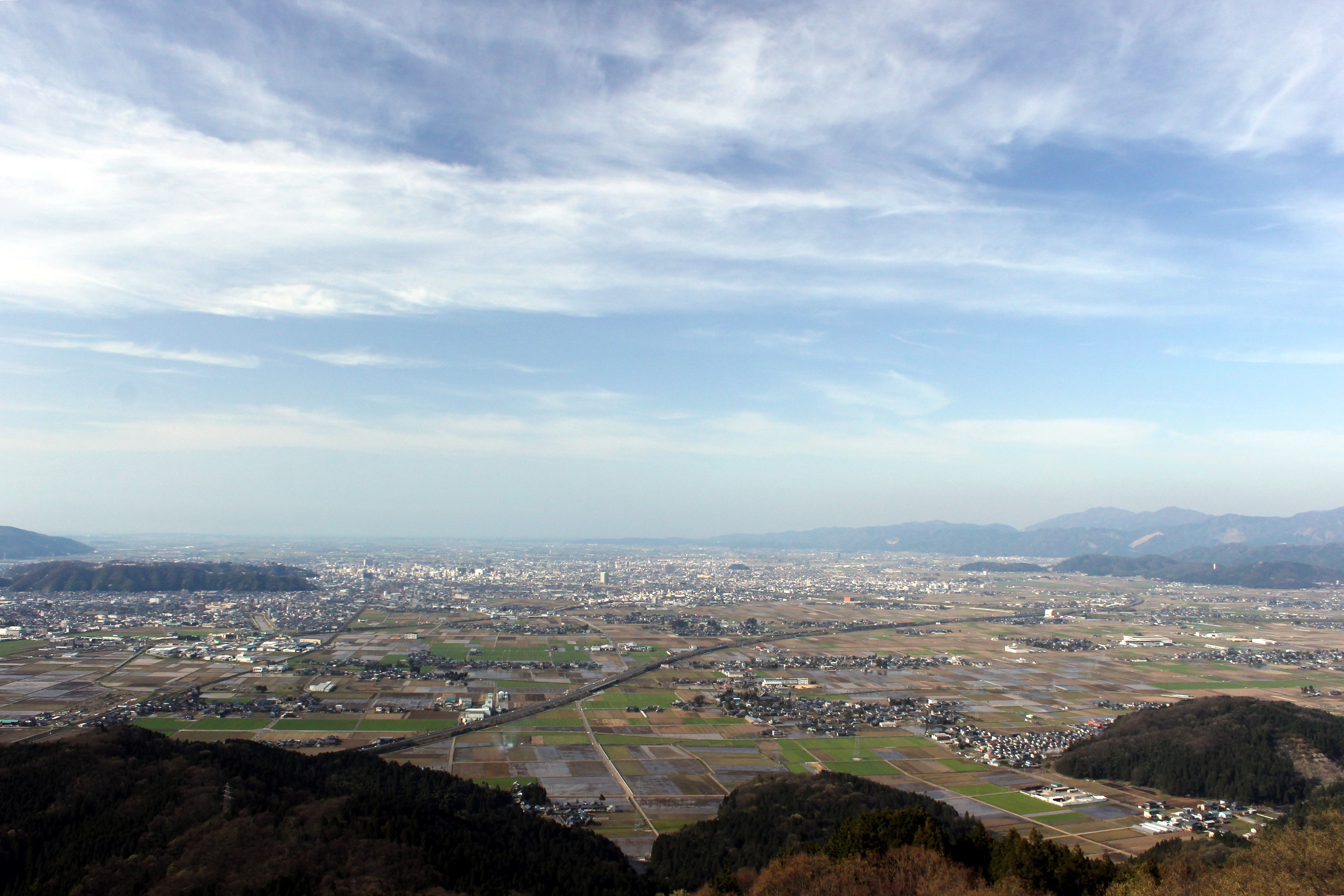
- Panoramic view of the Fukui plain, Fukui prefecture from the top of Monju

- Flag Symbol
- Anthem: Fukui kenminka
- Country: Japan
- Region: Chūbu (Hokuriku)
- Island: Honshū
- Capital: Fukui
- Subdivisions: Districts: 7, Municipalities: 17

Government
  - Governor: Takato Ishida

Area
  - Total: 4,190.49 km^{2} (1,617.96 sq mi)
  - Rank: 35th

Population (February 1, 2025)
  - Total: 736,855
  - Rank: 43rd
  - Density: 176/km^{2} (460/sq mi)

GDP
  - Total: JP¥3,494 billion US$25.9 billion (2022)
- ISO 3166 code: JP-18
- Website: www.pref.fukui.jp/english/
- Symbols of Japan
- Bird: Dusky thrush (Turdus naumanni)
- Flower: Narcissus (Narcissus tazetta)
- Tree: Pine tree (Pinus)

Fukui Prefecture (福井県, Fukui-ken; Japanese pronunciation: [ɸɯ̥̈.kɯ̈́ì, -kɯ̈́í, -kɯ̈̀ì, -kɯ̈́.í.kè̞ɴ̀, -kɯ̈́ì-]) is a prefecture of Japan located in the Chūbu region of Honshū. Fukui Prefecture has a population of 737,229 (1 January 2025) and has a geographic area of 4,190 km^{2} (1,617 sq mi). Fukui Prefecture borders Ishikawa Prefecture to the north, Gifu Prefecture to the east, Shiga Prefecture to the south, and Kyoto Prefecture to the southwest.

Fukui is the capital and largest city of Fukui Prefecture, with other major cities including Sakai, Echizen, and Sabae. Fukui Prefecture is located on the Sea of Japan coast and is part of the historic Hokuriku region of Japan. The Matsudaira clan, a powerful samurai clan during the Edo period that became a component of the Japanese nobility after the Meiji Restoration, was headquartered at Fukui Castle on the site of the modern prefectural offices. Fukui Prefecture is home to the Kitadani Formation and Kitadani Family, the Ichijōdani Asakura Family Historic Ruins, and the Tōjinbō cliff range.

== Prehistory ==
The Kitadani Dinosaur Quarry, on the Sugiyama River within the city limits of Katsuyama, has yielded animals such as Fukuiraptor, Fukuisaurus, Nipponosaurus, Koshisaurus, Fukuivenator, Fukuititan, and Tambatitanis, as well as an unnamed dromaeosaurid.

== History ==
Fukui originally consisted of the old provinces of Wakasa and Echizen, before the prefecture was formed in 1871.

During the Edo period, the daimyō of the region was surnamed Matsudaira, and was a descendant of Tokugawa Ieyasu.

During World War II, Fukui was heavily bombed and its palace, Fukui Castle, surrounded by a moat, was demolished. Buildings for the Fukui Prefectural government were built on the site of the castle.

== Geography ==
Fukui faces the Sea of Japan, and has a western part (formerly Wakasa) which is a narrow plain between the mountains and the sea, and a larger eastern part (formerly Echizen) with wider plains including the capital and most of the population. The province lies within Japan's "snow country".

Current map of Fukui Prefecture City Town

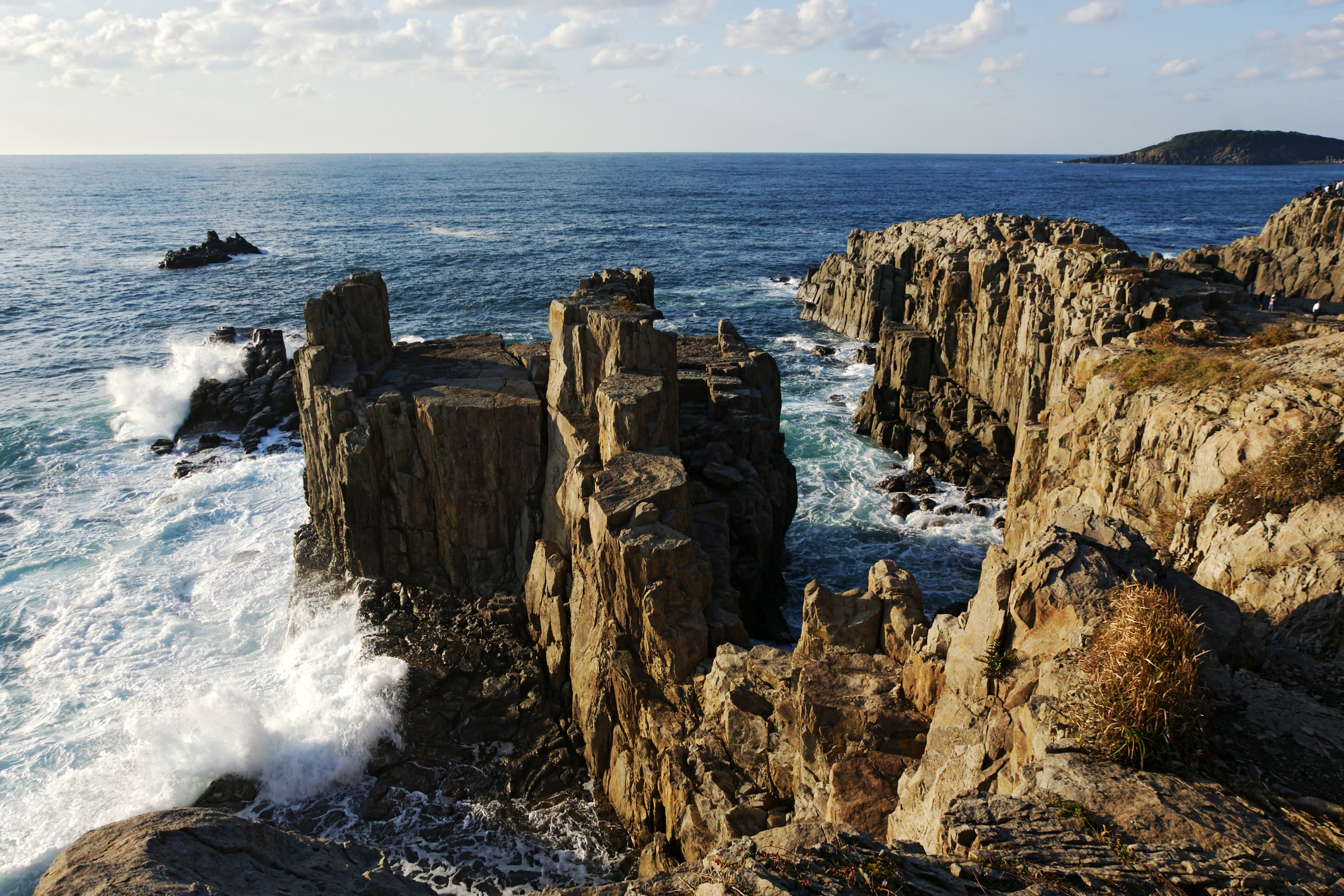
Tōjinbō, Sakai, Fukui

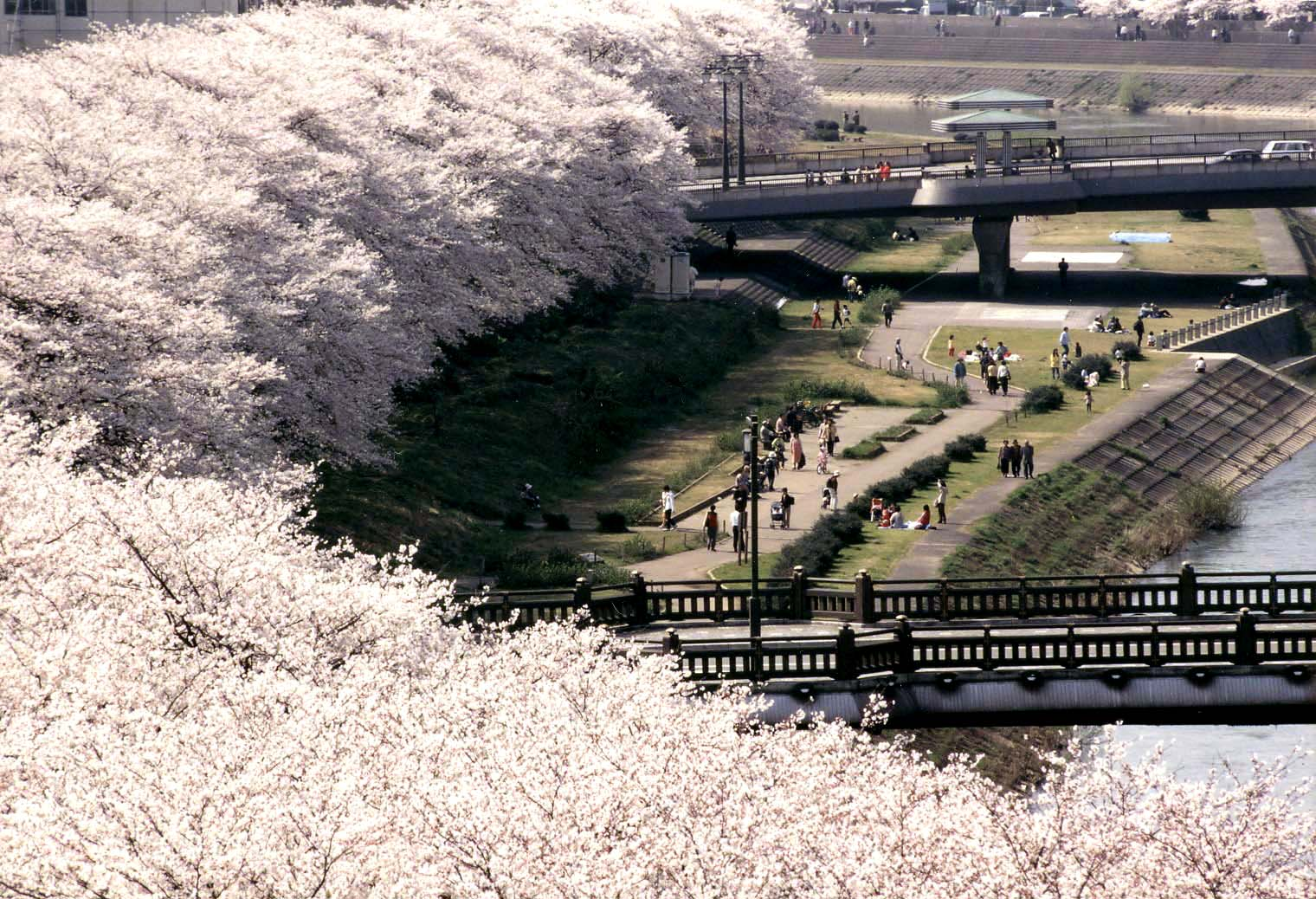
Row of sakura, Asuwa River, Fukui, Fukui

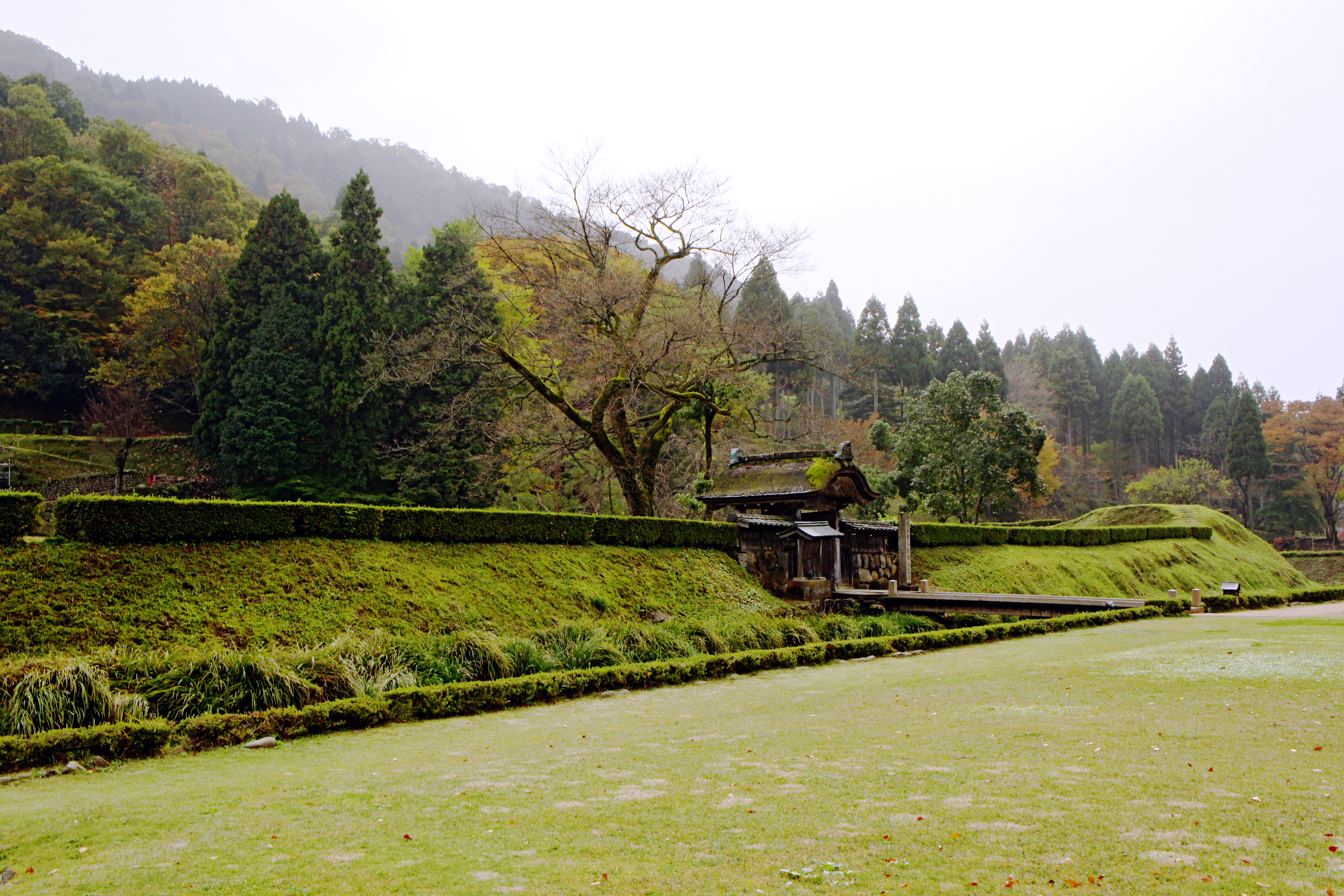
Ichijōdani Asakura Family Historic Ruins

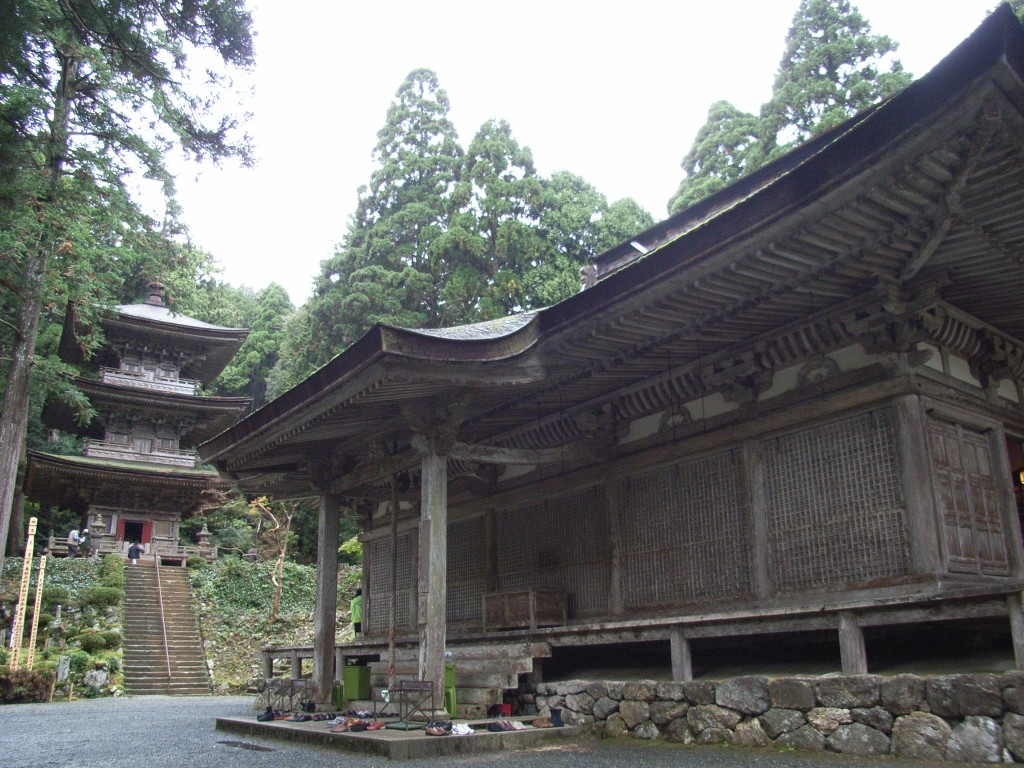
Myōtsū-ji, Obama, Fukui

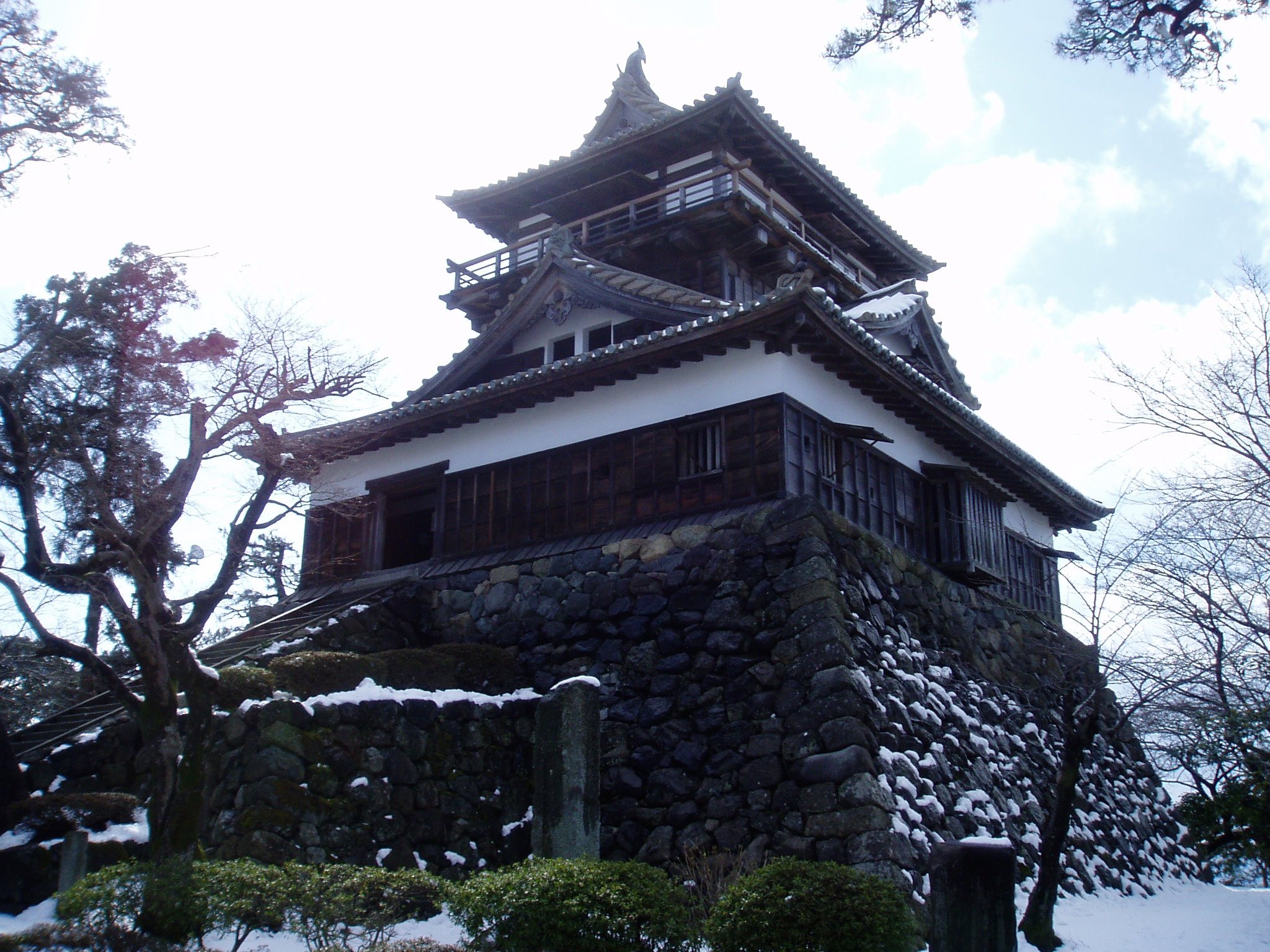
Maruoka Castle, Sakai, Fukui

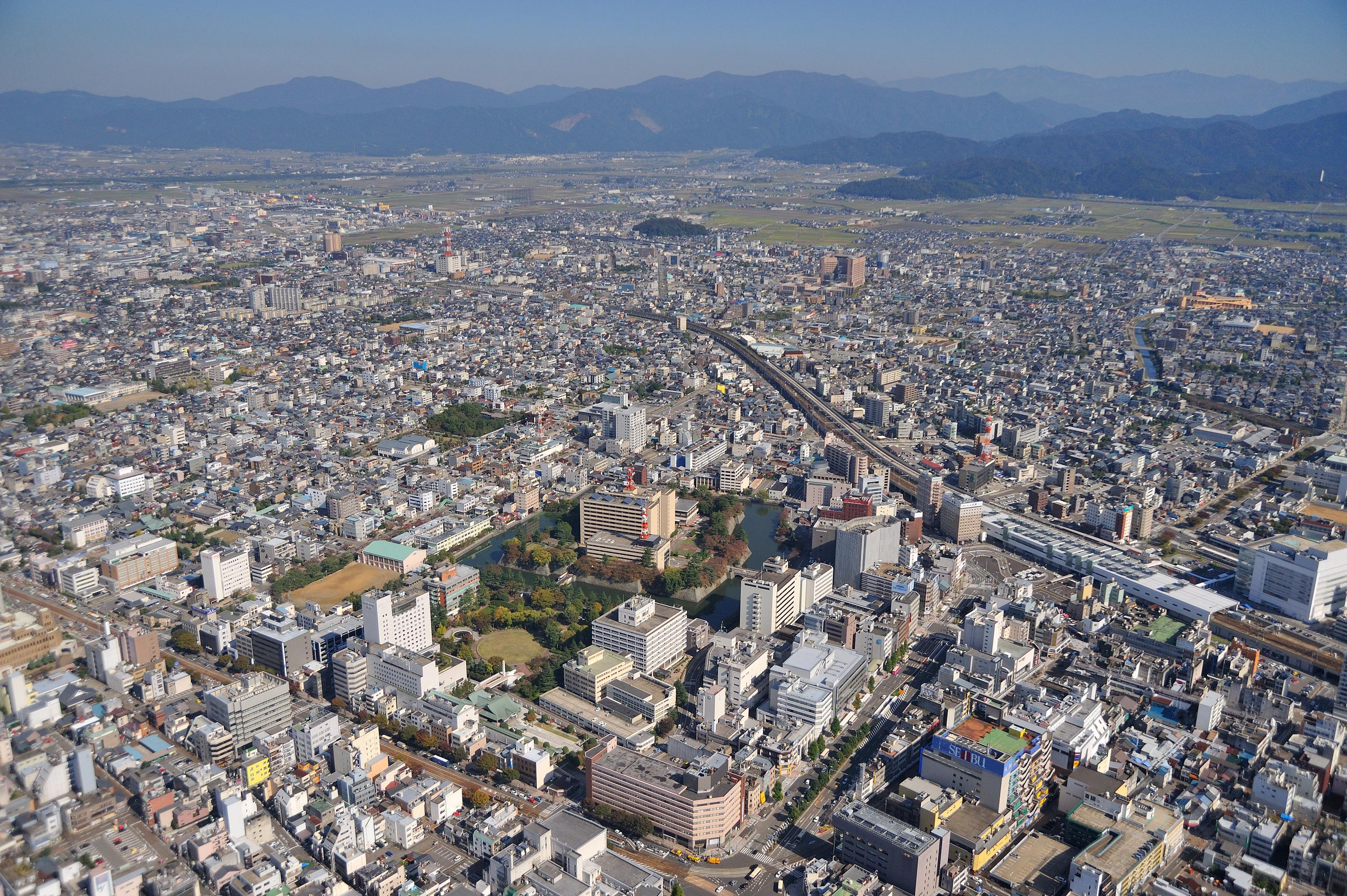
Fukui City

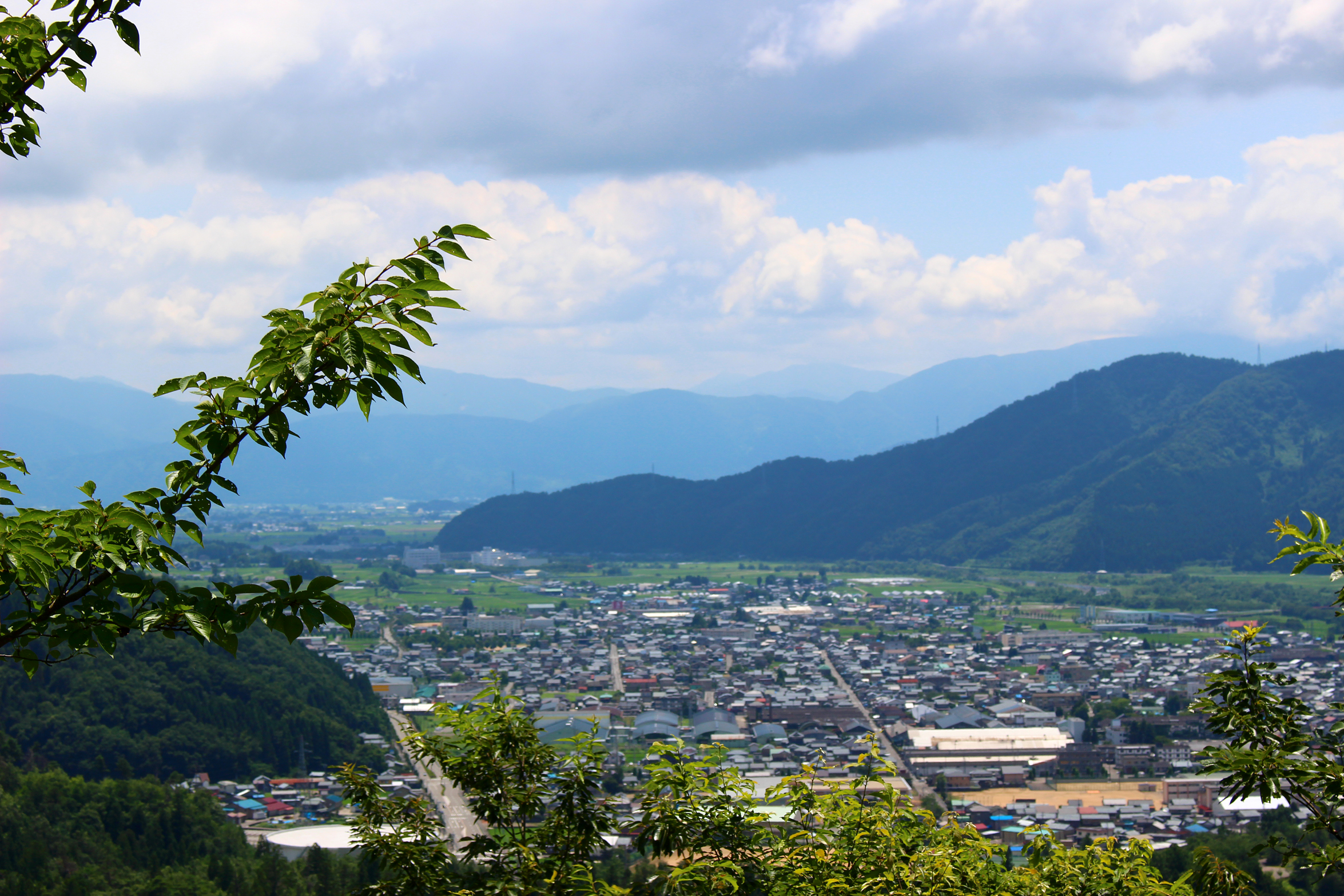
Katsuyama

As of 31 March 2008, 15% of the total land area of the prefecture was designated as Natural Parks, namely the Hakusan National Park; Echizen-Kaga Kaigan and Wakasa Wan Quasi-National Parks; and Okuetsu Kōgen Prefectural Natural Park.

=== Cities ===
Nine cities are located in Fukui Prefecture:

Name		Area (km^{2})	Population	Map
Rōmaji	Kanji	Area (km^{2})	Population	Map
Awara	あわら市	116.98	28,405	
Echizen	越前市	230.7	83,078	
Fukui (capital)	福井市	536.41	264,217	
Katsuyama	勝山市	253.88	23,527	
Obama	小浜市	233.09	29,435	
Ōno	大野市	872.43	33,640	
Sabae	鯖江市	84.59	69,338	
Sakai	坂井市	209.67	92,210	
Tsuruga	敦賀市	251.39	66,123	

=== Towns ===
These are the towns in each district:

Name		Area (km^{2})	Population	District	Map
Rōmaji	Kanji	Area (km^{2})	Population	District	Map
Echizen	越前町	153.15	20,709	Nyū District	
Eiheiji	永平寺町	94.43	18,746	Yoshida District	
Ikeda	池田町	194.65	2,628	Imadate District	
Mihama	美浜町	152.35	9,643	Mikata District	
Minamiechizen	南越前町	343.69	10,745	Nanjō District	
Ōi	おおい町	212.19	8,102	Ōi District	
Takahama	高浜町	72.4	10,490	Ōi District	
Wakasa	若狭町	178.49	14,577	Mikatakaminaka District	

== Economy ==
- Sabae is known for producing 90% of Japan's domestically made glasses.
- There are several nuclear power plants located along Wakasa Bay in Tsuruga which supply power to the Keihanshin metropolitan region. Fukui has 14 reactors, the most of any prefecture.

== Demographics ==
Fukui prefecture population pyramid in 2020

Historical population
Year	Pop.	±% p.a.
1920	599,155	—
1925	597,899	−0.04%
1930	618,144	+0.67%
1935	646,659	+0.91%
1940	643,904	−0.09%
1945	724,856	+2.40%
1950	752,374	+0.75%
1955	754,055	+0.04%
1960	752,696	−0.04%
1965	750,557	−0.06%
1970	744,230	−0.17%
1975	773,599	+0.78%
1980	794,354	+0.53%
1985	817,633	+0.58%
1990	823,585	+0.15%
1995	826,996	+0.08%
2000	828,944	+0.05%
2005	821,592	−0.18%
2010	806,314	−0.37%
2015	786,740	−0.49%
2020	766,863	−0.51%
Source: Censuses

Fukui is one of the less populated prefectures of Japan; in September 2015 there were an estimated 785,508 people living in 281,394 households. As seen in most of Japan, Fukui is facing the problem of both an aging and decreasing population; 28.6% of the population was over the age of 65 in July 2015 and the population has decreased by 2.6% from the 806,000 measured in the October 2010 national census.

== Culture ==
- Ichijōdani Asakura Family Historic Ruins is one of the most important cultural heritage sites in Japan.
- Eihei-ji is a temple offering training and education to Buddhist monks. Founded by Dogen Zenji in 1244, Eiheiji is located on a plot of land covering about 33 hectares.
- Myōtsū-ji's Three-storied Pagoda and Main Hall are National Treasures of Japan.
- Fukui is home to Maruoka Castle, the oldest standing castle in Japan. It was built in 1576.
- Residents of Fukui Prefecture have a distinctive accent, Fukui-ben.
- Fukui has long been a center for papermaking in Japan (along with Kyoto). Its Echizen Papermaking Cooperative is a world-famous collection of papermakers making paper in the traditional Echizen style.
- Fukui is also renowned for its clean water and crops, which result in sake, rice, and soba noodles.
- In August 2010 Fukui launched its own dating website entitled Fukui Marriage-Hunting Café in hopes of helping the declining population growth of Japan increase. Couples who meet in the site and continue on to marry receive monetary aid from the government as well as gifts.

== Friendship cities ==
- Vihti, Finland
- Winsen (Luhe), Germany

== Education ==
=== University ===
- Fukui University
- Fukui University of Technology
- Fukui Prefectural University
- Jin-ai University

== Transportation ==
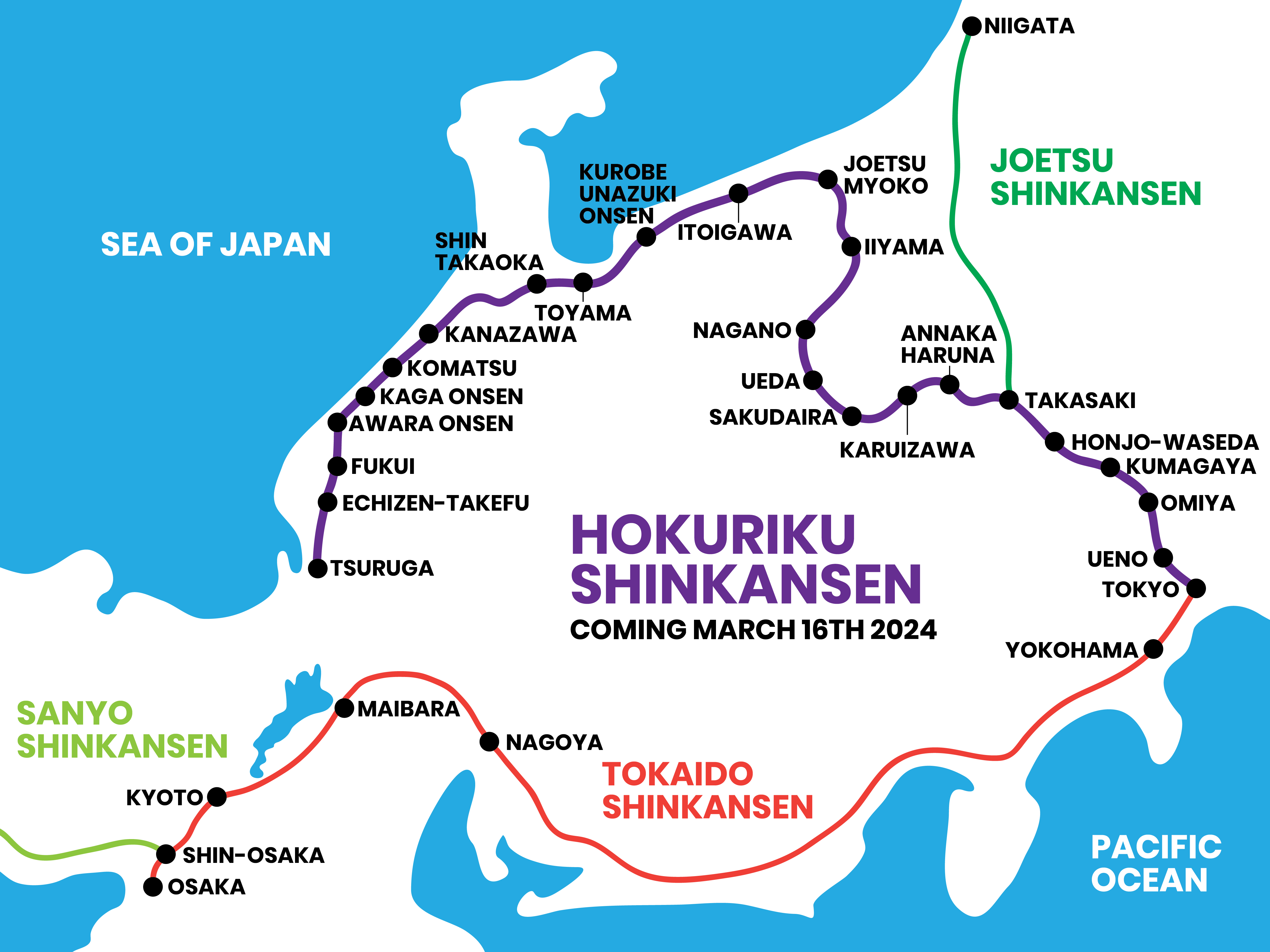
Map of Honshu, Japan, featuring Shinkansen (bullet train) lines.

=== Railroad ===
- Echizen Railway
  - Katsuyama-Eiheiji Line
  - Mikuni-Awara Line
- Fukui Railway
  - Fukubu Line
- Hokuriku Shinkansen
- JR West
  - Hokuriku Line
  - Kuzuryu Line
  - Obama Line
- Hapi-Line Fukui Line

=== Road ===
==== Expressways and toll roads ====
- Chubu Jukan Expressway
- Hokuriku Expressway
- Maizuru-Wakasa Expressway
- Mikata Lake Rainbow Road
- Mount Hoonji Toll Road

==== National highways ====
- Route 8
- Route 27
- Route 157
- Route 158
- Route 161
- Route 162
- Route 303
- Route 305
- Route 364
- Route 365
- Route 367
- Route 416
- Route 417
- Route 418
- Route 476

=== Port ===
- Fukui Port
- Tsuruga Port - Ferry route to Niigata, Akita, Tomakomai, Otaru and International container hub

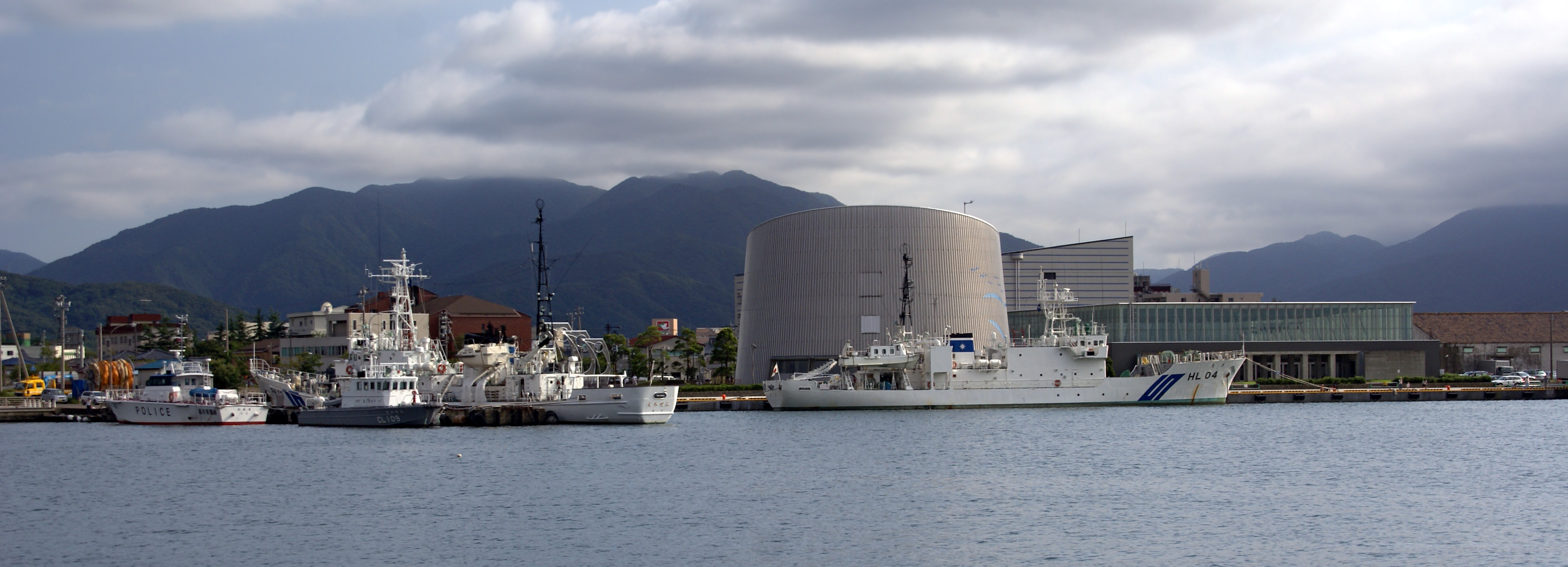
Tsuruga Port

== Tourism ==
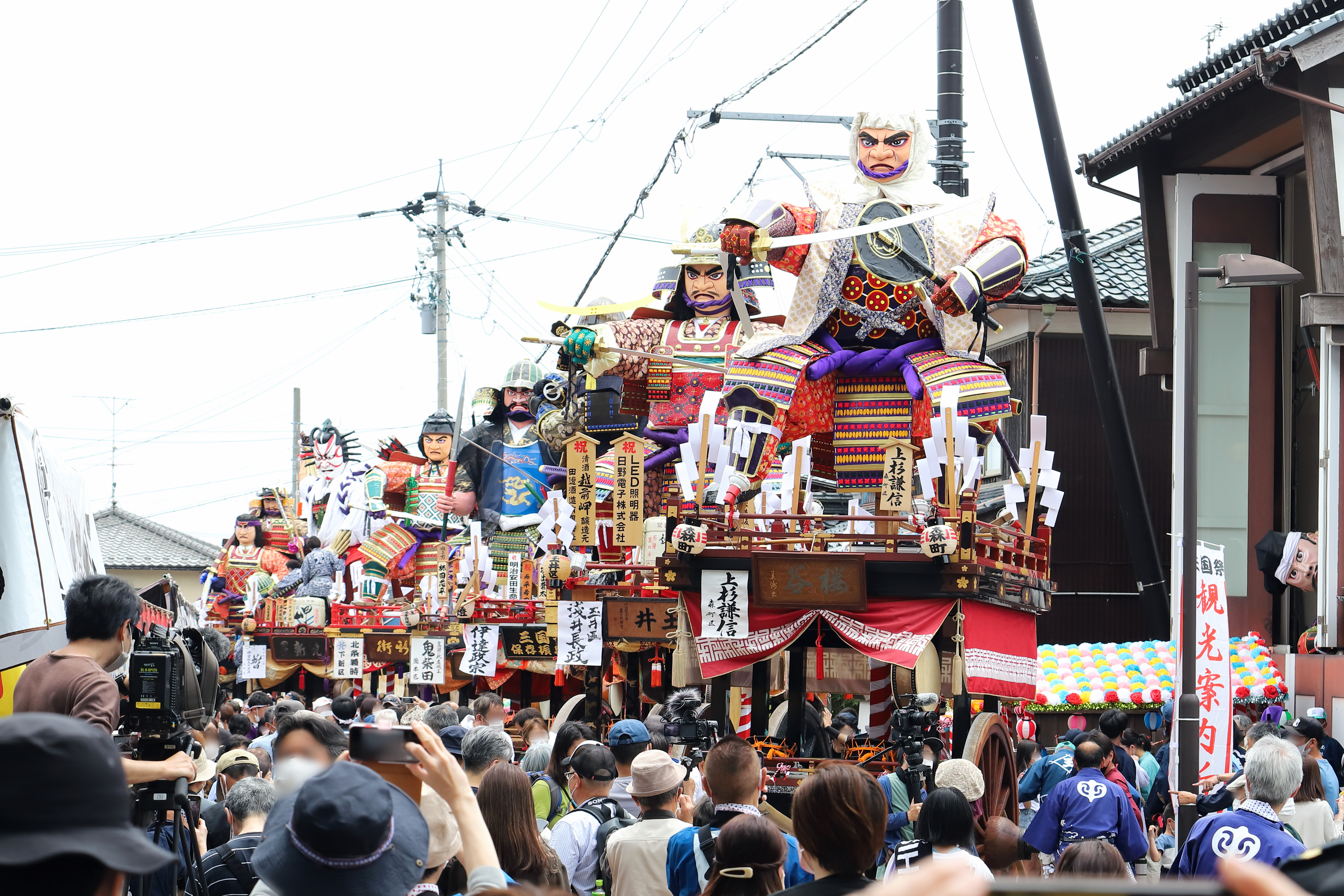
Mikuni Festival, one of the well known traditional festivals in Fukui Prefecture

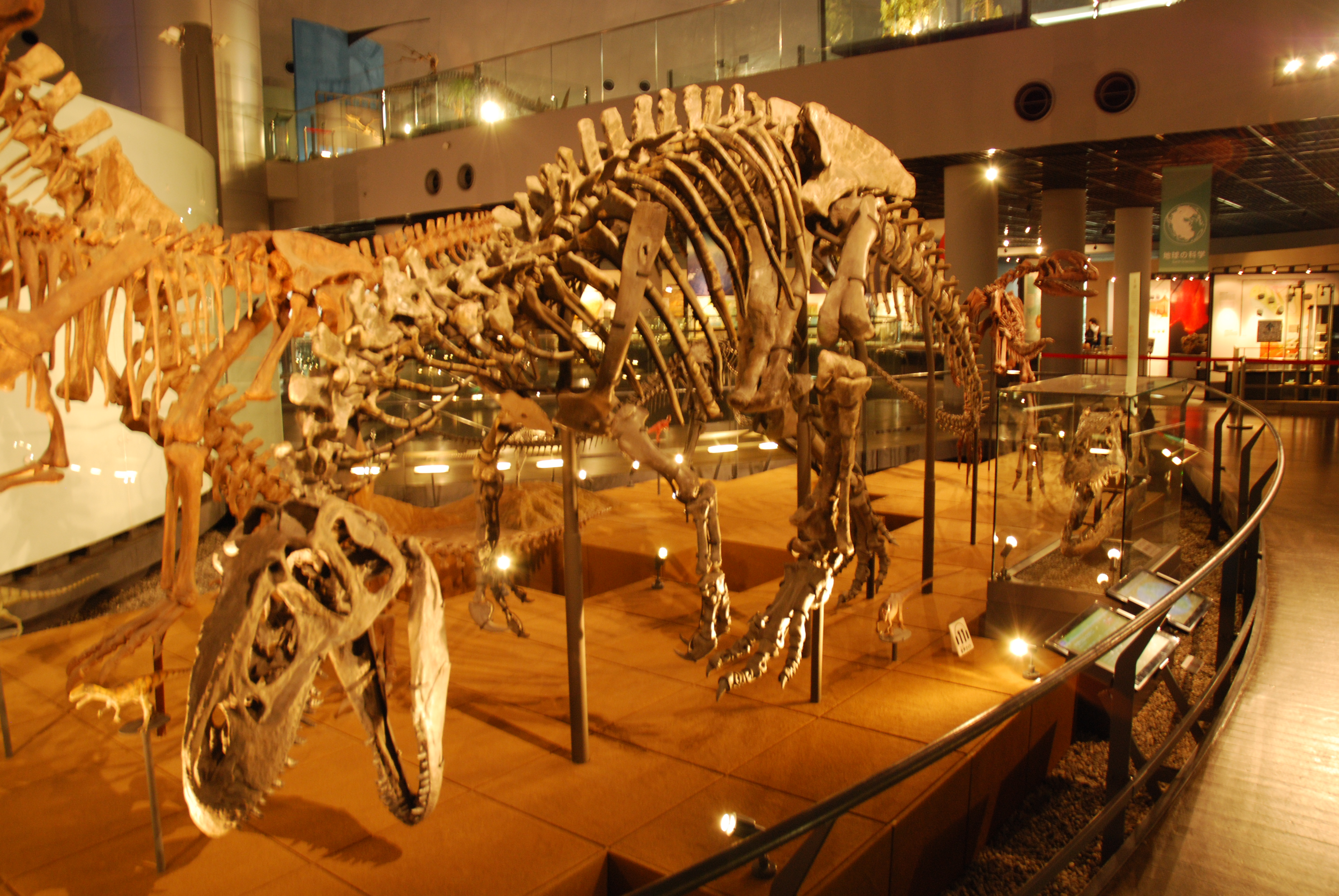
A skeletal show in Fukui Prefectual Dinosaur Museum

- Ichijōdani Asakura Family Historic Ruins
- Eihei-ji Temple
- Echizen Ono Castle
- Maruoka Castle
- Tōjinbō, a scenic piece of coastline, which is also a notorious spot for suicide.
- Echizen crabs are a local delicacy available year-round, though the crabbing season is during the winter.
- Another traditional sea-side Fukui dish is genge, a small guppy-like fish that when eaten raw as sashimi, gives the body a brief tingling sensation.
- Awara is a famous onsen in the north of the prefecture.
- Takefu Chrysanthemum Character Doll Exhibition, held in Takefu Central Park every October to November, first held in 1952.
- Mikuni Festival, a combined portable shrine and floats traditional festival during May every year, first held in 1697.
- Many dinosaur fossils have been excavated in Fukui and they can be seen at the Fukui Prefectural Dinosaur Museum in Katsuyama.
