= Trailokyavijaya =

Buddhist king of knowledge

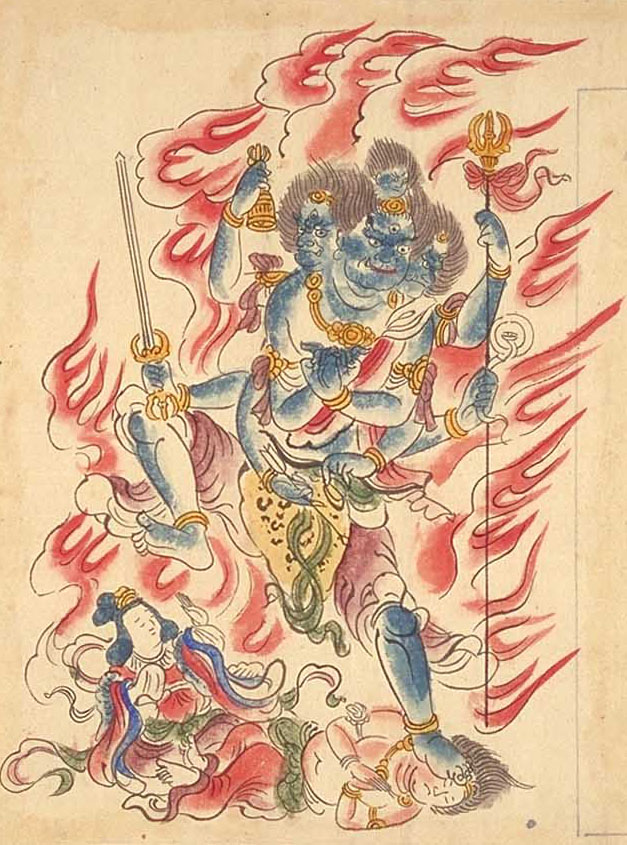
Trailokyavijaya tramples on Maheśvara and his consort as the great victor

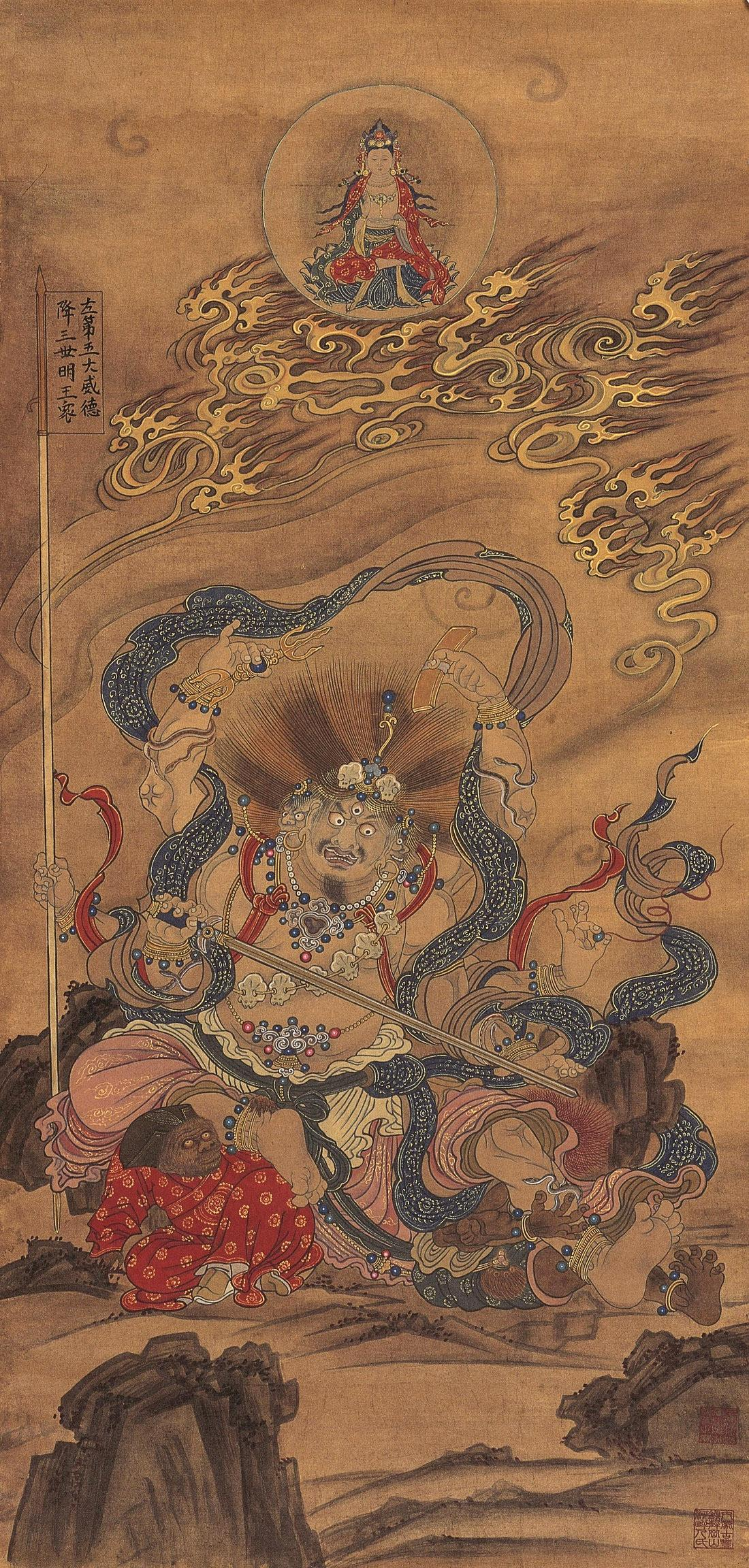
Ming dynasty (1368–1644) Shuilu ritual painting of Trailokyavijaya (Xiangsanshi Mingwang), one out of a set depicting the Ten Wisdom Kings, at Baoning Temple in Shanxi, China

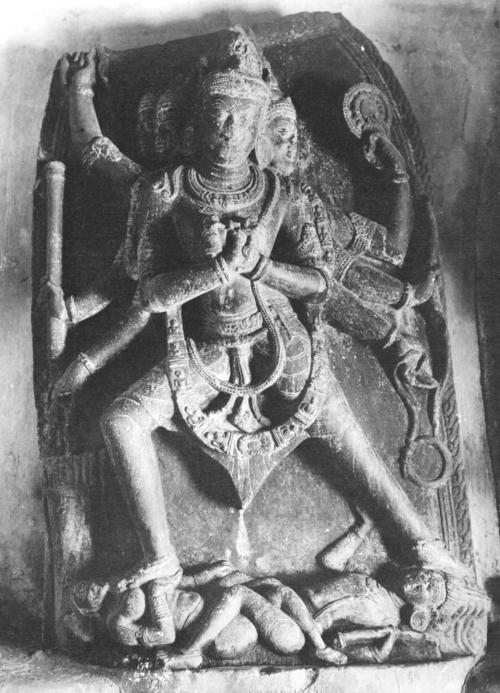
Sculpture of Trailokavijaya from Bodh Gaya, Bihar dated to the 8th to 12th century CE.

Trailokyavijaya (Chinese: 降三世明王; pinyin: Xiángsānshì Míngwáng, Japanese: Gōzanze Myōō; Korean: Hangsamse Myeongwang; Sanskrit: त्रैलोक्यविजय) is a Buddhist wrathful deity and one of the Wisdom Kings (Myōō). He is regarded as a fierce manifestation of the bodhisattva Vajrapāṇi and is counted among the Five Wisdom Kings (Godai Myōō), where he presides over the eastern direction as an incarnation of Akshobhya Buddha.

== Names and origins ==
The Sanskrit name Trailokyavijaya literally means “Conqueror of the Three Worlds,” signifying the “victor over Śiva, the ruler of the threefold world.” In Chinese, he is known as Xiangsanshi Mingwang. In Japanese he is known as Gōzanze Myōō (降三世明王), also called Gōzanze Yaksha Myōō or Shōzanze Myōō. Some esoteric texts refer to him as Sonba Myōō (孫婆明王), and in later Tantric Buddhism he is identified with Śumbharāja, linking him to the Asura brothers Śumbha (IAST: Śumbha) and Niśumbha (IAST: Niśumbha) of ancient Hindu mythology. With the rise of Esoteric Buddhism (Mikkyō), the figure of Trailokyavijaya was incorporated as a Buddhist protector.

== History ==
Trailokyavijaya features prominently in the seventh-century Tattvasaṃgraha Tantra, where Vajrapāṇi assumes his form. Worship of this deity in China began after the transmission of the Tattvasaṃgraha Tantra and the Vairocanābhisaṃbodhi Sūtra, translated into Chinese by the monk Amoghavajra in the late 8th century. In the Chinese Buddhist pantheon, Trailokyavijaya became known as Xiangsanshi Mingwang. He remains a key figure together with the other Ten Wisdom Kings during the Shuilu Fahui ceremony where they are invoked to the ritual space. Tantric texts featuring Trailokyavijaya were later introduced to Japan, where Trailokyavijaya eventually became known as Gōzanze Myōō and was incorporated into the Japanese esoteric pantheon.

== Role and legends ==
According to Buddhist legend, Gōzanze Myōō subdued Maheshvara (Śiva), the lord of the heavenly realms, and his consort Umā (Pārvatī), who refused to accept the Buddha’s teaching. Śiva and Pārvatī were worshiped as the supreme deities ruling past, present, and future, but Vairocana Buddha dispatched Gōzanze (or transformed into him) to convert them. By overpowering them, Gōzanze brought the Hindu cosmos under Buddhist law, giving rise to his name as the “Wisdom King who brought down the ruler of the three worlds.”

Buddhist narratives parallel the Hindu myth of Śumbha and Niśumbha found in the Mārkaṇḍeya Purāṇa, where the goddess Durga defeats the Asura brothers after a fierce war. In Buddhist adaptations, the bodhisattva Vajrapāṇi takes the form of an Asura using their mantras to subdue Śiva and Umā, trampling and then reviving them to convert them to the Dharma.

== Iconographic representation ==
Trailokyavijaya is typically depicted as a fierce blue deity born from the blue syllable Hūṃ, embodying the power of subjugation. He has four faces and eight arms, each face expressing a distinct emotion: the front shows passionate fury, the right wrathful compassion, the left disgust, and the rear heroic resolve. His main pair of hands forms the distinctive “Gōzanze mudra” while also bearing a bell and vajra, his chest inscribed with the mantra Vajra-hūṃ-kara. Of the remaining right hands, one holds a sword, another an elephant hook, and the third an arrow; the left hands hold a bow, a noose (lace), and a chakram. He carries, among other adornments, a garland made of a cord of Buddhas, is being developed as identical to him, that has (according fingers) magic gesture after touching fists back to back, attach two small chain-like fingers. The formula is "Om", etc. Most strikingly, Trailokyavijaya tramples the prostrate bodies of Maheshvara (Śiva) and Umā, symbolizing the subjugation of rival gods rather than demons.

== In mandalas ==
Trailokyavijaya appears in both the Mandala of the Two Realms (Kongōkai).

- In the Womb Realm, he and his counterpart Shōzanze Myōō appear in childlike bodhisattva form as Sonba Bosatsu and Nisonba Bosatsu.
- In the Diamond Realm, special assemblies are named after Gōzanze, making him the only Wisdom King to appear within the great circular hall of the mandala.

== Mantras ==
Several mantras are associated with Trailokyavijaya, including:

- Namaḥ samanta vajrāṇām. Ha ha ha vismaye, sarva tathāgata viṣaya sambhava Trailokya vijaya hūṃ jaḥ svāhā!
- Oṃ niṣombha vajra hūṃ phaṭ
- Oṃ śumbha niśumbha hūṃ gṛhṇa gṛhṇa hūṃ gṛhṇāpaya hūṃ ānaya ho bhagavan vajra hūṃ phaṭ

== Notable statues ==
- Tō-ji Temple, Kyoto – one of the Five Wisdom Kings, Heian period
- Myōtsū-ji Temple, Fukui – Heian period

== See also ==
- Chinese Esoteric Buddhism
- Shingon
- Vidyaraja
- Shuilu Fahui
- Shuilu ritual paintings
