= Myōtsū-ji =

Buddhist temple in Fukui Prefecture, Japan

- 明通寺
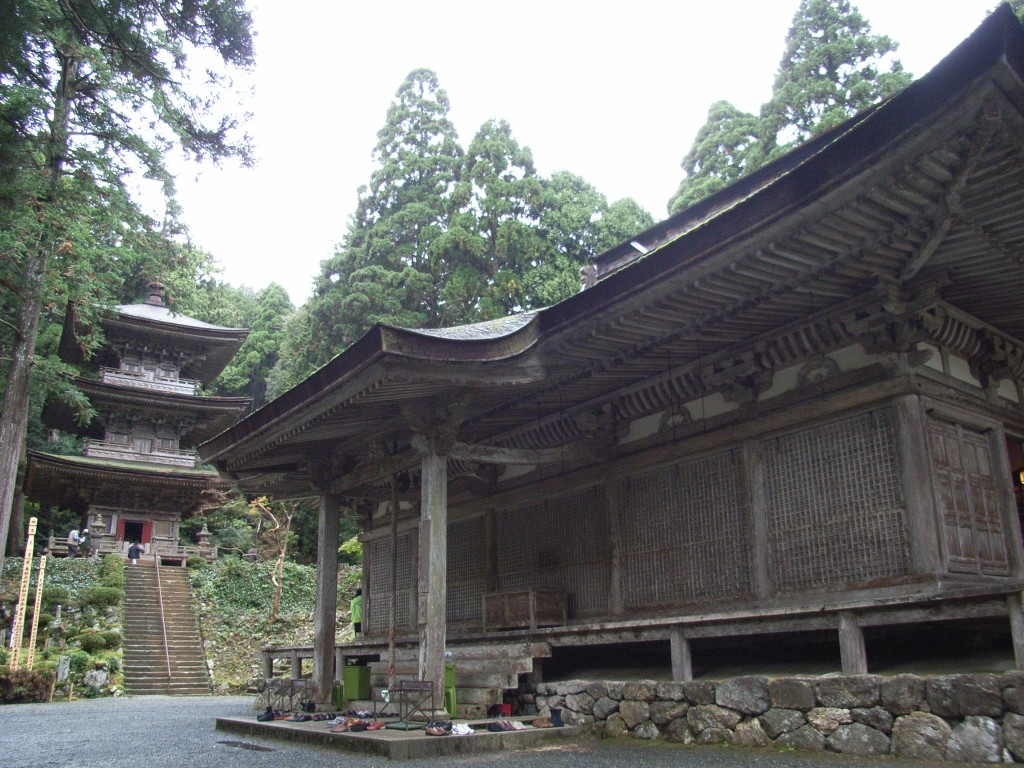
- Hondō and three-storey pagoda, National Treasures

- Location within Fukui Prefecture Location within Japan

Religion
- Affiliation: Buddhist
- Deity: Yakushi Nyorai
- Rite: Shingon
- Status: functional

Location
- Location: 5-22 Monzen, Obama-shi, Fukui-ken
- Country: Japan
- Interactive map of Myōtsū-ji
- Coordinates: 35°27′13″N 135°48′16″E

Architecture
- Founder: Sakanoue no Tamuramaro
- Completed: 806

Website
- Official website
- National Treasure National Important Cultural Property

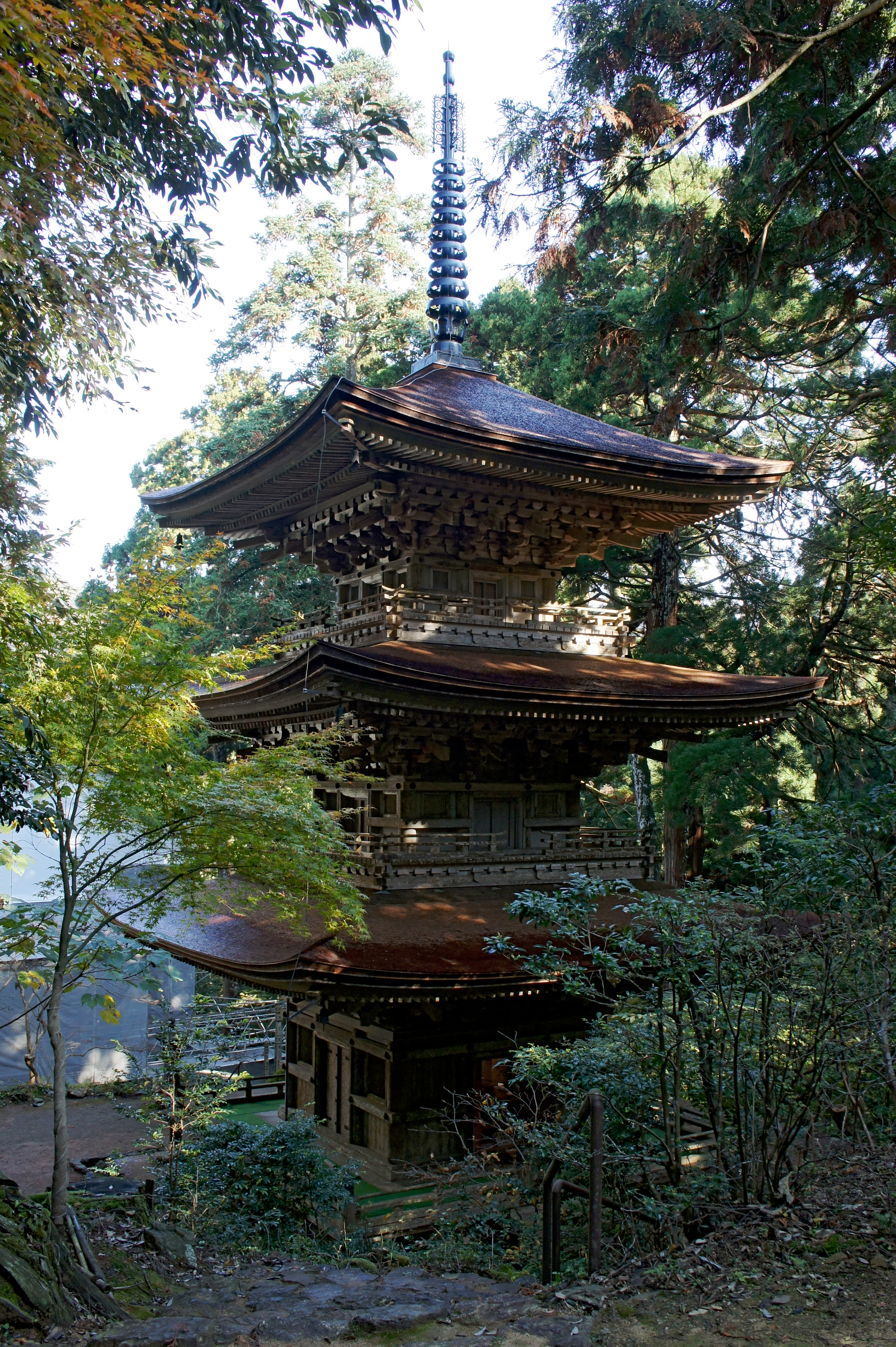
Myōtsū-ji Three-story pagoda (NT)

Myōtsū-ji (明通寺) is a Buddhist temple located in the city of Obama, Fukui Prefecture, Japan. It belongs to the Omuro-branch of the Shingon sect and its honzon is a statue of Yakushi Nyorai. Its sangō Its full name is 棡寺 明通寺 (Yuzurisan Myōtsū-ji).

== History ==
The foundation of Myōtsū-ji is uncertain. Per temple records dated 1374, the temple was founded by the famous general Sakanoue no Tamuramaro in 806. Two of the structures of the temple date to the Kamakura period: the Hondō and the three-storey pagoda and both are designated National Treasures. A number of Heian-period statues within these buildings are designated Important Cultural Properties. The temple also has a garden with a pond.

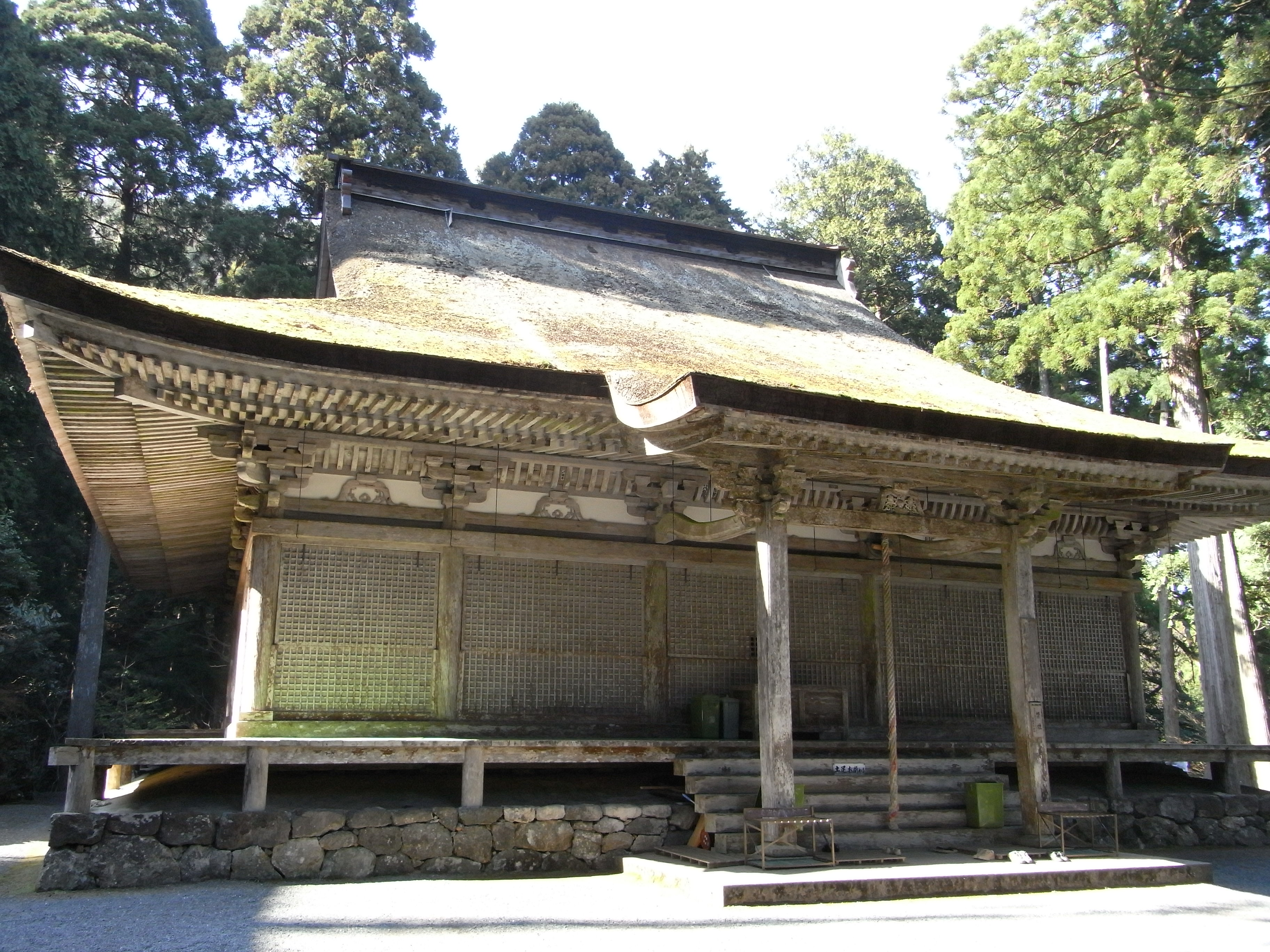
Hondō (NT)

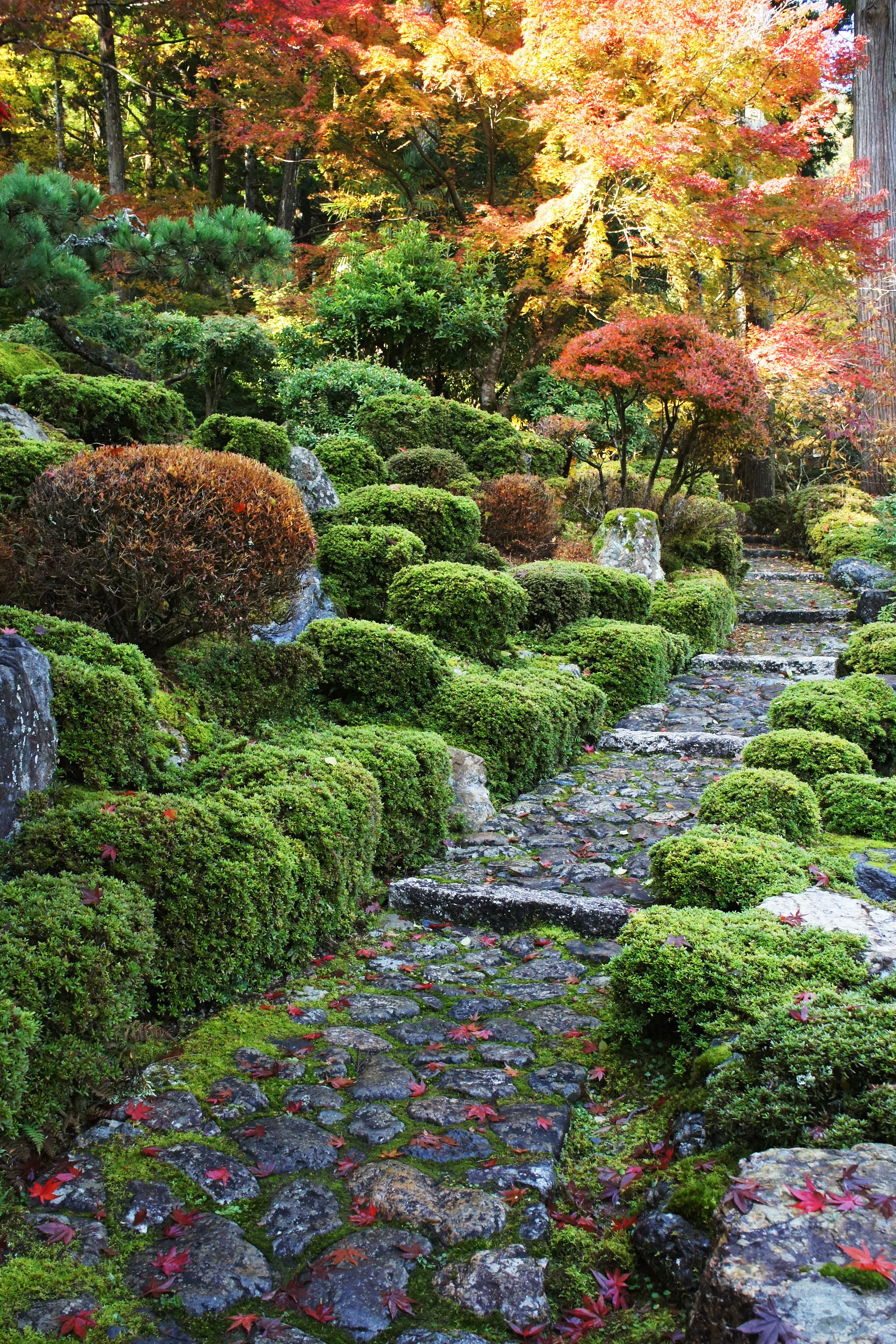
Gardens

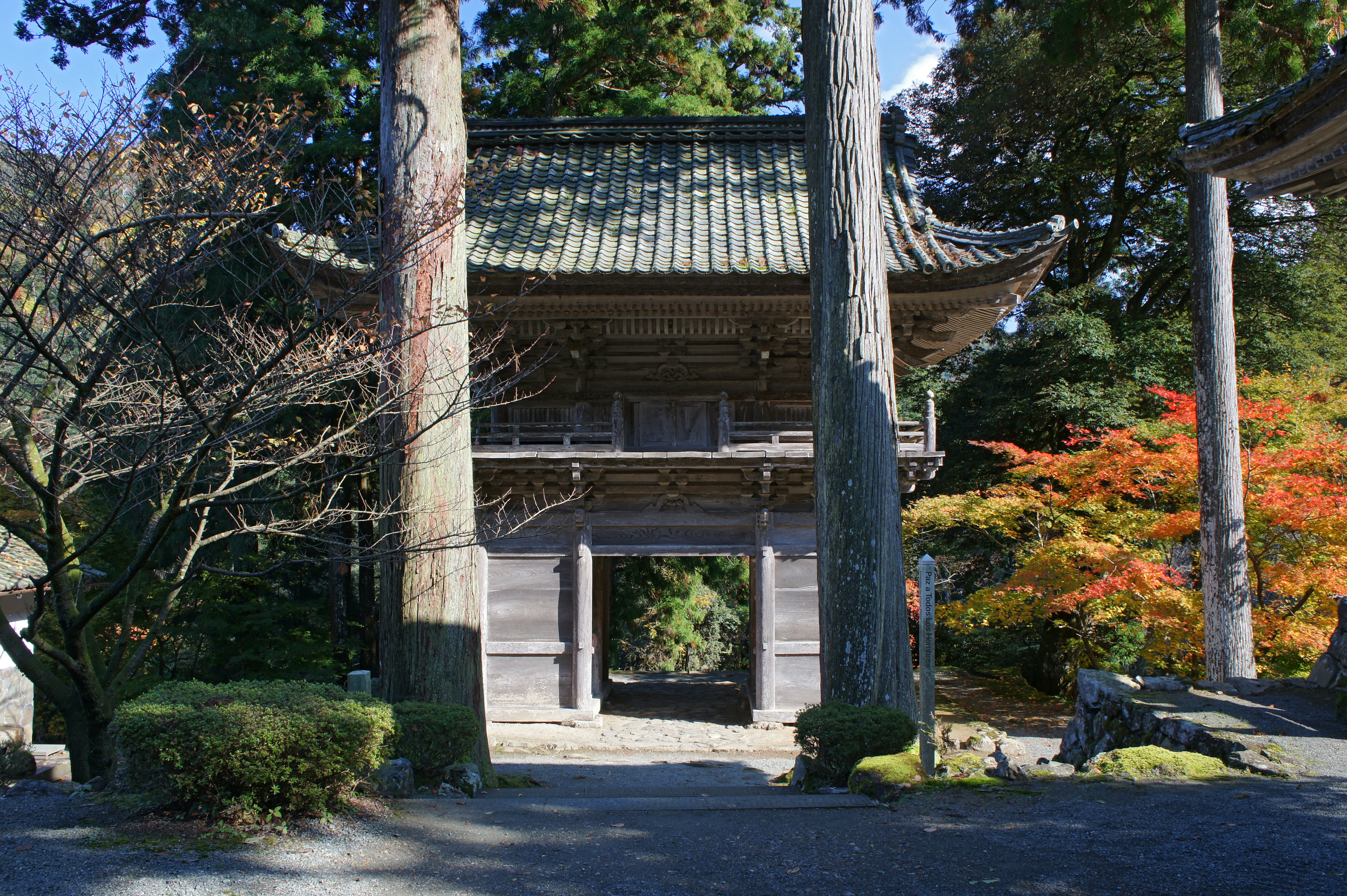
Sanmon

== Cultural Properties ==
=== National Treasure ===
- Hondō (本堂), Kamakura period (1258) . The building was completed between 1258 and 1265. Its gabled roof with hinoki cypress bark shingles (檜 皮 葺, Hiwada-buki) stand on a stone wall foundation. Its floor plan measures five bays wide and six bays deep. The entire front side is fitted with sliding doors, giving it a residential appearance. While based on a Japanese style, the interior structure incorporates Zen elements. The interior is clearly divided into an inner sanctuary and an outer sanctuary (prayer hall), a layout typical of medieval Buddhist temples. Records indicate that the inner sanctuary was expanded in 1799. It was dismantled and repaired in 1923. It is also referred to as the Yakushi-dō (薬師堂).
- Three-story pagoda (三重塔), Kamakura period (1270) . This building has a total height is 22.12 meters. While based on a Japanese style, the first story features kobushibana (fist-shaped decorative carvings on the ends of building materials), which are reminiscent of the "Daibutsu style" and are believed to be the oldest example of kobushibana on a pagoda. The interior of the first story is decorated with Shitenbashira (four pillars surrounding a Buddhist altar) and houses the Shaka Triad and Amida Triad. The pillars and walls are decorated with paintings of the Twelve Heavenly Kings, but these are not original. Repairs were carried out in 1539 and 1702. The roof was covered with tiles from 1894, but was restored to cypress bark during repairs in 1957.

=== National Important Cultural Properties ===
- Statue: Seated wooden Yakushi Nyorai (木造薬師如来坐像), late Heian period . This statue was created between the end of the Heian period and the beginning of the Kamakura period. It is 144.5-cm tall and made of yosegi-zukuri.
- Statue:Standing wooden Gōzanzei-Myōō (木造降三世明王立像), late Heian period . This statue dates from the late Heian period. It is 252.4-cm tall and made from a single piece of wood. It is placed on the right side of the main shrine, but it is not believed to be one of the original attendants, and it is possible that it was carved as one of a set of the Five Wisdom Kings.
- Statue: Wooden standing Jinja-taishō (木造深沙大将立像), late Heian period. This statue was made in the late Heian period. It is 256.6-cm tall and made of a single piece of wood. It is placed to the left of the principal image. It is depicted as a strange-looking guardian deity with a skull on its head and the head of a young girl around its stomach. In Japan, he is depicted in paintings as one of the Sixteen Guardian Deities, but sculptures are rare.
- Statue: Standing wooden Fudo Myōō (木造不動明王立像), late Heian period. Created in the late Heian period, the statue is 161.8-cm tall and made from a single piece of hinoki cypress wood. In 1872, the Jibutsu-do caught fire and the principal image of Fudo Myōō was lost, so this statue was donated from a temple called Haga-dera and enshrined there. It was originally enshrined at a temple called Shorin-ji, but when the temple fell into decline in the Meiji period, it was moved to Haga-dera.
- Myōtsū-ji Kishinbuta (明通寺寄進札), 396 items, Kamakura to Edo period (1309 to 1694). Records of donations of money, rice, etc. to Myōtsū-ji are written on boards and nailed to the beams inside the main hall as votive offerings. The wishes of the donors, such as praying for the souls of their parents, are inscribed on the boards. The form of the boards has changed over time, and there are not only rectangular boards with ink inscriptions, but also horse-shaped boards and ones with red writing on a black background.

=== Fukui Prefectural Tangible Cultural Properties ===
- Emaki: Color on silk: Hikohohodemi-no-mikoto (絹本著色 彦火火出見尊絵巻), 6 scrolls (Edo period) (Prefectural Cultural Property) This 32.4 by 5,076.1-cm picture scroll depicts the tale of Urashima Taro and Hoori, as seen in the myths of the Kojiki and Nihon Shoki. According to an entry for 1441 in the Kanmon Gyoki, the original copy of this scroll kept at Myōtsū, but was presented to Tokugawa Iemitsu by feudal lord Sakai Tadakatsu, who on that occasion created a copy for Myōtsū-ji by Kanō school artist Kanō Taneyasa. This picture scroll is thought to have been created when Sakai Tadakatsu was in his thirties, between 1634, when he was transferred to Wakasa Province, and 1651, when Iemitsu died.

== See also ==
- List of National Treasures of Japan (temples)
