= Octo =

Octo may refer to:

- The numeral prefix "octo-", from the Latin for the number eight
- Octo Telematics, a company that analyses driver behaviour for insurance companies etc.
- Octo (automobile), a French car of the 1920s
- Octo, a character in the Japanese manga series Monster Musume

== See also ==
- Okto, a TV channel in Singapore
