= Okuetsu Kōgen Prefectural Natural Park =

Japanese Natural Park

Coordinates: 36.06°N 136.62°E

- 奥越高原県立自然公園
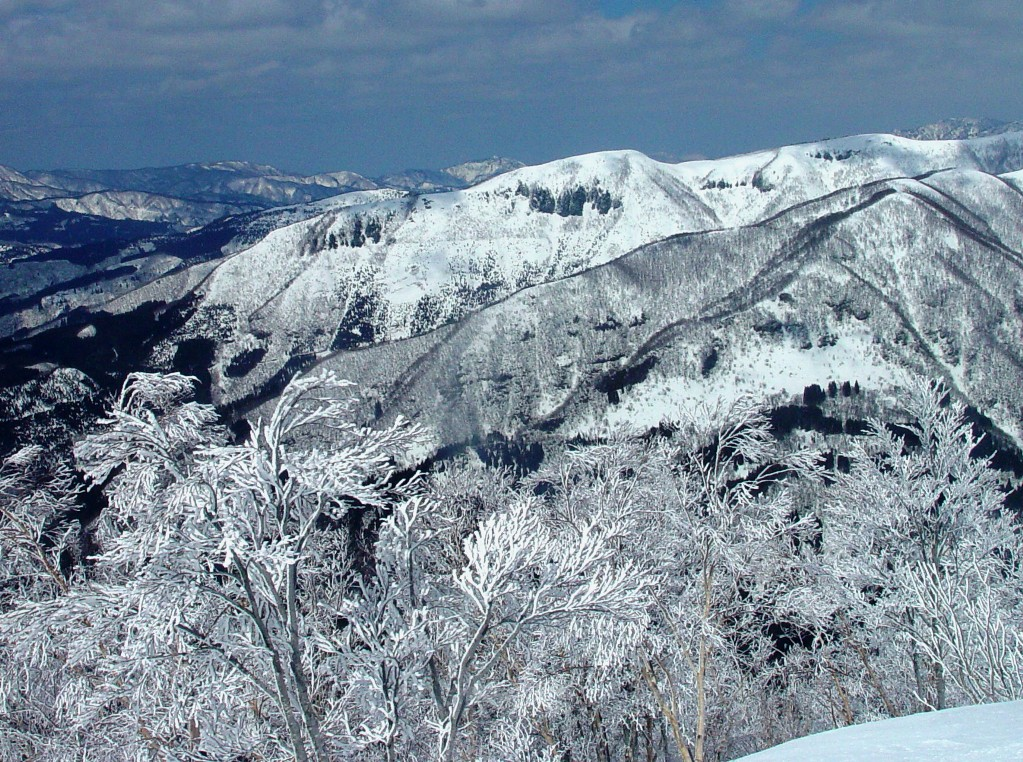
- Mount Toritate
- Interactive map of Okuetsu Kōgen Prefectural Natural Park
- Location: Fukui Prefecture, Japan
- Area: 332.39 km^{2} (128.34 sq mi)
- Established: 21 October 1955

Okuetsu Kōgen Prefectural Natural Park (奥越高原県立自然公園, Okuetsu Kōgen kenritsu shizen kōen) is a Prefectural Natural Park in Fukui Prefecture, Japan. Established in 1955, the park spans the municipalities of Ōno and Katsuyama. It includes Mount Akausagi (赤兎山), Mount Hōonji (法恩寺山), Mount Ōchō (大長山), and Mount Toritate (取立山).

== See also ==
- National Parks of Japan
- Hakusan National Park
