= Oucho Sparks =

- Origin: Chicago, Illinois, United States
- Genres: Indie rock, space rock, alternative rock, progressive rock
- Years active: 1998–present
- Labels: Dragon Watermelon / Ballistico
- Website: ouchosparks.com

Oucho Sparks is an American indie rock band based in Chicago, Illinois, United States.

Since the formation circa the turn of the century, the ensemble has gone through several style and personnel transitions. The consistent thread has been a strong display of musicianship, complex/dense song arrangements, and a DIY work ethic.

== About the band ==
The name Oucho Sparks is a phonetic play on the name Groucho Marx, an American comedian.

In its various incarnations, Oucho Sparks is known for its vocal harmonies, epic guitar lines, icy synths, and lush cinematic soundscapes. They have been compared to other rock bands such as Radiohead, Queen, The Flaming Lips, Frank Zappa, Arcade Fire, and Hawkwind.

== Timeline ==
The band formed around 1998 as a jazz fusion group with experimental tendencies. The founding members were Ryan Chindlund on drums, Robert Salihar on bass guitar and vocals, and Aaron Allietta on keyboards. Dan Haggerty and Scotty Kattenbraker were soon added as guitarists. The first album From The Blue Light House (1998) showcases this particular incarnation.

In the next year, the band had some significant personnel changes as guitarists Haggerty and Kattenbraker left to pursue other artistic ventures. The ensemble added a trumpet and saxophone, Mike Strazzulla and Jason Lavalle respectively. With the addition of horns, the jazz element was emphasized. Salihar remained as the main vocalist though Chindlund would perform the lead vocals on certain songs. The resulting work of this incarnation was the second album Rebirth of the Fool (1999.) The title is a word play on the Miles Davis album titled Birth of the Cool.

During 1999, the band performed several live shows but lost saxophonist Lavalle toward the end of the year. The band continued as a four piece until guitarist Rob Heinz and saxophonist Tim Sandusky joined in late 1999.

2000 proved to be a major transition for the band as many new members were added. Guitarists David Gallagher and David Bowers replaced guitarist Rob Heinz. Second drummer James Gallagher and trumpeter Matt Topic concurrently joined also. Much of the reason for this increase in personnel was in preparation for Zappening 2000, a festival held in tribute to Frank Zappa. The bill included bands with Zappa band alumni and notable acts with Zappa flavor.

After Zappening 2000 Dave Gallagher, Dave Bowers, James Gallagher, and Matt Topic all became official members as their other project (Dave's Tune) ceased performing. Soon after, violinist Chris Grant joined, thus making Oucho Sparks a ten-member band. This period produced the most Frank Zappa influenced music.

Silver Daddy Cover

By 2001 Oucho Sparks started to emphasize the progressive rock element of their sound. After dropping Mike Strazzulla, Chris Grant, and Matt Topic, the band embarked on recording Silver Daddy (2001.) This album is mostly instrumental and features some of the most advanced instrumental arrangements with sparse vocals by Salihar and Chindlund. Two songs from Silver Daddy ("Gropus" and "Floigan") appear in the 2002 film Urban Ground Squirrels.

Throughout 2001 and 2002 The seven member lineup performed several festivals and concerts most notably Camp Buzz and The Blackhawk Farms Festival.

The members of Oucho Sparks collectively founded an underground music venue named Cafe Ballistico in 2003. Many now notable Chicago music acts had some of their earliest performances at Cafe Ballistico including Bound Stems, Bang Bang (band), and The Andreas Kapsalis Trio. The Ballistico concept culminated at the 2004 Ballistico Fest featuring Oucho Sparks and several other Ballistico friendly bands.

Foreign Cars and Robots Cover

Except for Ballistico Fest, Oucho Sparks as a music project was unseen from 2003-2007. During that period, the band reformed once again and decided to take a more vocal-focused approach. In late 2003 the band started a new recording to help define the musical direction. Laura Grey joined to provide female vocals, while former saxophonist Tim Sandusky took over lead male vocals. In order to properly record this album, Tim Sandusky and cohorts built a recording studio in Chicago now known as Studio Ballistico. The album Foreign Cars and Robots was completed near the end of 2006. This album marked the modern age of Oucho Sparks and supporting shows in 2007 reflect this.

The project has been largely inactive since 2009.

== Live concerts ==
The band throughout its incarnations has been known for its "over the top" live shows involving props and theatrics. Currently Oucho Sparks desires theaters and alternative performance spaces for the multimedia show. A live concert was released on the official website in 2009, and free on YouTube.com.

== Discography ==
- 1998 From the Blue Light House
- 1999 Rebirth of the Fool
- 2001 Silver Daddy
- 2001 Live From Earth Vol. 1
- 2002 Live From Earth Vol. 2
- 2007 Foreign Cars and Robots
- 2009 Photographs & Epitaphs [Live]
