= Miyama =

Miyama may refer to:

- Miyama, Fukui, a former town in Asuwa District, Fukui Prefecture, Japan
  - Miyama Station, a train station in Fukui Prefecture, Japan
- Miyama, Fukuoka, a city in Fukuoka Prefecture, Japan
- Miyama, Kyoto, a former town in Kitakuwada District, Kyoto Prefecture, Japan
- Miyama, Mie, a former town in Kitamuro District, Mie Prefecture, Japan
- Miyama, Wakayama, a former village in Hidaka District, Wakayama Prefecture, Japan
- Mount Miyama, a mountain of Osaka Prefecture and Kyoto Prefecture, Japan
- Miyama (surname)
- 8296 Miyama, a main-belt asteroid
