= Koshino =

Koshino may refer to:

- Koshino, Fukui, a village in Japan
- Michiko Koshino, a Japanese fashion designer
