= Echizen, Fukui (town) =

Echizen 越前町
- Town
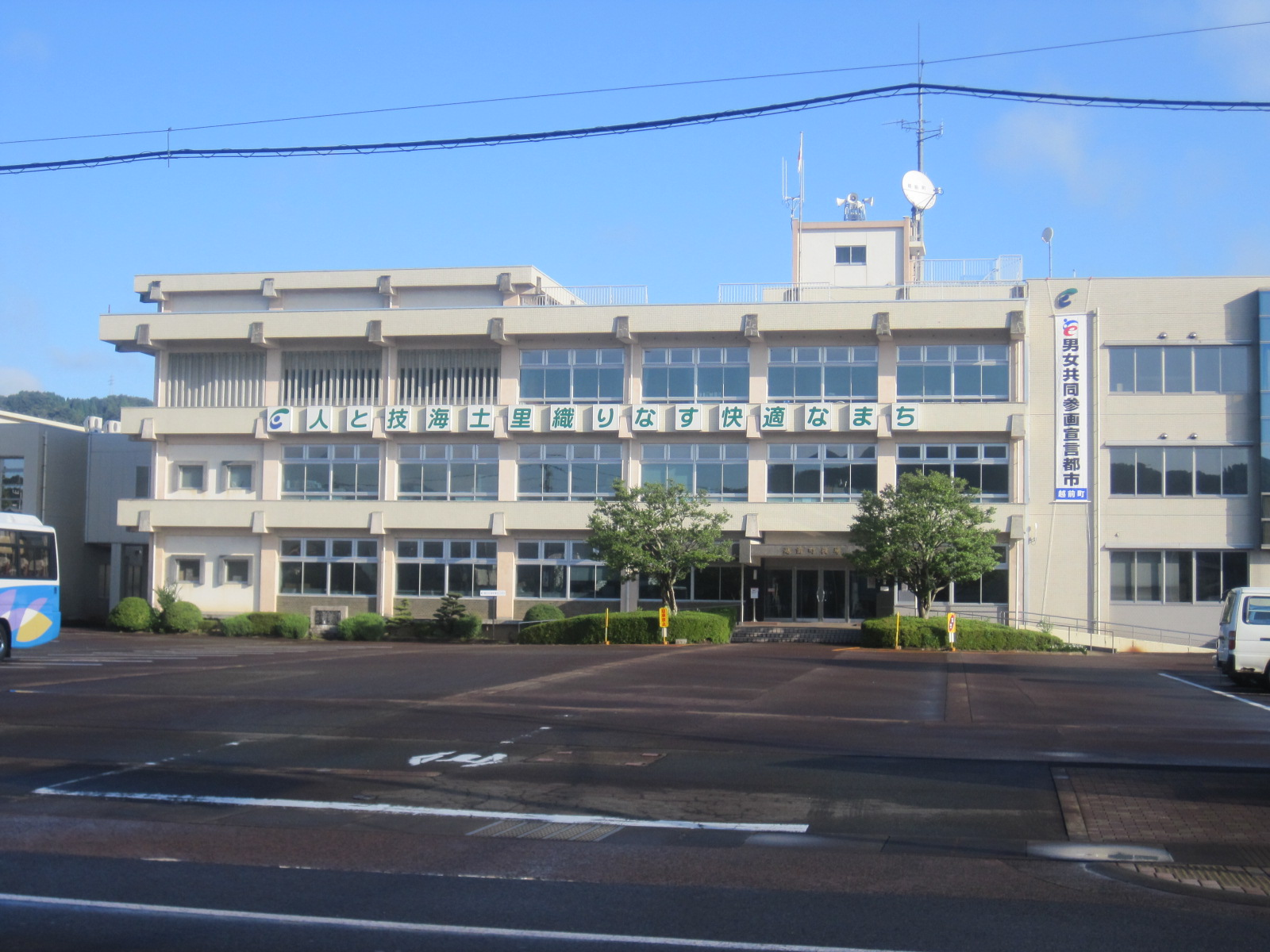
- Echizen Town Hall

- Flag Seal

- Location of Echizen town in Fukui Prefecture

- Coordinates: 35°58′27.3″N 136°7′47.2″E
- Country: Japan
- Region: Chūbu (Hokuriku)
- Prefecture: Fukui
- District: Nyū

Government
  - Mayor: Yoshihiko Aoyagi (March 2021)

Area
  - Total: 153.13 km^{2} (59.12 sq mi)

Population (March 1, 2026)
  - Total: 19,394
  - Density: 126.65/km^{2} (328.02/sq mi)
- Time zone: UTC+9 (Japan Standard Time)
- Phone number: 0778-34-1234
- Address: Echizen-chō, Nyū-gun, Fukui-ken 916-0192
- Website: www.town.echizen.fukui.jp
- Symbols
- Bird: Common gull
- Flower: Daffodil
- Tree: Bamboo

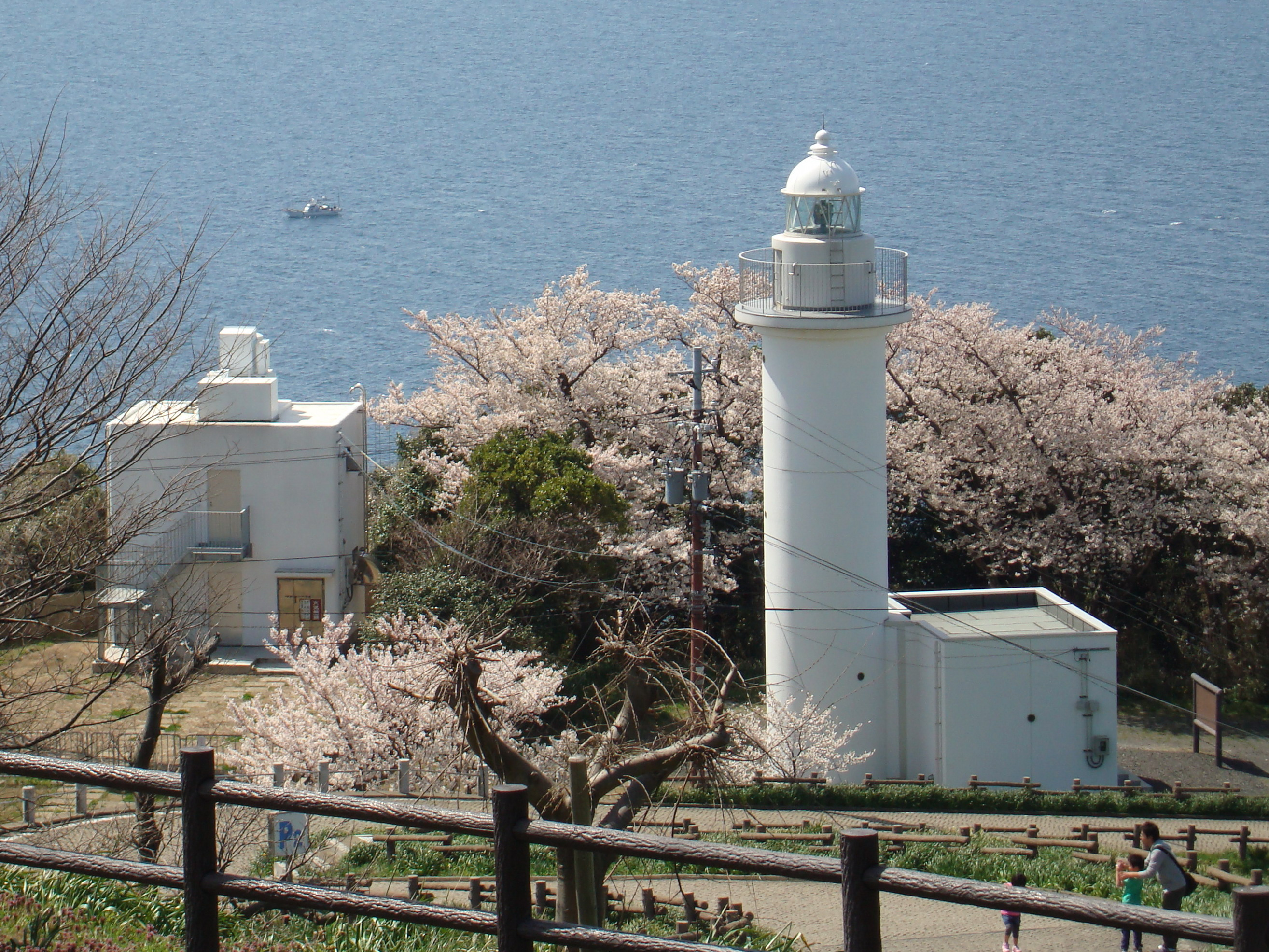
Echizenmisaki Lighthouse

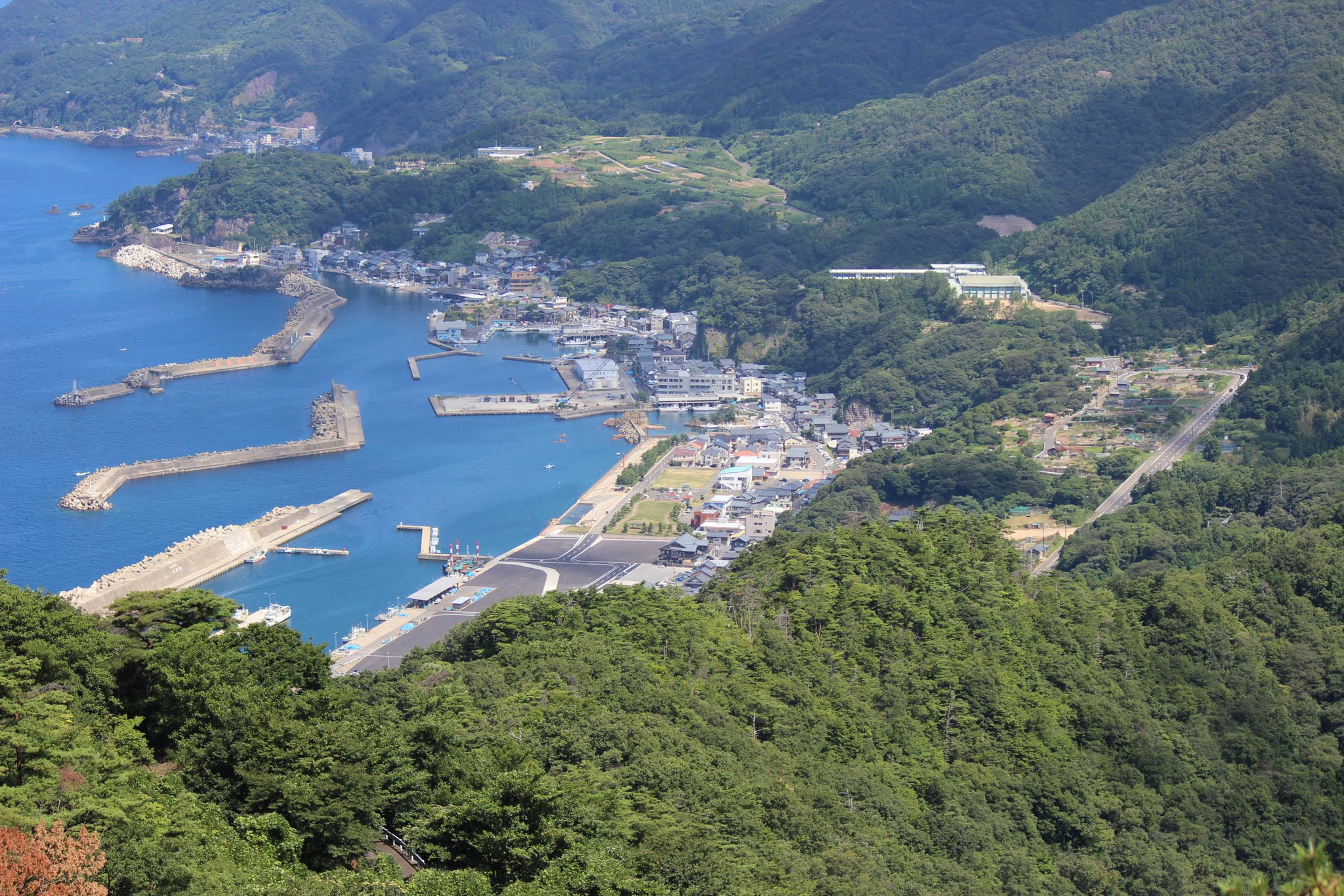
Echizen fishing port

Echizen (越前町, Echizen-chō) is a town located in Fukui Prefecture, Japan. As of 1 April 2026, the town had an estimated population of 19,394 in 7,261 households, and a population density of 153 persons per km^{2}. The total area of the town was 153.13 square kilometres (59.12 sq mi).

== Geography ==
Echizen town is located in the Nyū District of central Fukui Prefecture, bordered by the Sea of Japan to the west, and includes Cape Echizen, which at its westernmost point borders Wakasa Bay. To the east of the Echizen district, where the cliffs of the coastline continue, lies the Oda district, a basin separated by the Nyū Mountains, which rise to an altitude of around 500 meters. Following the river downstream from here, is the Miyazaki district in the valley, and the area around the town hall at the eastern end of the Asahi district is a flat plain integrated with the Sabae Basin. Parts of the coastal area of the town are within the borders of the Echizen-Kaga Kaigan Quasi-National Park.

=== Neighbouring municipalities ===
Fukui Prefecture

- Echizen
- Fukui
- Minamiechizen
- Sabae

=== Climate ===
Echizen has a Humid subtropical climate (Cfa per the Köppen climate classification system) characterized by warm, wet summers and cold winters with heavy snowfall. The average annual temperature in Echizen is 14.3 °C. The average annual rainfall is 2398 mm with September as the wettest month. The temperatures are highest on average in August, at around 25.9 °C, and lowest in January, at around 3.7 °C. Parts of the town are located within the extremely heavy snowfall area of Japan.

== Demographics ==
Per Japanese census data, the population of Echizen was relatively stable throughout the late 20th century but has declined in the 21st century.

Historical population
Year	Pop.	±%
1970	25,641	—
1980	25,992	+1.4%
1990	25,448	−2.1%
2000	25,017	−1.7%
2010	23,160	−7.4%
2020	20,118	−13.1%

== History ==
Echizen is part of ancient Echizen Province. During the Edo period, the area was mostly part of the holdings of Fukui Domain under the Tokugawa shogunate. Following the Meiji Restoration, and the establishment of the modern municipalities it was organised into part of Nyū District in Fukui Prefecture. The villages of Shirosaki and Shikaura were founded on April 1, 1889. Shikaura was raised to town status on August 1, 1946. The town of Echizen was formed on March 1, 1955, by the merger of Shikaura and Shirosaki. On February 1, 2005, the towns of Asahi and Ota, and the village of Miyazaki, all from Nyū District, were merged into Echizen.

== Government ==
Echizen has a mayor-council form of government with a directly elected mayor and a unicameral town legislature of 14 members. Echizen contributes one member to the Fukui Prefectural Assembly. In terms of national politics, the town is part of the Fukui 1st district of the lower house of the Diet of Japan.

== Economy ==
Echizen town has long been known as a production center for Echizen ware pottery, and numerous kilns are located within the town. The economy of modern Echizen town is mixed, with commercial fishing and agriculture prominent. Echizen is known for its production of high quality crab, rice, pottery, and daffodils. Asahi Southern Industrial Park has been developed in the former Asahi district.

== Education ==
Echizen town has eight public elementary schools and four middle schools operated by the city government. The town has one public high school operated by the Fukui Prefectural Board of Education.

- Asahi Junior High School
- Echizen Junior High School
- Miyazaki Junior High School
- Nyu High School
- Ota Junior High School

== Transportation ==
=== Railway ===
Echizen town has had no public passenger railway service following the discontinuation of the Fukui Railway Sabaura Line in 1973.. The nearest station is Shinmei Station on the Fukui Railway Fukubu Line.

=== Highway ===
- National Route 305
- National Route 365
- National Route 417

== International relations ==
=== Sister cities ===
- Miyama, Fukuoka, Japan
- Montevallo, Alabama, United States, since 2008

=== Friendship cities ===
- Nishio, Aisho, Japan
- Yeongdeok County, South Korea

== Local attractions ==
- Echizen-Kaga Kaigan Quasi-National Park
- Echizen ware ceramics
- Tsurugi Shrine
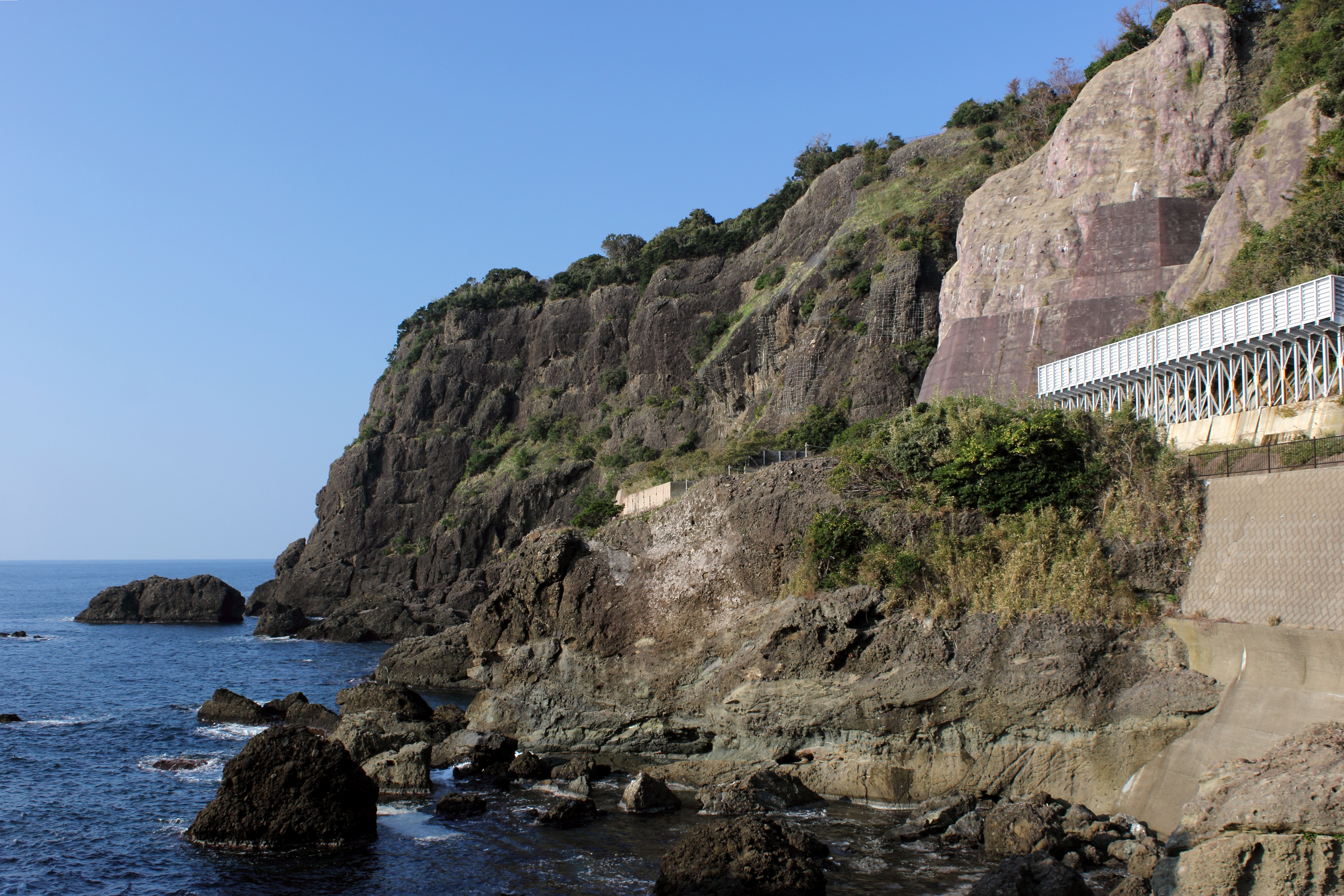
Cape Echizen

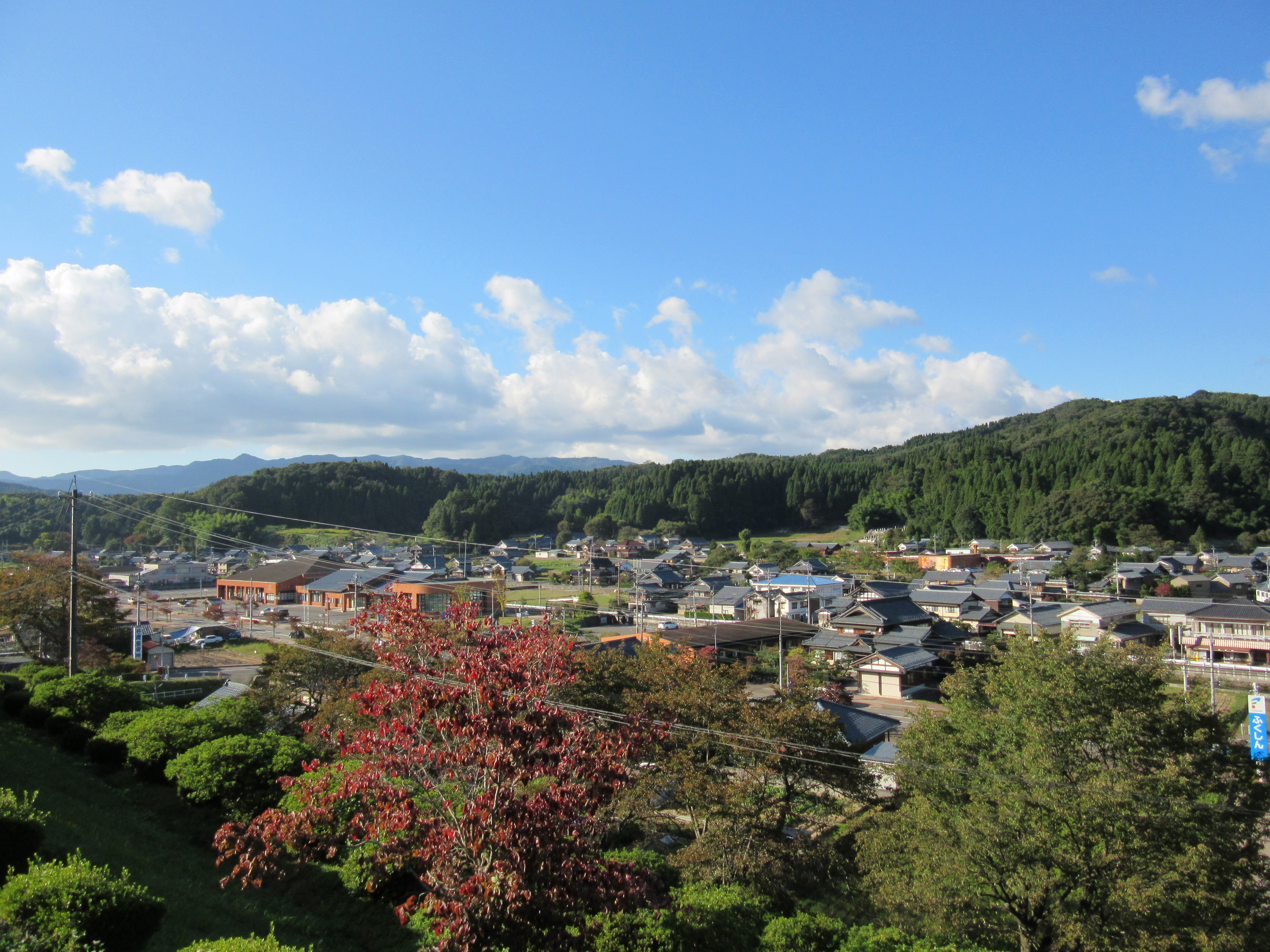
Miyazaki area of Echizen

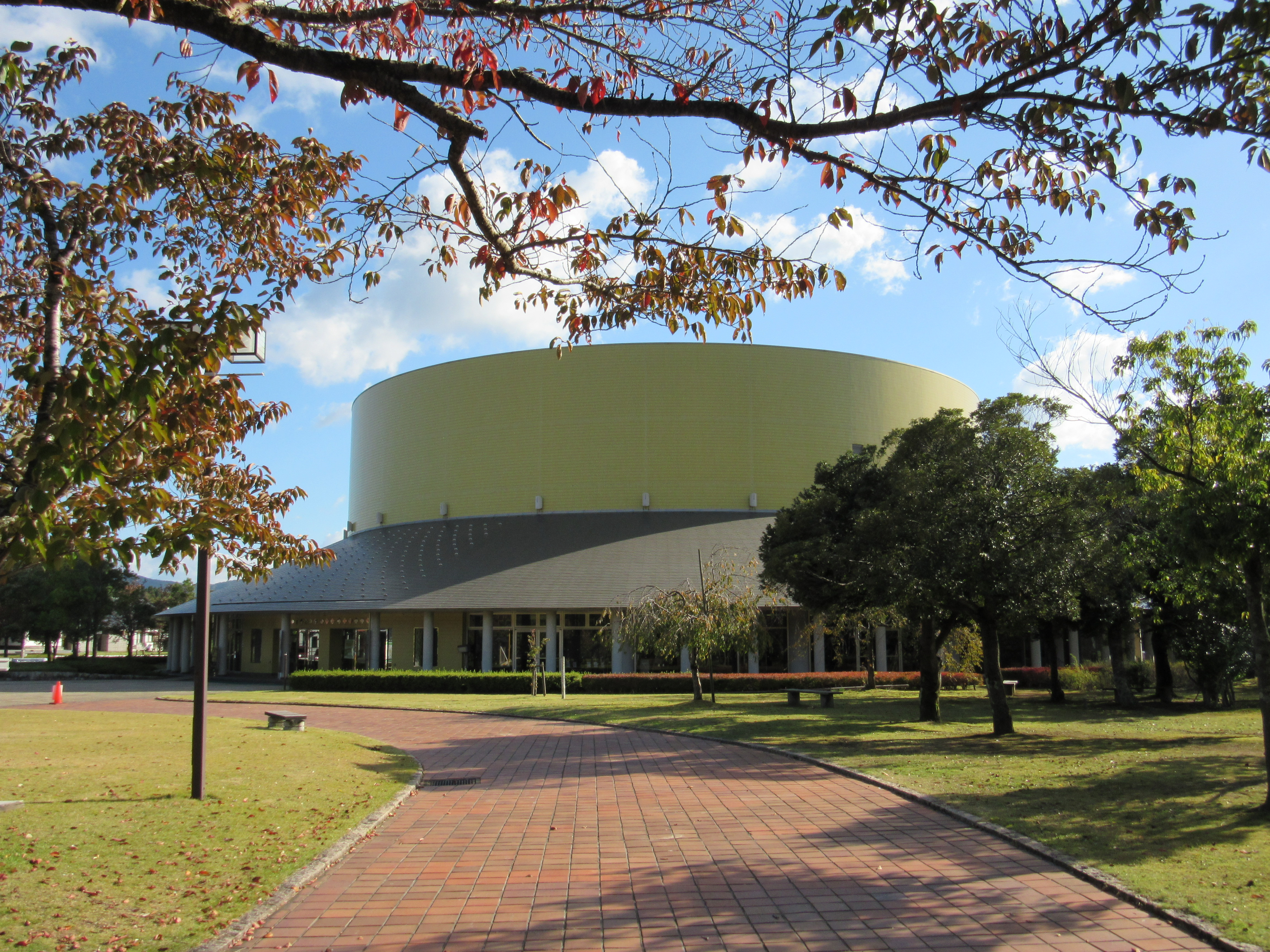
Echizen Pottery Village and Cultural Exchange Center

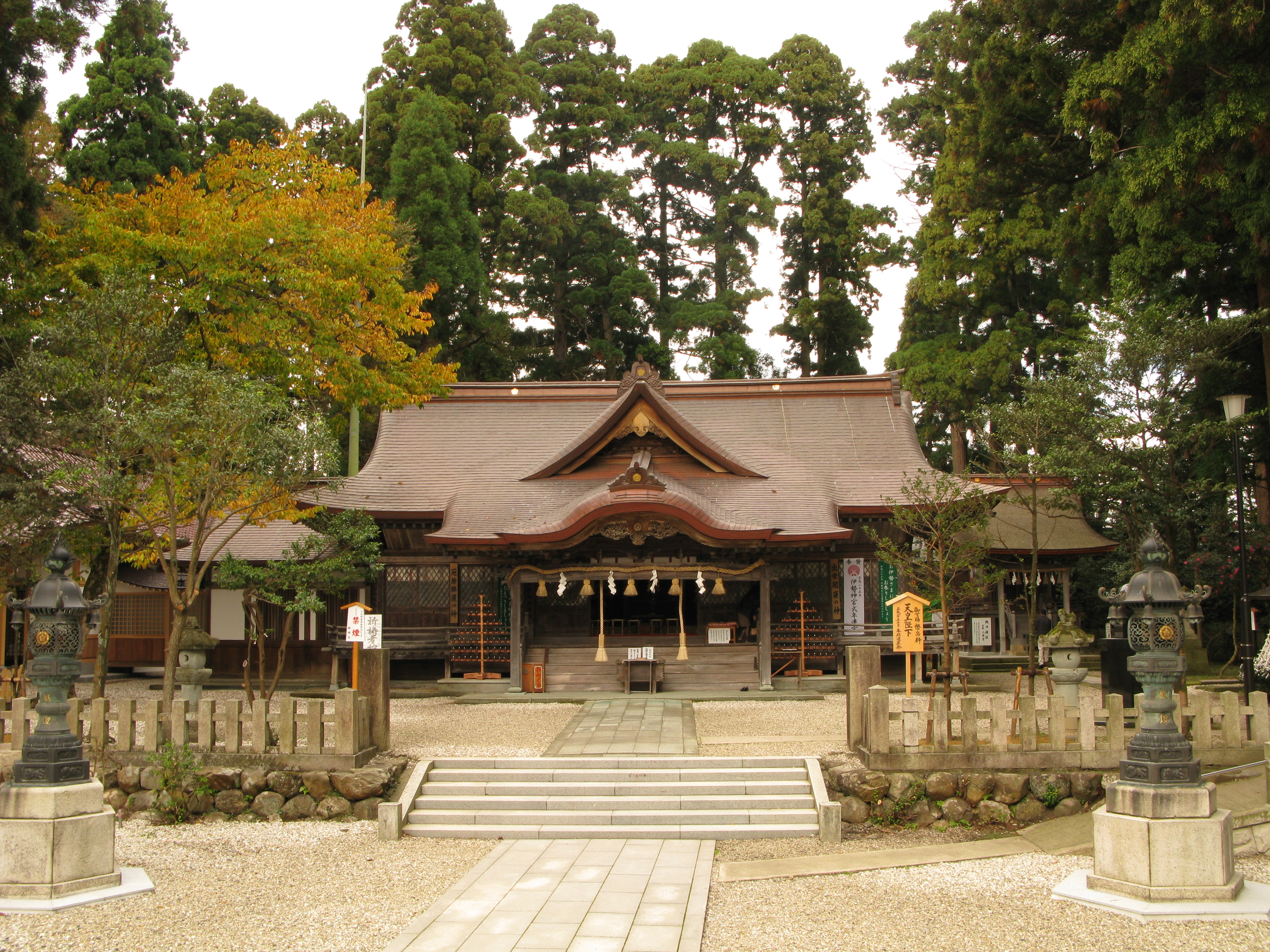
Tsurugi Shrine
