= Shimizu, Fukui =

Dissolved municipality in Fukui prefecture, Japan

Shimizu (清水町, Shimizu-chō) was a town located in Nyū District, Fukui Prefecture, Japan.

As of 2003, the rural town had an estimated population of 10,333 and a density of 243.19 persons per km^{2}. The total area was 42.49 km^{2}.

On February 1, 2006, Shimizu, along with the village of Koshino (also from Nyū District), and town of Miyama (from Asuwa District), was merged into the expanded city of Fukui.
