= Ota, Fukui =

Dissolved municipality in Fukui prefecture, Japan

Ota (織田町, Ota-chō) was a town located in Nyū District, Fukui Prefecture, Japan.

As of 2003, the town had an estimated population of 5,194 and a density of 132.43 persons per km^{2}. The total area was 39.22 km^{2}.

On February 1, 2005, Ota, along with the town of Asahi, and the village of Miyazaki (all from Nyū District), was merged into the expanded town of Echizen to create the new town of Echizen, and no longer exists as an independent municipality.
