= Echizen ware =

Type of Japanese pottery

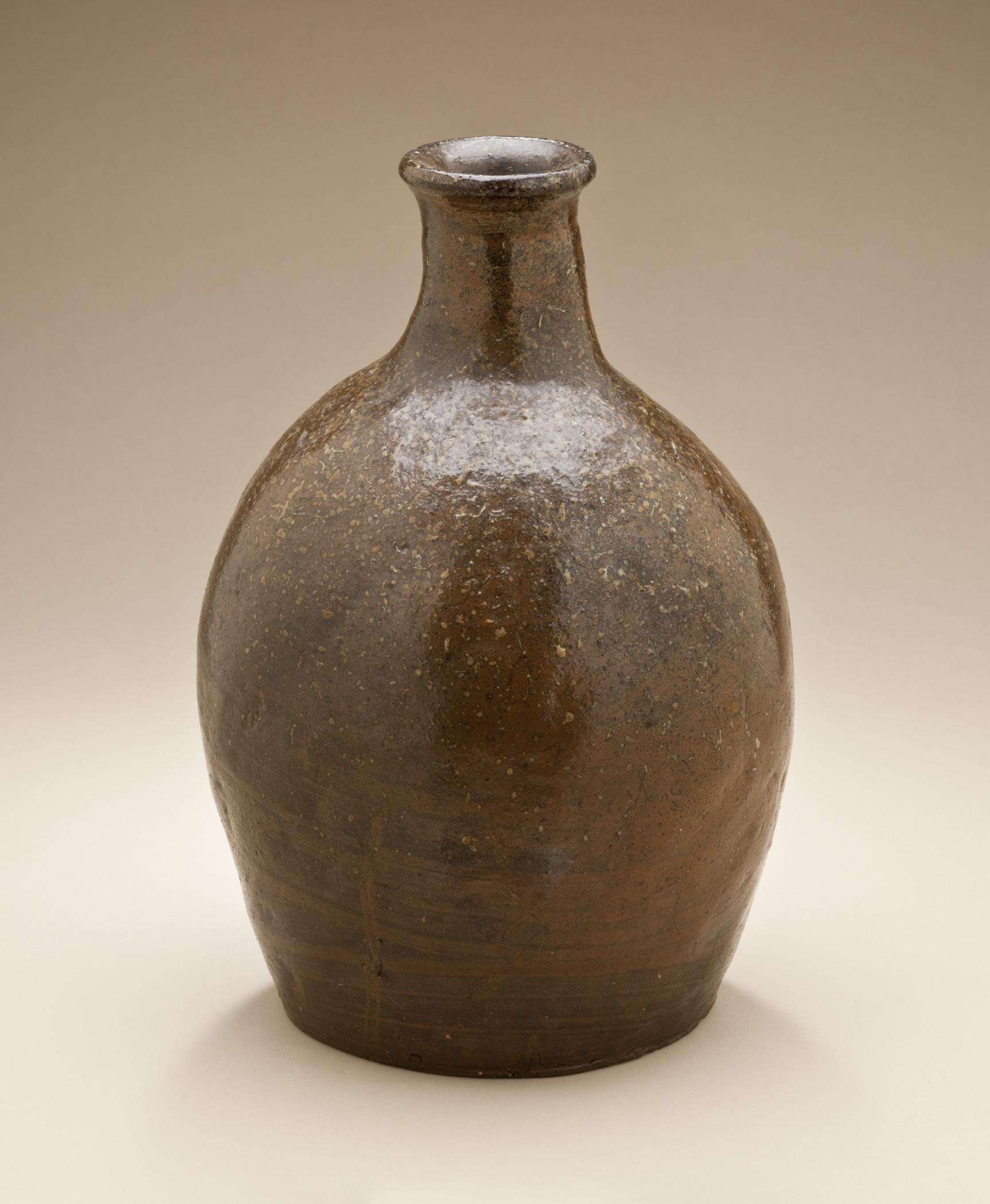
Echizen ware sake bottle (tokkuri), Momoyama period, late 16th century

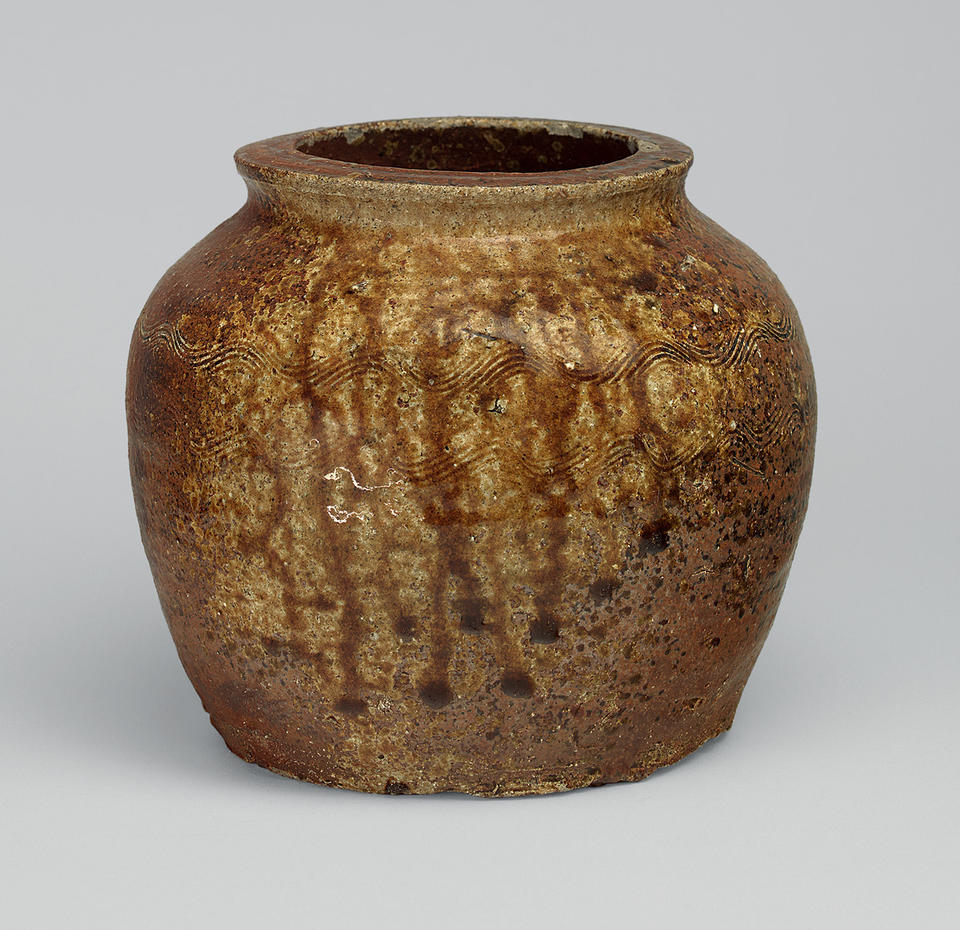
Echizen ware widemouthed oil jar (kame) with wave pattern, stoneware with natural ash glaze, Edo period, 18th century

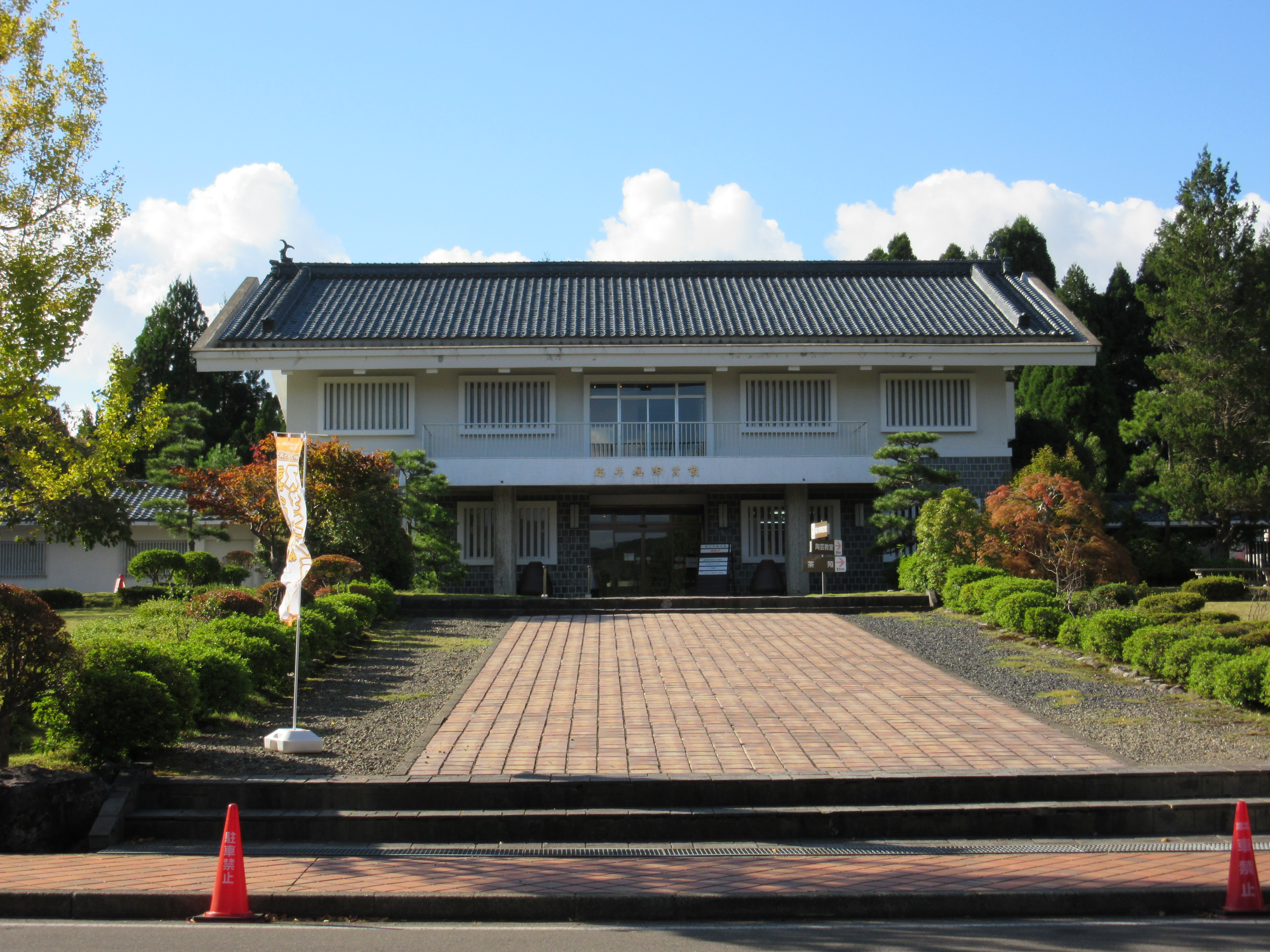
Echizen Pottery Village, Fukui Pottery Museum

Echizen ware (越前焼, Echizen-yaki) is a type of Japanese pottery traditionally produced in Echizen, Odacho and Miyazaki Fukui Prefecture.

It is considered one of the Six Ancient Kilns of Japan.

The Echizen Pottery Village showcases a wide variety of this pottery style.
