= Asuwa District, Fukui =

Former district in Fukui prefecture, Japan

Asuwa (足羽郡, Asuwa-gun) was a district located in Fukui Prefecture, Japan.

The time before the dissolution, the district had an estimated population of 5,044 with a density of 36.62 persons per km^{2}. The total area was 137.73 km^{2}.

== Municipalities ==
Prior to its dissolution, the district consisted of only one town:

- Miyama (美山町, Miyama-chō) (Note: Classified as a town.)

== History ==
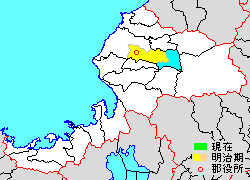
Map showing original extent of Asuwa District in Fukui Prefecture: * yellow - areas formerly within the district borders during the early Meiji period

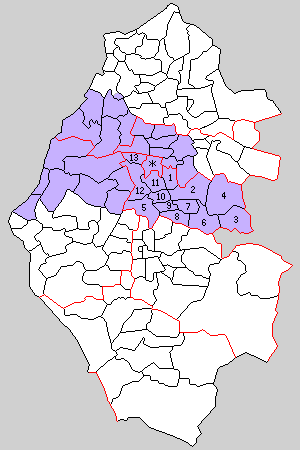
Asuwa-gun as established in 1889, with modern Fukui-shi in purple.

The district was first established in 1878, with a county office in Fukui Sakae-cho that governed both Asuwa and Yoshida Districts.

=== District Timeline ===
Pre-1889	1889-1912	1912-1944	1945-1955	1955-1989		1989-2006	Post-2006
?	Fukui-shi (福井市)		Fukui-shi	Fukui-shi	Fukui-shi	Fukui-shi	Fukui-shi
?	Wada-mura (和田村)	Incorporated into Fukui-shi on 1 May 1936	Fukui-shi	Fukui-shi	Fukui-shi	Fukui-shi	Fukui-shi
?	Kita-mura (木田村)	Incorporated into Fukui-shi on 1 October 1936	Fukui-shi	Fukui-shi	Fukui-shi	Fukui-shi	Fukui-shi
?	Higashiayo-mura (東安居村)	Incorporated into Fukui-shi on 1 August 1939	Fukui-shi	Fukui-shi	Fukui-shi	Fukui-shi	Fukui-shi
?	Yashiro-mura (社村)		Incorporated into Fukui-shi on 1 April 1954	Fukui-shi	Fukui-shi	Fukui-shi	Fukui-shi
?	Asotsu-mura (麻生津村)			Incorporated into Fukui-shi on 1 October 1957	Fukui-shi	Fukui-shi	Fukui-shi
?	Sake-mura (酒生村)		Merged to form Asuwa-mura on 31 March 1955	Reorganized as Asuwa-cho on 1 August 1960	Incorporated into Fukui-shi on 1 September 1971	Fukui-shi	Fukui-shi
?	Ichijōdani-mura (一乗谷村)		Merged to form Asuwa-mura on 31 March 1955	Reorganized as Asuwa-cho on 1 August 1960	Incorporated into Fukui-shi on 1 September 1971	Fukui-shi	Fukui-shi
?	Kamimonju-mura (上文殊村)		Merged to form Asuwa-mura on 31 March 1955	Reorganized as Asuwa-cho on 1 August 1960	Incorporated into Fukui-shi on 1 September 1971	Fukui-shi	Fukui-shi
?	Shitamonju-mura (下文殊村)		Merged to form Asuwa-mura on 31 March 1955	Reorganized as Asuwa-cho on 1 August 1960	Incorporated into Fukui-shi on 1 September 1971	Fukui-shi	Fukui-shi
?	Rokujō-mura (六条村)		Merged to form Asuwa-mura on 31 March 1955	Reorganized as Asuwa-cho on 1 August 1960	Incorporated into Fukui-shi on 1 September 1971	Fukui-shi	Fukui-shi
?	Tōgō-mura (東郷村)		Incorporated into Asuwa-mura on 10 July 1955	Reorganized as Asuwa-cho on 1 August 1960	Incorporated into Fukui-shi on 1 September 1971	Fukui-shi	Fukui-shi
?	Kamiusaka-mura (上宇坂村)		Merged to form Miyama-mura on 11 February 1955	Reorganized as Miyama-cho on 1 August 1964	Miyama-cho	Incorporated into Fukui-shi on 1 February 2006	Fukui-shi
?	Shimousaka-mura (下宇坂村)		Merged to form Miyama-mura on 11 February 1955	Reorganized as Miyama-cho on 1 August 1964	Miyama-cho	Incorporated into Fukui-shi on 1 February 2006	Fukui-shi
?	Ashimi-mura, Ōno-gun (芦見村)		Merged to form Miyama-mura on 11 February 1955	Reorganized as Miyama-cho on 1 August 1964	Miyama-cho	Incorporated into Fukui-shi on 1 February 2006	Fukui-shi
?	Hanyu-mura, Ōno-gun (羽生村)		Merged to form Miyama-mura on 11 February 1955	Reorganized as Miyama-cho on 1 August 1964	Miyama-cho	Incorporated into Fukui-shi on 1 February 2006	Fukui-shi
?	Kamimi-mura, Ōno-gun (上味見村)		Merged to form Miyama-mura on 11 February 1955	Reorganized as Miyama-cho on 1 August 1964	Miyama-cho	Incorporated into Fukui-shi on 1 February 2006	Fukui-shi
?	Shimomi-mura, Ōno-gun (下味見村)		Merged to form Miyama-mura on 11 February 1955	Reorganized as Miyama-cho on 1 August 1964	Miyama-cho	Incorporated into Fukui-shi on 1 February 2006	Fukui-shi

=== Recent mergers ===
- On February 1, 2006 - The town of Miyama, along with the town of Shimizu and the village of Koshino (both from Nyū District) were merged into the expanded city of Fukui. Therefore, Asuwa District was dissolved as a result of this merger.

== See also ==
- List of dissolved districts of Japan
