= Asahi, Fukui =

Dissolved municipality in Fukui prefecture, Japan

Asahi (朝日町, Asahi-chō) was a town located in Nyū District, Fukui Prefecture, Japan.

As of 2003, the town had an estimated population of 9,463 and a density of 208.12 persons per km^{2}. The total area was 45.47 km^{2}.

On February 1, 2005, Asahi, along with the town of Ota, and the village of Miyazaki (all from Nyū District), was merged into the expanded town of Echizen to create the new town of Echizen, and no longer exists as an independent municipality.
