= Nyū District, Fukui =

District in Fukui Prefecture, Japan

Coordinates: 35°58′12″N 136°04′05″E

Nyū (丹生郡, Nyū-gun) is a district in Fukui Prefecture, Japan.

As of 2005, the district has an estimated population of 23,995 with a density of 157 persons per km^{2}. The total area is 152.83 km^{2}.

== Municipalities ==
The district consists of one town:

- Echizen (Note: Classified as a town.)

== History ==
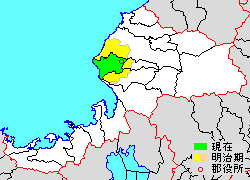
Map showing original extent of Nyū District in Fukui Prefecture: * yellow - areas formerly within the district borders during the early Meiji period: 1. Echizen-machi

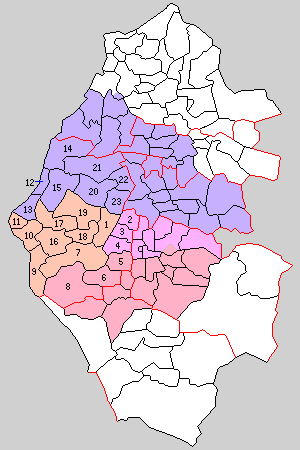
Colored areas indicate the borders of 3rd millennium municipalities. Numbers represent 1889 municipalities in this district.

=== Recent mergers ===
- On February 1, 2005 - The towns of Asahi and Ota, and the village of Miyazaki were merged into the expanded town of Echizen.
- On February 1, 2006 - The town of Shimizu and the village of Koshino, along with the town of Miyama (from Asuwa District), were merged into the expanded city of Fukui.
