= Miyama, Fukui =

Dissolved municipality in Fukui prefecture, Japan

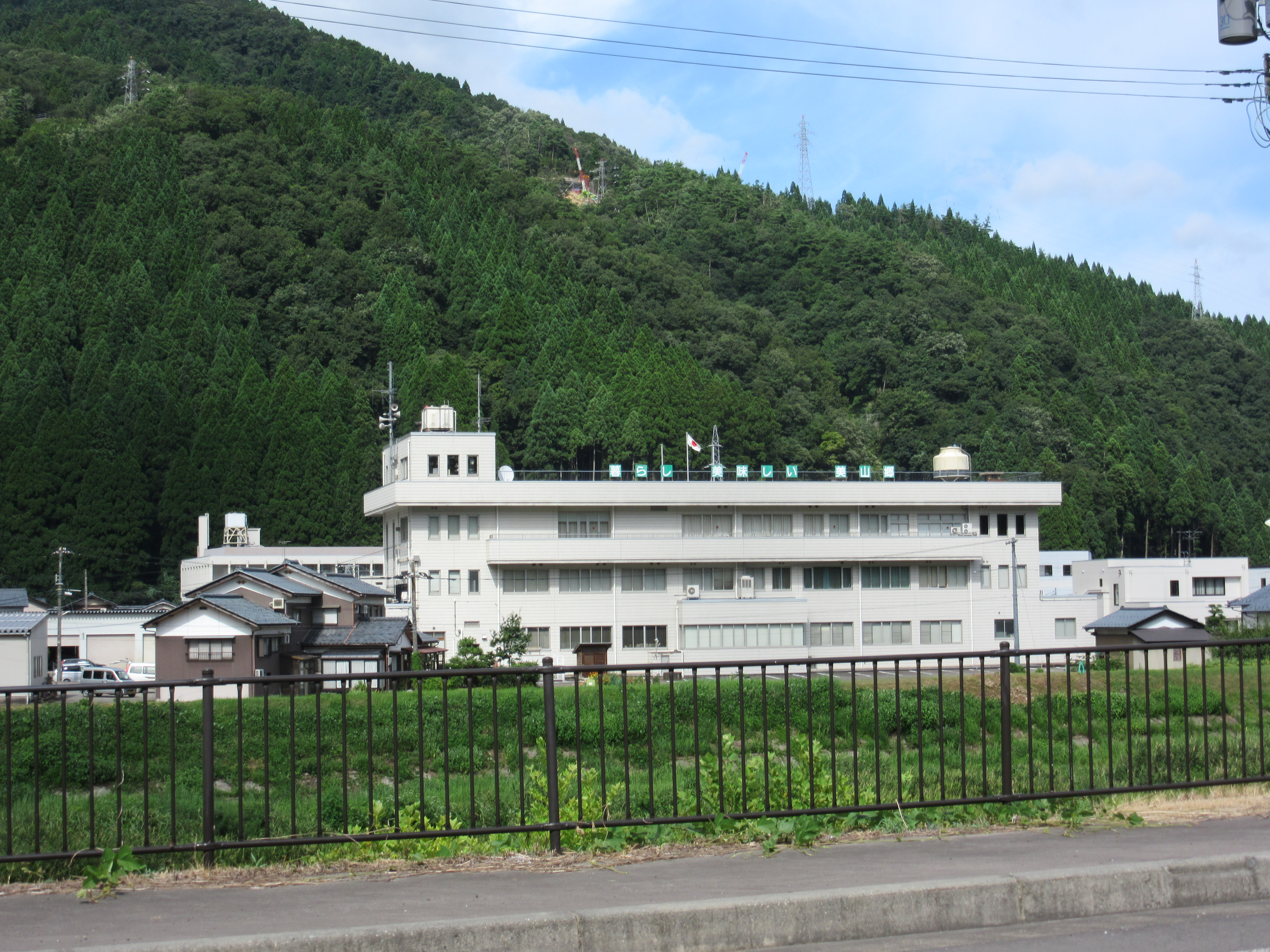
former Miyama Town Hall

Miyama (美山町, Miyama-chō) was a town located in Asuwa District, Fukui Prefecture, Japan.

As of 2003, the town had an estimated population of 5,044 and a density of 36.62 persons per km^{2}. The total area was 137.73 km^{2}.

On February 1, 2006, Miyama, along with the town of Shimizu, and the village of Koshino (both from Nyū District), was merged into the expanded city of Fukui.
