= Miyazaki, Fukui =

Dissolved municipality in Fukui prefecture, Japan

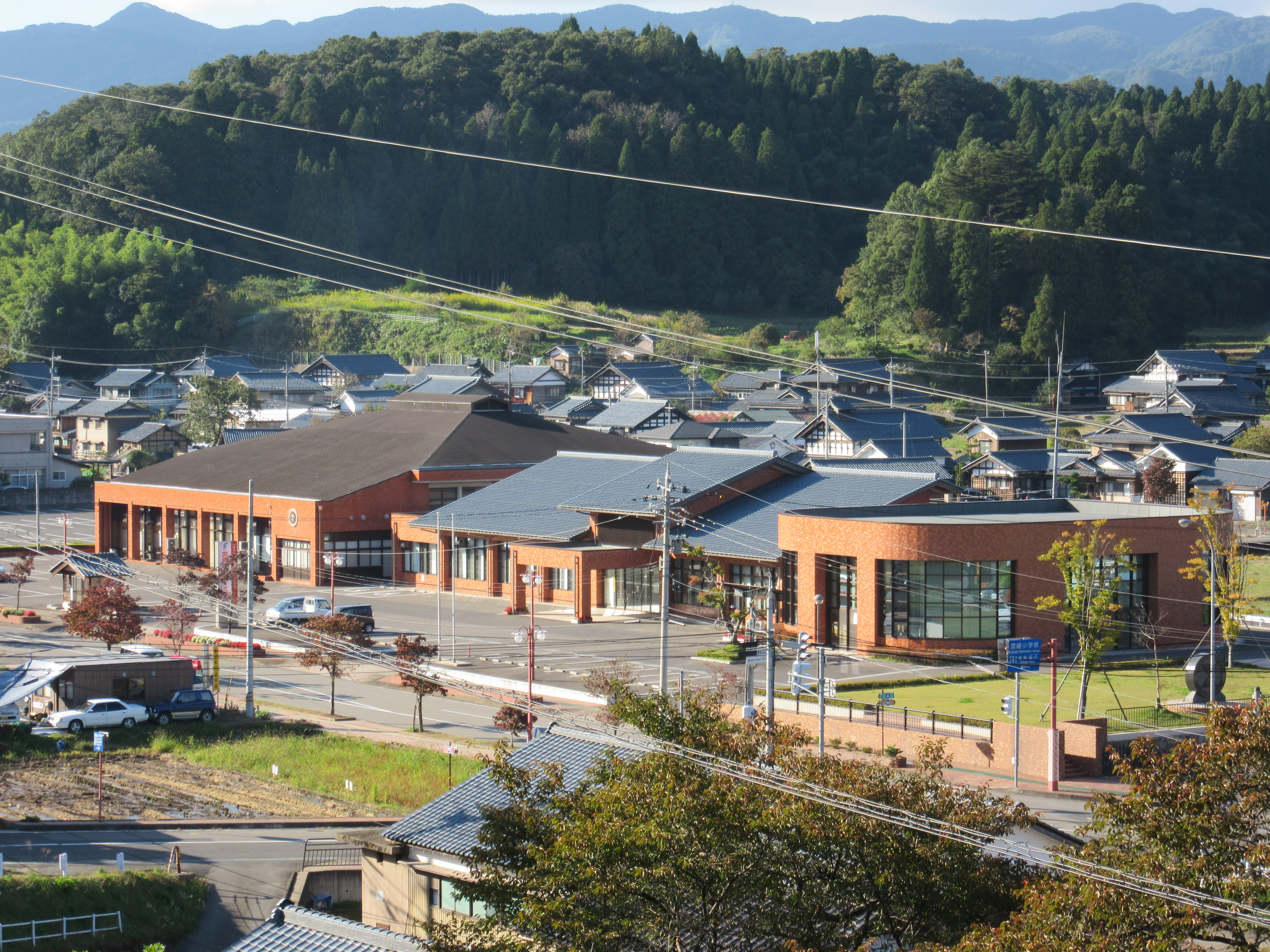
former Miyazaki Village Hall

Miyazaki (宮崎村, Miyazaki-mura) was a village located in Nyū District, Fukui Prefecture, Japan.

As of 2003, the village had an estimated population of 4,033 and a density of 121.99 persons per km^{2}. The total area was 33.06 km^{2}.

On February 1, 2005, Miyazaki, along with the towns of Asahi and Ota (all from Nyū District), was merged into the expanded town of Echizen to create the new town of Echizen, and no longer exists as an independent municipality.
