= Miyama (surname) =

Miyama (written: 美山 lit. "beauty mountain", 深山 lit. "mountain recess" or 宮間) is a Japanese surname. Notable people with the surname include:

- Aya Miyama (宮間 あや, born 1985), Japanese footballer
- Eijiro Miyama (宮間 英次郎, born 1934), Japanese artist
- Karen Miyama (美山 加恋, born 1996), Japanese actress
- Sajiro Miyama (宮間 佐治郎, born 1917), Japanese boxer
- Shizuo Miyama (深山 静夫), Japanese footballer
- Takuya Miyama (深山 卓也, born 1954), Japanese jurist
