= Mount Miyama =

Mountain in the country of Japan

- 深山
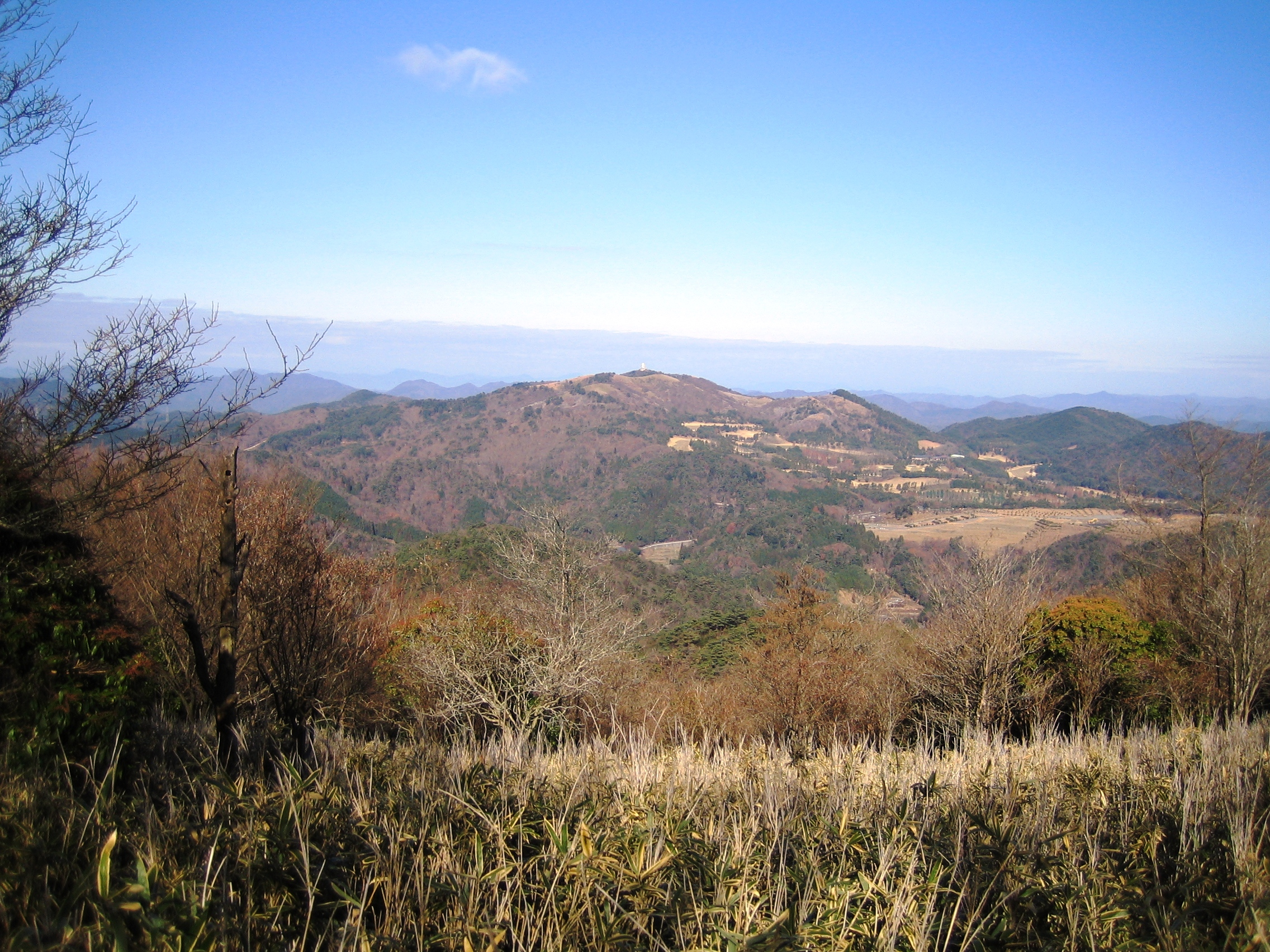
- Seen from the south

Highest point
- Elevation: 790.5 m (2,594 ft)
- Listing: List of mountains and hills of Japan by height
- Coordinates: 35°2′30″N 135°22′40″E

Naming
- Language of name: Japanese
- Pronunciation: [mijama]

Geography
- Location: Nose, Osaka and Nantan, Kyoto, Japan
- Parent range: Hokusetsu Mountains

Geology
- Mountain type: fault-block

Mount Miyama (深山, Miyama) is a 790.5 m (2,594 ft) mountain, located on the border of Nose, Osaka and Nantan, Kyoto, Japan.

== Outline ==
Mount Miyama is the tallest mountain of Hokusetsu Mountains. This mountain is one of Osaka 50 mountains, and a part of Hokusetsu Natural Park.

== Route ==
There are three major routes to the top of this mountain. One is from Okururi Valley and it takes one hour and 50 minutes to the top of the mountain. Second one is from Hirono, and it takes two hours 50 minutes. The last one is from Fukuzumi, in Sasayama, Hyōgo and it takes two and half hours.

== Access ==
- Okururikei Bus Stop of Chukyo Bus
- Hirono Bus Stop of Chukyo Bus
- Fukuzumi Bus Stop of Shinki Bus

== Gallery ==
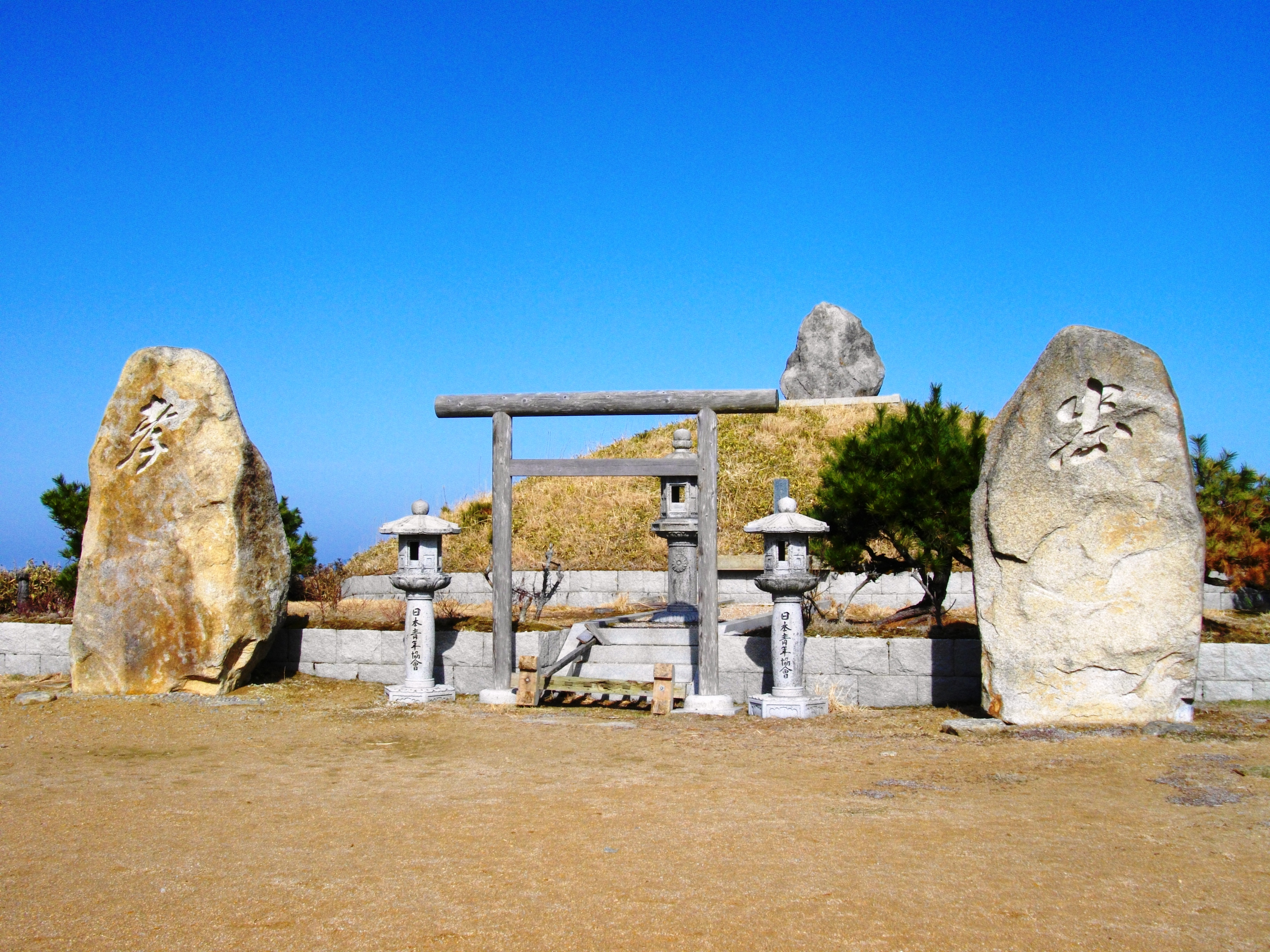
Miyama Shrine on the top of Mount Miyama

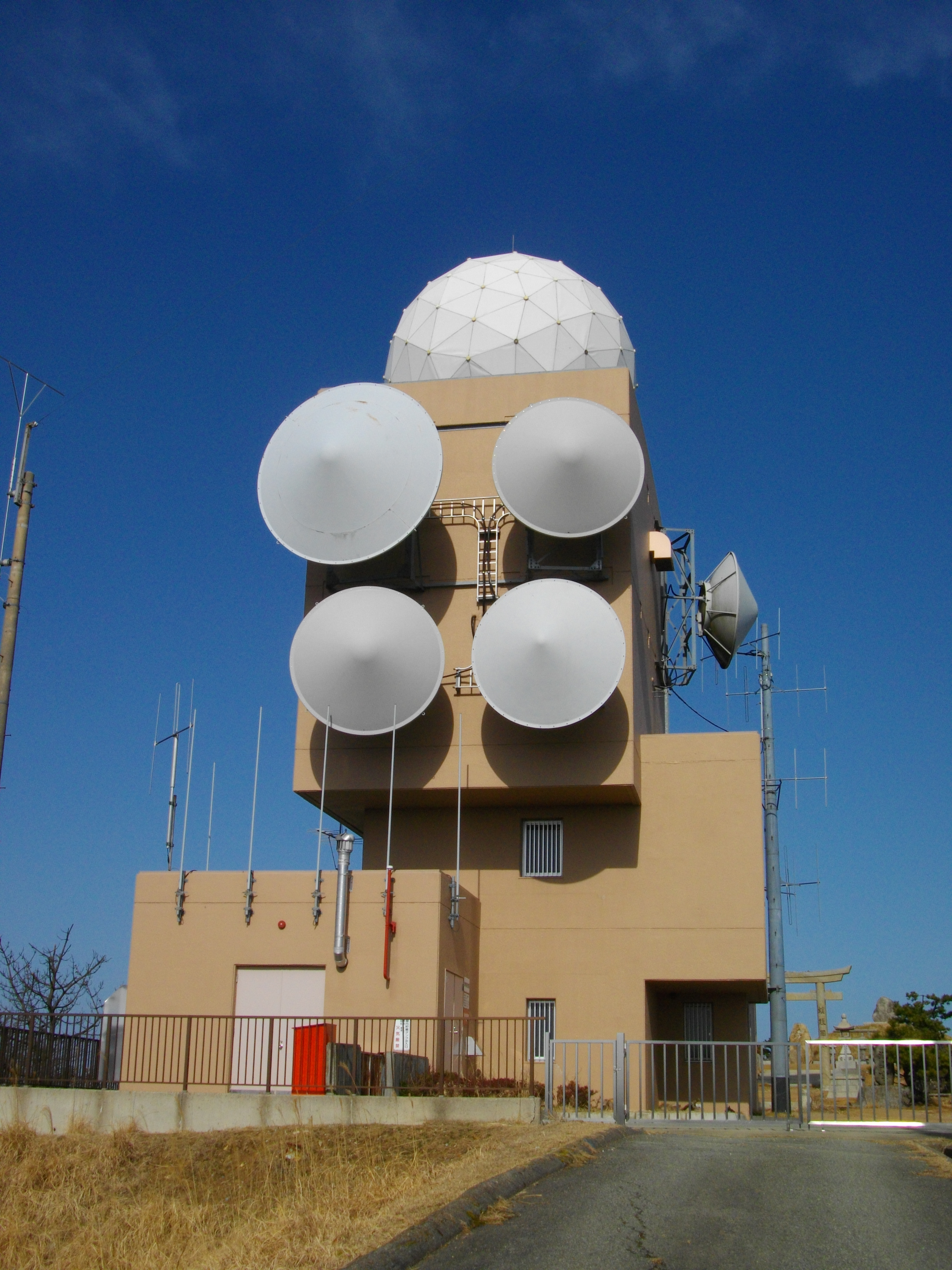
A weather station on the top of Mount Miyama

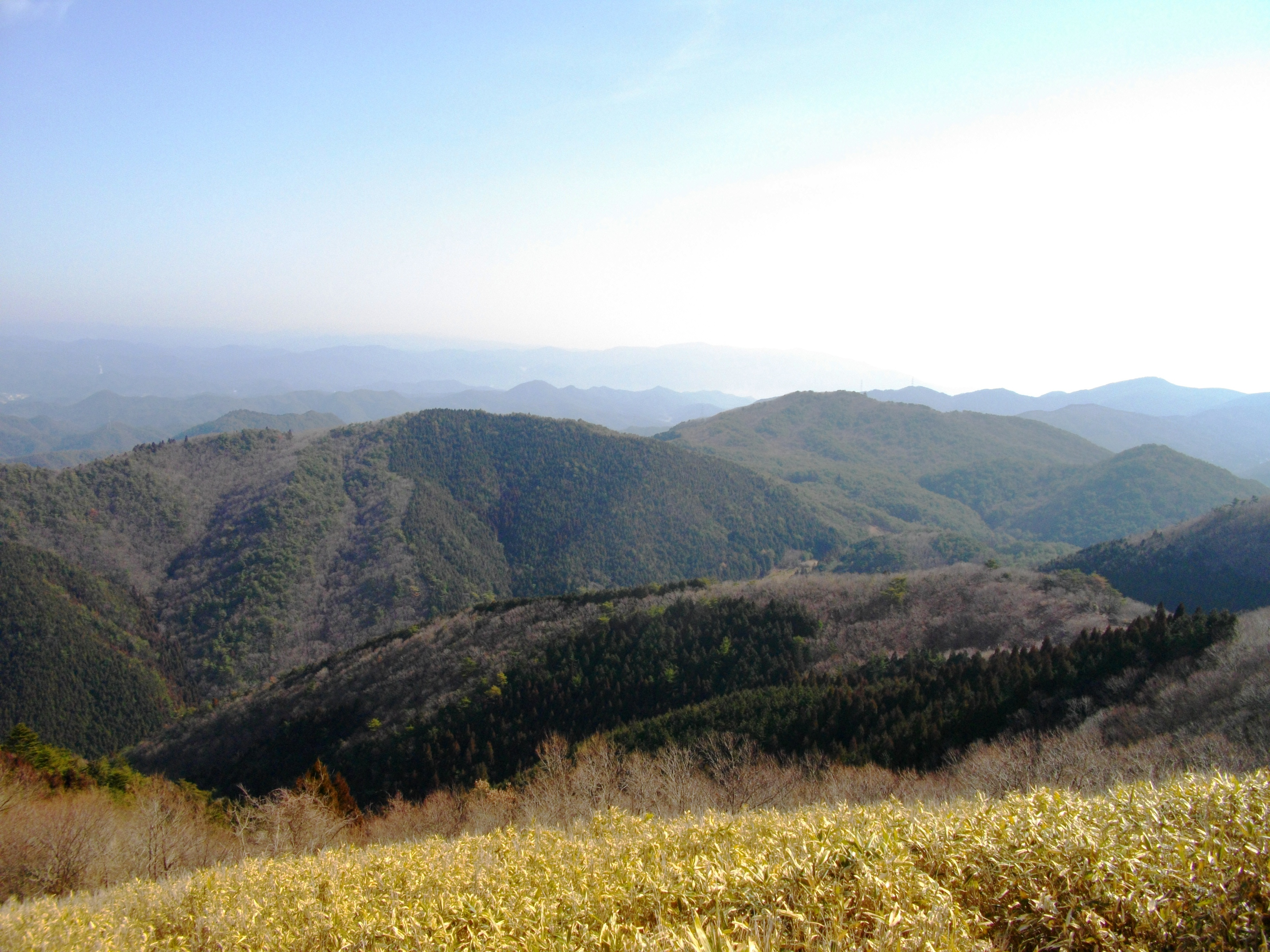
Looking east from the top of Mount Miyama

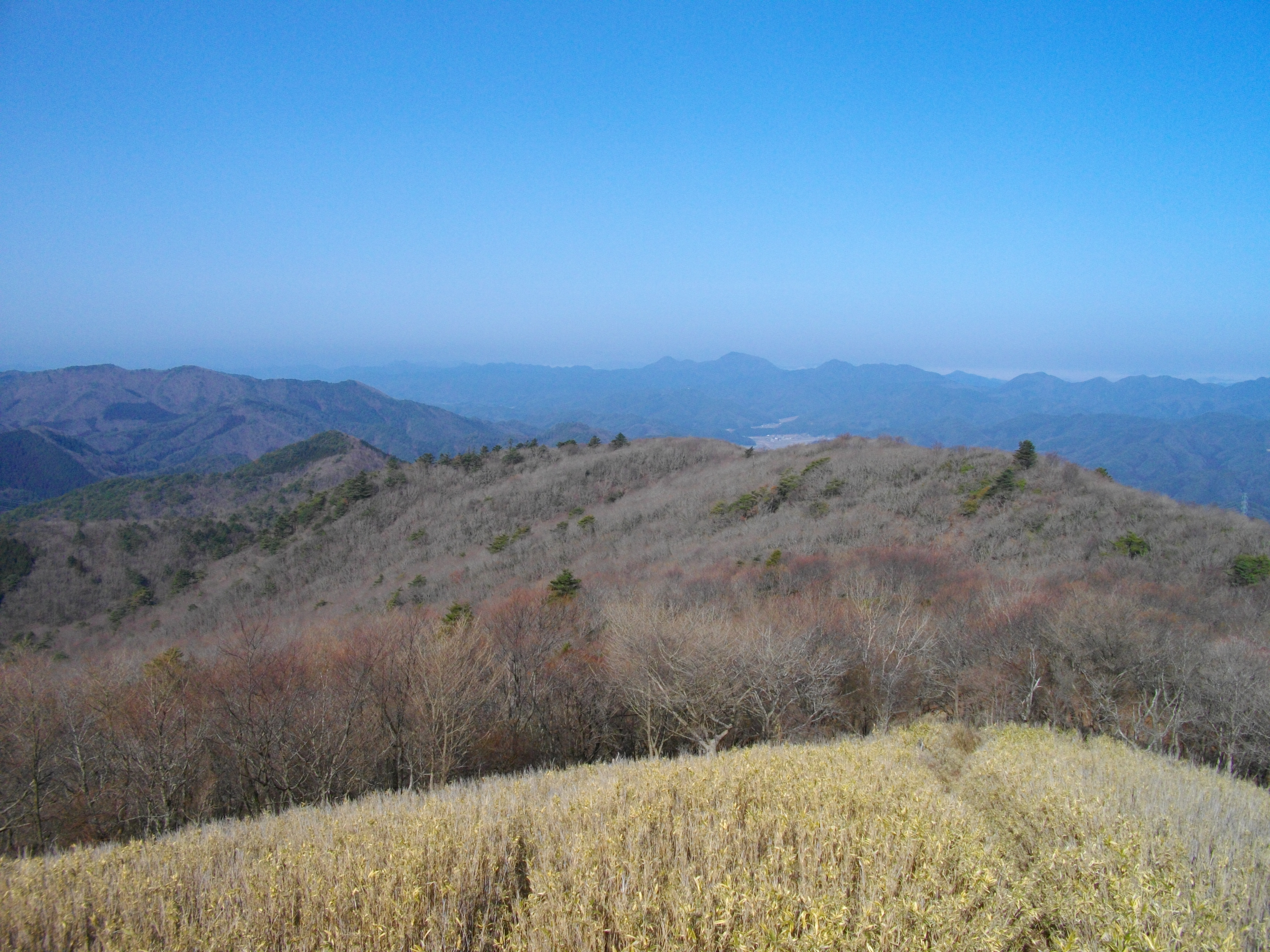
Looking WNW from the top of Mount Miyama

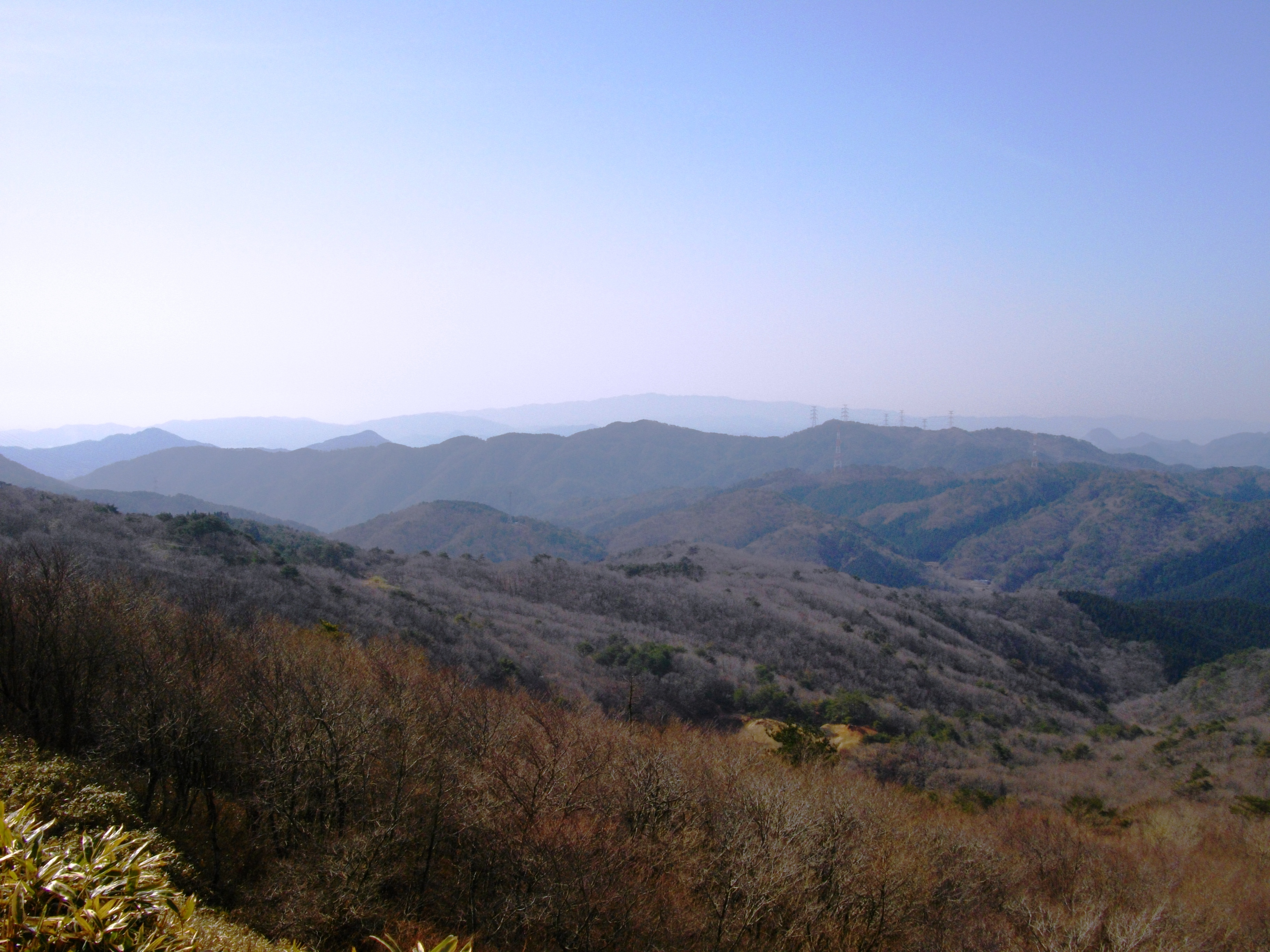
Looking south from the top of Mount Miyama

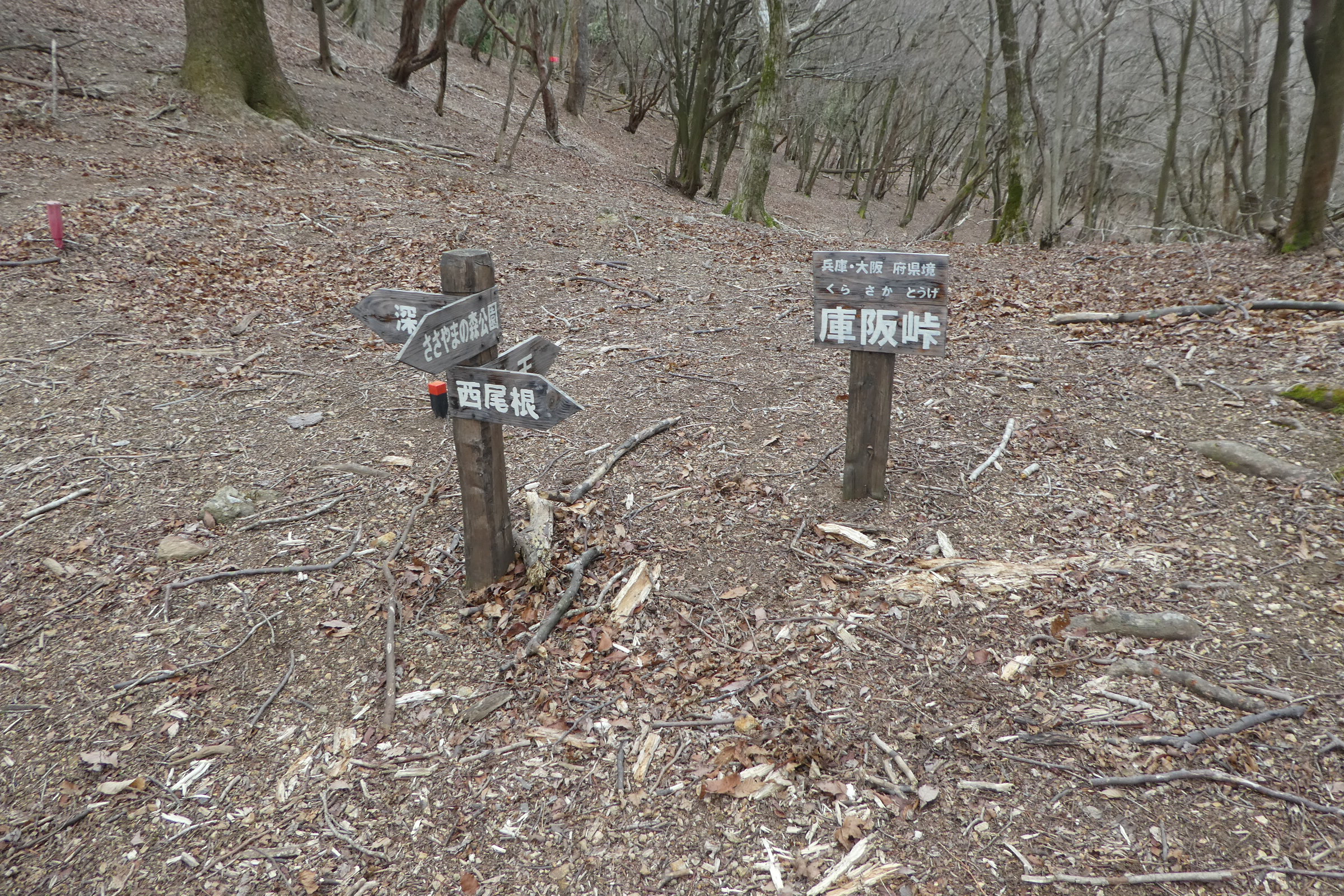
Kurasawa Pass

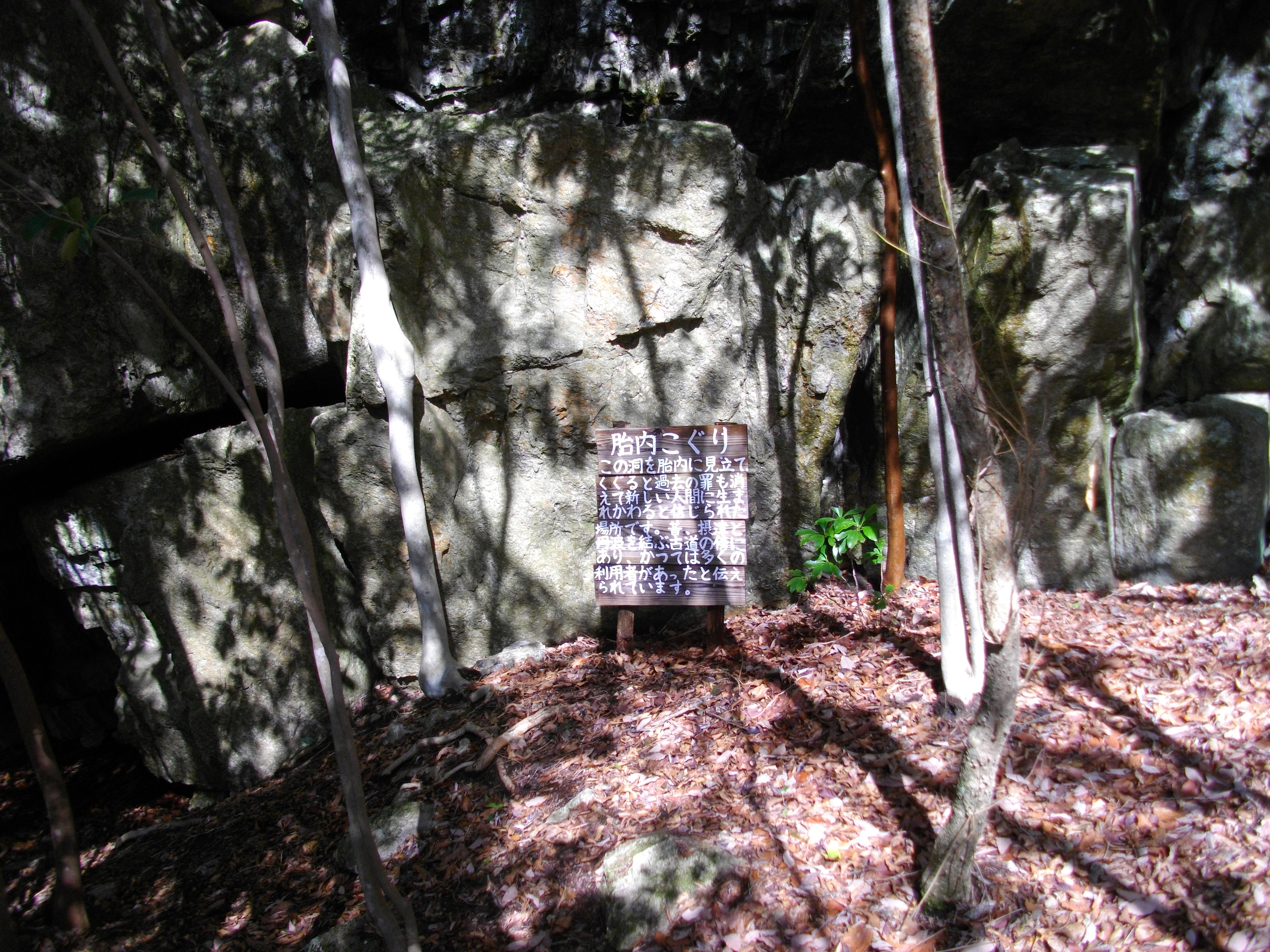
A religious object in Mount Miyama
