= Koshino, Fukui =

Village in Fukui Prefecture, Japan

Koshino 越廼村
- Village (former)
- Overlooking Koshino Village

- Location within Japan
- Coordinates: 36°02′21″N 136°00′46″E
- Country: Japan
- Prefecture: Fukui
- District: Nyū
- Formed: 1889-04-01
- Dissolved: 2006-02-01

Area
  - Total: 15.35 km^{2} (5.93 sq mi)

Population (2003)
  - Total: 1,793
  - Density: 116.8/km^{2} (302.5/sq mi)
- Time zone: UTC+9 (Japan Standard Time)
- Postal code: 910-3592
- Area code: 0776

Koshino (越廼村, Koshino-mura) was a village located in Nyū District, Fukui Prefecture, Japan.

As of 2003, the village had an estimated population of 1,793 and a density of 116.81 persons per km^{2}. The total area was 15.35 km^{2}.

On February 1, 2006, Koshino, along with the town of Shimizu (also from Nyū District), and the town of Miyama (from Asuwa District), was merged into the expanded city of Fukui.
