= List of railway stations in Japan: F =

List of railway stations in Japan

A	B	C	D	E	F	G	H	I	J	KL	M	N	O	P	R	S	T	U	W	Y	Z

This list shows the railway stations in Japan that begin with the letter F. This is a subset of the full list of railway stations in Japan.

== Station list ==
Family-Kōemmae Station	ファミリー公園前駅（ふぁみりーこうえんまえ）
Ferry Terminal Station	フェリーターミナル駅
Flower Town Station	フラワータウン駅
Fruit Park Station	フルーツパーク駅
Fubasami Station	文挟駅（ふばさみ）
Fuchidaka Station	渕高駅（ふちだか）
Fuchigaki Station	淵垣駅（ふちがき）
Fuchinobe Station	淵野辺駅（ふちのべ）
Fuchū Station (Hiroshima)	府中駅 (広島県)（ふちゅう）
Fuchū Station (Kyoto)	府中駅 (京都府)（ふちゅう）
Fuchū Station (Tokyo)	府中駅 (東京都)（ふちゅう）
Fuchū-Hommachi Station	府中本町駅（ふちゅうほんまち）
Fuchū-Usaka Station	婦中鵜坂駅（ふちゅううさか）
Fuchūkeiba-Seimon-mae Station	府中競馬正門前駅（ふちゅうけいばせいもんまえ）
Fuda Station	布田駅（ふだ）
Fudai Station	普代駅（ふだい）
Fudōin-mae Station	不動院前駅（ふどういんまえ）
Fudōmae Station	不動前駅（ふどうまえ）
Fudōnosawa Station	不動の沢駅（ふどうのさわ）
Fuji Station	富士駅（ふじ）
Fujie Station	藤江駅（ふじえ）
Fujieda Station	藤枝駅（ふじえだ）
Fujifilm-mae Station	富士フイルム前駅（ふじふいるむまえ）
Fujigaoka Station (Aichi)	藤が丘駅 (愛知県)（ふじがおか）
Fujigaoka Station (Kanagawa)	藤が丘駅 (神奈川県)（ふじがおか）
Fujii Station	藤井駅（ふじい）
Fujiidera Station	藤井寺駅（ふじいでら）
Fujikawa Station (Aichi)	藤川駅（ふじかわ）
Fujikawa Station (Shizuoka)	富士川駅（ふじかわ）
Fujikoshi Station	不二越駅（ふじこし）
Fujikyu Highland Station	富士急ハイランド駅（ふじきゅうはいらんど）
Fujimatsu Station	富士松駅（ふじまつ）
Fujimi Station	富士見駅（ふじみ）
Fujimichō Station (Kanagawa)	富士見町駅 (神奈川県)（ふじみちょう）
Fujimichō Station (Tottori)	富士見町駅 (鳥取県)（ふじみちょう）
Fujimidai Station	富士見台駅（ふじみだい）
Fujimigaoka Station	富士見ヶ丘駅（ふじみがおか）
Fujimino Station	ふじみ野駅（ふじみの）
Fujinami Station (Wakayama)	藤並駅（ふじなみ）
Fujinami Station (Aichi)	藤浪駅（ふじなみ）
Fujine Station (Iwate)	藤根駅（ふじね）
Fujine Station (Shizuoka)	富士根駅（ふじね）
Fujino Station	藤野駅（ふじの）
Fujinoki Station	藤ノ木駅（ふじのき）
Fujinomiya Station	富士宮駅（ふじのみや）
Fujinomori Station	藤森駅（ふじのもり）
Fujinoushijima Station	藤の牛島駅（ふじのうしじま）
Fujioka Station (Tochigi)	藤岡駅（ふじおか）
Fujioka Station (Shizuoka)	富士岡駅（ふじおか）
Fujisaka Station	藤阪駅（ふじさか）
Fujisaki Station (Aomori)	藤崎駅 (青森県)（ふじさき）
Fujisaki Station (Fukuoka)	藤崎駅 (福岡県)（ふじさき）
Fujisakigū-mae Station	藤崎宮前駅（ふじさきぐうまえ）
Fujisan Station	富士山駅（ふじさん）
Fujisawa Station	藤沢駅（ふじさわ）
Fujisawa-Hommachi Station	藤沢本町駅（ふじさわほんまち）
Fujishima Station	藤島駅（ふじしま）
Fujishiro Station	藤代駅（ふじしろ）
Fujita Station	藤田駅（ふじた）
Fujitana Station	藤棚駅（ふじたな）
Fujitec-mae Station	フジテック前駅（ふじてっくまえ）
Fujiyama Station	藤山駅（ふじやま）
Fujiyamashita Station	富士山下駅（ふじやました）
Fujū Station	藤生駅（ふじゅう）
Fukado Station	深戸駅（ふかど）
Fukae Station	深江駅 (兵庫県)（ふかえ）
Fukaebashi Station	深江橋駅（ふかえばし）
Fukagawa Station	深川駅（ふかがわ）
Fukai Station	深井駅（ふかい）
Fukamizo Station	深溝駅（ふかみぞ）
Fukata Station	深田駅（ふかた）
Fukaura Station	深浦駅（ふかうら）
Fukaya Station	深谷駅（ふかや）
Fukaya Hanazono Station	ふかや花園駅（ふかやはなぞの）
Fukechō Station	深日町駅（ふけちょう）
Fukekō Station	深日港駅（ふけこう）
Fuki Station	富貴駅（ふき）
Fukiage Station (Aichi)	吹上駅 (愛知県)（ふきあげ）
Fukiage Station (Saitama)	吹上駅 (埼玉県)（ふきあげ）
Fukkōdaimae Station	福工大前駅（ふっこうだいまえ）
Fukkoshi Station	吹越駅（ふっこし）
Fukōda Station	深郷田駅（ふこうだ）
Fuku Station	福駅（ふく）
Fukube Station	福部駅（ふくべ）
Fukuchi Station	福地駅（ふくち）
Fukuchiyama Station	福知山駅（ふくちやま）
Fukuchiyama-shimin-byōin-guchi Station	福知山市民病院口駅（ふくちやましみんびょういんぐち）
Fukudaimae Station	福大前駅（ふくだいまえ）
Fukudaimae Nishi-Fukui Station	福大前西福井駅（ふくだいまえにしふくい）
Fukudamachi Station	福田町駅（ふくだまち）
Fukue Station	福江駅（ふくえ）
Fukugami Station	福神駅（ふくがみ）
Fukugawa Station	福川駅（ふくがわ）
Fukuhara Station	福原駅（ふくはら）
Fukui Station (Tochigi)	福居駅（ふくい）
Fukui Station (Fukui)	福井駅 (福井県)（ふくい）
Fukui Station (Okayama)	福井駅 (岡山県)（ふくい）
Fukui Castle Ruins-daimyomachi Station	福井城址大名町駅（ふくいじょうしだいみょうまち）
Fukuiguchi Station	福井口駅（ふくいぐち）
Fukuma Station	福間駅（ふくま）
Fukumitsu Station	福光駅（ふくみつ）
Fukuno Station (Gifu)	福野駅 (岐阜県)（ふくの）
Fukuno Station (Toyama)	福野駅 (富山県)（ふくの）
Fukuoka Station	福岡駅（ふくおか）
Fukuoka Airport Station	福岡空港駅（ふくおかくうこう）
Fukuoka Kamotsu Terminal Station	福岡貨物ターミナル駅（ふくおかかもつたーみなる）
Fukuonji Station	福音寺駅（ふくおんじ）
Fukura Station	吹浦駅（ふくら）
Fukuro Station	袋駅 (熊本県)（ふくろ）
Fukuroda Station	袋田駅（ふくろだ）
Fukurogura Station	袋倉駅（ふくろぐら）
Fukuroi Station	袋井駅（ふくろい）
Fukuro-machi Station	袋町駅（ふくろまち）
Fukusaki Station	福崎駅（ふくさき）
Fukushima Station (Fukushima)	福島駅 (福島県)（ふくしま）
Fukushima Station (Osaka)	福島駅 (大阪府)（ふくしま）
Fukushima-chō Station	福島町駅（ふくしまちょう）
Fukushimagakuin-mae Station	福島学院前駅（ふくしまがくいんまえ）
Fukushimaguchi Station	福島口駅（ふくしまぐち）
Fukushima-Imamachi Station	福島今町駅（ふくしまいままち）
Fukushima-Takamatsu Station	福島高松駅（ふくしまたかまつ）
Fukutawara Station	福俵駅（ふくたわら）
Fukuura Station	福浦駅（ふくうら）
Fukuwatari Station	福渡駅（ふくわたり）
Fukuyama Station	福山駅（ふくやま）
Fukuyoshi Station	福吉駅（ふくよし）
Fukuyō Station	福用駅（ふくよう）
Fukuzumi Station	福住駅（ふくずみ）
Fuminosato Station	文の里駅（ふみのさと）
Funabashi Station	船橋駅（ふなばし）
Funabashi-Hōten Station	船橋法典駅（ふなばしほうてん）
Funabashi-Keibajō Station	船橋競馬場駅（ふなばしけいばじょう）
Funabashi-Nichidaimae Station	船橋日大前駅（ふなばしにちだいまえ）
Funabori Station	船堀駅（ふなぼり）
Funagata Station	舟形駅（ふながた）
Funahirayama Station	船平山駅（ふなひらやま）
Funairi-hon-machi Station	舟入本町駅（ふないりほんまち）
Funairi-kawaguchi-chō Station	舟入川口町駅（ふないりかわぐちちょう）
Funairi-machi Station	舟入町駅（ふないりまち）
Funairi-minami-machi Station	舟入南町駅（ふないりみなみまち）
Funairi-saiwai-chō Station	舟入幸町駅（ふないりさいわいちょう）
Funakoshi Station	船越駅（ふなこし）
Funamachi Station	船町駅（ふなまち）
Funamachiguchi Station	船町口駅（ふなまちぐち）
Funao Station (Fukuoka)	船尾駅（ふなお）
Funaoka Station (Kyoto)	船岡駅 (京都府)（ふなおか）
Funaoka Station (Miyagi)	船岡駅 (宮城県)（ふなおか）
Funasa Station	船佐駅（ふなさ）
Funato Station	船戸駅（ふなと）
Funatsu Station (Kihoku, Mie)	船津駅 (三重県紀北町)（ふなつ）
Funatsu Station (Toba, Mie)	船津駅 (三重県鳥羽市)（ふなつ）
Funehiki Station	船引駅（ふねひき）
Fūren Station	風連駅（ふうれん）
Furano Station	富良野駅（ふらの）
Fureai-Shōriki Station	ふれあい生力駅（ふれあいしょうりき）
Furudate Station	古館駅（ふるだて）
Furue Station	古江駅（ふるえ）
Furugō Station	古国府駅（ふるごう）
Furuichi Station (Hiroshima)	古市駅 (広島県)（ふるいち）
Furuichi Station (Hyōgo)	古市駅 (兵庫県)（ふるいち）
Furuichi Station (Osaka)	古市駅 (大阪府)（ふるいち）
Furuichibashi Station	古市橋駅（ふるいちばし）
Furujima Station	古島駅（ふるじま）
Furukawa Station	古川駅（ふるかわ）
Furukawabashi Station	古川橋駅（ふるかわばし）
Furukuchi Station	古口駅（ふるくち）
Furuma Station	古間駅（ふるま）
Furusan Station	古山駅（ふるさん）
Furusatokōen Station	ふるさと公園駅（ふるさとこうえん）
Furuse Station	古瀬駅（ふるせ）
Furushō Station	古庄駅（ふるしょう）
Furu-Takamatsu Station	古高松駅（ふるたかまつ）
Furutakamatsu-Minami Station	古高松南駅（ふるたかまつみなみ）
Furutsu Station	古津駅（ふるつ）
Fusa Station	布佐駅（ふさ）
Fusamoto Station	総元駅（ふさもと）
Fusazaki Station	房前駅（ふさざき）
Fuse Station	布施駅（ふせ）
Fuseishi Station	伏石駅（ふせいし）
Fushiki Station	伏木駅（ふしき）
Fushimi Station (Aichi)	伏見駅 (愛知県)（ふしみ）
Fushimi Station (Kyoto)	伏見駅 (京都府)（ふしみ）
Fushimi-Inari Station	伏見稲荷駅（ふしみいなり）
Fushimi-Momoyama Station	伏見桃山駅（ふしみももやま）
Fushiya Station	伏屋駅（ふしや）
Fusō Station	扶桑駅（ふそう）
Fussa Station	福生駅(ふっさ)
Futaba Station	双葉駅（ふたば）
Futada Station	二田駅（ふただ）
Futagawa Station	二川駅（ふたがわ）
Futago Station	二子駅（ふたご）
Futaiwa Station	双岩駅（ふたいわ）
Futajima Station	二島駅（ふたじま）
Futako-Shinchi Station	二子新地駅（ふたこしんち）
Futako-Tamagawa Station	二子玉川駅（ふたこたまがわ）
Futamata Station (Hokkaido)	二股駅（ふたまた）
Futamata Station (Kyoto)	二俣駅（ふたまた）
Futamata-gawa Station	二俣川駅（ふたまたがわ）
Futamata-Hommachi Station	二俣本町駅（ふたまたほんまち）
Futamatao Station	二俣尾駅（ふたまたお）
Futamata-Shimmachi Station	二俣新町駅（ふたまたしんまち）
Futaminoura Station	二見浦駅（ふたみのうら）
Futana Station	二名駅（ふたな）
Futatsui Station	二ツ井駅（ふたつい）
Futatsuiri Station	二ツ杁駅（ふたついり）
Futatsuka Station	二塚駅（ふたつか）
Futawa-Mukōdai Station	二和向台駅（ふたわむこうだい）
Futo Station	富戸駅（ふと）
Futomi Station (Chiba)	太海駅（ふとみ）
Futomi Station (Hokkaido)	太美駅（ふとみ）
Futsukaichi Station	二日市駅（ふつかいち）
Fuwa-Ishiki Station	不破一色駅（ふわいしき）
Fuya Station	府屋駅（ふや）
Fuzokuchūgakumae Station	附属中学前駅（ふぞくちゅうがくまえ）
