= List of railway stations in Japan: E =

List of railway stations in Japan

A	B	C	D	E	F	G	H	I	J	KL	M	N	O	P	R	S	T	U	W	Y	Z

This list shows the railway stations in Japan that begin with the letter E. This is a subset of the full list of railway stations in Japan.

== Station list ==
Eba Station	江波駅（えば）
Ebara Station	江原駅（えばら）
Ebaramachi Station	荏原町駅（えばらまち）
Ebara-Nakanobu Station	荏原中延駅（えばらなかのぶ）
Ebata Station	江端駅（えばた）
Ebeotsu Station	江部乙駅（えべおつ）
Ebetsu Station	江別駅（えべつ）
Ebi Station	江尾駅（えび）
Ebie Station	海老江駅（えびえ）
Ebina Station	海老名駅（えびな）
Ebino Station	えびの駅
Ebino-Iino Station	えびの飯野駅（えびのいいの）
Ebino-Uwae Station	えびの上江駅（えびのうわえ）
Ebisu Station (Hyogo)	恵比須駅（えびす）
Ebisu Station (Tokyo)	恵比寿駅（えびす）
Ebisuchō Station (Osaka)	恵美須町駅（えびすちょう）
Ebisuchō Station (Hiroshima)	胡町駅（えびすちょう）
Ebitsu Station	海老津駅（えびつ）
Echigawa Station	愛知川駅（えちがわ）
Echigo-Akatsuka Station	越後赤塚駅（えちごあかつか）
Echigo-Hayakawa Station	越後早川駅（えちごはやかわ）
Echigo-Hirose Station	越後広瀬駅（えちごひろせ）
Echigo-Hirota Station	越後広田駅（えちごひろた）
Echigo-Horinouchi Station	越後堀之内駅（えちごほりのうち）
Echigo-Ishiyama Station	越後石山駅（えちごいしやま）
Echigo-Iwasawa Station	越後岩沢駅（えちごいわさわ）
Echigo-Iwatsuka Station	越後岩塚駅（えちごいわつか）
Echigo-Kanamaru Station	越後金丸駅（えちごかなまる）
Echigo-Kangawa Station	越後寒川駅（えちごかんがわ）
Echigo-Katakai Station	越後片貝駅（えちごかたかい）
Echigo-Kawaguchi Station	越後川口駅（えちごかわぐち）
Echigo-Mizusawa Station	越後水沢駅（えちごみずさわ）
Echigo-Nakazato Station	越後中里駅（えちごなかざと）
Echigo Oshiage Hisui Kaigan Station	えちご押上ひすい海岸駅（えちごおしあげひすいかいがん）
Echigo-Ōshima Station	越後大島駅（えちごおおしま）
Echigo-Shikawatari Station	越後鹿渡駅（えちごしかわたり）
Echigo-Shimoseki Station	越後下関駅（えちごしもせき）
Echigo-Sone Station	越後曽根駅（えちごそね）
Echigo-Suhara Station	越後須原駅（えちごすはら）
Echigo-Takiya Station	越後滝谷駅（えちごたきや）
Echigo-Tanaka Station	越後田中駅（えちごたなか）
Echigo-Tazawa Station	越後田沢駅（えちごたざわ）
Echigo-Yuzawa Station	越後湯沢駅（えちごゆざわ）
Echizen-Ōmiya Station	越前大宮駅（えちぜんおおみや）
Echizen-Ōno Station	越前大野駅（えちぜんおおの）
Echizen-Hanandō Station	越前花堂駅（えちぜんはなんどう）
Echizen-Kaihotsu Station	越前開発駅（えちぜんかいほつ）
Echizen-Nonaka Station	越前野中駅（えちぜんのなか）
Echizen-Shimabashi Station	越前島橋駅（えちぜんしまばし）
Echizen-Shimoyama Station	越前下山駅（えちぜんしもやま）
Echizen-Shinbo Station	越前新保駅（えちぜんしんぼ）
Echizen-Takada Station	越前高田駅（えちぜんたかだ）
Echizen-Takefu Station	越前たけふ駅（えちぜんたけふ）
Echizen-Takehara Station	越前竹原駅（えちぜんたけはら）
Echizen-Tano Station	越前田野駅（えちぜんたの）
Echizen-Tomida Station	越前富田駅（えちぜんとみだ）
Echizen-Tōgō Station	越前東郷駅（えちぜんとうごう）
Echizen-Yakushi Station	越前薬師駅（えちぜんやくし）
Eda Station (Fukushima)	江田駅 (福島県)（えだ）
Eda Station (Kanagawa)	江田駅 (神奈川県)（えだ）
Edagawa Station	枝川駅（えだがわ）
Edamitsu Station	枝光駅（えだみつ）
Edobashi Station	江戸橋駅（えどばし）
Edogawa Station	江戸川駅（えどがわ）
Edogawabashi Station	江戸川橋駅（えどがわばし）
Edogawadai Station	江戸川台駅（えどがわだい）
Eganoshō Station	恵我ノ荘駅（えがのしょう）
Egi Station	江木駅（えぎ）
Egira Station	江吉良駅（えぎら）
Eguchi Station	江口駅（えぐち）
Ei Station	頴娃駅（えい）
Eifukuchō Station	永福町駅（えいふくちょう）
Eigashima Station	江井ヶ島駅（えいがしま）
Eiheijiguchi Station	永平寺口駅（えいへいじぐち）
Einomaru Station	永犬丸駅（えいのまる）
Ei-Ōkawa Station	頴娃大川駅（えいおおかわ）
Eiwa Station	永和駅（えいわ）
Ejima Station	江島駅（えじま）
Ekaku Station	永覚駅（えかく）
Ekawasaki Station	江川崎駅（えかわさき）
Ekihigashi Park Station	駅東公園前停留場（えきひがしこうえんまえ）
Ekimae Station	駅前駅（えきまえ）
Ekimae-Ōdōri Station	駅前大通駅（えきまえおおどおり）
Ekiya Station	駅家駅（えきや）
Ekoda Station	江古田駅（えこだ）
Emi Station	江見駅（えみ）
Emmachi Station	円町駅（えんまち）
Emukae-Shikamachi Station	江迎鹿町駅（えむかえしかまち）
Ena Station	恵那駅（えな）
Enai Station	榎井駅（えない）
Enden Station	円田駅（えんでん）
Endō Station	渕東駅（えんどう）
Engaru Station	遠軽駅（えんがる）
Engyōjiguchi Station	円行寺口駅（えんぎょうじぐち）
Eniwa Station	恵庭駅（えにわ）
Enkōbashi-chō Station	猿猴橋町駅（えんこうばし）
Enokido Station (Aichi)	榎戸駅 (愛知県)（えのきど）
Enokido Station (Chiba)	榎戸駅 (千葉県)（えのきど）
Enokimachi Station	榎町駅（えのきまち）
Enokimoto Station	榎本駅（えのきもと）
Enoshima Station	江ノ島駅（えのしま）
Enoura Station	江の浦駅（えのうら）
Enshū-byōin Station	遠州病院駅（えんしゅうびょういん）
Enshū-Gansuiji Station	遠州岩水寺駅（えんしゅうがんすいじ）
Enshū-Hikuma Station	遠州曳馬駅（えんしゅうひくま）
Enshū-Kamijima Station	遠州上島駅（えんしゅうかみじま）
Enshū-Kobayashi Station	遠州小林駅（えんしゅうこばやし）
Enshū-Komatsu Station	遠州小松駅（えんしゅうこまつ）
Enshū-Mori Station	遠州森駅（えんしゅうもり）
Enshū-Nishigasaki Station	遠州西ヶ崎駅（えんしゅうにしがさき）
Enshū-Shibamoto Station	遠州芝本駅（えんしゅうしばもと）
Entoku Station	延徳駅（えんとく）
Enza Station	円座駅（えんざ）
Enzan Station	塩山駅（えんざん）
Era Station	恵良駅（えら）
Erinono Station	襟野々駅（えりのの）
Esaka Station	江坂駅（えさか）
Esaki Station	江崎駅（えさき）
Esojima Station	江曽島駅（えそじま）
Esumi Station	江住駅（えすみ）
Etchū-Daimon Station	越中大門駅（えっちゅうだいもん）
Etchū-Ebara Station	越中荏原駅（えっちゅうえばら）
Etchū-Funahashi Station	越中舟橋駅（えっちゅうふなはし）
Etchū-Izumi Station	越中泉駅（えっちゅういずみ）
Etchūjima Station	越中島駅（えっちゅうじま）
Etchū-Kokubu Station	越中国分駅（えっちゅうこくぶ）
Etchū-Miyazaki Station	越中宮崎駅（えっちゅうみやざき）
Etchū-Nakagawa Station	越中中川駅（えっちゅうなかがわ）
Etchū-Nakajima Station	越中中島駅（えっちゅうなかじま）
Etchū-Nakamura Station	越中中村駅（えっちゅうなかむら）
Etchū-Sangō Station	越中三郷駅（えっちゅうさんごう）
Etchū-Yamada Station	越中山田駅（えっちゅうやまだ）
Etchū-Yatsuo Station	越中八尾駅（えっちゅうやつお）
Ezuriko Station	江釣子駅（えづりこ）
