= List of railway stations in Japan: G =

List of railway stations in Japan

A	B	C	D	E	F	G	H	I	J	KL	M	N	O	P	R	S	T	U	W	Y	Z

This list shows the railway stations in Japan that begin with the letter G. This is a subset of the full list of railway stations in Japan.

== Station list ==
Gaienmae Station	外苑前駅（がいえんまえ）
Gakken Kita-Ikoma Station	学研北生駒駅（がっけんきたいこま）
Gakken Nara-Tomigaoka Station	学研奈良登美ヶ丘駅（がっけんならとみがおか）
Gakkōmae Station	学校前駅 (福岡県)（がっこうまえ）
Gaku Station	学駅（がく）
Gakuden Station (Hokkaido)	学田駅（がくでん）
Gakuden Station (Aichi)	楽田駅（がくでん）
Gakuen-dōri Station	学園通り駅（がくえんどおり）
Gakuen-mae Station (Chiba)	学園前駅 (千葉県)（がくえんまえ）
Gakuen-mae Station (Hokkaido)	学園前駅 (北海道)（がくえんまえ）
Gakuen-mae Station (Nara)	学園前駅 (奈良県)（がくえんまえ）
Gakuentoshi Station	学園都市駅（がくえんとし）
Gakugeidaigaku Station	学芸大学駅（がくげいだいがく）
Gakumon Station	学門駅（がくもん）
Gakunan-Enoo Station	岳南江尾駅（がくなんえのお）
Gakunan-Fujioka Station	岳南富士岡駅（がくなんふじおか）
Gakunan-Harada Station	岳南原田駅（がくなんはらだ）
Gakushūin-shita Station	学習院下駅（がくしゅういんした）
Gala-Yuzawa Station	ガーラ湯沢駅（がーらゆざわ）
Gamagōri Station	蒲郡駅（がまごおり）
Gamagōri-kyōteijō-mae Station	蒲郡競艇場前駅（がまごおりきょうていじょうまえ）
Gamō Station	蒲生駅（がもう）
Gamō-yonchōme Station	蒲生四丁目駅（がもうよんちょうめ）
Ganda Station	感田駅（がんだ）
Gannosu Station	雁ノ巣駅（がんのす）
Gansuiji Station	岩水寺駅（がんすいじ）
Gatsugi Station	勝木駅（がつぎ）
Geba Station	下馬駅（げば）
Geibikei Station	猊鼻渓駅（げいびけい）
Geidaidōri Station	芸大通駅（げいだいどおり）
Gejō Station	下条駅（げじょう）
Gekkōji Station	月江寺駅（げっこうじ）
Gembudō Station	玄武洞駅（げんぶどう）
Genbaku Dome-mae Station (Atomic Bomb Dome)	原爆ドーム前駅（げんばくどーむまえ）
Gendōji Station	源道寺駅（げんどうじ）
Genjiinomori Station	源じいの森駅（げんじいのもり）
Genseikaen Station	原生花園駅（げんせいかえん）
Gero Station	下呂駅（げろ）
Gibo Station	儀保駅（ぎぼ）
Gifu Station	岐阜駅（ぎふ）
Gifu-Hashima Station	岐阜羽島駅（ぎふはしま）
Gijukukōkōmae Station	義塾高校前駅（ぎじゅくこうこうまえ）
Ginan Station	岐南駅（ぎなん）
Ginsui Station	銀水駅（ぎんすい）
Ginza Station	銀座駅（ぎんざ）
Ginza-itchōme Station	銀座一丁目駅（ぎんざいっちょうめ）
Ginzan Station	銀山駅（ぎんざん）
Gion Station (Chiba)	祗園駅 (千葉県)（ぎおん）
Gion Station (Fukuoka)	祇園駅 (福岡県)（ぎおん）
Gion-Shijō Station	祇園四条駅（ぎおんしじょう）
Gion-shimbashikita Station	祇園新橋北駅（ぎおんしんばしきた）
Gōbara Station	郷原駅（ごうばら）
Gōbira Station	江平駅（ごうびら）
Gobō Station	御坊駅（ごぼう）
Gochaku Station	御着駅（ごちゃく）
Gochi Station	五知駅（ごち）
Godai Station	後台駅（ごだい）
Gōdo Station (Gifu)	顔戸駅（ごうど）
Gōdo Station (Fukushima)	郷戸駅（ごうど）
Gōdo Station (Gunma)	神戸駅 (群馬県)（ごうど）
Gofukumachi Station (Fukuoka)	呉服町駅（ごふくまち）
Gofukumachi Station (Kumamoto)	呉服町停留場（ごふくまち）
Gohyakugawa Station	五百川駅（ごひゃくがわ）
Gohyakurakan Station	五百羅漢駅（ごひゃくらかん）
Goi Station	五井駅（ごい）
Goidō Station	五位堂駅（ごいどう）
Goino Station	五位野駅（ごいの）
Gojikkoku Station	五十石駅（ごじっこく）
Gojō Station (Kyoto)	五条駅 (京都府)（ごじょう）
Gojō Station (Nara)	五条駅 (奈良県)（ごじょう）
Gōkaku Station	合格駅（ごうかく）
Gokan Station	後閑駅（ごかん）
Gokashō Station	五箇荘駅（ごかしょう）
Gōkei Station	豪渓駅（ごうけい）
Gokiso Station	御器所駅（ごきそ）
Gokō Station	五香駅（ごこう）
Gokokuji Station	護国寺駅（ごこくじ）
Gokurakubashi Station	極楽橋駅（ごくらくばし）
Gokurakuji Station	極楽寺駅（ごくらくじ）
Goma Station	胡麻駅（ごま）
Gomen Station	後免駅（ごめん）
Gomenmachi Station	後免町駅（ごめんまち）
Gondō Station	権堂駅（ごんどう）
Gongenmae Station	権現前駅（ごんげんまえ）
Gongenzaki Station	権現崎駅（ごんげんざき）
Gonosan Station	五ノ三駅（ごのさん）
Gonōkōmae Station	五農校前駅（ごのうこうまえ）
Gōra Station	強羅駅（ごうら）
Gorō Station	五郎駅（ごろう）
Gorōmaru Station	五郎丸駅（ごろうまる）
Goryō Station (Hiroshima)	御領駅 (広島県)（ごりょう）
Goryō Station (Kagoshima)	御領駅 (鹿児島県)（ごりょう）
Goryōkaku Station	五稜郭駅（ごりょうかく）
Goryōmae Station	御陵前停留場（ごりょうまえ）
Gosannen Station	後三年駅（ごさんねん）
Gōsawa Station	郷沢駅（ごうさわ）
Gose Station	御所駅（ごせ）
Gosen Station	五泉駅（ごせん）
Gosha Station	五社駅（ごしゃ）
Gōshi Station	剛志駅（ごうし）
Goshogawara Station	五所川原駅（ごしょがわら）
Gotanda Station	五反田駅（ごたんだ）
Gotanno Station	五反野駅（ごたんの）
Gotemba Station	御殿場駅（ごてんば）
Gotenyama Station	御殿山駅（ごてんやま）
Gotō Station	後藤駅（ごとう）
Gōtokuji Station	豪徳寺駅（ごうとくじ）
Gōtsu Station	江津駅（ごうつ）
Gōtsuhommachi Station	江津本町駅（ごうつほんまち）
Goyu Station	御油駅（ごゆ）
Green Stadium Station	グリーンスタジアム前停留場（ぐりーんすたじあむまえ）
Gudō Station	具同駅（ぐどう）
Gujō Station	公庄駅（ぐじょう）
Gujō-Hachiman Station	郡上八幡駅（ぐじょうはちまん）
Gujō-Yamato Station	郡上大和駅（ぐじょうやまと）
Gumyō Station	求名駅（ぐみょう）
Gumyōji Station (Yokohama Subway)	弘明寺駅 (横浜市営地下鉄)（ぐみょうじ）
Gumyōji Station (Keikyu)	弘明寺駅 (京急)（ぐみょうじ）
Gunchū Station	郡中駅（ぐんちゅう）
Gunchū Port Station	郡中港駅（ぐんちゅうこう）
Gunma-Fujioka Station	群馬藤岡駅（ぐんまふじおか）
Gunma-Haramachi Station	群馬原町駅（ぐんまはらまち）
Gunma-Ōtsu Station	群馬大津駅（ぐんまおおつ）
Gunma-Sōja Station	群馬総社駅（ぐんまそうじゃ）
Gunma-Yawata Station	群馬八幡駅（ぐんまやわた）
Gyokukeijimae Station	玉桂寺前駅（ぎょくけいじまえ）
Gyōda Station	行田駅（ぎょうだ）
Gyōdashi Station	行田市駅（ぎょうだし）
Gyōtoku Station	行徳駅（ぎょうとく）
