= List of railway stations in Japan: U =

List of railway stations in Japan

A	B	C	D	E	F	G	H	I	J	KL	M	N	O	P	R	S	T	U	W	Y	Z

This list shows the railway stations in Japan that begin with the letter U. This is a subset of the full list of railway stations in Japan.

== Station list ==
Ubadō Station	姥堂駅（うばどう）
Ubara Station	鵜原駅（うばら）
Ubashima Station	祖母島駅（うばしま）
Ube Station	宇部駅（うべ）
Ubemisaki Station	宇部岬駅（うべみさき）
Ube-Shinkawa Station	宇部新川駅（うべしんかわ）
Uchida Station	内田駅（うちだ）
Uchide Station	打出駅（うちで）
Uchigamaki Station	内ヶ巻駅（うちがまき）
Uchigō Station	内郷駅（うちごう）
Uchigoshi Station	打越駅（うちごし）
Uchihara Station	内原駅（うちはら）
Uchijuku Station	内宿駅（うちじゅく）
Uchiko Station	内子駅（うちこ）
Uchina Station	内名駅（うちな）
Uchinada Station	内灘駅（うちなだ）
Uchino Station	内野駅（うちの）
Uchinoda Station	内之田駅（うちのだ）
Uchinomaki Station	内牧駅（うちのまき）
Uchino-Nishigaoka Station	内野西が丘駅（うちのにしがおか）
Uchisaiwaichō Station	内幸町駅（うちさいわいちょう）
Uchita Station	打田駅（うちた）
Uchiumi Station	内海駅 (宮崎県)（うちうみ）
Uchiyama Station	内山駅（うちやま）
Udono Station	鵜殿駅（うどの）
Uebayashi Station	上林駅（うえばやし）
Ueda Station (Aichi)	植田駅 (名古屋市)（うえだ）
Ueda Station (Fukushima)	植田駅 (福島県)（うえだ）
Ueda Station (Nagano)	上田駅（うえだ）
Uedahara Station	上田原駅（うえだはら）
Uedai Station	植大駅（うえだい）
Ueki Station	植木駅（うえき）
Uematsu Station	植松駅（うえまつ）
Uemura Station	植村駅（うえむら）
Uenae Station	植苗駅（うえなえ）
Ueno Station	上野駅（うえの）
Ueno Dōbutsuen Higashien Station	上野動物園東園駅（うえのどうぶつえんひがしえん）
Ueno Dōbutsuen Nishien Station	上野動物園西園駅（うえのどうぶつえんにしえん）
Uenohara Station	上野原駅（うえのはら）
Ueno-Hirokōji Station	上野広小路駅（うえのひろこうじ）
Ueno-Okachimachi Station	上野御徒町駅（うえのおかちまち）
Uenoshi Station	上野市駅（うえのし）
Uenoshiba Station	上野芝駅（うえのしば）
Ueta Station	植田駅 (愛知県豊橋市)（うえた）
Ugata Station	鵜方駅（うがた）
Uge Station	有家駅 (岩手県)（うげ）
Ugo-Honjō Station	羽後本荘駅（うごほんじょう）
Ugo-Iizuka Station	羽後飯塚駅（うごいいづか）
Ugo-Iwaya Station	羽後岩谷駅（うごいわや）
Ugo-Kameda Station	羽後亀田駅（うごかめだ）
Ugo-Nagano Station	羽後長野駅（うごながの）
Ugo-Nagatoro Station	羽後長戸呂駅（うごながとろ）
Ugo-Nakazato Station	羽後中里駅（うごなかざと）
Ugo-Ōta Station	羽後太田駅（うごおおた）
Ugo-Sakai Station	羽後境駅（うごさかい）
Ugo-Ushijima Station	羽後牛島駅（うごうしじま）
Ugo-Yotsuya Station	羽後四ツ屋駅（うごよつや）
Uguisudani Station	鶯谷駅（うぐいすだに）
Uguisuno Station	鶯野駅（うぐいすの）
Uguisunomori Station	鶯の森駅（うぐいすのもり）
Uguisuzawa Station	鶯沢駅（うぐいすざわ）
Uguisuzawa Kōgyōkōkō Mae Station	鶯沢工業高校前駅（うぐいすざわこうぎょうこうこうまえ）
Ugusu Station	鶯巣駅（うぐす）
Uji Station (JR West)	宇治駅 (JR西日本)（うじ）
Uji Station (Keihan)	宇治駅 (京阪)（うじ）
Ujiie Station	氏家駅（うじいえ）
Ujina 2-chōme Station	宇品二丁目駅（うじなにちょうめ）
Ujina 3-chōme Station	宇品三丁目駅（うじなさんちょうめ）
Ujina 4-chōme Station	宇品四丁目駅（うじなよんちょうめ）
Ujina 5-chōme Station	宇品五丁目駅（うじなごちょうめ）
Ujina Station	広島港駅（ひろしまこう（うじな））
Ujiyamada Station	宇治山田駅（うじやまだ）
Ukahongō Station	宇賀本郷駅（うかほんごう）
Ukai Station	鵜飼駅 (広島県)（うかい）
Ukawa Station	鵜川駅（うかわ）
Ukiana Station	浮孔駅（うきあな）
Ukibuchi Station	浮鞭駅（うきぶち）
Ukiha Station	うきは駅
Ukimafunado Station	浮間舟渡駅（うきまふなど）
Ukishimachō Station	浮島町駅（うきしまちょう）
Ukui Station	宇久井駅（うくい）
Umahori Station	馬堀駅（うまほり）
Umamichi Station	馬道駅（うまみち）
Umatate Station	馬立駅（うまたて）
Umebayashi Station	梅林駅 (福岡県)（うめばやし）
Umeda Station	梅田駅（うめだ）
Umedoi Station	梅戸井駅（うめどい）
Umegadani Station	梅ヶ谷駅（うめがだに）
Umegaoka Station	梅ヶ丘駅（うめがおか）
Umegasawa Station	梅ヶ沢駅（うめがさわ）
Umegatō Station	梅ヶ峠駅（うめがとう）
Umejima Station	梅島駅（うめじま）
Umekōji-Kyōtonishi Station	梅小路京都西駅（うめこうじきょうとにし）
Umenomoto Station	梅本駅（うめのもと）
Umesato Station	梅郷駅（うめさと）
Umetsubo Station	梅坪駅（うめつぼ）
Umeyama Station	梅山駅（うめやま）
Umeyashiki Station (Nara)	梅屋敷駅 (奈良県)（うめやしき）
Umeyashiki Station (Tokyo)	梅屋敷駅 (東京都)（うめやしき）
Umezako Station	梅迫駅（うめざこ）
Umi Station	宇美駅（うみ）
Umijiri Station	海尻駅（うみじり）
Uminokōen Minamiguchi Station	海の公園南口駅（うみのこうえんみなみぐち）
Uminokōen Shibaguchi Station	海の公園柴口駅（うみのこうえんしばぐち）
Uminokuchi Station	海ノ口駅（うみのくち）
Uminonakamichi Station	海ノ中道駅（うみのなかみち）
Uminoōmukae Station	海の王迎駅（うみのおうむかえ）
Uminoura Station	海浦駅（うみのうら）
Umishibaura Station	海芝浦駅（うみしばうら）
Unazuki Station	宇奈月駅（うなづき）
Unazukionsen Station	宇奈月温泉駅（うなづきおんせん）
Undōkōen Station (Gunma)	運動公園駅 (群馬県)（うんどうこうえん）
Undōkōen Station (Miyazaki)	運動公園駅 (宮崎県)（うんどうこうえん）
Undōkōenmae Station (Aomori)	運動公園前駅（うんどうこうえんまえ）
Une Station	有年駅（うね）
Unebi Station	畝傍駅（うねび）
Unebi-Goryōmae Station	畝傍御陵前駅（うねびごりょうまえ）
Uneno Station	畦野駅（うねの）
Unga Station	運河駅（うんが）
Universal City Station	ユニバーサルシティ駅
Uno Station	宇野駅（うの）
Unobe Station	宇野辺駅（うのべ）
Unoke Station	宇野気駅（うのけ）
Unoki Station	鵜の木駅（うのき）
Unomachi Station	卯之町駅（うのまち）
Unoshima Station	宇島駅（うのしま）
Unosumai Station	鵜住居駅（うのすまい）
Unsenji Station	雲泉寺駅（うんせんじ）
Unshū-Hirata Station	雲州平田駅（うんしゅうひらた）
Unuma Station	鵜沼駅（うぬま）
Unumajuku Station	鵜沼宿駅（うぬまじゅく）
Uonuma-Kyūryō Station	魚沼丘陵駅（うおぬまきゅうりょう）
Uonuma-Nakajō Station	魚沼中条駅（うおぬまなかじょう）
Uonuma-Tanaka Station	魚沼田中駅（うおぬまたなか）
Uozaki Station	魚崎駅（うおざき）
Uozu Station	魚津駅（うおづ）
Uozumi Station	魚住駅（うおずみ）
Urada Station	浦田駅 (岡山県)（うらだ）
Uraga Station	浦賀駅（うらが）
Uragawara Station	うらがわら駅
Urahoro Station	浦幌駅（うらほろ）
Urakami Station	浦上駅（うらかみ）
Urakamiekimae Station	浦上駅前駅（うらかみえきまえ）
Urakawa Station (Hokkaido)	浦河駅（うらかわ）
Urakawa Station (Shizuoka)	浦川駅（うらかわ）
Uramoto Station	浦本駅（うらもと）
Uranosaki Station	浦ノ崎駅（うらのさき）
Urasa Station	浦佐駅（うらさ）
Urashuku Station	浦宿駅（うらしゅく）
Urasoe-Maeda Station	浦添前田駅（うらそえまえだ）
Urata Station	浦田駅 (福岡県)（うらた）
Urausu Station	浦臼駅（うらうす）
Urawa Station	浦和駅（うらわ）
Urawa-Misono Station	浦和美園駅（うらわみその）
Urayama Station	浦山駅（うらやま）
Urayamaguchi Station	浦山口駅（うらやまぐち）
Urayasu Station (Chiba)	浦安駅 (千葉県)（うらやす）
Urayasu Station (Tottori)	浦安駅 (鳥取県)（うらやす）
Ureshino-onsen Station	嬉野温泉駅（うれしのおんせん）
Urizura Station	瓜連駅（うりづら）
Urushiyama Station	漆山駅 (山形県)（うるしやま）
Usa Station	宇佐駅（うさ）
Usami Station	宇佐美駅（うさみ）
Ushibuchi Station	牛渕駅（うしぶち）
Ushibuchidanchi-mae Station	牛渕団地前駅（うしぶちだんちまえ）
Ushida Station (Aichi)	牛田駅 (愛知県)（うしだ）
Ushida Station (Tokyo)	牛田駅 (東京都)（うしだ）
Ushizu Station	牛津駅（うしづ）
Ushigome-Kagurazaka Station	牛込神楽坂駅（うしごめかぐらざか）
Ushigome-Yanagichō Station	牛込柳町駅（うしごめやなぎちょう）
Ushihama Station	牛浜駅（うしはま）
Ushiku Station	牛久駅（うしく）
Ushikubo Station	牛久保駅（うしくぼ）
Ushinohama Station	牛ノ浜駅（うしのはま）
Ushinoshima Station	牛島駅（うしのしま）
Ushinoya Station	牛ノ谷駅（うしのや）
Ushio Station	潮駅（うしお）
Ushirogata Station	後潟駅（うしろがた）
Ushita Station	牛田駅 (広島県)（うした）
Ushiyama Station	牛山駅（うしやま）
Usu Station	有珠駅（うす）
Usuda Station	臼田駅（うすだ）
Usugi Station	鵜杉駅（うすぎ）
Usuki Station (Kagoshima)	宇宿駅（うすき）
Usuki Station (Oita)	臼杵駅（うすき）
Utagō Station	宇田郷駅（うたごう）
Utanai Station	歌内駅（うたない）
Utano Station	宇多野駅（うたの）
Utatsu Station	歌津駅（うたつ）
Utazu Station	宇多津駅（うたづ）
Uto Station	宇土駅（うと）
Utoma Station	鵜苫駅（うとま）
Utō Station	宇頭駅（うとう）
Utsube Station	内部駅（うつべ）
Utsubo Station	打保駅（うつぼ）
Utsubuna Station	内船駅（うつぶな）
Utsuigawa Station	打井川駅（うついがわ）
Utsumi Station	内海駅 (愛知県)（うつみ）
Utsunomiya Station	宇都宮駅（うつのみや）
Utsunomiya Kamotsu Terminal Station	宇都宮貨物ターミナル駅（うつのみやかもつたーみなる）
Utsunomiya Station East Station	宇都宮駅東口停留場（うつのみやえきひがしぐち）
Utsunomiya University Yoto Campus Station	宇都宮大学陽東キャンパス停留場（うつのみやだいがくようとうきゃんぱす）
Utsutsugawa Station	現川駅（うつつがわ）
Uwagoromo Station	上挙母駅（うわごろも）
Uwajima Station	宇和島駅（うわじま）
Uyagawa Station	敬川駅（うやがわ）
Uzen-Chitose Station	羽前千歳駅（うぜんちとせ）
Uzen-Kanezawa Station	羽前金沢駅（うぜんかねざわ）
Uzen-Komatsu Station	羽前小松駅（うぜんこまつ）
Uzen-Matsuoka Station	羽前松岡駅（うぜんまつおか）
Uzen-Mizusawa Station	羽前水沢駅（うぜんみずさわ）
Uzen-Nagasaki Station	羽前長崎駅（うぜんながさき）
Uzen-Nakayama Station	羽前中山駅（うぜんなかやま）
Uzen-Narita Station	羽前成田駅（うぜんなりた）
Uzen-Numazawa Station	羽前沼沢駅（うぜんぬまざわ）
Uzen-Ōyama Station	羽前大山駅（うぜんおおやま）
Uzen-Takamatsu Station	羽前高松駅（うぜんたかまつ）
Uzen-Toyosato Station	羽前豊里駅（うぜんとよさと）
Uzen-Tsubaki Station	羽前椿駅（うぜんつばき）
Uzen-Yamabe Station	羽前山辺駅（うぜんやまべ）
Uzen-Zennami Station	羽前前波駅（うぜんぜんなみ）
Uzui Station	宇都井駅（うづい）
Uzumasa Station	太秦駅（うずまさ）
Uzumasa-Kōryūji Station	太秦広隆寺駅（うずまさこうりゅうじ）
Uzumasa Tenjingawa Station	太秦天神川駅（うずまさてんじんがわ）
