= List of railway stations in Japan: J =

List of railway stations in Japan

A	B	C	D	E	F	G	H	I	J	KL	M	N	O	P	R	S	T	U	W	Y	Z

This list shows the railway stations in Japan that begin with the letter J. This is a subset of the full list of railway stations in Japan.

== Station list ==
JA Hiroshimabyouin-mae Station	JA広島病院前駅（じぇいえーひろしまびょういんまえ）
Jatco-mae Station	ジヤトコ前駅（じやとこまえ）
Jichi-idai Station	自治医大駅（じちいだい）
Jidōshagakkōmae Station	自動車学校前駅（じどうしゃがっこうまえ）
Jieitaimae Station	自衛隊前駅（じえいたいまえ）
Jifuku Station	地福駅（じふく）
Jigenji Station	慈眼寺駅（じげんじ）
Jigozen Station	地御前駅（じごぜん）
Jike Station	寺家駅（じけ）
Jikkokutōge Station	十国峠駅（じっこくとうげ）
Jikkokutōge-Noboriguchi Station	十国峠登り口駅（じっこくとうげのぼりぐち）
Jimba Station	陣場駅（じんば）
Jimbohara Station	神保原駅（じんぼはら）
Jimbōchō Station	神保町駅（じんぼうちょう）
Jimmachi Station	神町駅（じんまち）
Jimmuji Station	神武寺駅（じんむじ）
Jimokuji Station	甚目寺駅（じもくじ）
Jina Station	地名駅（じな）
Jin'aigurandomae Station	仁愛グランド前駅（じんあいぐらんどまえ）
Jin'ai Joshikōkō Station	仁愛女子高校駅（じんあいじょしこうこう）
Jindai Station	神代駅 (秋田県)（じんだい）
Jingūji Station	神宮寺駅（じんぐうじ）
Jingū-mae Station	神宮前駅（じんぐうまえ）
Jingū-Marutamachi Station	神宮丸太町駅（じんぐうまるたまち）
Jingūnishi Station	神宮西駅（じんぐうにし）
Jinnoharu Station	陣原駅（じんのはる）
Jinryō Station	神領駅（じんりょう）
Jiroenbashi Station	治良門橋駅（じろえんばし）
Jirōmaru Station	次郎丸駅（じろうまる）
Jiyūgaoka Station (Tokyo)	自由が丘駅（じゆうがおか）
Jiyūgaoka Station (Aichi)	自由ヶ丘駅（じゆうがおか）
Jizōbashi Station	地蔵橋駅（じぞうばし）
Jizōmachi Station	地蔵町駅（じぞうまち）
Jogakuin-mae Station	女学院前駅（じょがくいんまえ）
Johoku Station	城北駅（じょうほく）
Joshidai Station	女子大駅（じょしだい）
Jōei Station	常永駅（じょうえい）
Jōetsu-Kokusai Ski-jo-mae Station	上越国際スキー場前駅（じょうえつこくさいすきーじょうまえ）
Jōgasakikaigan Station	城ヶ崎海岸駅（じょうがさきかいがん）
Jōgawara Station	城川原駅（じょうがわら）
Jōge Station	上下駅（じょうげ）
Jōgehama Station	上下浜駅（じょうげはま）
Jōhana Station	城端駅（じょうはな）
Jōko Station	上戸駅 (福島県)（じょうこ）
Jōkōji Station	定光寺駅（じょうこうじ）
Jōmōkōgen Station	上毛高原駅（じょうもうこうげん）
Jōmon-Ogata Station	縄文小ヶ田駅（じょうもんおがた）
Jōno Station (JR Kyushu)	城野駅 (JR九州)（じょうの）
Jōno Station (Kitakyushu Monorail)	城野駅 (北九州高速鉄道)（じょうの）
Jōro Station	上呂駅（じょうろ）
Jōshin Station	浄心駅（じょうしん）
Jōshū-Fukushima Station	上州福島駅（じょうしゅうふくしま）
Jōshū-Ichinomiya Station	上州一ノ宮駅（じょうしゅういちのみや）
Jōshū-Nanokaichi Station	上州七日市駅（じょうしゅうなのかいち）
Jōshū-Niiya Station	上州新屋駅（じょうしゅうにいや）
Jōshū-Tomioka Station	上州富岡駅（じょうしゅうとみおか）
Jōsui Station	浄水駅（じょうすい）
Jōtō Station (Gunma)	城東駅（じょうとう）
Jōtō Station (Okayama)	上道駅 (岡山県)（じょうとう）
Jōyō Station	城陽駅（じょうよう）
JR-Awaji Station	JR淡路駅（じぇいあーるあわじ）
JR Fujinomori Station	JR藤森駅（じぇいあーるふじのもり）
JR Goidō Station	JR五位堂駅（じぇいあーるごいどう）
JR Kawachi-Eiwa Station	JR河内永和駅（じぇいあーるかわちえいわ）
JR Miyamaki Station	JR三山木駅（じぇいあーるみやまき）
JR Nagase Station	JR長瀬駅（じぇいあーるながせ）
JR Namba Station	JR難波駅（じぇいあーるなんば）
JR-Noe Station	JR野江駅（じぇいあーるのえ）
JR Ogura Station	JR小倉駅（じぇいあーるおぐら）
JR Shuntokumichi Station	JR俊徳道駅（じぇいあーるしゅんとくみち）
JR-Sōjiji Station	JR総持寺駅（じぇいあーるそうじじ）
Jūjō Station (Tokyo)	十条駅 (東京都)（じゅうじょう）
Jūjō Station (Kyoto Municipal Subway)	十条駅 (京都市営地下鉄)（じゅうじょう）
Jūjō Station (Kintetsu)	十条駅 (近鉄)（じゅうじょう）
Jūkujō Station	十九条駅（じゅうくじょう）
Jūmonji Station	十文字駅（じゅうもんじ）
Jūnikane Station	十二兼駅（じゅうにかね）
Jūniko Station	十二湖駅（じゅうにこ）
Jūnikyō Station	十二橋駅（じゅうにきょう）
Jūnisho Station	十二所駅（じゅうにしょ）
Jūō Station	十王駅（じゅうおう）
Jūsō Station	十三駅（じゅうそう）
J-Village Station	Jヴィレッジ駅（じぇいびれっじ）
