= List of railway stations in Japan: Y =

List of railway stations in Japan

| A | B | C | D | E | F | G | H | I | J | KL | M | N | O | P | R | S | T | U | W | Y | Z |

This list shows the railway stations in Japan that begin with the letter Y. This is a subset of the full list of railway stations in Japan.

== Station list ==
=== Ya ===
| Yabachō Station | 矢場町駅（やばちょう） |
| Yabara Station | 矢原駅（やばら） |
| Yabase Station | 八橋駅（やばせ） |
| Yabashira Station | 八柱駅（やばしら） |
| Yabe Station | 矢部駅（やべ） |
| Yabitsu Station | 矢美津駅（やびつ） |
| Yabu Station | 養父駅（やぶ） |
| Yabuhara Station | 藪原駅（やぶはら） |
| Yabukami Station | 藪神駅（やぶかみ） |
| Yabuki Station | 矢吹駅（やぶき） |
| Yabuzuka Station | 藪塚駅（やぶづか） |
| Yachihata Station | 谷地畑駅（やちはた） |
| Yachiho Station | 八千穂駅（やちほ） |
| Yachimata Station | 八街駅（やちまた） |
| Yachiyo-Chūō Station | 八千代中央駅（やちよちゅうおう） |
| Yachiyodai Station | 八千代台駅（やちよだい） |
| Yachiyo-Midorigaoka Station | 八千代緑が丘駅（やちよみどりがおか） |
| Yada Station | 矢田駅 (愛知県)（やだ） |
| Yadamae Station | 矢田前駅（やだまえ） |
| Yaenosato Station | 八戸ノ里駅（やえのさと） |
| Yaga Station (Kanagawa) | 谷峨駅（やが） |
| Yaga Station (Hiroshima) | 矢賀駅（やが） |
| Yagami Station | 矢神駅（やがみ） |
| Yagawa Station | 矢川駅（やがわ） |
| Yagawara Station | 谷河原駅（やがわら） |
| Yagi Station | 八木駅（やぎ） |
| Yagihara Station | 八木原駅（やぎはら） |
| Yagi-nishiguchi Station | 八木西口駅（やぎにしぐち） |
| Yagiri Station | 矢切駅（やぎり） |
| Yagisaki Station | 八木崎駅（やぎさき） |
| Yagisawa Station | 八木沢駅（やぎさわ） |
| Yagisawa Miyakotandai Station | 八木沢・宮古短大駅（やぎさわみやこたんだい） |
| Yagiyama Zoological Park Station | 八木山動物公園駅（やぎやまどうぶつこうえん） |
| Yagoshi Station | 矢越駅（やごし） |
| Yagoshima Station | 弥五島駅（やごしま） |
| Yagoto Station | 八事駅（やごと） |
| Yagotonisseki Station | 八事日赤駅（やごとにっせき） |
| Yaguchinowatashi Station | 矢口渡駅（やぐちのわたし） |
| Yagumadai Station | やぐま台駅（やぐまだい） |
| Yagura Station | 矢倉駅（やぐら） |
| Yagyū Station | 柳生駅（やぎゅう） |
| Yagyūbashi Station | 柳生橋駅（やぎゅうばし） |
| Yahaba Station | 矢幅駅（やはば） |
| Yahagi Station | 矢作駅（やはぎ） |
| Yahagibashi Station | 矢作橋駅（やはぎばし） |
| Yahata Station | 八幡駅 (福岡県)（やはた） |
| Yahiko Station | 弥彦駅（やひこ） |
| Yahiro Station | 八広駅（やひろ） |
| Yaho Station | 谷保駅（やほ） |
| Yairo Station | 八色駅（やいろ） |
| Yaita Station | 矢板駅（やいた） |
| Yaizu Station | 焼津駅（やいづ） |
| Yaka Station | 八家駅（やか） |
| Yakabe Station | 矢加部駅（やかべ） |
| Yakage Station | 矢掛駅（やかげ） |
| Yakawa Station | 八川駅（やかわ） |
| Yakeishi Station | 焼石駅（やけいし） |
| Yakimaki Station | 八木蒔駅（やきまき） |
| Yakō Station | 矢向駅（やこう） |
| Yakuendai Station | 薬園台駅（やくえんだい） |
| Yakuin Station | 薬院駅（やくいん） |
| Yakuin-ōdōri Station | 薬院大通駅（やくいんおおどおり） |
| Yakujin Station | 厄神駅（やくじん） |
| Yakumo Station | 八雲駅（やくも） |
| Yakuri Station | 八栗駅（やくり） |
| Yakuriguchi Station | 八栗口駅（やくりぐち） |
| Yakurisanjō Station | 八栗山上駅（やくりさんじょう） |
| Yakuri-Shinmichi Station | 八栗新道駅（やくりしんみち） |
| Yakuri-tozanguchi Station | 八栗登山口駅（やくりとざんぐち） |
| Yakusa Station | 八草駅（やくさ） |
| Yakushidō Station (Akita) | 薬師堂駅 (秋田県)（やくしどう） |
| Yakushido Station (Miyagi) | 薬師堂駅 (宮城県)（やくしどう） |
| Yamabe Station | 山部駅（やまべ） |
| Yamabuki Station | 山吹駅（やまぶき） |
| Yamada Station (Gifu) | 山田駅 (岐阜県)（やまだ） |
| Yamada Station (Osaka) | 山田駅 (大阪府)（やまだ） |
| Yamada Station (Tokyo) | 山田駅 (東京都)（やまだ） |
| Yamadagawa Station | 山田川駅（やまだがわ） |
| Yamada-Kamiguchi Station | 山田上口駅（やまだかみぐち） |
| Yamadani Station | 山谷駅（やまだに） |
| Yamada-Nishimachi Station | 山田西町駅（やまだにしまち） |
| Yamadera Station | 山寺駅（やまでら） |
| Yamaga Station | 山家駅（やまが） |
| Yamagata Station | 山形駅（やまがた） |
| Yamagatajuku Station | 山方宿駅（やまがたじゅく） |
| Yamagawachi Station | 山河内駅（やまがわち） |
| Yamagishi Station | 山岸駅（やまぎし） |
| Yamaguchi Station (Aichi) | 山口駅 (愛知県)（やまぐち） |
| Yamaguchi Station (Yamaguchi) | 山口駅 (山口県)（やまぐち） |
| Yamaguchi Danchi Station | 山口団地駅（やまぐちだんち） |
| Yamaguma Station | 山隈駅（やまぐま） |
| Yamahana Jūkujō Station | 山鼻19条駅（やまはなじゅうくじょう） |
| Yamahana Kujō Station | 山鼻9条駅（やまはなくじょう） |
| Yamajō Station | 山城駅（やまじょう） |
| Yamakawa Station | 山川駅（やまかわ） |
| Yamakita Station | 山北駅（やまきた） |
| Yamakoshi Station | 山越駅（やまこし） |
| Yamamae Station | 山前駅（やままえ） |
| Yamamoto Station (Hyogo) | 山本駅 (兵庫県)（やまもと） |
| Yamamoto Station (Saga) | 山本駅 (佐賀県)（やまもと） |
| Yamana Station | 山名駅（やまな） |
| Yamanakadani Station | 山中渓駅（やまなかだに） |
| Yamanashishi Station | 山梨市駅（やまなしし） |
| Yamanishi Station | 山西駅（やまにし） |
| Yamanokuchi Station | 山之口駅（やまのくち） |
| Yamanome Station | 山ノ目駅（やまのめ） |
| Yamanota Station | 山の田駅（やまのた） |
| Yamanouchi Station (Hiroshima) | 山ノ内駅 (広島県)（やまのうち） |
| Yamanouchi Station (Kyoto) | 山ノ内駅 (京都府)（やまのうち） |
| Yamaoka Station | 山岡駅（やまおか） |
| Yamasaki Station | 山崎駅 (北海道)（やまさき） |
| Yamasato Station | 山郷駅（やまさと） |
| Yamase Station | 山瀬駅（やませ） |
| Yamashina Station | 山科駅（やましな） |
| Yamashiro-Aodani Station | 山城青谷駅（やましろあおだに） |
| Yamashiro-Taga Station | 山城多賀駅（やましろたが） |
| Yamashita Station (Hyogo) | 山下駅 (兵庫県)（やました） |
| Yamashita Station (Miyagi) | 山下駅 (宮城県)（やました） |
| Yamashita Station (Tokyo) | 山下駅 (東京都)（やました） |
| Yamate Station | 山手駅（やまて） |
| Yamato Station (Fukushima) | 山都駅（やまと） |
| Yamato Station (Ibaraki) | 大和駅 (茨城県)（やまと） |
| Yamato Station (Kanagawa) | 大和駅 (神奈川県)（やまと） |
| Yamato-Asakura Station | 大和朝倉駅（やまとあさくら） |
| Yamato-Futami Station | 大和二見駅（やまとふたみ） |
| Yamatogawa Station | 大和川駅（やまとがわ） |
| Yamato-Kamiichi Station | 大和上市駅（やまとかみいち） |
| Yamato-Koizumi Station | 大和小泉駅（やまとこいずみ） |
| Yamato-Saidaiji Station | 大和西大寺駅（やまとさいだいじ） |
| Yamato-Shinjō Station | 大和新庄駅（やまとしんじょう） |
| Yamato-Takada Station | 大和高田駅（やまとたかだ） |
| Yamato-Yagi Station | 大和八木駅（やまとやぎ） |
| Yamatsuriyama Station | 矢祭山駅（やまつりやま） |
| Yamazaki Station (Aichi) | 山崎駅 (愛知県)（やまざき） |
| Yamazaki Station (Kyoto) | 山崎駅 (京都府)（やまざき） |
| Yamoto Station | 矢本駅（やもと） |
| Yamubetsu Station | 止別駅（やむべつ） |
| Yamuramachi Station | 谷村町駅（やむらまち） |
| Yanaba Station | 簗場駅（やなば） |
| Yanaba Ski-jō Mae Station | ヤナバスキー場前駅（やなばすきーじょうまえ） |
| Yanagawa Station (Okayama) | 柳川停留場（やながわ） |
| Yanagawa Station (Fukushima) | 梁川駅 (福島県)（やながわ） |
| Yanagawa Station (Yamanashi) | 梁川駅 (山梨県)（やながわ） |
| Yanagawa-kibōnomori-kōen-mae Station | やながわ希望の森公園前駅（やながわきぼうのもりこうえんまえ） |
| Yanagi Station | 柳駅（やなぎ） |
| Yanagigaura Station | 柳ヶ浦駅（やなぎがうら） |
| Yanagihara Station (Ehime) | 柳原駅 (愛媛県)（やなぎはら） |
| Yanagihara Station (Iwate) | 柳原駅 (岩手県)（やなぎはら） |
| Yanagihara Station (Nagano) | 柳原駅 (長野県)（やなぎはら） |
| Yanagikōji Station | 柳小路駅（やなぎこうじ） |
| Yanagimoto Station | 柳本駅（やなぎもと） |
| Yanagisawa Station | 柳沢駅 (青森県)（やなぎさわ） |
| Yanagita Station | 柳田駅（やなぎた） |
| Yanai Station | 柳井駅（やない） |
| Yanaiminato Station | 柳井港駅（やないみなと） |
| Yanaizu Station (Gifu) | 柳津駅 (岐阜県)（やないづ） |
| Yanaizu Station (Miyagi) | 柳津駅 (宮城県)（やないづ） |
| Yanase Station | 梁瀬駅（やなせ） |
| Yanasegawa Station | 柳瀬川駅（やなせがわ） |
| Yanaze Station | 柳瀬駅（やなぜ） |
| Yano Station | 矢野駅（やの） |
| Yanokuchi Station | 矢野口駅（やのくち） |
| Yao Station | 八尾駅（やお） |
| Yaominami Station | 八尾南駅（やおみなみ） |
| Yaotome Station | 八乙女駅（やおとめ） |
| Yariminai Station | 鑓見内駅（やりみない） |
| Yasaka Station (Gifu) | 八坂駅 (岐阜県)（やさか） |
| Yasaka Station (Tokyo) | 八坂駅 (東京都)（やさか） |
| Yasehieizanguchi Station | 八瀬比叡山口駅（やせひえいざんぐち） |
| Yashima Station (Kagawa) | 屋島駅（やしま） |
| Yashima Station (Akita) | 矢島駅（やしま） |
| Yashio Station | 八潮駅（やしお） |
| Yashiro Station | 屋代駅（やしろ） |
| Yashirochō Station | 社町駅（やしろちょう） |
| Yashiroda Station | 矢代田駅（やしろだ） |
| Yashirokōkō-mae Station | 屋代高校前駅（やしろこうこうまえ） |
| Yashū-Hirakawa Station | 野州平川駅（やしゅうひらかわ） |
| Yashū-Ōtsuka Station | 野州大塚駅（やしゅうおおつか） |
| Yashū-Yamabe Station | 野州山辺駅（やしゅうやまべ） |
| Yasoba Station | 八十場駅（やそば） |
| Yasu Station (Kōchi) | 夜須駅（やす） |
| Yasu Station (Shiga) | 野洲駅（やす） |
| Yasuda Station (Kōchi) | 安田駅 (高知県)（やすだ） |
| Yasuda Station (Niigata) | 安田駅 (新潟県)（やすだ） |
| Yasuzuka Station | 安塚駅（やすづか） |
| Yasugi Station | 安来駅（やすぎ） |
| Yasuhigashi Station | 安東駅（やすひがし） |
| Yasukuni Station | 安国駅（やすくに） |
| Yasunoya Station | 安野屋駅（やすのや） |
| Yasuoka Station | 安岡駅（やすおか） |
| Yasutake Station | 安武駅（やすたけ） |
| Yasuura Station | 安浦駅（やすうら） |
| Yasuushi Station | 安牛駅（やすうし） |
| Yata Station | 矢田駅 (大阪府)（やた） |
| Yatagawa Station | 谷田川駅（やたがわ） |
| Yatake Station | 矢岳駅（やたけ） |
| Yatomi Station | 弥富駅（やとみ） |
| Yatsu Station (Akita) | 八津駅（やつ） |
| Yatsu Station (Chiba) | 谷津駅（やつ） |
| Yatsugi Station | 八次駅（やつぎ） |
| Yatsuka Station | 谷塚駅（やつか） |
| Yatsumi Station | 八積駅（やつみ） |
| Yatsumori Station | 八ツ森駅（やつもり） |
| Yatsushima Station | 八ツ島駅（やつしま） |
| Yawata Station | 八幡駅 (愛知県)（やわた） |
| Yawatahama Station | 八幡浜駅（やわたはま） |
| Yawatajuku Station | 八幡宿駅（やわたじゅく） |
| Yawatashinden Station | 八幡新田駅（やわたしんでん） |
| Yayoi Station | 弥生駅（やよい） |
| Yayoidai Station | 弥生台駅（やよいだい） |
| Yayoigaoka Station | 弥生が丘駅（やよいがおか） |
| Yazaike Station | 谷在家駅（やざいけ） |
| Yazukōkōmae Station | 八頭高校前駅（やずこうこうまえ） |

=== Yo ===
| Yoake Station | 夜明駅（よあけ） |
| Yobe Station | 余部駅（よべ） |
| Yobito Station | 呼人駅（よびと） |
| Yobitsugi Station | 呼続駅（よびつぎ） |
| Yobuno Station | 呼野駅（よぶの） |
| Yodo Station | 淀駅（よど） |
| Yōdo Station | 用土駅（ようど） |
| Yodoe Station | 淀江駅（よどえ） |
| Yodogawa Station | 淀川駅（よどがわ） |
| Yodoyabashi Station | 淀屋橋駅（よどやばし） |
| Yōga Station | 用賀駅（ようが） |
| Yogo Station | 余呉駅（よご） |
| Yōgo Station | 余戸駅（ようご） |
| Yoichi Station | 余市駅（よいち） |
| Yōka Station | 八鹿駅（ようか） |
| Yōkaichi Station | 八日市駅（ようかいち） |
| Yōkaichiba Station | 八日市場駅（ようかいちば） |
| Yōkan Station | 遥堪駅（ようかん） |
| Yokkaichi Station | 四日市駅（よっかいち） |
| Yokobori Station | 横堀駅（よこぼり） |
| Yokoe Station | 横江駅（よこえ） |
| Yōkoku Station | 暘谷駅（ようこく） |
| Yōkōdai Station | 洋光台駅（ようこうだい） |
| Yokogawa Station | 横川駅 (広島県)（よこがわ） |
| Yokogawa Station | 横川駅|広島電鉄横川線|横川駅（よこがわ） |
| Yokogawara Station | 横河原駅（よこがわら） |
| Yokohama Station | 横浜駅（よこはま） |
| Yokohama-Hazawa Station | 横浜羽沢駅（よこはまはざわ） |
| Yokohama-Honmoku Station | 横浜本牧駅（よこはまほんもく） |
| Yokoiso Station | 横磯駅（よこいそ） |
| Yokokawa Station | 横川駅 (群馬県)（よこかわ） |
| Yokokawame Station | 横川目駅（よこかわめ） |
| Yokokura Station (Miyagi) | 横倉駅 (宮城県)（よこくら） |
| Yokokura Station (Nagano) | 横倉駅 (長野県)（よこくら） |
| Yokoma Station | 横間駅（よこま） |
| Yokoo Station | 横尾駅（よこお） |
| Yokoshiba Station | 横芝駅（よこしば） |
| Yokosuka Station | 横須賀駅（よこすか） |
| Yokosuka-Chūō Station | 横須賀中央駅（よこすかちゅうおう） |
| Yokota Station | 横田駅（よこた） |
| Yokote Station | 横手駅（よこて） |
| Yokoya Station | 横屋駅（よこや） |
| Yokoyama Station (Hyogo) | 横山駅 (兵庫県)（よこやま） |
| Yokoyama Station (Ishikawa) | 横山駅 (石川県)（よこやま） |
| Yokoze Station | 横瀬駅（よこぜ） |
| Yokozutsumi Station | 横堤駅（よこづつみ） |
| Yomase Station | 夜間瀬駅（よませ） |
| Yomiuri-Land-mae Station | 読売ランド前駅（よみうりらんどまえ） |
| Yomogita Station | 蓬田駅（よもぎた） |
| Yonago Station | 米子駅（よなご） |
| Yonago Airport Station | 米子空港駅（よなごくうこう） |
| Yonaizawa Station | 米内沢駅（よないざわ） |
| Yonezu Station | 米津駅（よねづ） |
| Yonekawa Station | 米川駅（よねかわ） |
| Yoneyama Station | 米山駅（よねやま） |
| Yonezawa Station | 米沢駅（よねざわ） |
| Yono Station | 与野駅（よの） |
| Yonohonmachi Station | 与野本町駅（よのほんまち） |
| Yonomori Station | 夜ノ森駅（よのもり） |
| Yorihata Station | 寄畑駅（よりはた） |
| Yorii Station | 寄居駅（よりい） |
| Yoroi Station | 鎧駅（よろい） |
| Yoshibori Station | 吉堀駅（よしぼり） |
| Yosano Station | 与謝野駅（よさの） |
| Yoshida Station | 吉田駅 (新潟県)（よしだ） |
| Yoshidaguchi Station | 吉田口駅（よしだぐち） |
| Yoshizuka Station | 吉塚駅（よしづか） |
| Yoshihama Station (Aichi) | 吉浜駅 (愛知県)（よしはま） |
| Yoshihama Station (Iwate) | 吉浜駅 (岩手県)（よしはま） |
| Yoshii Station (Gunma) | 吉井駅 (群馬県)（よしい） |
| Yoshii Station (Nagasaki) | 吉井駅 (長崎県)（よしい） |
| Yoshiike-onsenmae Station | 葭池温泉前駅（よしいけおんせんまえ） |
| Yoshikawa Station (Ishikawa) | 良川駅（よしかわ） |
| Yoshikawa Station (Saitama) | 吉川駅（よしかわ） |
| Yoshikawa Station (Kochi) | よしかわ駅 |
| Yoshikawakōen Station | 葭川公園駅（よしかわこうえん） |
| Yoshikawa-Minami Station | 吉川美南駅（よしかわみなみ） |
| Yoshimatsu Station | 吉松駅（よしまつ） |
| Yoshimi Station | 吉見駅（よしみ） |
| Yoshiminosato Station | 吉見ノ里駅（よしみのさと） |
| Yoshimizu Station | 吉水駅（よしみず） |
| Yoshina Station | 吉名駅（よしな） |
| Yoshinaga Station | 吉永駅（よしなが） |
| Yoshinari Station | 吉成駅（よしなり） |
| Yoshino Station (Fukuoka) | 吉野駅 (福岡県)（よしの） |
| Yoshino Station (Nara) | 吉野駅 (奈良県)（よしの） |
| Yoshinobu Station | 吉野生駅（よしのぶ） |
| Yoshinochō Station | 吉野町駅（よしのちょう） |
| Yoshinogarikōen Station | 吉野ヶ里公園駅（よしのがりこうえん） |
| Yoshinoguchi Station | 吉野口駅（よしのぐち） |
| Yoshinohara Station | 吉野原駅（よしのはら） |
| Yoshinojingū Station | 吉野神宮駅（よしのじんぐう） |
| Yoshio Station | 吉尾駅（よしお） |
| Yoshioka-Kaitei Station | 吉岡海底駅（よしおかかいてい） |
| Yoshita Station | 吉田駅 (大阪府)（よした） |
| Yoshitomi Station (Fukuoka) | 吉富駅 (福岡県)（よしとみ） |
| Yoshitomi Station (Kyoto) | 吉富駅 (京都府)（よしとみ） |
| Yoshiura Station | 吉浦駅（よしうら） |
| Yoshiwara Station | 吉原駅（よしわら） |
| Yoshiwara-honchō Station | 吉原本町駅（よしわらほんちょう） |
| Yoshizawa Station | 吉沢駅（よしざわ） |
| Yotsubashi Station | 四ツ橋駅（よつばし） |
| Yotsugi Station | 四ツ木駅（よつぎ） |
| Yotsugoya Station | 四ツ小屋駅（よつごや） |
| Yotsukaidō Station | 四街道駅（よつかいどう） |
| Yotsukura Station | 四ツ倉駅（よつくら） |
| Yotsutsuji Station | 四辻駅（よつつじ） |
| Yotsuya Station | 四ツ谷駅（よつや） |
| Yotsuya-Sanchōme Station | 四谷三丁目駅（よつやさんちょうめ） |
| Yōrō Station | 養老駅（ようろう） |
| Yōrōkeikoku Station | 養老渓谷駅（ようろうけいこく） |
| Yōsonkōen Station | 養鱒公園駅（ようそんこうえん） |
| Yoto 3-chome Station | 陽東3丁目停留場（ようとうさんちょうめ） |
| Yowara Station | 榎原駅（よわら） |
| Yoyogi Station | 代々木駅（よよぎ） |
| Yoyogi-Hachiman Station | 代々木八幡駅（よよぎはちまん） |
| Yoyogi-Kōen Station | 代々木公園駅（よよぎこうえん） |
| Yoyogi-Uehara Station | 代々木上原駅（よよぎうえはら） |
| YRP Nobi Station | YRP野比駅（ワイアールピーのび） |

=== Yu ===
| Yū Station | 由宇駅（ゆう） |
| Yuasa Station | 湯浅駅（ゆあさ） |
| Yūbari Station | 夕張駅（ゆうばり） |
| Yūbikan Station | 有備館駅（ゆうびかん） |
| Yubiso Station | 湯檜曽駅（ゆびそ） |
| Yūchi Station | 勇知駅（ゆうち） |
| Yudakinshūko Station | ゆだ錦秋湖駅（ゆだきんしゅうこ） |
| Yudakōgen Station | ゆだ高原駅（ゆだこうげん） |
| Yudamura Station | 湯田村駅（ゆだむら） |
| Yudanaka Station | 湯田中駅（ゆだなか） |
| Yudaonsen Station | 湯田温泉駅（ゆだおんせん） |
| Yue Station | 湯江駅（ゆえ） |
| Yufuin Station | 由布院駅（ゆふいん） |
| Yūfutsu Station | 勇払駅（ゆうふつ） |
| Yugawara Station | 湯河原駅（ゆがわら） |
| Yuge Station | 弓削駅（ゆげ） |
| Yūhigaura-Kitsu-onsen Station | 夕日ヶ浦木津温泉駅（ゆうひがうらきつおんせん） |
| Yui Station | 由比駅（ゆい） |
| Yuigahama Station | 由比ヶ浜駅（ゆいがはま） |
| Yuinomori-central Station | ゆいの杜中央停留場（ゆいのもりちゅうおう） |
| Yuinomori-east Station | ゆいの杜東停留場（ゆいのもりひがし） |
| Yuinomori-west Station | ゆいの杜西停留場（ゆいのもりにし） |
| Yukaba Station | 行波駅（ゆかば） |
| Yūkarigaoka Station | ユーカリが丘駅（ゆーかりがおか） |
| Yukawa Station | 湯川駅（ゆかわ） |
| Yuki Station (Hiroshima) | 油木駅（ゆき） |
| Yuki Station (Tokushima) | 由岐駅（ゆき） |
| Yūki Station | 結城駅（ゆうき） |
| Yukigaya-Ōtsuka Station | 雪が谷大塚駅（ゆきがやおおつか） |
| Yukuhashi Station | 行橋駅（ゆくはし） |
| Yumegaoka Station | ゆめが丘駅（ゆめがおか） |
| Yumemino Station | ゆめみ野駅（ゆめみの） |
| Yumesakigawa Station | 夢前川駅（ゆめさきがわ） |
| Yumeshima Station | 夢洲駅（ゆめしま） |
| Yumigahama Station | 弓ヶ浜駅（ゆみがはま） |
| Yumoto Station | 湯本駅（ゆもと） |
| Yuni Station | 由仁駅（ゆに） |
| Yunishigawaonsen Station | 湯西川温泉駅（ゆにしがわおんせん） |
| Yuno Station | 湯野駅（ゆの） |
| Yunohira Station | 湯平駅（ゆのひら） |
| Yunohora-Onsen-guchi Station | 湯の洞温泉口駅（ゆのほらおんせんぐち） |
| Yunokamionsen Station | 湯野上温泉駅（ゆのかみおんせん） |
| Yunoki Station (Shizuoka, Shizuoka) | 柚木駅 (静岡市)（ゆのき） |
| Yunoki Station (Fuji, Shizuoka) | 柚木駅 (静岡県富士市)（ゆのき） |
| Yunomae Station | 湯前駅（ゆのまえ） |
| Yunomoto Station | 湯之元駅（ゆのもと） |
| Yunoo Station | 湯尾駅（ゆのお） |
| Yunotai Station | 湯ノ岱駅（ゆのたい） |
| Yunotō Station | 湯ノ峠駅（ゆのとう） |
| Yunotsu Station | 温泉津駅（ゆのつ） |
| Yunoura Station | 湯浦駅（ゆのうら） |
| Yunoyamaonsen Station | 湯の山温泉駅（ゆのやまおんせん） |
| Yura Station | 由良駅（ゆら） |
| Yūrakuchō Station | 有楽町駅（ゆうらくちょう） |
| Yurigahara Station | 百合が原駅（ゆりがはら） |
| Yurigaoka Station | 百合ヶ丘駅（ゆりがおか） |
| Yusato Station | 湯里駅（ゆさと） |
| Yushima Station (Iwate) | 油島駅（ゆしま） |
| Yushima Station (Tokyo) | 湯島駅（ゆしま） |
| Yusu Station | 柚須駅（ゆす） |
| Yusubaru Station | 油須原駅（ゆすばる） |
| Yutama Station | 湯玉駅（ゆたま） |
| Yūtari Station | 勇足駅（ゆうたり） |
| Yūtenji Station | 祐天寺駅（ゆうてんじ） |
| Yuyaonsen Station | 湯谷温泉駅（ゆやおんせん） |
| Yuza Station | 遊佐駅（ゆざ） |
| Yūzaki Station | 結崎駅（ゆうざき） |
| Yuzawa Station | 湯沢駅（ゆざわ） |
| Yuze-Onsen Station | 湯瀬温泉駅（ゆぜおんせん） |
