= List of railway stations in Japan: A =

List of railway stations in Japan

| A | B | C | D | E | F | G | H | I | J | KL | M | N | O | P | R | S | T | U | W | Y | Z |

This list shows the railway stations in Japan that begin with the letter A. This is a subset of the full list of railway stations in Japan.

== Station list ==
=== Ab-Ai ===
| Abashiri Station | 網走駅（あばしり） |
| Abe Station | 安部駅（あべ） |
| Abekawa Station | 安倍川駅（あべかわ） |
| Abeno Station | 阿倍野駅（あべの） |
| Abeyamakōen Station | 安部山公園駅（あべやまこうえん） |
| Abiki Station | 網引駅（あびき） |
| Abiko Station (Chiba) | 我孫子駅 (千葉県)（あびこ） |
| Abiko Station (Osaka) | 我孫子駅 (大阪府)（あびこ） |
| Abikochō Station | 我孫子町駅（あびこちょう） |
| Abikomae Station | 我孫子前駅（あびこまえ） |
| Abikomichi Station | 我孫子道駅（あびこみち） |
| Abira Station | 安平駅（あびら） |
| Aboshi Station | 網干駅（あぼし） |
| Abozaki Station | 阿母崎駅（あぼざき） |
| Abukuma Station | あぶくま駅 |
| Aburaden Station | 油田駅（あぶらでん） |
| Aburahi Station | 油日駅（あぶらひ） |
| Aburakawa Station | 油川駅（あぶらかわ） |
| Aburatsu Station | 油津駅（あぶらつ） |
| Adachi Station | 安達駅（あだち） |
| Adachi-Odai Station | 足立小台駅（あだちおだい） |
| Adogawa Station | 安曇川駅（あどがわ） |
| Afun Station | 阿分駅（あふん） |
| Afurijinja Station | 阿夫利神社駅（あふりじんじゃ） |
| Agaho Station | 英賀保駅（あがほ） |
| Agano Station | 吾野駅（あがの） |
| Agarimichi Station | 上道駅 (鳥取県)（あがりみち） |
| Agata Station | 県駅（あがた） |
| Agawa Station | 阿川駅（あがわ） |
| Age Station | 上ゲ駅（あげ） |
| Ageki Station | 阿下喜駅（あげき） |
| Agematsu Station | 上松駅（あげまつ） |
| Ageo Station | 上尾駅（あげお） |
| Agi Station | 阿木駅（あぎ） |
| Agui Station | 阿久比駅（あぐい） |
| Ahina Station | 安比奈駅（あひな） |
| Aibetsu Station | 愛別駅（あいべつ） |
| Aichidaigakumae Station | 愛知大学前駅（あいちだいがくまえ） |
| Aichikyūhaku-kinen-kōen Station | 愛・地球博記念公園駅（あい・ちきゅうはくきねんこうえん） |
| Aichi-Mito Station | 愛知御津駅（あいちみと） |
| Aidai Igakubu Minamiguchi Station | 愛大医学部南口駅（あいだいいがくぶみなみぐち） |
| Aiga Station | 相賀駅（あいが） |
| Aihara Station | 相原駅（あいはら） |
| Aikamachi Station | 秋鹿町駅（あいかまち） |
| Aikan-Umetsubo Station | 愛環梅坪駅（あいかんうめつぼ） |
| Aikawa Station (Akita) | 合川駅（あいかわ） |
| Aikawa Station (Osaka) | 相川駅（あいかわ） |
| Aikō-Ishida Station | 愛甲石田駅（あいこういしだ） |
| Aimi Station | 相見駅（あいみ） |
| Aimoto Station (Hyōgo) | 藍本駅（あいもと） |
| Aimoto Station (Toyama) | 愛本駅（あいもと） |
| Aina Station | 藍那駅（あいな） |
| Aino Station (Hyōgo) | 相野駅（あいの） |
| Aino Station (Nagasaki) | 愛野駅 (長崎県)（あいの） |
| Aino Station (Shizuoka) | 愛野駅 (静岡県)（あいの） |
| Ainoki Station | 相ノ木駅（あいのき） |
| Ainonai Station | 相内駅（あいのない） |
| Ainono Station | 相野々駅（あいのの） |
| Ainosato-kōen Station | あいの里公園駅（あいのさとこうえん） |
| Ainosato-Kyōikudai Station | あいの里教育大駅（あいのさときょいくだい） |
| Ainoura Station | 相浦駅（あいのうら） |
| Aioi Station (Gifu) | 相生駅 (岐阜県)（あいおい） |
| Aioi Station (Gunma) | 相老駅（あいおい） |
| Aioi Station (Hyōgo) | 相生駅 (兵庫県)（あいおい） |
| Aioiyama Station | 相生山駅（あいおいやま） |
| Aira Station | 姶良駅（あいら） |
| Aizan Station | 愛山駅（あいざん） |
| Aizu-Arakai Station | 会津荒海駅（あいづあらかい） |
| Aizu-Bange Station | 会津坂下駅（あいづばんげ） |
| Aizu-Gamō Station | 会津蒲生駅（あいづがもう） |
| Aizu-Hinohara Station | 会津桧原駅（あいづひのはら） |
| Aizu-Hongō Station | 会津本郷駅（あいづほんごう） |
| Aizu-Kawaguchi Station | 会津川口駅（あいづかわぐち） |
| Aizuki Station | 相月駅（あいづき） |
| Aizukōgen-Ozeguchi Station | 会津高原尾瀬口駅（あいづこうげんおぜぐち） |
| Aizu-Kosugawa Station | 会津越川駅（あいづこすがわ） |
| Aizuma Station | 逢妻駅（あいづま） |
| Aizu-Miyashita Station | 会津宮下駅（あいづみやした） |
| Aizu-Mizunuma Station | 会津水沼駅（あいづみずぬま） |
| Aizu-Nagano Station | 会津長野駅（あいづながの） |
| Aizu-Nakagawa Station | 会津中川駅（あいづなかがわ） |
| Aizu-Nishikata Station | 会津西方駅（あいづにしかた） |
| Aizu-Ōshio Station | 会津大塩駅（あいづおおしお） |
| Aizu-Sakamoto Station | 会津坂本駅（あいづさかもと） |
| Aizu-Sanson-Dōjō Station | 会津山村道場駅（あいづさんそんどうじょう） |
| Aizu-Shimogō Station | 会津下郷駅（あいづしもごう） |
| Aizu-Shiozawa Station | 会津塩沢駅（あいづしおざわ） |
| Aizu-Tajima Station | 会津田島駅（あいづたじま） |
| Aizu-Takada Station | 会津高田駅（あいづたかだ） |
| Aizu-Toyokawa Station | 会津豊川駅（あいづとよかわ） |
| Aizu-Wakamatsu Station | 会津若松駅（あいづわかまつ） |
| Aizu-Yanaizu Station | 会津柳津駅（あいづやないづ） |
| Aizu-Yokota Station | 会津横田駅（あいづよこた） |

=== Aj-Am ===
| Ajigasawa Station | 鰺ヶ沢駅（あじがさわ） |
| Ajigaura Station | 阿字ヶ浦駅（あじがうら） |
| Ajikawaguchi Station | 安治川口駅（あじかわぐち） |
| Ajiki Station | 安食駅（あじき） |
| Ajima Station | 味鋺駅（あじま） |
| Ajina Station | 阿品駅（あじな） |
| Ajinahigashi Station | 阿品東駅（あじなひがし） |
| Ajioka Station | 味岡駅（あじおか） |
| Ajiro Station | 網代駅（あじろ） |
| Ajisaka Station | 味坂駅（あじさか） |
| Ajisu Station | 阿知須駅（あじす） |
| Ajiyoshi Station (Johoku Line) | 味美駅 (東海交通事業)（あじよし） |
| Ajiyoshi Station (Meitetsu) | 味美駅 (名鉄)（あじよし） |
| Aka Station | 赤駅（あか） |
| Akabane Station | 赤羽駅（あかばね） |
| Akabanebashi Station | 赤羽橋駅（あかばねばし） |
| Akabane-Iwabuchi Station | 赤羽岩淵駅（あかばねいわぶち） |
| Akabira Station | 赤平駅（あかびら） |
| Akaboshi Station | 赤星駅（あかぼし） |
| Akabuchi Station | 赤渕駅（あかぶち） |
| Akado-shōgakkōmae Station | 赤土小学校前駅（あかどしょうがっこうまえ） |
| Akagawa Station | 赤川駅（あかがわ） |
| Akagi Station (Gunma) | 赤城駅（あかぎ） |
| Akagi Station (Nagano) | 赤木駅（あかぎ） |
| Akahori Station | 赤堀駅（あかほり） |
| Akai Station | 赤井駅（あかい） |
| Akaigawa Station | 赤井川駅（あかいがわ） |
| Akaike Station (Aichi) | 赤池駅 (愛知県)（あかいけ） |
| Akaike Station (Fukuoka) | 赤池駅 (福岡県)（あかいけ） |
| Akaike Station (Gifu) | 赤池駅 (岐阜県)（あかいけ） |
| Akaiwa Station | 赤岩駅 (福島県)（あかいわ） |
| Akaiwaguchi Station | 赤岩口駅（あかいわぐち） |
| Akaji Station | あかぢ駅 |
| Akakura-Onsen Station | 赤倉温泉駅（あかくらおんせん） |
| Akama Station | 赤間駅（あかま） |
| Akameguchi Station | 赤目口駅（あかめぐち） |
| Akamine Station | 赤嶺駅（あかみね） |
| Akamizu Station | 赤水駅（あかみず） |
| Akano Station | 赤野駅（あかの） |
| Akaoka Station | あかおか駅（あかおか） |
| Akasaka Station (Fukuoka) | 赤坂駅 (福岡県)（あかさか） |
| Akasaka Station (Gunma) | 赤坂駅 (群馬県)（あかさか） |
| Akasaka Station (Tokyo) | 赤坂駅 (東京都)（あかさか） |
| Akasaka Station (Yamanashi) | 赤坂駅 (山梨県)（あかさか） |
| Akasaka-mitsuke Station | 赤坂見附駅（あかさかみつけ） |
| Akasakata Station | 赤坂田駅（あかさかた） |
| Akasakaue Station | 赤坂上駅（あかさかうえ） |
| Akasaki Station (Iwate) | 赤崎駅（あかさき） |
| Akasaki Station (Tottori) | 赤碕駅（あかさき） |
| Akasako Station | 赤迫駅（あかさこ） |
| Akase Station | 赤瀬駅（あかせ） |
| Akashi Station | 明石駅（あかし） |
| Akashina Station | 明科駅（あかしな） |
| Akatsuka Station (Ibaraki) | 赤塚駅（あかつか） |
| Akatsuka Station (Shimane) | 明塚駅（あかつか） |
| Akatsukigakuenmae Station | 暁学園前駅（あかつきがくえんまえ） |
| Akayu Station | 赤湯駅（あかゆ） |
| Akebonobashi Station | 曙橋駅（あけぼのばし） |
| Akechi Station (Ena, Gifu) | 明智駅 (岐阜県恵那市)（あけち） |
| Akechi Station (Kani, Gifu) | 明智駅 (岐阜県可児市)（あけち） |
| Akeno Station | 明野駅（あけの） |
| Aketo Station | 明戸駅（あけと） |
| Aki Station | 安芸駅（あき） |
| Akiaga Station | 安芸阿賀駅（あきあが） |
| Akigawa Station | 秋川駅（あきがわ） |
| Aki General Hospital Station | あき総合病院前駅（あきそうごうびょういんまえ） |
| Akihabara Station | 秋葉原駅（あきはばら） |
| Aki-Kameyama Station | あき亀山駅（あきかめやま） |
| Aki-Kawajiri Station | 安芸川尻駅（あきかわじり） |
| Aki-Nagahama Station | 安芸長浜駅（あきながはま） |
| Aki-Nagatsuka Station | 安芸長束駅（あきながつか） |
| Aki-Nakano Station | 安芸中野駅（あきなかの） |
| Aki-Saizaki Station | 安芸幸崎駅（あきさいざき） |
| Akishima Station | 昭島駅（あきしま） |
| Akita Station | 秋田駅（あきた） |
| Akitakamotsu Station | 秋田貨物駅（あきたかもつ） |
| Akitakitakō Station | 秋田北港駅（あきたきたこう） |
| Akita Port Station | 秋田港駅（あきたこう） |
| Akitashirakami Station | あきた白神駅（あきたしらかみ） |
| Akitsu Station (Hiroshima) | 安芸津駅（あきつ） |
| Akitsu Station (Tokyo) | 秋津駅（あきつ） |
| Akiyaguchi Station | 安芸矢口駅（あきやぐち） |
| Akiyama Station | 秋山駅（あきやま） |
| Akkeshi Station | 厚岸駅（あっけし） |
| Akogashima Station | 安子ヶ島駅（あこがしま） |
| Akogi Station | 阿漕駅（あこぎ） |
| Akui Station | 鮎喰駅（あくい） |
| Akune Station | 阿久根駅（あくね） |
| Akuragawa Station | 阿倉川駅（あくらがわ） |
| Amaariki Station | 海士有木駅（あまありき） |
| Amagasaka Station | 尼ヶ坂駅（あまがさか） |
| Amagasaki Center Pool Mae Station | 尼崎センタープール前駅（あまがさきせんたーぷーるまえ） |
| Amagasaki Station (JR West) | 尼崎駅 (JR西日本)（あまがさき） |
| Amagasaki Station (Hanshin) | 尼崎駅 (阪神)（あまがさき） |
| Amagase Station | 天ヶ瀬駅（あまがせ） |
| Amagatsuji Station | 尼ヶ辻駅（あまがつじ） |
| Amagi Station | 甘木駅（あまぎ） |
| Amago Station | 尼子駅（あまご） |
| Amaharashi Station | 雨晴駅（あまはらし） |
| Amaji Station | 甘地駅（あまじ） |
| Amami Station | 天見駅（あまみ） |
| Amanohashidate Station | 天橋立駅（あまのはしだて） |
| Amariko Station | 余子駅（あまりこ） |
| Amarube Station | 餘部駅（あまるべ） |
| Amarume Station | 余目駅（あまるめ） |
| Amatsu Station | 天津駅（あまつ） |
| Amaya Station | あまや駅 |
| Amino Station | 網野駅（あみの） |
| Amori Station | 安茂里駅（あもり） |

=== An-Ar ===
| Anabe Station | 穴部駅（あなべ） |
| Anabuki Station | 穴吹駅（あなぶき） |
| Anagawa Station (Chiba) | 穴川駅 (千葉県)（あながわ） |
| Anagawa Station (Mie) | 穴川駅 (三重県)（あながわ） |
| Anamizu Station | 穴水駅（あなみず） |
| Anamoriinari Station | 穴守稲荷駅（あなもりいなり） |
| Anan Station | 阿南駅（あなん） |
| Ananai Station | 穴内駅（あなない） |
| Anayama Station | 穴山駅（あなやま） |
| Andō Station | 安堂駅（あんどう） |
| Anebetsu Station | 姉別駅（あねべつ） |
| Anegasaki Station | 姉ヶ崎駅（あねがさき） |
| Ani-Matagi Station | 阿仁マタギ駅（あにマタギ） |
| Aniai Station | 阿仁合駅（あにあい） |
| Anihata Station | 兄畑駅（あにはた） |
| Ani-Maeda Onsen Station | 阿仁前田温泉駅（あにまえだおんせん） |
| Anjinzuka Station | 安針塚駅(あんじんづか) |
| Anjō Station | 安城駅（あんじょう） |
| Annaka Station | 安中駅（あんなか） |
| Annakaharuna Station | 安中榛名駅（あんなかはるな） |
| Anō Station (Fukuoka) | 穴生駅（あのお） |
| Anō Station (Mie) | 穴太駅 (三重県)（あのう） |
| Anō Station (Shiga) | 穴太駅 (滋賀県)（あのお） |
| Antaroma Station | 安足間駅（あんたろま） |
| Anzen Station | 安善駅（あんぜん） |
| Ao Station | 粟生駅（あお） |
| Aoba Station | 青葉駅（あおば） |
| Aobadai Station | 青葉台駅（あおばだい） |
| Aoba-dōri Station | あおば通駅（あおばどおり） |
| Aoba-dori Ichibancho Station | 青葉通一番町駅（あおばどおりいちばんちょう） |
| Aobayama Station | 青葉山駅（あおばやま） |
| Aobe Station | 青部駅（あおべ） |
| Aohara Station | 青原駅（あおはら） |
| Aohori Station | 青堀駅（あおほり） |
| Aoi Station | 青井駅（あおい） |
| Aoidake Station | 青井岳駅（あおいだけ） |
| Aokura Station | 青倉駅（あおくら） |
| Aomi Station | 青海駅 (東京都)（あおみ） |
| Aomono-yokochō Station | 青物横丁駅（あおものよこちょう） |
| Aomori Station | 青森駅（あおもり） |
| Aonogahara Station | 青野ヶ原駅（あおのがはら） |
| Aonogō Station | 青郷駅（あおのごう） |
| Aonoyama Station | 青野山駅（あおのやま） |
| Aonuma Station | 青沼駅（あおぬま） |
| Aoshima Station | 青島駅（あおしま） |
| Aoto Station | 青砥駅（あおと） |
| Aotsuka Station | 青塚駅（あおつか） |
| Aoya Station | 青谷駅（あおや） |
| Aoyagi Station | 青柳駅（あおやぎ） |
| Aoyagichō Station | 青柳町駅（あおやぎちょう） |
| Aoyama Station (Aichi) | 青山駅 (愛知県)（あおやま） |
| Aoyama Station (Iwate) | 青山駅 (岩手県)（あおやま） |
| Aoyama Station (Niigata) | 青山駅 (新潟県)（あおやま） |
| Aoyamachō Station | 青山町駅（あおやまちょう） |
| Aoyama-itchōme Station | 青山一丁目駅（あおやまいっちょうめ） |
| Aozasa Station | 青笹駅（あおざさ） |
| Aōzu Station | 粟生津駅（あおうづ） |
| Appikōgen Station | 安比高原駅（あっぴこうげん） |
| Aputoichishiro Station | アプトいちしろ駅（あぷといちしろ） |
| Aragakashinokidai Station | 荒河かしの木台駅（あらがかしのきだい） |
| Arahama Station | 荒浜駅（あらはま） |
| Arahata Station | 荒畑駅（あらはた） |
| Arai Station (Hyogo) | 荒井駅 (兵庫県)（あらい） |
| Arai Station (Miyagi) | 荒井駅 (宮城県)（あらい） |
| Arai Station (Niigata) | 新井駅 (新潟県)（あらい） |
| Araijuku Station | 新井宿駅（あらいじゅく） |
| Araimachi Station | 新居町駅（あらいまち） |
| Araiyakushimae Station | 新井薬師前駅（あらいやくしまえ） |
| Arakawa-itchūmae Station | 荒川一中前駅（あらかわいっちゅうまえ） |
| Arakawakuyakushomae Station | 荒川区役所前駅（あらかわくやくしょまえ） |
| Arakawa-nanachōme Station | 荒川七丁目駅（あらかわななちょうめ） |
| Arakawa-nichōme Station | 荒川二丁目駅（あらかわにちょうめ） |
| Arakawaoki Station | 荒川沖駅（あらかわおき） |
| Arakawa-shakomae Station | 荒川車庫前駅（あらかわしゃこまえ） |
| Arakawa-yūenchimae Station | 荒川遊園地前駅（あらかわゆうえんちまえ） |
| Araki Station (Fukuoka) | 荒木駅（あらき） |
| Araki Station (Chiba) | 新木駅（あらき） |
| Arako Station | 荒子駅（あらこ） |
| Arakogawa-kōen Station | 荒子川公園駅（あらこがわこうえん） |
| Aramachi Station (Miyagi) | 荒町駅（あらまち） |
| Aramachi Station (Toyama) | 荒町停留場（あらまち） |
| Aramoto Station | 荒本駅（あらもと） |
| Arao Station (Gifu) | 荒尾駅 (岐阜県)（あらお） |
| Arao Station (Kumamoto) | 荒尾駅 (熊本県)（あらお） |
| Arase Station | 荒瀬駅（あらせ） |
| Arashima Station | 荒島駅（あらしま） |
| Arashiyama Station (Keifuku) | 嵐山駅 (京福電気鉄道)（あらしやま） |
| Arashiyama Station (Hankyu) | 嵐山駅 (阪急)（あらしやま） |
| Aratamabashi Station | 新瑞橋駅（あらたまばし） |
| Aratano Station | 新野駅 (徳島県)（あらたの） |
| Arato Station | 荒砥駅（あらと） |
| Araya Station (Akita) | 新屋駅 (秋田県)（あらや） |
| Araya Station (Gunma) | 新屋駅 (群馬県)（あらや） |
| Arayamae Station | 荒谷前駅（あらやまえ） |
| Araya-Shinmachi Station | 荒屋新町駅（あらやしんまち） |
| Ariake Station (Nagano) | 有明駅 (長野県)（ありあけ） |
| Ariake Station (Tokyo) | 有明駅 (東京都)（ありあけ） |
| Ariake-tennis-no-mori Station | 有明テニスの森駅（ありあけてにすのもり） |
| Ariake-Yue Station | 有明湯江駅（ありあけゆえ） |
| Arihata Station | 有畑駅（ありはた） |
| Arii Station | 有井駅（ありい） |
| Ariigawa Station | 有井川駅（ありいがわ） |
| Arikabe Station | 有壁駅（ありかべ） |
| Arimagawa Station | 有間川駅（ありまがわ） |
| Arimaguchi Station | 有馬口駅（ありまぐち） |
| Arimaonsen Station | 有馬温泉駅（ありまおんせん） |
| Arimatsu Station | 有松駅（ありまつ） |
| Arimineguchi Station | 有峰口駅（ありみねぐち） |
| Arioka Station | 有岡駅（ありおか） |
| Arisa Station | 有佐駅（ありさ） |
| Arisugawa Station | 有栖川駅（ありすがわ） |
| Arita Station | 有田駅（ありた） |
| Arito Station | 有戸駅（ありと） |
| Ariyoshi Station | 在良駅（ありよし） |

=== As ===
| Asa Station | 厚狭駅（あさ） |
| Asabu Station | 麻生駅（あさぶ） |
| Asagaya Station | 阿佐ヶ谷駅（あさがや） |
| Asagiri Station (Hyōgo) | 朝霧駅（あさぎり） |
| Asagiri Station (Kumamoto) | あさぎり駅 |
| Asagishi Station | 浅岸駅（あさぎし） |
| Asahi Station (Chiba) | 旭駅 (千葉県)（あさひ） |
| Asahi Station (Kochi) | 旭駅 (高知県)（あさひ） |
| Asahi Station (Mie) | 朝日駅（あさひ） |
| Asahi Station (Nagano) | 朝陽駅（あさひ） |
| Asahibashi Station | 旭橋駅（あさひばし） |
| Asahigaoka Station (Miyagi) | 旭ヶ丘駅 (宮城県)（あさひがおか） |
| Asahigaoka Station (Miyazaki) | 旭ヶ丘駅 (宮崎県)（あさひがおか） |
| Asahigaoka Station (Shimane) | 朝日ヶ丘駅（あさひがおか） |
| Asahigaoka Station (Toyama) | 旭ヶ丘停留場（あさひがおか） |
| Asahihama Station | 旭浜駅（あさひはま） |
| Asahikawa Station | 旭川駅（あさひかわ） |
| Asahikawayojō Station | 旭川四条駅（あさひかわよじょう） |
| Asahimae Station | 旭前駅（あさひまえ） |
| Asahino Station | 朝日野駅（あさひの） |
| Asahiōtsuka Station | 朝日大塚駅（あさひおおつか） |
| Asaji Station | 朝地駅（あさじ） |
| Asaka Station (Osaka) | 浅香駅（あさか） |
| Asaka Station (Saitama) | 朝霞駅（あさか） |
| Asakadai Station | 朝霞台駅（あさかだい） |
| Asakanagamori Station | 安積永盛駅（あさかながもり） |
| Asakawa Station | 浅川駅（あさかわ） |
| Asakayama Station | 浅香山駅（あさかやま） |
| Asakura Station (Aichi) | 朝倉駅 (愛知県)（あさくら） |
| Asakura Station (JR Shikoku) | 朝倉駅 (高知県)（あさくら） |
| Asakura Station (Tosa Electric Railway) | 朝倉停留場（あさくら） |
| Asakuraekimae Station | 朝倉駅前駅（あさくらえきまえ） |
| Asakuragaidō Station | 朝倉街道駅（あさくらがいどう） |
| Asakusa Station (Tokyo Metro, Toei, Tobu) | 浅草駅（あさくさ） |
| Asakusa Station (Tsukuba Express) | 浅草駅 (首都圏新都市鉄道)（あさくさ） |
| Asakusabashi Station | 浅草橋駅（あさくさばし） |
| Asama Station | 朝熊駅（あさま） |
| Asamushi-Onsen Station | 浅虫温泉駅（あさむしおんせん） |
| Asanai Station | 浅内駅（あさない） |
| Asanamachi Station | 朝菜町駅（あさなまち） |
| Asanami Station | 浅海駅（あさなみ） |
| Asano Station | 浅野駅（あさの） |
| Asari Station (Hokkaido) | 朝里駅（あさり） |
| Asari Station (Shimane) | 浅利駅（あさり） |
| Asashiobashi Station | 朝潮橋駅（あさしおばし） |
| Asato Station | 安里駅（あさと） |
| Aseri Station | 安栖里駅（あせり） |
| Ashibetsu Station | 芦別駅（あしべつ） |
| Ashidachi Station | 足立駅（あしだち） |
| Ashidaki Station | 足滝駅（あしだき） |
| Ashigakubo Station | 芦ヶ久保駅（あしがくぼ） |
| Ashigara Station (Kanagawa) | 足柄駅 (神奈川県)（あしがら） |
| Ashigara Station (Shizuoka) | 足柄駅 (静岡県)（あしがら） |
| Ashigase Station | 足ヶ瀬駅（あしがせ） |
| Ashigawa Station | 芦川駅 (山梨県)（あしがわ） |
| Ashihara Station | 芦原駅（あしはら） |
| Ashiharabashi Station | 芦原橋駅（あしはらばし） |
| Ashiharachō Station | 芦原町駅（あしはらちょう） |
| Ashikaga Station | 足利駅（あしかが） |
| Ashikaga Flower Park Station | あしかがフラワーパーク駅（あしかがふらわーぱーく） |
| Ashikagashi Station | 足利市駅（あしかがし） |
| Ashikajima Station | 海鹿島駅（あしかじま） |
| Ashimori Station | 足守駅（あしもり） |
| Ashino-Kōen Station | 芦野公園駅（あしのこうえん） |
| Ashinomakionsen Station | 芦ノ牧温泉駅（あしのまきおんせん） |
| Ashinomakionsenminami Station | 芦ノ牧温泉南駅（あしのまきおんせんみなみ） |
| Ashio Station | 足尾駅（あしお） |
| Ashisawa Station | 芦沢駅（あしさわ） |
| Ashiya Station (JR West) | 芦屋駅 (JR西日本)（あしや） |
| Ashiya Station (Hanshin) | 芦屋駅 (阪神)（あしや） |
| Ashiyagawa Station | 芦屋川駅（あしやがわ） |
| Aso Station (Kumamoto) | 阿蘇駅（あそ） |
| Aso Station (Mie) | 阿曽駅（あそ） |
| Aso-Shimodajō-Fureai-Onsen Station | 阿蘇下田城ふれあい温泉駅（あそしもだじょうふれあいおんせん） |
| Aso-Shirakawa Station | 阿蘇白川駅（あそしらかわ） |
| Asō Station | 吾桑駅（あそう） |
| Asōzu Station | 浅水駅（あそうず） |
| Asso Station | 朝来駅（あっそ） |
| Asuka Station | 飛鳥駅（あすか） |
| Asukayama Station | 飛鳥山駅（あすかやま） |
| Asumomae Station | アスモ前駅（あすもまえ） |
| Asunarou Yokkaichi Station | あすなろう四日市駅（あすなろうよっかいち） |
| Asuwa Station | 足羽駅（あすわ） |
| Asuwayama-Koenguchi Station | 足羽山公園口駅（あすわやまこうえんぐち） |

=== At-Az ===
| Atago Station (Chiba) | 愛宕駅 (千葉県)（あたご） |
| Atago Station (Miyagi) | 愛宕駅 (宮城県)（あたご） |
| Atagobashi Station | 愛宕橋駅（あたごばし） |
| Atami Station | 熱海駅（あたみ） |
| Atashika Station | 新鹿駅（あたしか） |
| Atawa Station | 阿田和駅（あたわ） |
| Aterazawa Station | 左沢駅（あてらざわ） |
| Ato Station | 安登駅（あと） |
| Atomic Bomb Dome Station | 原爆ドーム前駅（げんばくどーむまえ） |
| Atsu Station | 厚保駅（あつ） |
| Atsubetsu Station | 厚別駅（あつべつ） |
| Atsuga Station | 厚賀駅（あつが） |
| Atsugi Station | 厚木駅（あつぎ） |
| Atsumi Onsen Station | あつみ温泉駅（あつみおんせん） |
| Atsunai Station | 厚内駅（あつない） |
| Atsuta Station | 熱田駅（あつた） |
| Attoko Station | 厚床駅（あっとこ） |
| Awa Station | 安和駅（あわ） |
| Awa-Akaishi Station | 阿波赤石駅（あわあかいし） |
| Awa-Amatsu Station | 安房天津駅（あわあまつ） |
| Awa-Fukui Station | 阿波福井駅（あわふくい） |
| Awagasaki Station | 粟ヶ崎駅（あわがさき） |
| Awa-Handa Station | 阿波半田駅（あわはんだ） |
| Awai Station | 粟井駅（あわい） |
| Awa-Ikeda Station | 阿波池田駅（あわいけだ） |
| Awaji Station | 淡路駅（あわじ） |
| Awajichō Station | 淡路町駅（あわじちょう） |
| Awa-Kainan Station | 阿波海南駅（あわかいなん） |
| Awa-Kamo Station | 阿波加茂駅（あわかも） |
| Awa-Kamogawa Station | 安房鴨川駅（あわかもがわ） |
| Awa-Katsuyama Station | 安房勝山駅（あわかつやま） |
| Awa-Kawabata Station | 阿波川端駅（あわかわばた） |
| Awa-Kawaguchi Station | 阿波川口駅（あわかわぐち） |
| Awa-Kawashima Station | 阿波川島駅（あわかわしま） |
| Awa-Kominato Station | 安房小湊駅（あわこみなと） |
| Awakuraonsen Station | あわくら温泉駅（あわくらおんせん） |
| Awa-Nakashima Station | 阿波中島駅（あわなかしま） |
| Awano Station | 粟野駅（あわの） |
| Awa-Ōmiya Station | 阿波大宮駅（あわおおみや） |
| Awa-Ōtani Station | 阿波大谷駅（あわおおたに） |
| Awaraonsen Station | 芦原温泉駅（あわらおんせん） |
| Awara-Yunomachi Station | あわら湯のまち駅（あわらゆのまち） |
| Awa-Tachibana Station | 阿波橘駅（あわたちばな） |
| Awa-Tomida Station | 阿波富田駅（あわとみだ） |
| Awaya Station | 粟屋駅（あわや） |
| Awa-Yamakawa Station | 阿波山川駅（あわやまかわ） |
| Awaza Station | 阿波座駅（あわざ） |
| Awazu Station (Ishikawa) | 粟津駅 (石川県)（あわづ） |
| Awazu Station (Shiga) | 粟津駅 (滋賀県)（あわづ） |
| Ayabe Station | 綾部駅（あやべ） |
| Ayagawa Station | 綾川駅（あやがわ） |
| Ayameike Station | 菖蒲池駅（あやめいけ） |
| Ayame Kōen Station | あやめ公園駅（あやめこうえん） |
| Ayanochō Station | 綾ノ町駅（あやのちょう） |
| Ayaori Station | 綾織駅（あやおり） |
| Ayaragi Station | 綾羅木駅（あやらぎ） |
| Ayase Station | 綾瀬駅（あやせ） |
| Ayashi Station | 愛子駅（あやし） |
| Ayukai Station | 鮎貝駅（あゆかい） |
| Ayukawa Station | 鮎川駅（あゆかわ） |
| Azabujūban Station | 麻布十番駅（あざぶじゅうばん） |
| Azami Station | 阿左美駅（あざみ） |
| Azamino Station | あざみ野駅（あざみの） |
| Azamui Station | 浅海井駅（あざむい） |
| Azōno Station | 薊野駅（あぞうの） |
| Azuchi Station | 安土駅（あづち） |
| Azuma Station | 吾妻駅（あづま） |
| Azumada Station | 東田駅（あずまだ） |
| Azumada-Sakaue Station | 東田坂上駅（あずまださかうえ） |
| Azumi-Kutsukake Station | 安曇沓掛駅（あずみくつかけ） |
| Azumi-Oiwake Station | 安曇追分駅（あずみおいわけ） |
| Azusabashi Station | 梓橋駅（あずさばし） |
