= Furu-Takamatsu Station =

Railway station in Takamatsu, Kagawa Prefecture, Japan

Furu-Takamatsu Station 古高松駅
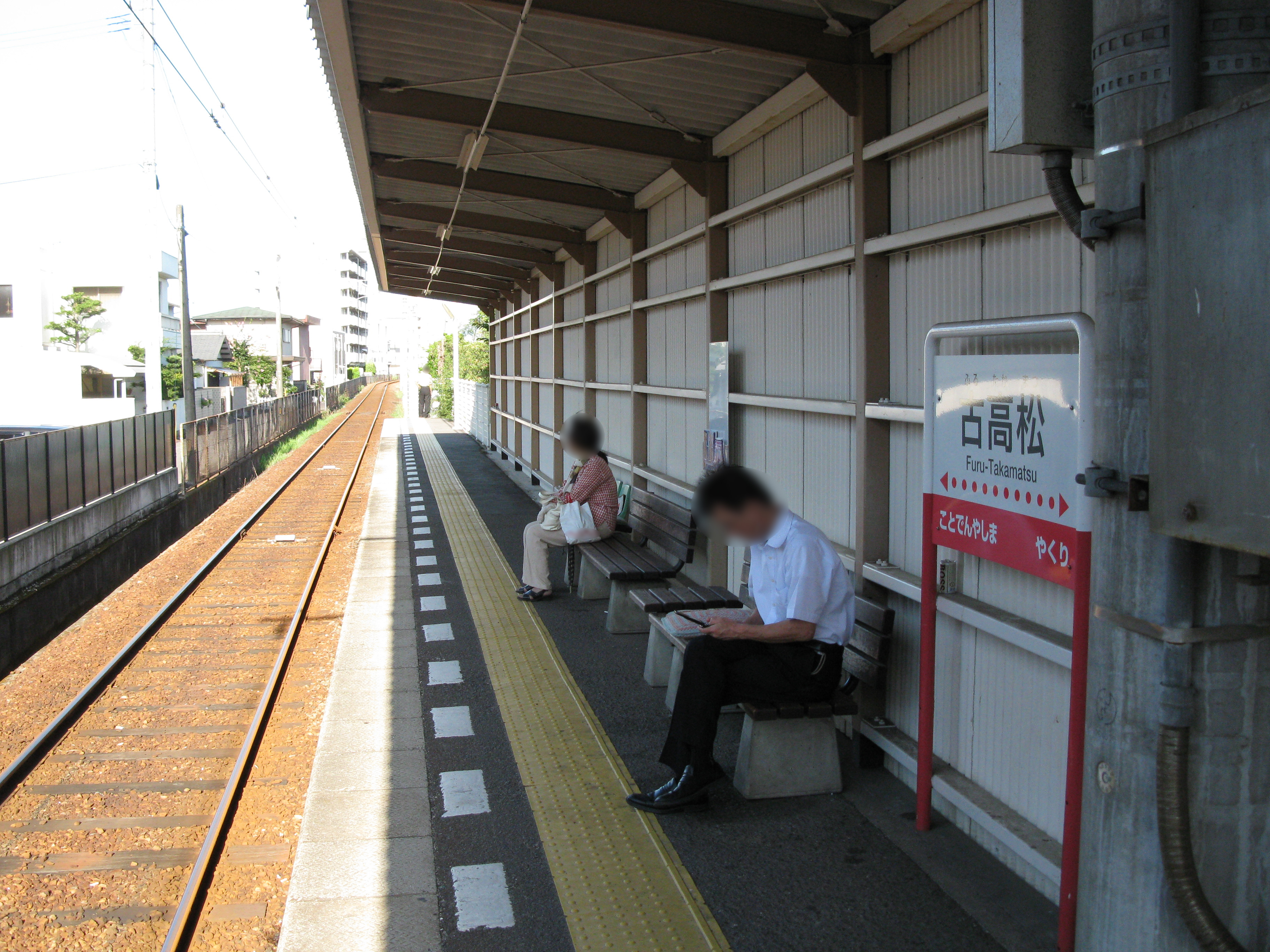
- Furu-Takamatsu Station in August 2010

General information
- Location: Takamatsucho, Takamatsu-shi, Kagawa-ken 761-0104; Japan
- Coordinates: 34°20′27″N 134°6′44.9″E
- Operator: Takamatsu-Kotohira Electric Railroad
- Line: ■ Shido Line
- Distance: 5.7 km from Kawaramachi
- Platforms: 1 side platform
- Tracks: 1

Other information
- Status: Unstaffed
- Station code: S07

History
- Opened: 18 November 1911

Passengers
- FY2018: 684 daily
Location
- Location within Kagawa Prefecture Location within Japan

Furu-Takamatsu Station (古高松駅, Furu-Takamatsu-eki) is a passenger railway station located in the city of Takamatsu, Kagawa, Japan. It is operated by the private transportation company Takamatsu-Kotohira Electric Railroad (Kotoden) and is designated station "S07".

== Lines ==
Furu-Takamatsu Station is a station of the Kotoden Shido Line and is located 5.7 km from the opposing terminus of the line at Kawaramachi Station.

== Layout ==
The station consists of one side platform serving a single bi-directional track. The station is unattended.

== Adjacent stations ==
«	Service	»
Kotoden Shido Line
Kotoden-Yashima	Local	Yakuri

== History ==
Furu-Takamatsu Station opened on November 18, 1911 on the Tosan Electric Tramway. On November 1, 1943 it became a station on the Takamatsu-Kotohira Electric Railway.

== Surrounding area ==
- JR Shikoku Yashima Station
- Japan National Route 11

== See also ==
- List of railway stations in Japan
