= List of railway stations in Japan: B =

List of railway stations in Japan

A	B	C	D	E	F	G	H	I	J	KL	M	N	O	P	R	S	T	U	W	Y	Z

This list shows the railway stations in Japan that begin with the letter B. This is a subset of the full list of railway stations in Japan.

== Station list ==
Babasakichō Station	馬場崎町駅（ばばさきちょう）
Bairin Station (Gifu)	梅林駅 (岐阜県)（ばいりん）
Bairin Station (Hiroshima)	梅林駅 (広島県)（ばいりん）
Baishinji Station	梅津寺駅（ばいしんじ）
Bakurochō Station	馬喰町駅（ばくろちょう）
Bakurōmachi Station	博労町駅（ばくろうまち）
Bakuroyokoyama Station	馬喰横山駅（ばくろよこやま）
Balloon Saga Station	バルーンさが駅
Banda Station	番田駅 (神奈川県)（ばんだ）
Bandai-Atami Station	磐梯熱海駅（ばんだいあたみ）
Bandaimachi Station	磐梯町駅（ばんだいまち）
Banden Station	番田駅 (福井県)（ばんでん）
Bandō Station	板東駅（ばんどう）
Bandōbashi Station	阪東橋駅（ばんどうばし）
Bampaku-kinen-kōen Station (Ibaraki)	万博記念公園駅 (茨城県)（ばんぱくきねんこうえん）
Bampaku-kinen-kōen Station (Osaka)	万博記念公園駅 (大阪府)（ばんぱくきねんこうえん）
Banshū-Akō Station	播州赤穂駅（ばんしゅうあこう）
Baraki Station	原木駅（ばらき）
Baraki-Nakayama Station	原木中山駅（ばらきなかやま）
Bashamichi Station	馬車道駅（ばしゃみち）
Bayside Station	ベイサイド・ステーション駅
Befu Station (Fukuoka)	別府駅 (福岡県)（べふ）
Befu Station (Hyogo)	別府駅 (兵庫県)（べふ）
Bentembashi Station	弁天橋駅（べんてんばし）
Bentenchō Station	弁天町駅（べんてんちょう）
Bentenjima Station	弁天島駅（べんてんじま）
Beppo Station	別保駅（べっぽ）
Beppu Station	別府駅 (大分県)（べっぷ）
Beppu Daigaku Station	別府大学駅（べっぷだいがく）
Bell-mae Station	ベル前駅（べるまえ）
Bessho Station (Hyogo)	別所駅 (兵庫県)（べっしょ）
Bessho-Onsen Station	別所温泉駅（べっしょおんせん）
Bettoga Station	別当賀駅（べっとが）
Bibai Station	美唄駅（びばい）
Bibaushi Station	美馬牛駅（びばうし）
Bibi Station	美々駅（びび）
Bitchū-Hirose Station	備中広瀬駅（びっちゅうひろせ）
Bitchū-Kawamo Station	備中川面駅（びっちゅうかわも）
Bitchū-Kōjiro Station	備中神代駅（びっちゅうこうじろ）
Bitchū-Kurese Station	備中呉妹駅（びっちゅうくれせ）
Bitchū-Mishima Station	備中箕島駅（びっちゅうみしま）
Bitchū-Takahashi Station	備中高梁駅（びっちゅうたかはし）
Bitchū-Takamatsu Station	備中高松駅（びっちゅうたかまつ）
Biei Station	美瑛駅（びえい）
Bifuka Station	美深駅（びふか）
Bihoro Station	美幌駅（びほろ）
Bijutsukantoshokanmae Station	美術館図書館前駅（びじゅつかんとしょかんまえ）
Bingo-Akasaka Station	備後赤坂駅（びんごあかさか）
Bingo-Honjō Station	備後本庄駅（びんごほんじょう）
Bingo-Mikawa Station	備後三川駅（びんごみかわ）
Bingo-Mikkaichi Station	備後三日市駅（びんごみっかいち）
Bingo-Ochiai Station	備後落合駅（びんごおちあい）
Bingo-Saijō Station	備後西城駅（びんごさいじょう）
Bingo-Shōbara Station	備後庄原駅（びんごしょうばら）
Bingo-Yano Station	備後矢野駅（びんごやの）
Bingo-Yasuda Station	備後安田駅（びんごやすだ）
Bingo-Yawata Station	備後八幡駅（びんごやわた）
Biruwa Station	美留和駅（びるわ）
Bishamon Station	毘沙門駅（びしゃもん）
Bishamondai Station	毘沙門台駅（びしゃもんだい）
Bishōen Station	美章園駅（びしょうえん）
Biwajima Station	枇杷島駅（びわじま）
Biwako-hamaotsu Station	びわ湖浜大津駅（びわこはまおおつ）
Bizen-Ichinomiya Station	備前一宮駅（びぜんいちのみや）
Bizen-Fukukawa Station	備前福河駅（びぜんふくかわ）
Bizen-Hara Station	備前原駅（びぜんはら）
Bizen-Katakami Station	備前片上駅（びぜんかたかみ）
Bizen-Kataoka Station	備前片岡駅（びぜんかたおか）
Bizen-Mikado Station	備前三門駅（びぜんみかど）
Bizen-Nishiichi Station	備前西市駅（びぜんにしいち）
Bizen-Tai Station	備前田井駅（びぜんたい）
Bokoi Station	母恋駅（ぼこい）
Bōeki Center Station	貿易センター駅（ぼうえきセンター）
Bōjō Station	坊城駅（ぼうじょう）
Bubaigawara Station	分倍河原駅（ぶばいがわら）
Bungo-Kiyokawa Station	豊後清川駅（ぶんごきよかわ）
Bungo-Kokubu Station	豊後国分駅（ぶんごこくぶ）
Bungo-Miyoshi Station	豊後三芳駅（ぶんごみよし）
Bungo-Mori Station	豊後森駅（ぶんごもり）
Bungo-Nakagawa Station	豊後中川駅（ぶんごなかがわ）
Bungo-Nakamura Station	豊後中村駅（ぶんごなかむら）
Bungo-Ogi Station	豊後荻駅（ぶんごおぎ）
Bungo-Taketa Station	豊後竹田駅（ぶんごたけた）
Bungo-Toyooka Station	豊後豊岡駅（ぶんごとよおか）
Bunkanomori Station	文化の森駅（ぶんかのもり）
Bunsui Station	分水駅（ぶんすい）
Bus Center Mae Station	バスセンター前駅（バスセンターまえ）
Bushi Station	仏子駅（ぶし）
Bushū-Araki Station	武州荒木駅（ぶしゅうあらき）
Bushū-Hino Station	武州日野駅（ぶしゅうひの）
Bushū-Karasawa Station	武州唐沢駅（ぶしゅうからさわ）
Bushū-Nagase Station	武州長瀬駅（ぶしゅうながせ）
Bushū-Nakagawa Station	武州中川駅（ぶしゅうなかがわ）
Busshōzan Station	仏生山駅（ぶっしょうざん）
Buzen-Ōkuma Station	豊前大熊駅（ぶぜんおおくま）
Buzen-Kawasaki Station	豊前川崎駅（ぶぜんかわさき）
Buzen-Masuda Station	豊前桝田駅（ぶぜんますだ）
Buzen-Nagasu Station	豊前長洲駅（ぶぜんながす）
Buzen-Shōe Station	豊前松江駅（ぶぜんしょうえ）
Buzen-Zenkōji Station	豊前善光寺駅（ぶぜんぜんこうじ）
Byōbugaura Station	屏風浦駅（びょうぶがうら）
