= List of railway stations in Japan: D =

List of railway stations in Japan

A	B	C	D	E	F	G	H	I	J	KL	M	N	O	P	R	S	T	U	W	Y	Z

This list shows the railway stations in Japan that begin with the letter D. This is a subset of the full list of railway stations in Japan.

== Station list ==
Daian Station	大安駅 (三重県)（だいあん）
Daianji Station	大安寺駅（だいあんじ）
Daiba Station (Shizuoka)	大場駅（だいば）
Daiba Station (Tokyo)	台場駅（だいば）
Daidō Station	大道駅（だいどう）
Daidōchō Station	大同町駅（だいどうちょう）
Daidō-Toyosato Station	だいどう豊里駅（だいどうとよさと）
Daifuku Station	大福駅（だいふく）
Daigaku Station	大学駅（だいがく）
Daigakumae Station (Nagano)	大学前駅 (長野県)（だいがくまえ）
Daigakumae Station (Shiga)	大学前駅 (滋賀県)（だいがくまえ）
Daigo Station (Akita)	醍醐駅 (秋田県)（だいご）
Daigo Station (Kyoto)	醍醐駅 (京都府)（だいご）
Daigyōji Station	大行司駅（だいぎょうじ）
Daihō Station	大宝駅（だいほう）
Daiichidōri Station	第一通り駅（だいいちどおり）
Daijingūshita Station	大神宮下駅（だいじんぐうした）
Daikai Station	大開駅（だいかい）
Daikanchō Station	代官町駅（だいかんちょう）
Daikan-yama Station	代官山駅（だいかんやま）
Daikokuchō Station	大国町駅（だいこくちょう）
Daimon Station (Aichi)	大門駅 (愛知県)（だいもん）
Daimon Station (Hiroshima)	大門駅 (広島県)（だいもん）
Daimon Station (Tokyo)	大門駅 (東京都)（だいもん）
Daimotsu Station	大物駅（だいもつ）
Dainichi Station	大日駅（だいにち）
Dainohara Station	台原駅（だいのはら）
Dainyū Station	大入駅（だいにゅう）
Daisenguchi Station	大山口駅（だいせんぐち）
Daisenji Station	大川寺駅（だいせんじ）
Daishaka Station	大釈迦駅（だいしゃか）
Daishibashi Station	大師橋駅（だいしばし）
Daishimae Station	大師前駅（だいしまえ）
Daishōji Station	大聖寺駅（だいしょうじ）
Daitabashi Station	代田橋駅（だいたばし）
Daitembōdai Station	大展望台駅（だいてんぼうだい）
Daitō Station	大塔駅（だいとう）
Daiyamukō Station	大谷向駅（だいやむこう）
Daiyūzan Station	大雄山駅（だいゆうざん）
Daizenji Station	大善寺駅（だいぜんじ）
Dan Station	段駅（だん）
Dashina Station	駄科駅（だしな）
Date Station	伊達駅（だて）
Date-Mombetsu Station	伊達紋別駅（だてもんべつ）
Dazaifu Station	太宰府駅（だざいふ）
Dekijima Station	出来島駅（できじま）
Demachiyanagi Station	出町柳駅（でまちやなぎ）
Dempō Station	伝法駅（でんぽう）
Den-en-chōfu Station	田園調布駅（でんえんちょうふ）
Dentetsu Ishida Station	電鉄石田駅（でんてついしだ）
Dentetsu Izumoshi Station	電鉄出雲市駅（でんてついずもし）
Dentetsu Kurobe Station	電鉄黒部駅（でんてつくろべ）
Dentetsutāminarubiru-mae Station	電鉄ターミナルビル前駅（でんてつたーみなるびるまえ）
Dentetsu Toyama Station	電鉄富山駅（でんてつとやま）
Dentetsu Uozu Station	電鉄魚津駅（でんてつうおづ）
Deto Station	出戸駅（でと）
Detohama Station	出戸浜駅（でとはま）
Deyashiki Station	出屋敷駅（でやしき）
Doai Station	土合駅（どあい）
Dobashi Station (Ehime)	土橋駅 (愛媛県)（どばし）
Dobashi Station (Hiroshima)	土橋停留場（どばし）
Dobukai Station	土深井駅（どぶかい）
Dōbutsuen Station	動物園駅 (愛知県犬山市)（どうぶつえん）
Dōbutsuen-mae Station	動物園前駅（どうぶつえんまえ）
Dōbutsukōen Station	動物公園駅（どうぶつこうえん）
Dōgokōen Station	道後公園駅（どうごこうえん）
Dōgo-Onsen Station	道後温泉駅（どうごおんせん）
Dogoyama Station	道後山駅（どうごやま）
Dōhōji Station	道法寺駅（どうほうじ）
Doi Station (Fukuoka)	土井駅（どい）
Doi Station (Osaka)	土居駅（どい）
Doichi Station	土市駅（どいち）
Doida Station	土居田駅（どいだ）
Dōjima Station	堂島駅（どうじま）
Dōjō Station	道場駅（どうじょう）
Dōjōji Station	道成寺駅（どうじょうじ）
Dōjō-minamiguchi Station	道場南口駅（どうじょうみなみぐち）
Dokkyodaigakumae Station	獨協大学前駅（どっきょうだいがくまえ）
Domeki Station	轟駅（どめき）
Dome-mae Station	ドーム前駅（どーむまえ）
Dome-mae Chiyozaki Station	ドーム前千代崎駅（どーむまえちよざき）
Domoto Station	土本駅（どもと）
Dōmyōji Station	道明寺駅（どうみょうじ）
Dōsen Station	洞泉駅（どうせん）
Dōshishamae Station	同志社前駅（どうししゃまえ）
Dōshokubutsuen-iriguchi Station	動植物園入口停留場（どうしょくぶつえんいりぐち）
Dosokohama Station	土底浜駅（どそこはま）
Dōtoku Station	道徳駅（どうとく）
