= List of railway stations in Japan: Z =

List of railway stations in Japan

A	B	C	D	E	F	G	H	I	J	KL	M	N	O	P	R	S	T	U	W	Y	Z

This list shows the railway stations in Japan that begin with the letter Z. This is a subset of the full list of railway stations in Japan.

== Station list ==
Zaikōji Station	財光寺駅（ざいこうじ）
Zama Station	座間駅（ざま）
Zaō Station	蔵王駅（ざおう）
Zasshonokuma Station	雑餉隈駅（ざっしょのくま）
Zen Station	膳駅（ぜん）
Zendōji Station	善導寺駅（ぜんどうじ）
Zengo Station	前後駅（ぜんご）
Zengyō Station	善行駅（ぜんぎょう）
Zenibako Station	銭函駅（ぜにばこ）
Zenjino Station	善師野駅（ぜんじの）
Zenkōji Station	善光寺駅（ぜんこうじ）
Zenkōjishita Station	善光寺下駅（ぜんこうじした）
Zenshōji Station	禅昌寺駅（ぜんしょうじ）
Zentsūji Station	善通寺駅（ぜんつうじ）
Zeze Station	膳所駅（ぜぜ）
Zezehonmachi Station	膳所本町駅（ぜぜほんまち）
Zōda Station	造田駅（ぞうだ）
Zōshigaya Station	雑司が谷駅（ぞうしがや）
Zōshiki Station	雑色駅（ぞうしき）
Zōshuku Station	蔵宿駅（ぞうしゅく）
Zuiko Yonchome Station	瑞光四丁目駅（ずいこうよんちょうめ）
Zushi Station	逗子駅（ずし）
Zushi·Hayama Station	逗子・葉山駅（ずしはやま）
