= List of railway stations in Japan: C =

List of railway stations in Japan

A	B	C	D	E	F	G	H	I	J	KL	M	N	O	P	R	S	T	U	W	Y	Z

This list shows the railway stations in Japan that begin with the letter C. This is a subset of the full list of railway stations in Japan.

== Station list ==
Cable Enryakuji Station	ケーブル延暦寺駅（けーぶるえんりゃくじ）
Cable-hachimangū-guchi Station	ケーブル八幡宮口駅（けーぶるはちまんぐうぐち）
Cable-hachimangū-sanjō Station	ケーブル八幡宮山上駅（けーぶるはちまんぐうさんじょう）
Cable Hiei Station	ケーブル比叡駅（けーぶるひえい）
Cable Sakamoto Station	ケーブル坂本駅（けーぶるさかもと）
Cable Sanjō Station	ケーブル山上駅（けーぶるさんじょう）
Cable Yase Station	ケーブル八瀬駅（けーぶるやせ）
Center Kita Station	センター北駅（せんたーきた）
Center Minami Station	センター南駅（せんたーみなみ）
Central Japan International Airport Station	中部国際空港駅（ちゅうぶこくさいくうこう）
Chajo Station	茶所駅（ちゃじょ）
Chanai Station	茶内駅（ちゃない）
Chashinai Station	茶志内駅（ちゃしない）
Chausuyama Station	茶臼山駅（ちゃうすやま）
Chayagasaka Station	茶屋ヶ坂駅（ちゃやがさか）
Chayama Station	茶山駅 (福岡県)（ちゃやま）
Chayama·Kyōto-Geijutsudaigaku Station	茶山・京都芸術大学駅（ちゃやまきょうとげいじゅつだいがく）
Chayamachi Station	茶屋町駅（ちゃやまち）
Chiba New Town Chūō Station	千葉ニュータウン中央駅（ちばニュータウンちゅうおう）
Chiba Station	千葉駅（ちば）
Chiba-Chūō Station	千葉中央駅（ちばちゅうおう）
Chibadera Station	千葉寺駅（ちばでら）
Chibakōen Station	千葉公園駅（ちばこうえん）
Chibaminato Station	千葉みなと駅（ちばみなと）
Chibata Station	知波田駅（ちばた）
Chibiki Station	千曳駅（ちびき）
Chibune Station	千船駅（ちぶね）
Chichibu Station	秩父駅（ちちぶ）
Chidori Station	千鳥駅（ちどり）
Chidoribashi Station	千鳥橋駅（ちどりばし）
Chidorichō Station	千鳥町駅 (東京都)（ちどりちょう）
Chiebun Station	智恵文駅（ちえぶん）
Chigane Station	千金駅（ちがね）
Chigaki Station	千垣駅（ちがき）
Chigasaki Station	茅ヶ崎駅（ちがさき）
Chigozuka Station	稚子塚駅（ちごづか）
Chiharadai Station	ちはら台駅（ちはらだい）
Chihaya Station	千早駅（ちはや）
Chihayaguchi Station	千早口駅（ちはやぐち）
Chihoku Station	智北駅（ちほく）
Chiji Station	千路駅（ちじ）
Chikabumi Station	近文駅（ちかぶみ）
Chikagawa Station	近川駅（ちかがわ）
Chikanaga Station	近永駅（ちかなが）
Chikata Station	近田駅（ちかた）
Chikatetsu-Akatsuka Station	地下鉄赤塚駅（ちかてつあかつか）
Chikatetsu-Narimasu Station	地下鉄成増駅（ちかてつなります）
Chikatsu Station	近津駅（ちかつ）
Chikkōchō Station	築港町駅（ちっこうちょう）
Chiku Center Station	地区センター駅（ちくセンター）
Chikugo-Funagoya Station	筑後船小屋駅（ちくごふなごや）
Chikugo-Kusano Station	筑後草野駅（ちくごくさの）
Chikugo-Ōishi Station	筑後大石駅（ちくごおおいし）
Chikugo-Yoshii Station	筑後吉井駅（ちくごよしい）
Chikuhō-Katsuki Station	筑豊香月駅（ちくほうかつき）
Chikuhō-Nakama Station	筑豊中間駅（ちくほうなかま）
Chikuhō-Nōgata Station	筑豊直方駅（ちくほうのおがた）
Chikuma Station	千曲駅（ちくま）
Chikuni Station	千国駅（ちくに）
Chikura Station	千倉駅（ちくら）
Chikusa Station	千種駅（ちくさ）
Chikushi Station	筑紫駅（ちくし）
Chikuzen-Iwaya Station	筑前岩屋駅（ちくぜんいわや）
Chikuzen-Daibu Station	筑前大分駅（ちくぜんだいぶ）
Chikuzen-Fukae Station	筑前深江駅（ちくぜんふかえ）
Chikuzen-Habu Station	筑前垣生駅（ちくぜんはぶ）
Chikuzen-Maebaru Station	筑前前原駅（ちくぜんまえばる）
Chikuzen-Shōnai Station	筑前庄内駅（ちくぜんしょうない）
Chikuzen-Uchino Station	筑前内野駅（ちくぜんうちの）
Chikuzen-Ueki Station	筑前植木駅（ちくぜんうえき）
Chikuzen-Yamae Station	筑前山家駅（ちくぜんやまえ）
Chikuzen-Yamate Station	筑前山手駅（ちくぜんやまて）
Chino Station	茅野駅（ちの）
Chippubetsu Station	秩父別駅（ちっぷべつ）
Chiraiotsu Station	知来乙駅（ちらいおつ）
Chiryū Station	知立駅（ちりゅう）
Chisato Station (Mie)	千里駅 (三重県)（ちさと）
Chisato Station (Toyama)	千里駅 (富山県)（ちさと）
Chishirodai Station	千城台駅（ちしろだい）
Chishirodai-Kita Station	千城台北駅（ちしろだいきた）
Chita-Handa Station	知多半田駅（ちたはんだ）
Chita-Okuda Station	知多奥田駅（ちたおくだ）
Chita-Taketoyo Station	知多武豊駅（ちたたけとよ）
Chitetsubirumae Station	地鉄ビル前駅（ちてつびるまえ）
Chitose Station (Aomori)	千年駅（ちとせ）
Chitose Station (Chiba)	千歳駅 (千葉県)（ちとせ）
Chitose Station (Hokkaido)	千歳駅 (北海道)（ちとせ）
Chitose-Funabashi Station	千歳船橋駅（ちとせふなばし）
Chitose-Karasuyama Station	千歳烏山駅（ちとせからすやま）
Chitō Station	智東駅（ちとう）
Chiwa Station	知和駅（ちわ）
Chiwata Station	千綿駅（ちわた）
Chiyo Station	千代駅（ちよ）
Chiyoda Station	千代田駅（ちよだ）
Chiyogaoka Station	千代ヶ岡駅（ちよがおか）
Chiyokawa Station	千代川駅（ちよかわ）
Chiyo-Kenchōguchi Station	千代県庁口駅（ちよけんちょうぐち）
Chiyozaki Station	千代崎駅（ちよざき）
Chizu Station	智頭駅（ちず）
Chōfu Station (Tokyo)	調布駅（ちょうふ）
Chōfu Station (Yamaguchi)	長府駅（ちょうふ）
Chōgo Station	長後駅（ちょうご）
Chōjabaru Station	長者原駅（ちょうじゃばる）
Chōjagahama Shiosai Hamanasu Kōenmae Station	長者ヶ浜潮騒はまなす公園前駅（ちょうじゃがはましおさいはまなすこうえんまえ）
Chōjamachi Station	長者町駅（ちょうじゃまち）
Chōkokunomori Station	彫刻の森駅（ちょうこくのもり）
Chokubetsu Station	直別駅（ちょくべつ）
Chokushi Station	勅旨駅（ちょくし）
Chōmonkyō Station	長門峡駅（ちょうもんきょう）
Chōrakuji Station	長楽寺駅（ちょうらくじ）
Chōsa Station	帖佐駅（ちょうさ）
Chōshi Station	銚子駅（ちょうし）
Chōshiguchi Station	銚子口駅（ちょうしぐち）
Chōyō Station	長陽駅（ちょうよう）
Chūbu-Tenryū Station	中部天竜駅（ちゅうぶてんりゅう）
Chūden Station	中田駅 (徳島県)（ちゅうでん）
Chūgakkō Station	中学校駅（ちゅうがっこう）
Chūgoku-Katsuyama Station	中国勝山駅（ちゅうごくかつやま）
Chūgun Station	中郡駅（ちゅうぐん）
Chūkyōkeibajōmae Station	中京競馬場前駅（ちゅうきょうけいばじょうまえ）
Chūōdaigaku Meiseidaigaku Station	中央大学・明星大学駅
Chūō-Hirosaki Station	中央弘前駅（ちゅうおうひろさき）
Chūōichibamae Station	中央市場前駅（ちゅうおういちばまえ）
Chūō-Maebashi Station	中央前橋駅（ちゅうおうまえばし）
Chūō-Rinkan Station	中央林間駅（ちゅうおうりんかん）
Chūshojima Station	中書島駅（ちゅうしょじま）
Cosmosquare Station	コスモスクエア駅（コスモスクエア）
