= List of railway stations in Japan: R =

List of railway stations in Japan

A	B	C	D	E	F	G	H	I	J	KL	M	N	O	P	R	S	T	U	W	Y	Z

This list shows the railway stations in Japan that begin with the letter R. This is a subset of the full list of railway stations in Japan.

== Station list ==
Raihai Station	礼拝駅（らいはい）
Raikōji Station	来迎寺駅（らいこうじ）
Rakurakuen Station	楽々園駅（らくらくえん）
Rakusaiguchi Station	洛西口駅（らくさいぐち）
Rakutenchishita Station	ラクテンチ下駅（らくてんちした）
Rakutenchiue Station	ラクテンチ上駅（らくてんちうえ）
Randen-Saga Station	嵐電嵯峨駅（らんでんさが）
Randen-Tenjingawa Station	嵐電天神川駅（らんでんてんじんがわ）
Rankoshi Station	蘭越駅（らんこし）
Ranru Station	蘭留駅（らんる）
Ranshima Station	蘭島駅（らんしま）
Rebun Station	礼文駅（れぶん）
Reikyūkōen Taiikukan Station	霊丘公園体育館駅（れいきゅうこうえんたいいくかん）
Reiwa Costa Yukuhashi Station	令和コスタ行橋駅（れいわこすたゆくはし）
Rembo Station	連坊駅（れんぼう）
Rendaiji Station	蓮台寺駅（れんだいじ）
Rengeji Station	蓮花寺駅（れんげじ）
Resort Gateway Station	リゾートゲートウェイ・ステーション駅
Reuke Station	礼受駅（れうけ）
Rifu Station	利府駅（りふ）
Rikuchū-Kanzaki Station	陸中門崎駅（りくちゅうかんざき）
Rikuchū-Kawai Station	陸中川井駅（りくちゅうかわい）
Rikuchū-Matsukawa Station	陸中松川駅（りくちゅうまつかわ）
Rikuchū-Nakano Station	陸中中野駅（りくちゅうなかの）
Rikuchū-Natsui Station	陸中夏井駅（りくちゅうなつい）
Rikuchū-Noda Station	陸中野田駅（りくちゅうのだ）
Rikuchū-Ōhashi Station	陸中大橋駅（りくちゅうおおはし）
Rikuchū-Ōsato Station	陸中大里駅（りくちゅうおおさと）
Rikuchū-Orii Station	陸中折居駅（りくちゅうおりい）
Rikuchū-Ube Station	陸中宇部駅（りくちゅううべ）
Rikuchū-Yagi Station	陸中八木駅（りくちゅうやぎ）
Rikuchū-Yamada Station	陸中山田駅（りくちゅうやまだ）
Rikuzen-Akai Station	陸前赤井駅（りくぜんあかい）
Rikuzen-Akasaki Station	陸前赤崎駅（りくぜんあかさき）
Rikuzen-Hamada Station	陸前浜田駅（りくぜんはまだ）
Rikuzen-Haranomachi Station	陸前原ノ町駅（りくぜんはらのまち）
Rikuzen-Hashikami Station	陸前階上駅（りくぜんはしかみ）
Rikuzen-Inai Station	陸前稲井駅（りくぜんいない）
Rikuzen-Koizumi Station	陸前小泉駅（りくぜんこいずみ）
Rikuzen-Minato Station	陸前港駅（りくぜんみなと）
Rikuzen-Ochiai Station	陸前落合駅（りくぜんおちあい）
Rikuzen-Ono Station	陸前小野駅（りくぜんおの）
Rikuzen-Ōtsuka Station	陸前大塚駅（りくぜんおおつか）
Rikuzen-Sannō Station	陸前山王駅（りくぜんさんのう）
Rikuzen-Shirasawa Station	陸前白沢駅（りくぜんしらさわ）
Rikuzen-Takasago Station	陸前高砂駅（りくぜんたかさご）
Rikuzen-Takata Station	陸前高田駅（りくぜんたかた）
Rikuzen-Togura Station	陸前戸倉駅（りくぜんとぐら）
Rikuzen-Tomiyama Station	陸前富山駅（りくぜんとみやま）
Rikuzen-Toyosato Station	陸前豊里駅（りくぜんとよさと）
Rikuzen-Yachi Station	陸前谷地駅（りくぜんやち）
Rikuzen-Yahagi Station	陸前矢作駅（りくぜんやはぎ）
Rikuzen-Yamashita Station	陸前山下駅（りくぜんやました）
Rikuzen-Yokoyama Station	陸前横山駅（りくぜんよこやま）
Ringō Station	梨郷駅（りんごう）
Rinkanden'entoshi Station	林間田園都市駅（りんかんでんえんとし）
Rinkū Town Station	りんくうタウン駅
Rinkū-Tokoname Station	りんくう常滑駅（りんくうとこなめ）
Ritsurin Station	栗林駅（りつりん）
Ritsurinkōen Station	栗林公園駅（りつりんこうえん）
Ritsurinkōen Kitaguchi Station	栗林公園北口駅（りつりんこうえんきたぐち）
Rittō Station	栗東駅（りっとう）
Rokakōen Station	芦花公園駅（ろかこうえん）
Rokken Station (Gifu)	六軒駅 (岐阜県)（ろっけん）
Rokken Station (Mie)	六軒駅 (三重県)（ろっけん）
Rokkō Cable-shita Station	六甲ケーブル下駅（ろっこうけーぶるした）
Rokkō Station	六甲駅（ろっこう）
Rokkōmichi Station	六甲道駅（ろっこうみち）
Rokkōsanjō Station	六甲山上駅（ろっこうさんじょう）
Rokubanchō Station	六番町駅（ろくばんちょう）
Rokuchō Station	六町駅（ろくちょう）
Rokuchonome Station	六丁の目駅（ろくちょうのめ）
Rokugō Station	六合駅（ろくごう）
Rokugōdote Station	六郷土手駅（ろくごうどて）
Rokuhara Station	六原駅（ろくはら）
Rokujizō Station (Keihan)	六地蔵駅 (京阪)（ろくじぞう）
Rokujizō Station (JR West)	六地蔵駅 (JR西日本・京都市営地下鉄)（ろくじぞう）
Rokujō Station	六条駅（ろくじょう）
Rokumanji Station	六万寺駅（ろくまんじ）
Rokuōin Station	鹿王院駅（ろくおういん）
Rokutanji Station	六反地駅（ろくたんじ）
Rokuwa Station	六輪駅（ろくわ）
Ropeway Iriguchi Station	ロープウェイ入口駅（ろーぷうぇいいりぐち）
Roppongi Station	六本木駅（ろっぽんぎ）
Roppongi-itchōme Station	六本木一丁目駅（ろっぽんぎいっちょうめ）
Ropponmatsu Station	六本松駅（ろっぽんまつ）
Royce' Town Station	ロイズタウン駅（ろいずたうん）
Rubeshibe Station	留辺蘂駅（るべしべ）
Rumoi Station	留萌駅（るもい）
Ryōanji Station	龍安寺駅（りょうあんじ）
Ryōgoku Station	両国駅（りょうごく）
Ryōishi Station	両石駅（りょういし）
Ryokuchikōen Station	緑地公園駅（りょくちこうえん）
Ryokuentoshi Station	緑園都市駅（りょくえんとし）
Ryōri Station	綾里駅（りょうり）
Ryūgamizu Station	竜ヶ水駅（りゅうがみず）
Ryūgasaki Station	竜ヶ崎駅（りゅうがさき）
Ryūgasakishi Station	龍ケ崎市駅（りゅうがさきし）
Ryūkokudai-mae-fukakusa Station	龍谷大前深草駅（りゅうこくだいまえふかくさ）
Ryūmai Station	竜舞駅（りゅうまい）
Ryūō Station	竜王駅（りゅうおう）
Ryūōkyō Station	龍王峡駅（りゅうおうきょう）
Ryūtsū Center Station	流通センター駅（りゅうつうせんたー）
