= Enkobashi-cho Station =

Former railway station in Hiroshima, Japan

Coordinates: 34.3953°N 132.4758°E

Enkobashi-cho Station 猿猴橋町
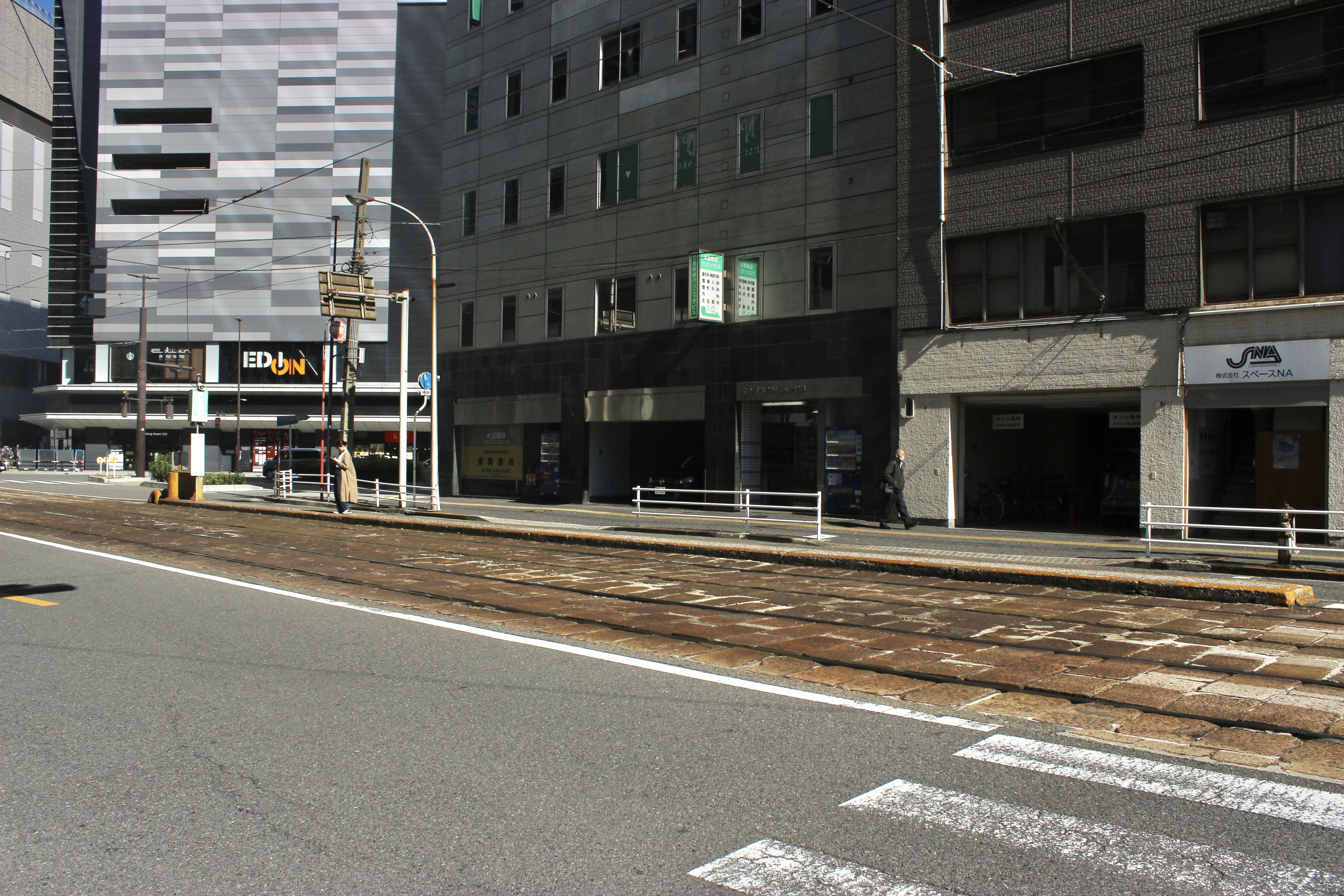

General information
- Location: Enkobashi-cho, Minami-ku, Hiroshima; Japan
- Operator: Hiroshima Electric Railway
- Lines: █ Hiroden Main Line; Route

Other information
- Station code: M2

History
- Opened: November 23, 1912
- Closed: August 3, 2025
Location

Enkobashi-cho is a former Hiroden station (tram stop) on Hiroden Main Line, located in Enkobashi-cho, Minami-ku, Hiroshima.

== Routes ==
With effect from 3 August 2025, routes 1, 2, 5 and 6 have been redirected to head straight to Inari-machi station from Hiroshima station.

== Connections ==
█ Main Line (Former)

Hiroshima Station — Enkobashi-cho — Matoba-cho

== Around station ==
- Enkobashi Bridge

== History ==
- Opened on November 23, 1912.
- Closed from May, 1942 to February 29, 1949.
- Reopened on March 1, 1949.
- Closed on August 3, 2025.

== See also ==
- Hiroden Streetcar Lines and Routes
