= List of railway stations in Japan =

The links below contain all of the railway stations in Japan: List of railway stations in Japan

| A | B | C | D | E | F | G | H | I | J | KL | M | N | O | P | R | S | T | U | W | Y | Z |

Railway stations map in Japan

== See also ==
- List of railway lines in Japan
- List of railway companies in Japan
- Rail transport in Japan
