= List of railway stations in Japan: M =

List of railway stations in Japan

A	B	C	D	E	F	G	H	I	J	KL	M	N	O	P	R	S	T	U	W	Y	Z

This list shows the railway stations in Japan that begin with the letter M. This is a subset of the full list of railway stations in Japan.

== Station list ==
=== Ma ===
Mabashi Station	馬橋駅（まばし）
Mabori-Kaigan Station	馬堀海岸駅（まぼりかいがん）
Machida Station (Odakyu)	町田駅（まちだ）
Machida Station (JR East)	町田駅（まちだ）
Machikata Station	町方駅（まちかた）
Machiya Station	町屋駅（まちや）
Machiya-ekimae Station	町屋駅前停留場（まちやえきまえ）
Machiya-nichōme Station	町屋二丁目停留場（まちやにちょうめ）
Mada Station	馬田駅（まだ）
Maebara Station	前原駅（まえばら）
Maebashi Station	前橋駅（まえばし）
Maebashi-Ōshima Station	前橋大島駅（まえばしおおしま）
Maedaminami Station	前田南駅（まえだみなみ）
Maegata Station	前潟駅（まえがた）
Maegō Station	前郷駅（まえごう）
Maehama Station	前浜駅（まえはま）
Maehirakōen Station	前平公園駅（まえひらこうえん）
Maekawa Station	前川駅 (新潟県)（まえかわ）
Maenohama Station	前之浜駅（まえのはま）
Maesawa Station	前沢駅（まえさわ）
Maeyachi Station	前谷地駅（まえやち）
Maeyama Station	前山駅（まえやま）
Maezora Station	前空駅（まえぞら）
Magae Station	馬替駅（まがえ）
Magarikane Station	勾金駅（まがりかね）
Magarisawa Station	曲沢駅（まがりさわ）
Magome Station	馬込駅（まごめ）
Magomezawa Station	馬込沢駅（まごめざわ）
Magura Station	真倉駅（まぐら）
Maibara Station	米原駅（まいばら）
Maidashi Kyūdaibyōin-mae Station	馬出九大病院前駅（まいだしきゅうだいびょういんまえ）
Maihama Station	舞浜駅（まいはま）
Maiko Station	舞子駅（まいこ）
Maikokōen Station	舞子公園駅（まいここうえん）
Maimatsubara Station	舞松原駅（まいまつばら）
Maioka Station	舞岡駅（まいおか）
Maisaka Station	舞阪駅（まいさか）
Maita Station (Kanagawa)	蒔田駅（まいた）
Maita Station (Nagano)	舞田駅（まいた）
Maji Station	馬路駅（まじ）
Majima Station	間島駅（まじま）
Maki Station (Niigata)	巻駅（まき）
Maki Station (Kyoto)	牧駅 (京都府)（まき）
Maki Station (Oita)	牧駅 (大分県)（まき）
Makimuku Station	巻向駅（まきむく）
Makino Station (Shiga)	マキノ駅（まきの）
Makino Station (Osaka)	牧野駅（まきの）
Makinokō Station	牧之郷駅（まきのこう）
Makiochi Station	牧落駅（まきおち）
Makishi Station	牧志駅（まきし）
Makiyama Station	牧山駅（まきやま）
Makomanai Station	真駒内駅（まこまない）
Makubetsu Station	幕別駅（まくべつ）
Makuhari Station	幕張駅（まくはり）
Makuharihongō Station	幕張本郷駅（まくはりほんごう）
Makuharitoyosuna Station	幕張豊砂駅（まくはりとよすな）
Makurazaki Station	枕崎駅（まくらざき）
Makuta Station	馬来田駅（まくた）
Mamada Station	間々田駅（ままだ）
Mamba Station	万場駅（まんば）
Mamurogawa Station	真室川駅（まむろがわ）
Managashi Station	馬流駅（まながし）
Managura Station	万能倉駅（まなぐら）
Manai Station	間内駅（まない）
Manazuru Station	真鶴駅（まなづる）
Manganji Station	万願寺駅（まんがんじ）
Mangatsuka Station	万ヶ塚駅（まんがつか）
Mangoku-Ura Station	万石浦駅（まんごくうら）
Maniwa Station	馬庭駅（まにわ）
Mantomi Station	万富駅（まんとみ）
Manseibashi Station	万世橋駅（まんせいばし）
Manza-Kazawaguchi Station	万座・鹿沢口駅（まんざ・かざわぐち）
Maoroshi Station	馬下駅（まおろし）
Mappu Station	真布駅（まっぷ）
Mareppu Station	稀府駅（まれっぷ）
Marine Park Station	マリンパーク駅
Marubuchi Station	丸渕駅（まるぶち）
Marugame Station	丸亀駅（まるがめ）
Marumori Station	丸森駅（まるもり）
Marunouchi Station (Kiyosu)	丸ノ内駅（まるのうち）
Marunouchi Station (Nagoya)	丸の内駅（まるのうち）
Marunouchi Station (Toyama)	丸の内停留場（まるのうち）
Maruo Station	丸尾駅（まるお）
Maruoka Station	丸岡駅（まるおか）
Maruseppu Station	丸瀬布駅（まるせっぷ）
Marutamachi Station	丸太町駅（まるたまち）
Maruyama Station (Hyogo)	丸山駅 (兵庫県)（まるやま）
Maruyama Station (Mie)	丸山駅 (三重県)（まるやま）
Maruyama Station (Saitama)	丸山駅 (埼玉県)（まるやま）
Maruyamakōen Station	円山公園駅（まるやまこうえん）
Maruyamashita Station	丸山下駅（まるやました）
Masaki Station (Ehime)	松前駅（まさき）
Masaki Station (Miyazaki)	真幸駅（まさき）
Masaru Station	真申駅（まさる）
Mashike Station	増毛駅（ましけ）
Mashiko Station	益子駅（ましこ）
Mashū Station	摩周駅（ましゅう）
Masuda Station	益田駅（ますだ）
Masuga Station	真菅駅（ますが）
Masukata Station	升形駅（ますかた）
Masuo Station (Mie)	益生駅（ますお）
Masuo Station (Chiba)	増尾駅（ますお）
Masuura Station	鱒浦駅（ますうら）
Masuzawa Station	鱒沢駅（ますざわ）
Mataki Station	真滝駅（またき）
Matoba Station	的場駅（まとば）
Matoba-cho Station	的場町停留場（まとばちょう）
Matogata Station	的形駅（まとがた）
Matō Station	間藤駅（まとう）
Matsuba Station	松葉駅（まつば）
Matsubara Station (Nagasaki)	松原駅 (長崎県)（まつばら）
Matsubara Station (Tokyo)	松原駅 (東京都)（まつばら）
Matsubarako Station	松原湖駅（まつばらこ）
Matsubase Station	松橋駅（まつばせ）
Matsuchi Station	真土駅（まつち）
Matsuda Station	松田駅（まつだ）
Matsudai Station	まつだい駅
Matsudo Station	松戸駅（まつど）
Matsudo-Shinden Station	松戸新田駅（まつどしんでん）
Matsue Station	松江駅（まつえ）
Matsue English Garden Mae Station	松江イングリッシュガーデン前駅（まつえいんぐりっしゅがーでんまえ）
Matsue Shinjiko-onsen Station	松江しんじ湖温泉駅（まつえしんじこおんせん）
Matsue Vogel Park Station	松江フォーゲルパーク駅（まつえふぉーげるぱーく）
Matsugasaki Station (Kyoto)	松ヶ崎駅 (京都府)（まつがさき）
Matsugasaki Station (Mie)	松ヶ崎駅 (三重県)（まつがさき）
Matsugaura Station	松ヶ浦駅（まつがうら）
Matsugaya Station	松が谷駅（まつがや）
Matsugishi Station	松岸駅（まつぎし）
Matsuhidai Station	松飛台駅（まつひだい）
Matsuhisa Station	松久駅（まつひさ）
Matsuida Station	松井田駅（まついだ）
Matsuiwa Station	松岩駅（まついわ）
Matsui-Yamate Station	松井山手駅（まついやまて）
Matsukami Station	松神駅（まつかみ）
Matsukawa Station	松川駅（まつかわ）
Matsukawa-cho Station	松川町停留場（まつかわちょう）
Matsukitai Station	松木平駅（まつきたい）
Matsukura Station	松倉駅（まつくら）
Matsukusa Station	松草駅（まつくさ）
Matsumaru Station	松丸駅（まつまる）
Matsumori Station	松森駅（まつもり）
Matsumoto Station	松本駅（まつもと）
Matsumoto Machiya Station	まつもと町屋駅（まつもとまちや）
Matsumushi Station	松虫駅（まつむし）
Matsunaga Station	松永駅（まつなが）
Matsunobamba Station	松ノ馬場駅（まつのばんば）
Matsunohama Station	松ノ浜駅（まつのはま）
Matsunoodera Station	松尾寺駅（まつのおでら）
Matsuo Station (Chiba)	松尾駅 (千葉県)（まつお）
Matsuo Station (Mie)	松尾駅 (三重県)（まつお）
Matsuo Station (Nagasaki)	松尾駅 (長崎県)（まつお）
Matsuo-Hachimantai Station	松尾八幡平駅（まつおはちまんたい）
Matsuoka Station	松岡駅（まつおか）
Matsuo-taisha Station	松尾大社駅（まつおたいしゃ）
Matsusaka Station	松阪駅（まつさか）
Matsushima Station	松島駅（まつしま）
Matsushima-Kaigan Station	松島海岸駅（まつしまかいがん）
Matsushima-Nichōme Station	松島二丁目駅（まつしまにちょうめ）
Matsushita Station	松下駅（まつした）
Matsuura Station	松浦駅（まつうら）
Matsuura Hatsudensho-mae Station	松浦発電所前駅（まつうらはつでんしょまえ）
Matsuyama Station (Ehime)	松山駅 (愛媛県)（まつやま）
Matsuyama Station (Fukuoka)	松山駅 (福岡県)（まつやま）
Matsuyamachi Station	松屋町駅（まつやまち）
Matsuyama-ekimae Station	松山駅前駅（まつやまえきまえ）
Matsuyama-Machi Station (Miyagi)	松山町駅（まつやままち）
Matsuyamashi Station	松山市駅（まつやまし）
Matsuyamashi-ekimae Station	松山市駅前駅（まつやましえきまえ）
Matsuzaki Station (Fukuoka)	松崎駅 (福岡県)（まつざき）
Matsuzaki Station (Tottori)	松崎駅 (鳥取県)（まつざき）
Matsuzuka Station	松塚駅（まつづか）
Mattō Station	松任駅（まっとう）
Maya Cable Station	摩耶ケーブル駅（まやけーぶる）
Maya Station	摩耶駅（まや）

=== Me ===
Mede Station	目出駅（めで）
Medical Center Station (Nagasaki)	メディカルセンター停留場（しみんびょういんまえ）
Mefujinja Station	売布神社駅（めふじんじゃ）
Mega Station (Hyogo)	妻鹿駅（めが）
Mega Station (Yamagata)	女鹿駅（めが）
Megumino Station	恵み野駅（めぐみの）
Meguro Station	目黒駅（めぐろ）
Meidaimae Station	明大前駅（めいだいまえ）
Meiden-Akasaka Station	名電赤坂駅（めいでんあかさか）
Meiden-Kakamigahara Station	名電各務原駅（めいでんかかみがはら）
Meiden-Nagasawa Station	名電長沢駅（めいでんながさわ）
Meiden-Yamanaka Station	名電山中駅（めいでんやまなか）
Meihō Station	明峰駅（めいほう）
Meiji-Jingūmae Station	明治神宮前駅（めいじじんぐうまえ）
Meijōkōen Station	名城公園駅（めいじょうこうえん）
Meinohama Station	姪浜駅（めいのはま）
Meitetsu Gifu Station	名鉄岐阜駅（めいてつぎふ）
Meitetsu Ichinomiya Station	名鉄一宮駅（めいてついちのみや）
Meitetsu Nagoya Station	名鉄名古屋駅（めいてつなごや）
Mejiro Station	目白駅（めじろ）
Mejirodai Station	めじろ台駅（めじろだい）
Mejiroyamashita Station	目白山下駅（めじろやました）
Memambetsu Station	女満別駅（めまんべつ）
Memuro Station	芽室駅（めむろ）
Mena Station	目名駅（めな）
Menden Station	免田駅（めんでん）
Meotoishi Station	夫婦石駅（めおといし）
Metoki Station	目時駅（めとき）

=== Mi ===
Miai Station	美合駅（みあい）
Mibu Station	壬生駅（みぶ）
Michikawa Station	道川駅（みちかわ）
Michinoo Station	道ノ尾駅（みちのお）
Michinoue Station	道上駅（みちのうえ）
Mida Station	箕田駅（みだ）
Midaibashi Station	三代橋駅（みだいばし）
Midami Station	美談駅（みだみ）
Midaregawa Station	乱川駅（みだれがわ）
Midō Station	御堂駅（みどう）
Midori Station (Gifu)	水鳥駅（みどり）
Midori Station (Hokkaidō)	緑駅（みどり）
Midoribashi Station	緑橋駅（みどりばし）
Midorichō Station	緑町駅（みどりちょう）
Midoridai Station	みどり台駅（みどりだい）
Midorigaoka Station (Hokkaido)	緑が丘駅 (北海道)（みどりがおか）
Midorigaoka Station (Hyogo)	緑が丘駅 (兵庫県)（みどりがおか）
Midorigaoka Station (Tokyo)	緑が丘駅 (東京都)（みどりがおか）
Midorii Station	緑井駅（みどりい）
Midorikawa Station	緑川駅（みどりかわ）
Midoriko Station	みどり湖駅（みどりこ）
Midorino Station	みどりの駅
Mie Station	三会駅（みえ）
Miebashi Station	美栄橋駅（みえばし）
Mieji Station	美江寺駅（みえじ）
Miemachi Station	三重町駅（みえまち）
Mihama Station	美浜駅（みはま）
Mihamaryokuen Station	美浜緑苑駅（みはまりょくえん）
Mihara Station	三原駅（みはら）
Miharashidai Station	見晴台駅（みはらしだい）
Miharu Station	三春駅（みはる）
Mihata Station	美旗駅（みはた）
Mihomisumi Station	三保三隅駅（みほみすみ）
Mii Station	御井駅（みい）
Miidera Station	三井寺駅（みいでら）
Miinohara Station	三井野原駅（みいのはら）
Mikado Station	三門駅（みかど）
Mikadodai Station	御門台駅（みかどだい）
Mikage Station (Hokkaido)	御影駅 (北海道)（みかげ）
Mikage Station (Hankyu)	御影駅 (阪急)（みかげ）
Mikage Station (Hanshin)	御影駅 (阪神)（みかげ）
Mikakino Station	三柿野駅（みかきの）
Mikamo Station	三加茂駅（みかも）
Mikanodai Station	美加の台駅（みかのだい）
Mikata Station	三方駅（みかた）
Mikawa Station (Hokkaido)	三川駅 (北海道)（みかわ）
Mikawa Station (Ishikawa)	美川駅（みかわ）
Mikawa Station (Niigata)	三川駅 (新潟県)（みかわ）
Mikawa-Anjō Station	三河安城駅（みかわあんじょう）
Mikawachi Station	三河内駅（みかわち）
Mikawa-Chiryū Station	三河知立駅（みかわちりゅう）
Mikawa-Ichinomiya Station	三河一宮駅（みかわいちのみや）
Mikawa-Kamigō Station	三河上郷駅（みかわかみごう）
Mikawa-Kashima Station	三河鹿島駅（みかわかしま）
Mikawa-Kawai Station	三河川合駅（みかわかわい）
Mikawa-Makihara Station	三河槙原駅（みかわまきはら）
Mikawa-Miya Station	三河三谷駅（みかわみや）
Mikawa-Ōno Station	三河大野駅（みかわおおの）
Mikawa-Ōtsuka Station	三河大塚駅（みかわおおつか）
Mikawashima Station	三河島駅（みかわしま）
Mikawa-Shiotsu Station	三河塩津駅（みかわしおつ）
Mikawa-Tahara Station	三河田原駅（みかわたはら）
Mikawa-Takahama Station	三河高浜駅（みかわたかはま）
Mikawa-Toba Station	三河鳥羽駅（みかわとば）
Mikawa-Tōgō Station	三河東郷駅（みかわとうごう）
Mikawa-Toyota Station	三河豊田駅（みかわとよた）
Mikawa-Yatsuhashi Station	三河八橋駅（みかわやつはし）
Mikayamaguchi Station	三ヶ山口駅（みかやまぐち）
Mikazuki Station	三日月駅（みかづき）
Mikekado Station	三毛門駅（みけかど）
Miki Station	三木駅 (神戸電鉄)（みき）
Mikisato Station	三木里駅（みきさと）
Miki-Uenomaru Station	三木上の丸駅（みきうえのまる）
Mikkabi Station	三ヶ日駅（みっかび）
Mikkaichi Station	三日市駅（みっかいち）
Mikkaichichō Station	三日市町駅（みっかいちちょう）
Mikumo Station	三雲駅（みくも）
Mikuni Station (Fukui)	三国駅 (福井県)（みくに）
Mikuni Station (Osaka)	三国駅 (大阪府)（みくに）
Mikunigaoka Station (Fukuoka)	三国が丘駅（みくにがおか）
Mikunigaoka Station (Osaka)	三国ヶ丘駅（みくにがおか）
Mikunijinja Station	三国神社駅（みくにじんじゃ）
Mikuniminato Station	三国港駅（みくにみなと）
Mikuriya Station (Nagasaki)	御厨駅 (長崎県)（みくりや）
Mikuriya Station (Shizuoka)	御厨駅 (静岡県)（みくりや）
Mikuriya Station (Tottori)	御来屋駅（みくりや）
Mimasaka Station	三間坂駅（みまさか）
Mimasaka-Doi Station	美作土居駅（みまさかどい）
Mimasaka-Emi Station	美作江見駅（みまさかえみ）
Mimasaka-Kamo Station	美作加茂駅（みまさかかも）
Mimasaka-Kawai Station	美作河井駅（みまさかかわい）
Mimasaka-Ochiai Station	美作落合駅（みまさかおちあい）
Mimasaka-Oiwake Station	美作追分駅（みまさかおいわけ）
Mimasaka-Ōsaki Station	美作大崎駅（みまさかおおさき）
Mimasaka-Sendai Station	美作千代駅（みまさかせんだい）
Mimasaka-Takio Station	美作滝尾駅（みまさかたきお）
Mimata Station	三股駅（みまた）
Miminashi Station	耳成駅（みみなし）
Mimitsu Station	美々津駅（みみつ）
Mimmaya Station	三厩駅（みんまや）
Mimomi Station	実籾駅（みもみ）
Mimurodo Station	三室戸駅（みむろど）
Minabe Station	南部駅（みなべ）
Minagi Station	美袋駅（みなぎ）
Minakami Station	水上駅（みなかみ）
Minakuchi Station	水口駅（みなくち）
Minakuchi-Ishibashi Station	水口石橋駅（みなくちいしばし）
Minakuchi-Jōnan Station	水口城南駅（みなくちじょうなん）
Minakuchi-Matsuo Station	水口松尾駅（みなくちまつお）
Minamata Station	水俣駅（みなまた）
Minami-Anjo Station	南安城駅（みなみあんじょう）
Minami-arako Station	南荒子駅（みなみあらこ）
Minami-Arao Station	南荒尾駅（みなみあらお）
Minami-Asagaya Station	南阿佐ヶ谷駅（みなみあさがや）
Minamiaso Mizu-no-Umareru-Sato Hakusui-Kōgen Station	南阿蘇水の生まれる里白水高原駅（みなみあそみずのうまれるさとはくすいこうげん）
Minamiaso-Shirakawasuigen Station	南阿蘇白川水源駅（みなみあそしらかわすいげん）
Minami-Bifuka Station	南美深駅（みなみびふか）
Minami-Chitose Station	南千歳駅（みなみちとせ）
Minamichōkai Station	南鳥海駅（みなみちょうかい）
Minamidaira Station	南平駅（みなみだいら）
Minami-Daitō Station	南大東駅（みなみだいとう）
Minami-Dewa Station	南出羽駅（みなみでわ）
Minami-Fukuoka Station	南福岡駅（みなみふくおか）
Minami-Fukushima Station	南福島駅（みなみふくしま）
Minami-Funabashi Station	南船橋駅（みなみふなばし）
Minami-Furuya Station	南古谷駅（みなみふるや）
Minamigaoka Station	南が丘駅（みなみがおか）
Minami-Gōchi Station	南河内駅（みなみごうち）
Minami-Gotemba Station	南御殿場駅（みなみごてんば）
Minami-Gyōtoku Station	南行徳駅（みなみぎょうとく）
Minami-Hakui Station	南羽咋駅（みなみはくい）
Minami-Hanyū Station	南羽生駅（みなみはにゅう）
Minamihara Station	南三原駅（みなみはら）
Minami-Hashimoto Station	南橋本駅（みなみはしもと）
Minami-Hatogaya Station	南鳩ヶ谷駅（みなみはとがや）
Minami-Hikone Station	南彦根駅（みなみひこね）
Minami-Hinaga Station	南日永駅（みなみひなが）
Minami-Hiragishi Station	南平岸駅（みなみひらぎし）
Minami-Horibata Station	南堀端駅（みなみほりばた）
Minami-Hyūga Station	南日向駅（みなみひゅうが）
Minami-Ibaraki Station	南茨木駅（みなみいばらき）
Minami-Ikoma Station	南生駒駅（みなみいこま）
Minami-Imajō Station	南今庄駅（みなみいまじょう）
Minami-Ishige Station	南石下駅（みなみいしげ）
Minami-Ishii Station	南石井駅（みなみいしい）
Minami-Ito Station	南伊東駅（みなみいとう）
Minami-Iwakuni Station	南岩国駅（みなみいわくに）
Minami-Iyo Station	南伊予駅（みなみいよ）
Minamijuku Station	南宿駅（みなみじゅく）
Minami-Kagiya Station	南加木屋駅（みなみかぎや）
Minami-Kagoshima Station	南鹿児島駅（みなみかごしま）
Minamikagoshima-ekimae Station	南鹿児島駅前駅（みなみかごしまえきまえ）
Minami-Kakuda Station	南角田駅（みなみかくだ）
Minami-Kamishiro Station	南神城駅（みなみかみしろ）
Minami-Kariyasu Station	美並苅安駅（みなみかりやす）
Minami-Kashiwa Station	南柏駅（みなみかしわ）
Minamikata Station (Miyazaki)	南方駅 (宮崎県)（みなみかた）
Minamikata Station (Osaka)	南方駅 (大阪府)（みなみかた）
Minami-Kesennuma Station	南気仙沼駅（みなみけせんぬま）
Minami-Kodakaraonsen Station	みなみ子宝温泉駅（みなみこだからおんせん）
Minami-Kokura Station	南小倉駅（みなみこくら）
Minami-Komatsushima Station	南小松島駅（みなみこまつしま）
Minami-Koshigaya Station	南越谷駅（みなみこしがや）
Minami-Kōen Station	南公園駅（みなみこうえん）
Minami-Kōfu Station	南甲府駅（みなみこうふ）
Minami-Kumamoto Station	南熊本駅（みなみくまもと）
Minami-Kurihashi Station	南栗橋駅（みなみくりはし）
Minami-Kurume Station	南久留米駅（みなみくるめ）
Minami-Kusatsu Station	南草津駅（みなみくさつ）
Minami-kuyakusho-mae Station	南区役所前駅（みなみくやくしょまえ）
Minamimachi Station	南町駅（みなみまち）
Minami-machi 2-chome Station	皆実町二丁目停留場（みなみまちにちょうめ）
Minami-machi 6-chome Station	皆実町六丁目駅（みなみまちろくちょうめ）
Minami-machida Grandberry Park Station	南町田グランベリーパーク駅（みなみまちだぐらんべりーぱーく）
Minami-Makigahara Station	南万騎が原駅（みなみまきがはら）
Minami-Matsumoto Station	南松本駅（みなみまつもと）
Minami-Miyazaki Station	南宮崎駅（みなみみやざき）
Minami-morimachi Station	南森町駅（みなみもりまち）
Minami-Moriya Station	南守谷駅（みなみもりや）
Minami-Nagai Station	南長井駅（みなみながい）
Minami-Nagaoka Station	南長岡駅（みなみながおか）
Minami-Nagareyama Station	南流山駅（みなみながれやま）
Minami-Nagayama Station	南永山駅（みなみながやま）
Minami-Nakagawa Station	南中川駅（みなみなかがわ）
Minami-Nakagō Station	南中郷駅（みなみなかごう）
Minamino Station	南野駅（みなみの）
Minami-Nobeoka Station	南延岡駅（みなみのべおか）
Minami-Nōgata Gotenguchi Station	南直方御殿口駅（みなみのおがたごてんぐち）
Minami-Ōdaka Station	南大高駅（みなみおおだか）
Minami-Onoda Station	南小野田駅（みなみおのだ）
Minami-Ōita Station	南大分駅（みなみおおいた）
Minami-Ōmachi Station	南大町駅（みなみおおまち）
Minami-Ōmine Station	南大嶺駅（みなみおおみね）
Minami-Ōsawa Station	南大沢駅（みなみおおさわ）
Minami-Ōta Station	南太田駅（みなみおおた）
Minami-Ōtsuka Station	南大塚駅（みなみおおつか）
Minami-Otari Station	南小谷駅（みなみおたり）
Minami-Otaru Station	南小樽駅（みなみおたる）
Minami-Pippu Station	南比布駅（みなみぴっぷ）
Minami-Rinkan Station	南林間駅（みなみりんかん）
Minami-Sagae Station	南寒河江駅（みなみさがえ）
Minamisakae Station	南栄駅（みなみさかえ）
Minami-Sakaide Station	南酒出駅（みなみさかいで）
Minami Sakurai Station (Aichi)	南桜井駅 (愛知県)（みなみさくらい）
Minami-Sakurai Station (Saitama)	南桜井駅 (埼玉県)（みなみさくらい）
Minami-Sendai Station	南仙台駅（みなみせんだい）
Minami-Senju Station	南千住駅（みなみせんじゅ）
Minami-Senri Station	南千里駅（みなみせんり）
Minami-Setaka Station	南瀬高駅（みなみせたか）
Minami-Settsu Station	南摂津駅（みなみせっつ）
Minami-Shari Station	南斜里駅（みなみしゃり）
Minami-Shiga Station	南滋賀駅（みなみしが）
Minami-Shimabara Station	南島原駅（みなみしまばら）
Minami-Shimizusawa Station	南清水沢駅（みなみしみずさわ）
Minami-Shimonuma Station	南下沼駅（みなみしもぬま）
Minami-Shimotoppu Station	南下徳富駅（みなみしもとっぷ）
Minami-Shinji Station	南宍道駅（みなみしんじ）
Minami-Shinjō Station	南新庄駅（みなみしんじょう）
Minami-Shinjuku Station	南新宿駅（みなみしんじゅく）
Minami-Shisui Station	南酒々井駅（みなみしすい）
Minami-Suita Station	南吹田駅（みなみすいた）
Minami-Sunamachi Station	南砂町駅（みなみすなまち）
Minami-Takada Station	南高田駅（みなみたかだ）
Minami-Takasaki Station	南高崎駅（みなみたかさき）
Minami-Tama Station	南多摩駅（みなみたま）
Minami-Tanabe Station	南田辺駅（みなみたなべ）
Minami-Tatsumi Station	南巽駅（みなみたつみ）
Minami-Teshikaga Station	南弟子屈駅（みなみてしかが）
Minami-Toyama Station	南富山駅（みなみとやま）
Minamitoyama-ekimae Station	南富山駅前駅（みなみとやまえきまえ）
Minami-Toyoshina Station	南豊科駅（みなみとよしな）
Minami-Uozaki Station	南魚崎駅（みなみうおざき）
Minami-Urawa Station	南浦和駅（みなみうらわ）
Minami-Utsunomiya Station	南宇都宮駅（みなみうつのみや）
Minami-Wakamatsu Station	南若松駅（みなみわかまつ）
Minami-Wakkanai Station	南稚内駅（みなみわっかない）
Minami Woody Town Station	南ウッディタウン駅（みなみうっでぃたうん）
Minami-Yashiro Station	南矢代駅（みなみやしろ）
Minami-Yokkaichi Station	南四日市駅（みなみよっかいち）
Minami-Yonezawa Station	南米沢駅（みなみよねざわ）
Minami-Yono Station	南与野駅（みなみよの）
Minami-yorii Station	みなみ寄居駅（みなみよりい）
Minami-Yoshida Station	南吉田駅（みなみよしだ）
Minami-Yufu Station	南由布駅（みなみゆふ）
Minami-Yukuhashi Station	南行橋駅（みなみゆくはし）
Minano Station	皆野駅（みなの）
Minara Station	見奈良駅（みなら）
Minase Station	水無瀬駅（みなせ）
Minato Station	湊駅（みなと）
Minatochō Station	港町駅（みなとちょう）
Minatogawa Station	湊川駅（みなとがわ）
Minatogawakōen Station	湊川公園駅（みなとがわこうえん）
Minatojima Station	みなとじま駅（みなとじま）
Minato Kuyakusho Station	港区役所駅（みなとくやくしょ）
Minatomirai Station	みなとみらい駅
Minatomotomachi Station	みなと元町駅（みなともとまち）
Minatoyama Station	港山駅（みなとやま）
Minawa Station	三縄駅（みなわ）
Mine Station	美祢駅（みね）
Mine Station (Tochigi)	峰停留場（みね）
Minenobu Station	峰延駅（みねのぶ）
Mineyama Station	峰山駅（みねやま）
Mineyoshikawa Station	峰吉川駅（みねよしかわ）
Mino Station	みの駅
Mino-Akasaka Station	美濃赤坂駅（みのあかさか）
Minobayashi Station	見能林駅（みのばやし）
Minobu Station	身延駅（みのぶ）
Minohamagakuen Station	美乃浜学園駅（みのはまがくえん）
Minoh-kayano Station	箕面萱野駅（みのおかやの）
Mino-Hongō Station	美濃本郷駅（みのほんごう）
Minoh-semba handai-mae Station	箕面船場阪大前駅（みのおせんばはんだいまえ）
Mino-Kawai Station	美濃川合駅（みのかわい）
Mino-Matsuyama Station	美濃松山駅（みのまつやま）
Minoo Station	箕面駅（みのお）
Mino-Ōkubo Station	美濃大久保駅（みのおおくぼ）
Mino-Ōta Station	美濃太田駅（みのおおた）
Minoridai Station	みのり台駅（みのりだい）
Mino-Sakamoto Station	美乃坂本駅（みのさかもと）
Minose Station	三野瀬駅（みのせ）
Minoshi Station	美濃市駅（みのし）
Minoshima Station	箕島駅（みのしま）
Mino-Shirotori Station	美濃白鳥駅（みのしろとり）
Mino-Takada Station	美濃高田駅（みのたかだ）
Minotani Station	箕谷駅（みのたに）
Mino-Tsuya Station	美濃津屋駅（みのつや）
Minoura Station	箕浦駅（みのうら）
Minowa Station	三ノ輪駅（みのわ）
Minowabashi Station	三ノ輪橋駅（みのわばし）
Mino-Yamazaki Station	美濃山崎駅（みのやまざき）
Mino-Yanagi Station	美濃青柳駅（みのやなぎ）
Minumadai-shinsuikōen Station	見沼代親水公園駅（みぬまだいしんすいこうえん）
Miraidaira Station	みらい平駅（みらいだいら）
Mirasaka Station	三良坂駅（みらさか）
Mirozu Station	見老津駅（みろづ）
Misaki Station (Hokkaido)	御崎駅（みさき）
Misaki Station (Chiba)	三咲駅（みさき）
Misakigaoka Station	美咲が丘駅（みさきがおか）
Misakiguchi Station	三崎口駅（みさきぐち）
Misakikōen Station (Osaka)	みさき公園駅（みさきこうえん）
Misakikōen Station (Hyogo)	御崎公園駅（みさきこうえん）
Misakubo Station	水窪駅（みさくぼ）
Misasagi Station	御陵駅（みささぎ）
Misashima Station	美佐島駅（みさしま）
Misato Station (Mie)	三里駅（みさと）
Misato Station (Nagano)	美里駅（みさと）
Misato Station (Saitama)	三郷駅 (埼玉県)（みさと）
Misatochūō Station	三郷中央駅（みさとちゅうおう）
Misawa Station	三沢駅 (青森県)（みさわ）
Misedani Station	三瀬谷駅（みせだに）
Mishima Station	三島駅（みしま）
Mishima-Futsukamachi Station	三島二日町駅（みしまふつかまち）
Mishima-Hirokōji Station	三島広小路駅（みしまひろこうじ）
Mishima-Tamachi Station	三島田町駅（みしまたまち）
Misono Station	美園駅（みその）
Misono-Chūōkōen Station	美薗中央公園駅（みそのちゅうおうこうえん）
Misumi Station	三角駅（みすみ）
Mita Station	三田駅 (東京都)（みた）
Mitaka Station	三鷹駅（みたか）
Mitakadai Station	三鷹台駅（みたかだい）
Mitake Station (Gifu)	御嵩駅（みたけ）
Mitake Station (Tokyo)	御嶽駅（みたけ）
Mitakedaira Station	御岳平駅（みたけだいら）
Mitakedō Station	御岳堂駅（みたけどう）
Mitakeguchi Station	御嵩口駅（みたけぐち）
Mitakesan Station	御岳山駅（みたけさん）
Mitaki Station	三滝駅（みたき）
Mitani Station (Okayama)	三谷駅 (岡山県)（みたに）
Mitani Station (Yamaguchi)	三谷駅 (山口県)（みたに）
Mitazono Station	美田園駅（みたぞの）
Mitejima Station	御幣島駅（みてじま）
Mito Station (Ibaraki)	水戸駅（みと）
Mito Station (Osaka)	弥刀駅（みと）
Mitoma Station	三苫駅（みとま）
Mitsu Station	三津駅（みつ）
Mitsubishi-jikō-mae Station	三菱自工前駅（みつびしじこうまえ）
Mitsuhama Station	三津浜駅（みつはま）
Mitsuishi Station (Kumamoto)	三ツ石駅（みついし）
Mitsuishi Station (Okayama)	三石駅（みついし）
Mitsukaidō Station	水海道駅（みつかいどう）
Mitsuke Station	見附駅（みつけ）
Mitsukoshimae Station	三越前駅（みつこしまえ）
Mitsukuchi Station	三口駅（みつくち）
Mitsukyō Station	三ツ境駅（みつきょう）
Mitsuma Station	三妻駅（みつま）
Mitsumata Station	三俣駅（みつまた）
Mitsumatsu Station (Fukui)	三松駅（みつまつ）
Mitsumatsu Station (Osaka)	三ツ松駅（みつまつ）
Mitsumineguchi Station	三峰口駅（みつみねぐち）
Mitsuoka Station	三岡駅（みつおか）
Mitsusawa Station	三沢駅 (福岡県)（みつさわ）
Mitsuseki Station	三関駅（みつせき）
Mitsutōge Station	三つ峠駅（みつとうげ）
Mitsuwadai Station	みつわ台駅（みつわだい）
Mitsuya Station	三ツ屋駅（みつや）
Mitsuzawa-Kamichō Station	三ツ沢上町駅（みつざわかみちょう）
Mitsuzawa-Shimochō Station	三ツ沢下町駅（みつざわしもちょう）
Miura Station	三浦駅（みうら）
Miurakaigan Station	三浦海岸駅（みうらかいがん）
Miwa Station	三輪駅（みわ）
Miwasaki Station	三輪崎駅（みわさき）
Miyada Station	宮田駅（みやだ）
Miyazu Station	宮津駅（みやづ）
Miyagahama Station	宮ヶ浜駅（みやがはま）
Miyagawa Station	宮川駅（みやがわ）
Miyagino-dori Station	宮城野通駅（みやぎのどおり）
Miyaginohara Station	宮城野原駅（みやぎのはら）
Miyaguchi Station	宮口駅（みやぐち）
Miyahara Station	宮原駅（みやはら）
Miyaji Station	宮地駅（みやじ）
Miyajima Boat Race Jō Station	宮島ボートレース場駅（みやじまぼーとれーすじょう）
Miyajimaguchi Station	宮島口駅（みやじまぐち）
Miyake-Hachiman Station	三宅八幡駅（みやけはちまん）
Miyaki Station	宮木駅（みやき）
Miyako Station	宮古駅（みやこ）
Miyakoda Station	都田駅（みやこだ）
Miyakoizumi Station	美夜古泉駅（みやこいずみ）
Miyakojima Station	都島駅（みやこじま）
Miyakonojō Station	都城駅（みやこのじょう）
Miyakoshi Station	宮越駅（みやこし）
Miyama Station	美山駅（みやま）
Miyamachi Station	宮町駅（みやまち）
Miyamado Station	海山道駅（みやまど）
Miyamae Station	宮前駅（みやまえ）
Miyamaedaira Station	宮前平駅（みやまえだいら）
Miyamaki Station	三山木駅（みやまき）
Miyamori Station	宮守駅（みやもり）
Miyamoto Musashi Station	宮本武蔵駅（みやもとむさし）
Miyamura Station	宮村駅（みやむら）
Miyano Station	宮野駅（みやの）
Miyanohira Station	宮ノ平駅（みやのひら）
Miyanojin Station	宮の陣駅（みやのじん）
Miyanokoshi Station	宮ノ越駅（みやのこし）
Miyanomae Station	宮ノ前停留場（みやのまえ）
Miyanosaka Station (Tokyo)	宮の坂駅（みやのさか）
Miyanosaka Station (Osaka)	宮之阪駅（みやのさか）
Miyanosawa Station	宮の沢駅（みやのさわ）
Miyanoshita Station	宮ノ下駅（みやのした）
Miyashita Station	宮下駅 (福島県)（みやした）
Miyatachō Station	宮田町駅（みやたちょう）
Miyauchi Station (Hiroshima)	宮内駅 (広島県)（みやうち）
Miyauchi Station (Niigata)	宮内駅 (新潟県)（みやうち）
Miyauchi Station (Yamagata)	宮内駅 (山形県)（みやうち）
Miyauchikushido Station	宮内串戸駅（みやうちくしど）
Miyawaki Station	宮脇駅（みやわき）
Miyayama Station	宮山駅（みややま）
Miyazaki Station	宮崎駅（みやざき）
Miyazakidai Station	宮崎台駅（みやざきだい）
Miyazakijingū Station	宮崎神宮駅（みやざきじんぐう）
Miyazakikūkō Station	宮崎空港駅（みやざきくうこう）
Miyoshi Station (Kumamoto)	御代志駅（みよし）
Miyoshi Station (Hiroshima)	三次駅（みよし）
Miyoshichō Station	三好町駅（みよしちょう）
Miyoshigaoka Station	三好ヶ丘駅（みよしがおか）
Miyota Station	御代田駅（みよた）
Miyuki-bashi Station	御幸橋駅（みゆきばし）
Miyukitsuji Station	御幸辻駅（みゆきつじ）
Mizoguchi Station	溝口駅（みぞぐち）
Mizonokuchi Station	溝の口駅（みぞのくち）
Mizue Station	瑞江駅（みずえ）
Mizuhashi Station	水橋駅（みずはし）
Mizuho Station	瑞穂駅（みずほ）
Mizuhodai Station	みずほ台駅（みずほだい）
Mizuho-Kuyakusho Station	瑞穂区役所駅（みずほくやくしょ）
Mizuho-Undōjō-Higashi Station	瑞穂運動場東駅（みずほうんどうじょうひがし）
Mizuho-Undōjō-Nishi Station	瑞穂運動場西駅（みずほうんどうじょうにし）
Mizui Station	水居駅（みずい）
Mizuki Station	水城駅（みずき）
Mizuma Station	三潴駅（みずま）
Mizuma Kannon Station	水間観音駅（みずまかんのん）
Mizumaki Station	水巻駅（みずまき）
Mizunami Station	瑞浪駅（みずなみ）
Mizunarikawa Station	水成川駅（みずなりかわ）
Mizuno Station	水野駅（みずの）
Mizunuma Station	水沼駅（みずぬま）
Mizuochi Station	水落駅（みずおち）
Mizusawa Station	水沢駅（みずさわ）
Mizusawa-Esashi Station	水沢江刺駅（みずさわえさし）
Mizushima Station	水島駅（みずしま）
Mizushiri Station	水尻駅（みずしり）
Mizuta Station	水田駅（みずた）

=== Mo-Mt ===
Mobara Station	茂原駅（もばら）
Mochibaru Station	餅原駅（もちばる）
Mochida Station	持田駅（もちだ）
Mochigase Station	用瀬駅（もちがせ）
Mochimune Station	用宗駅（もちむね）
Mogami Station	最上駅（もがみ）
Mōgi Station	舞木駅（もうぎ）
Mogusaen Station	百草園駅（もぐさえん）
Moheji Station	茂辺地駅（もへじ）
Moichi Station	茂市駅（もいち）
Moji Station	門司駅（もじ）
Mojikō Station	門司港駅（もじこう）
Mokichi Kinenkan-mae Station	茂吉記念館前駅（もきちきねんかんまえ）
Mokoto Station	藻琴駅（もこと）
Momiyama Station	樅山駅（もみやま）
Momodani Station	桃谷駅（ももだに）
Momonokawa Station	桃川駅（もものかわ）
Momouchi Station	桃内駅（ももうち）
Momoura Station	桃浦駅（ももうら）
Momoyama Station	桃山駅（ももやま）
Momoyamadai Station	桃山台駅（ももやまだい）
Momoyama-Goryōmae Station	桃山御陵前駅（ももやまごりょうまえ）
Momoyama-Minamiguchi Station	桃山南口駅（ももやまみなみぐち）
Momozono Station	桃園駅（ももぞの）
Momponai Station	紋穂内駅（もんぽない）
Monden Station	門田駅（もんでん）
Mondoyakujin Station	門戸厄神駅（もんどやくじん）
Monoi Station	物井駅（ものい）
Monorail Hamamatsuchō Station	モノレール浜松町駅（ものれーるはままつちょう）
Monshizu Station	門静駅（もんしず）
Monzennakachō Station	門前仲町駅（もんぜんなかちょう）
Mooka Station	真岡駅（もおか）
Morera-Gifu Station	モレラ岐阜駅（もれらぎふ）
Mori Station (Hokkaidō)	森駅 (北海道)（もり）
Mori Station (Osaka)	森駅 (大阪府)（もり）
Moriguchi Station (Nagano)	森口駅（もりぐち）
Moriguchi Station (Osaka)	守口駅（もりぐち）
Moriguchishi Station	守口市駅（もりぐちし）
Morikami Station	森上駅（もりかみ）
Morimachibyōin-mae Station	森町病院前駅（もりまちびょういんまえ）
Mori-Miyanohara Station	森宮野原駅（もりみやのはら）
Morimoto Station	森本駅（もりもと）
Morinjimae Station	茂林寺前駅（もりんじまえ）
Morinomiya Station	森ノ宮駅（もりのみや）
Morioka Station	盛岡駅（もりおか）
Morioka Kamotsu Terminal Station	盛岡貨物ターミナル駅（もりおかかもつたーみなる）
Morisekinoshita Station	杜せきのした駅（もりせきのした）
Morishita Station (Aichi)	森下駅 (愛知県)（もりした）
Morishita Station (Fukuoka)	森下駅 (福岡県)（もりした）
Morishita Station (Tokyo)	森下駅 (東京都)（もりした）
Morishōji Station	森小路駅（もりしょうじ）
Morita Station	森田駅（もりた）
Moritake Station	森岳駅（もりたけ）
Moritsune Station	守恒駅（もりつね）
Moriya Station	守谷駅（もりや）
Moriyama Station (Aichi)	守山駅 (愛知県)（もりやま）
Moriyama Station (Nagasaki)	森山駅（もりやま）
Moriyama Station (Shiga)	守山駅 (滋賀県)（もりやま）
Moriyama-Jieitaimae Station	守山自衛隊前駅（もりやまじえいたいまえ）
Moriyama-Shiminbyōin Station	守山市民病院駅（もりやましみんびょういん）
Moro Station	毛呂駅（もろ）
Moroyose Station	諸寄駅（もろよせ）
Moseushi Station	妹背牛駅（もせうし）
Moshiri Station	茂尻駅（もしり）
Motateyama Station	もたて山駅（もたてやま）
Motegi Station	茂木駅（もてぎ）
Moto-Chōshi Station	本銚子駅（もとちょうし）
Motohasunuma Station	本蓮沼駅（もとはすぬま）
Moto-Hoshizaki Station	本星崎駅（もとほしざき）
Motojuku Station (Aichi)	本宿駅 (愛知県)（もとじゅく）
Motojuku Station (Gunma)	本宿駅 (群馬県)（もとじゅく）
Motokaji Station	元加治駅（もとかじ）
Moto-Kasadera Station	本笠寺駅（もとかさでら）
Motomachi Station (Hokkaido)	元町駅 (北海道)（もとまち）
Motomachi Station (Hyogo)	元町駅 (兵庫県)（もとまち）
Motomachi Chūkagai Station	元町・中華街駅（もとまち・ちゅうかがい）
Motomiya Station	本宮駅 (福島県)（もとみや）
Moto-Nakagoya Station	本中小屋駅（もとなかごや）
Motosanjōguchi Station	元山上口駅（もとさんじょうぐち）
Motosu Station	本巣駅（もとす）
Motosumiyoshi Station	元住吉駅（もとすみよし）
Mototanaka Station	元田中駅（もとたなか）
Mototate Station	本楯駅（もとたて）
Moto-Wanishi Station	本輪西駅（もとわにし）
Motoyama Station (Aichi)	本山駅 (愛知県)（もとやま）
Motoyama Station (Chiba)	元山駅 (千葉県)（もとやま）
Motoyama Station (Takamatsu)	元山駅 (香川県)（もとやま）
Motoyama Station (Mitoyo)	本山駅 (香川県)（もとやま）
Motoyama Station (Nagasaki)	本山駅 (長崎県)（もとやま）
Motoyawata Station	本八幡駅（もとやわた）
Motoyoshi Station	本吉駅（もとよし）
Motozenkōji Station	元善光寺駅（もとぜんこうじ）
Mozu Station	百舌鳥駅（もず）
Mozuhachiman Station	百舌鳥八幡駅（もずはちまん）
Mt. Fuji Station	富士山駅

=== Mu ===
Muda Station	六田駅（むだ）
Muden Station	務田駅（むでん）
Mugi Station	牟岐駅（むぎ）
Muikamachi Station	六日町駅（むいかまち）
Mukaibara Station	向井原駅（むかいばら）
Mukaichiba Station	向市場駅（むかいちば）
Mukaigawara Station	向河原駅（むかいがわら）
Mukaihama Station	向浜駅（むかいはま）
Mukaihara Station	向原駅（むかいはら）
Mukaijima Station	向島駅（むかいじま）
Mukainada Station	向洋駅（むかいなだ）
Mukainoharu Station	向之原駅（むかいのはる）
Mukai-Noshiro Station	向能代駅（むかいのしろ）
Mukaisenoue Station	向瀬上駅（むかいせのうえ）
Mukaiyama Station	向山駅（むかいやま）
Mukawa Station	鵡川駅（むかわ）
Muko Station	武庫駅（むこ）
Mukōgaoka Station	向ヶ丘駅（むこうがおか）
Mukōgaokayūen Station	向ヶ丘遊園駅（むこうがおかゆうえん）
Mukogawa Station	武庫川駅（むこがわ）
Mukogawadanchimae Station	武庫川団地前駅（むこがわだんちまえ）
Mukōhara Station	向原停留場（むこうはら）
Mukōmachi Station	向日町駅（むこうまち）
Mukonosō Station	武庫之荘駅（むこのそう）
Mukuno Station	椋野駅（むくの）
Murai Station	村井駅（むらい）
Murakami Station (Chiba)	村上駅 (千葉県)（むらかみ）
Murakami Station (Niigata)	村上駅 (新潟県)（むらかみ）
Murano Station	村野駅（むらの）
Murasaki Station	紫駅（むらさき）
Murasakino Station	村崎野駅（むらさきの）
Murayama Station (Nagano)	村山駅 (長野県)（むらやま）
Murayama Station (Yamagata)	村山駅 (山形県)（むらやま）
Mure Station	牟礼駅（むれ）
Muro Station	室駅（むろ）
Murodō Station	室堂駅（むろどう）
Muromi Station	室見駅（むろみ）
Muroran Station	室蘭駅（むろらん）
Murōguchi-Ōno Station	室生口大野駅（むろうぐちおおの）
Musa Station (Hokkaido)	武佐駅 (北海道)（むさ）
Musa Station (Shiga)	武佐駅 (滋賀県)（むさ）
Musashi-Fujisawa Station	武蔵藤沢駅（むさしふじさわ）
Musashi-Hikida Station	武蔵引田駅（むさしひきだ）
Musashi-Itsukaichi Station	武蔵五日市駅（むさしいつかいち）
Musashi-Koganei Station	武蔵小金井駅（むさしこがねい）
Musashi-Kosugi Station	武蔵小杉駅（むさしこすぎ）
Musashi-Koyama Station	武蔵小山駅（むさしこやま）
Musashi-Masuko Station	武蔵増戸駅（むさしますこ）
Musashi-Mizonokuchi Station	武蔵溝ノ口駅（むさしみぞのくち）
Musashi-Nakahara Station	武蔵中原駅（むさしなかはら）
Musashi-Nitta Station	武蔵新田駅（むさしにった）
Musashinodai Station	武蔵野台駅（むさしのだい）
Musashi-Ranzan Station	武蔵嵐山駅（むさしらんざん）
Musashi-Sakai Station	武蔵境駅（むさしさかい）
Musashi-Seki Station	武蔵関駅（むさしせき）
Musashi-Shinjō Station	武蔵新城駅（むさししんじょう）
Musashi-Shiraishi Station	武蔵白石駅（むさししらいし）
Musashi-Sunagawa Station	武蔵砂川駅（むさしすながわ）
Musashi-Takahagi Station	武蔵高萩駅（むさしたかはぎ）
Musashi-Urawa Station	武蔵浦和駅（むさしうらわ）
Musashi-Yamato Station	武蔵大和駅（むさしやまと）
Musashi-Yokote Station	武蔵横手駅（むさしよこて）
Musashizuka Station	武蔵塚駅（むさしづか）
Mushigawa-Ōsugi Station	虫川大杉駅（むしがわおおすぎ）
Musota Station	六十谷駅（むそた）
Mutsuai-Nichidaimae Station	六会日大前駅（むつあいにちだいまえ）
Mutsu-Akaishi Station	陸奥赤石駅（むつあかいし）
Mutsu-Ichikawa Station	陸奥市川駅（むついちかわ）
Mutsu-Iwasaki Station	陸奥岩崎駅（むついわさき）
Mutsumi Station	六実駅（むつみ）
Mutsu-Minato Station	陸奥湊駅（むつみなと）
Mutsu-Morita Station	陸奥森田駅（むつもりた）
Mutsuna Station	六名駅（むつな）
Mutsu-Sawabe Station	陸奥沢辺駅（むつさわべ）
Mutsu-Shirahama Station	陸奥白浜駅（むつしらはま）
Mutsu-Tsuruda Station	陸奥鶴田駅（むつつるだ）
Mutsuura Station	六浦駅（むつうら）
Mutsu-Yanagita Station	陸奥柳田駅（むつやなぎた）
Mutsu-Yokohama Station	陸奥横浜駅（むつよこはま）
Muya Station	撫養駅（むや）

=== My ===
Myōdani Station	名谷駅（みょうだに）
Myōden Station	妙典駅（みょうでん）
Myōgadani Station	茗荷谷駅（みょうがだに）
Myōhōji Station (Hyogo)	妙法寺駅 (兵庫県)（みょうほうじ）
Myōhōji Station (Niigata)	妙法寺駅 (新潟県)（みょうほうじ）
Myōji Station	妙寺駅（みょうじ）
Myōjin Station	明神駅（みょうじん）
Myōjō Station	明星駅（みょうじょう）
Myōkaku Station	明覚駅（みょうかく）
Myōkenguchi Station	妙見口駅（みょうけんぐち）
Myōkennomizu-Hirobamae Station	妙見の水広場前駅（みょうけんのみずひろばまえ）
Myōkensan Station	妙見山駅（みょうけんさん）
Myōkōji Station	妙興寺駅（みょうこうじ）
Myōkō-Kōgen Station	妙高高原駅（みょうこうこうげん）
Myōkokujimae Station	妙国寺前駅（みょうこくじまえ）
Myōondōri Station	妙音通駅（みょうおんどおり）
Myōrenji Station	妙蓮寺駅（みょうれんじ）
Myōshinji Station	妙心寺駅（みょうしんじ）
