= Nagose Station =

Railway station in Kaizuka, Osaka Prefecture, Japan

Nagose Station 名越駅
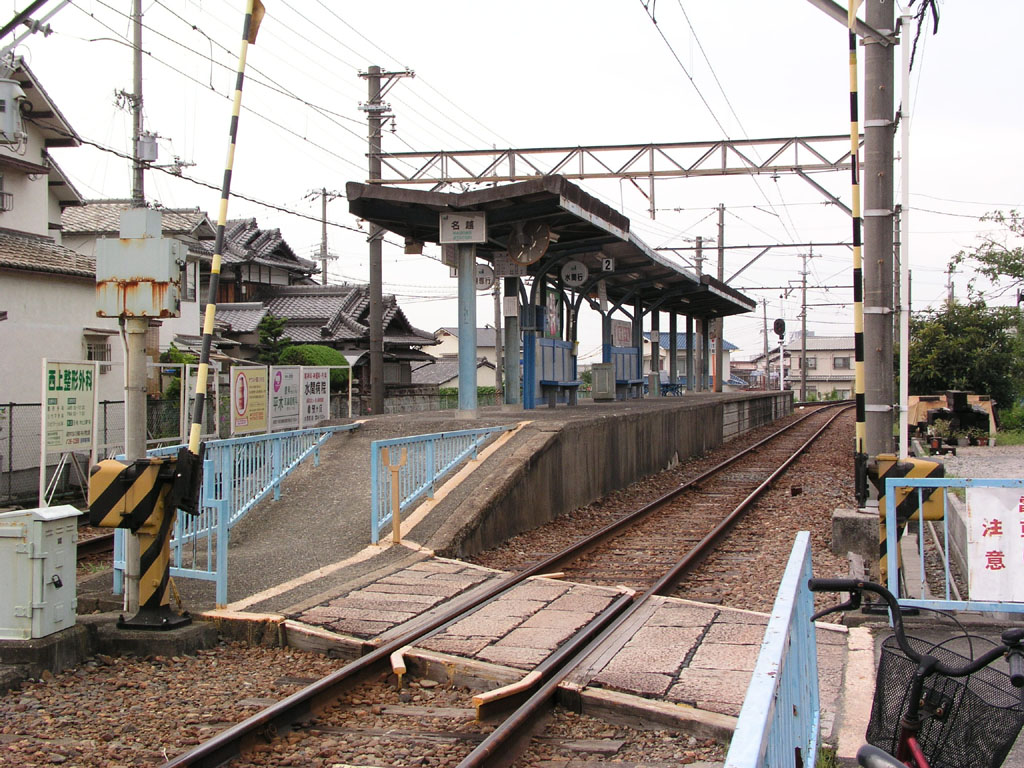
- Nagose Station, August 2006

General information
- Location: 772Nagose, Kaizuka-shi, Osaka-fu 597-0042; Japan
- Coordinates: 34°25′17″N 135°22′30″E
- Operator: Mizuma Railway
- Line: Mizuma Line
- Distance: 3.2 km (2.0 mi) from Kaizuka
- Platforms: 1 island platform
- Connections

Other information
- Status: Unstaffed

History
- Opened: December 24, 1925.

Passengers
- 2019: 423 daily
Location
- Location within Osaka Prefecture Location within Japan

Nagose Station (名越駅, Nagose-eki) is a passenger railway station located in the city of Kaizuka, Osaka Prefecture, Japan, operated by the private railway operator Mizuma Railway.

== Lines ==
Nagose Station is served by the Mizuma Line, and is 3.2 kilometers (2.0 mi) from the terminus of the line at Kaizuka.

== Layout ==
The station consists of one island platform connected to the street by a level crossing.The station is unattended.

=== Platforms ===
1	■ Mizuma Line	for Ishizai and Kaizuka
2	■ Mizuma Line	for Mizuma Kannon

== Adjacent stations ==
«	Service	»
Mizuma Railway Mizuma Line
Sechigo	-	Mori

== History ==
Nagose Station opened on December 24, 1925.

== Passenger statistics ==
In fiscal 2019, the station was used by an average of 423 passengers daily.

== Surrounding area ==
- Osaka Prefectural Road No. 40 Kishiwada Ushitakiyama Kaizuka Line
- Sengokubori Castle ruins

== See also ==
- List of railway stations in Japan
