= Koginosato Station =

Railway station in Kaizuka, Osaka Prefecture, Japan

Koginosato Station 近義の里駅
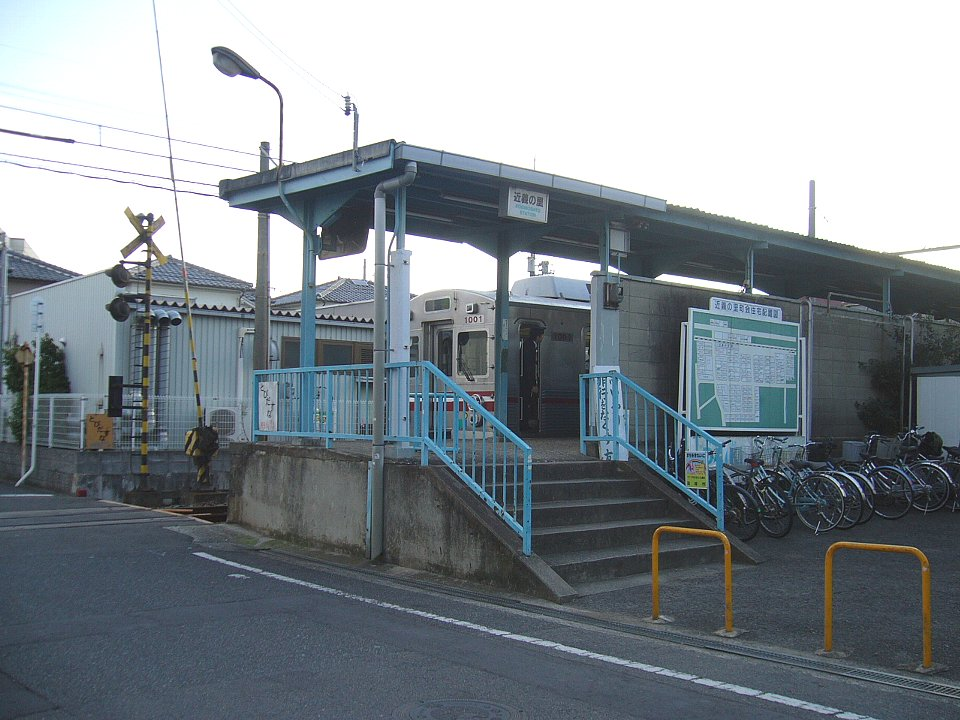
- Koginosato Station, January 2007

General information
- Location: Toba, Kaizuka-shi, Osaka-fu 597-0084; Japan
- Coordinates: 34°26′14″N 135°21′45″E
- Operator: Mizuma Railway
- Line: Mizuma Line
- Distance: 1.2 km from Kaizuka
- Platforms: 1 side platform
- Connections

Other information
- Status: Unstaffed

History
- Opened: June 10, 1969

Passengers
- 2019: 231 daily
Location
- Location within Osaka Prefecture Location within Japan

Koginosato Station (近義の里駅, Koginosato-eki) is a passenger railway station located in the city of Kaizuka, Osaka Prefecture, Japan, operated by the private railway operator Mizuma Railway.

== Lines ==
Koginosato Station is served by the Mizuma Line, and is 1.2 kilometers from the terminus of the line at Kaizuka.

== Layout ==
The station consists of one side platform serving a single bi-directional track.The station is unattended.

== Adjacent stations ==
«	Service	»
Mizuma Railway Mizuma Line
Kaizuka Shiyakushomae	-	Ishizai

== History ==
Koginosato Station opened on June 10, 1969.

== Passenger statistics ==
In fiscal 2019, the station was used by an average of 231 passengers daily.

== Surrounding area ==
- Japan National Route 26
- Osaka Prefectural Road No. 40 Kishiwada Ushitakiyama Shell Mound Line

== See also ==
- List of railway stations in Japan
