= Mori Station =

Mori Station may refer to:

- Mori Station (Hokkaidō), a railway station in Mori, Kayabe District, Hokkaidō, Japan
- Mori Station (Osaka), a railway station in Kaizuka, Osaka Prefecture, Japan
- Enshū-Mori Station, a railway station in Mori, Shuchi District, Shizuoka Prefecture, Japan
- Kawachi-Mori Station, a railway station in Katano, Osaka Prefecture, Japan
- Bungo-Mori Station, a railway station in Kusu, Kusu District, Oita Prefecture, Japan
