= Kaizuka Station =

Kaizuka Station is the name of two train stations in Japan:

- Kaizuka Station (Fukuoka)
- Kaizuka Station (Osaka)
