= Sechigo Station =

Railway station in Kaizuka, Osaka Prefecture, Japan

Sechigo Station 清児駅
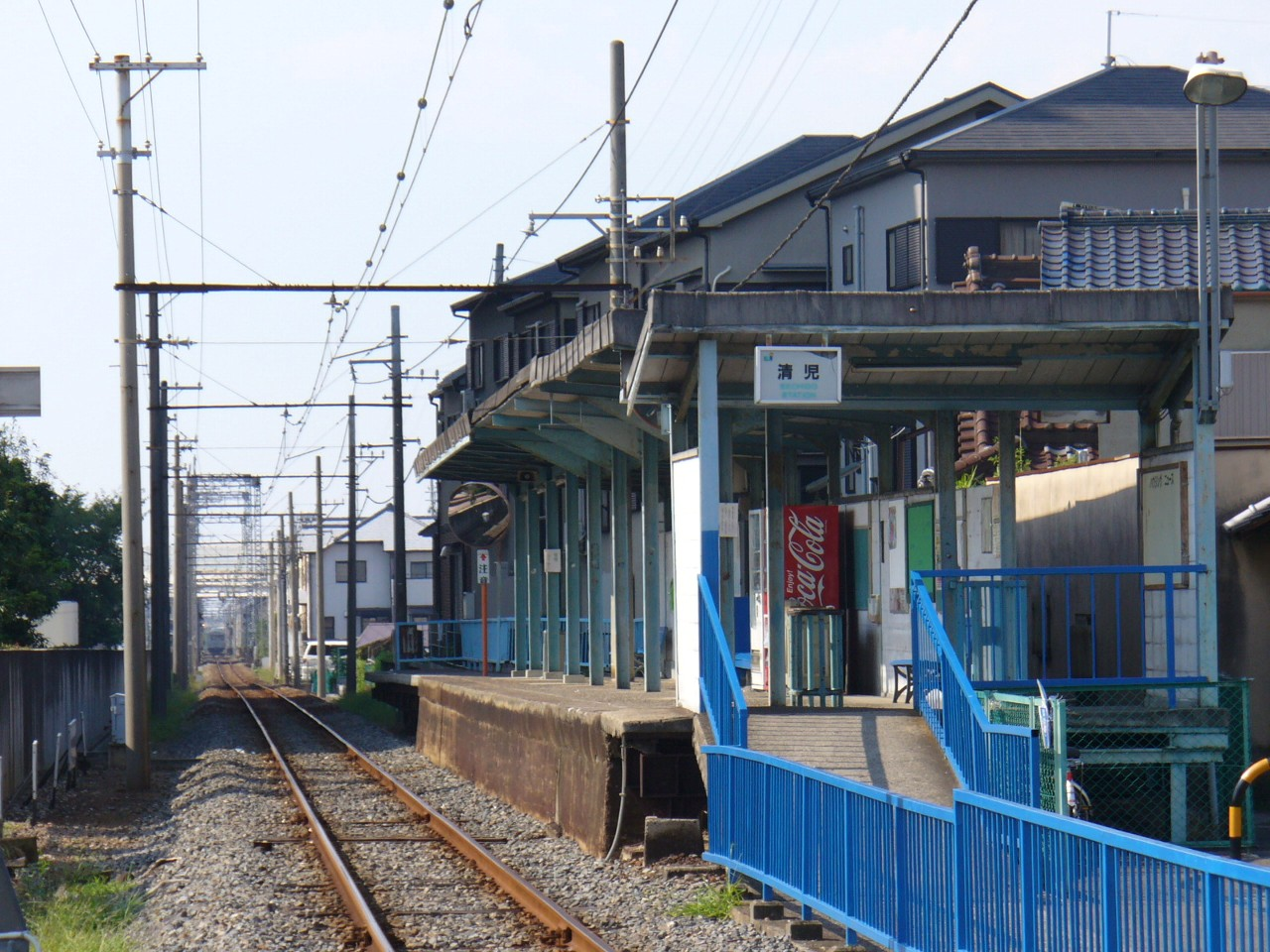
- Sechigo Station, August 2006

General information
- Location: Sechigo, Kaizuka-shi, Osaka-fu 597-0041; Japan
- Coordinates: 34°25′30″N 135°22′20″E
- Operator: Mizuma Railway
- Line: Mizuma Line
- Distance: 2.8 km from Kaizuka
- Platforms: 1 side platform
- Connections

Other information
- Status: Unstaffed

History
- Opened: December 24, 1925.

Passengers
- 2019: 1252 daily
Location
- Location within Osaka Prefecture Location within Japan

Sechigo Station (清児駅, Sechigo-eki) is a passenger railway station located in the city of Kaizuka, Osaka Prefecture, Japan, operated by the private railway operator Mizuma Railway.

== Lines ==
Sechigo Station is served by the Mizuma Line, and is 2.8 kilometers from the terminus of the line at Kaizuka.

== Layout ==
The station consists of one side platform serving a single bi-directional track. The station is unattended.

== Adjacent stations ==
«	Service	»
Mizuma Railway Mizuma Line
Ishizai	-	Nagose

== History ==
Sechigo Station opened on December 24, 1925.

== Passenger statistics ==
In fiscal 2019, the station was used by an average of 1252 passengers daily.

== Surrounding area ==
The area around the station is lined with historical houses. The surrounding roads are very narrow, especially near the entrance and exit of the station, which is too narrow for cars to pass.

== See also ==
- List of railway stations in Japan
