= Mikayamaguchi Station =

Railway station in Kaizuka, Osaka Prefecture, Japan

Mikayamaguchi Station 三ヶ山口駅
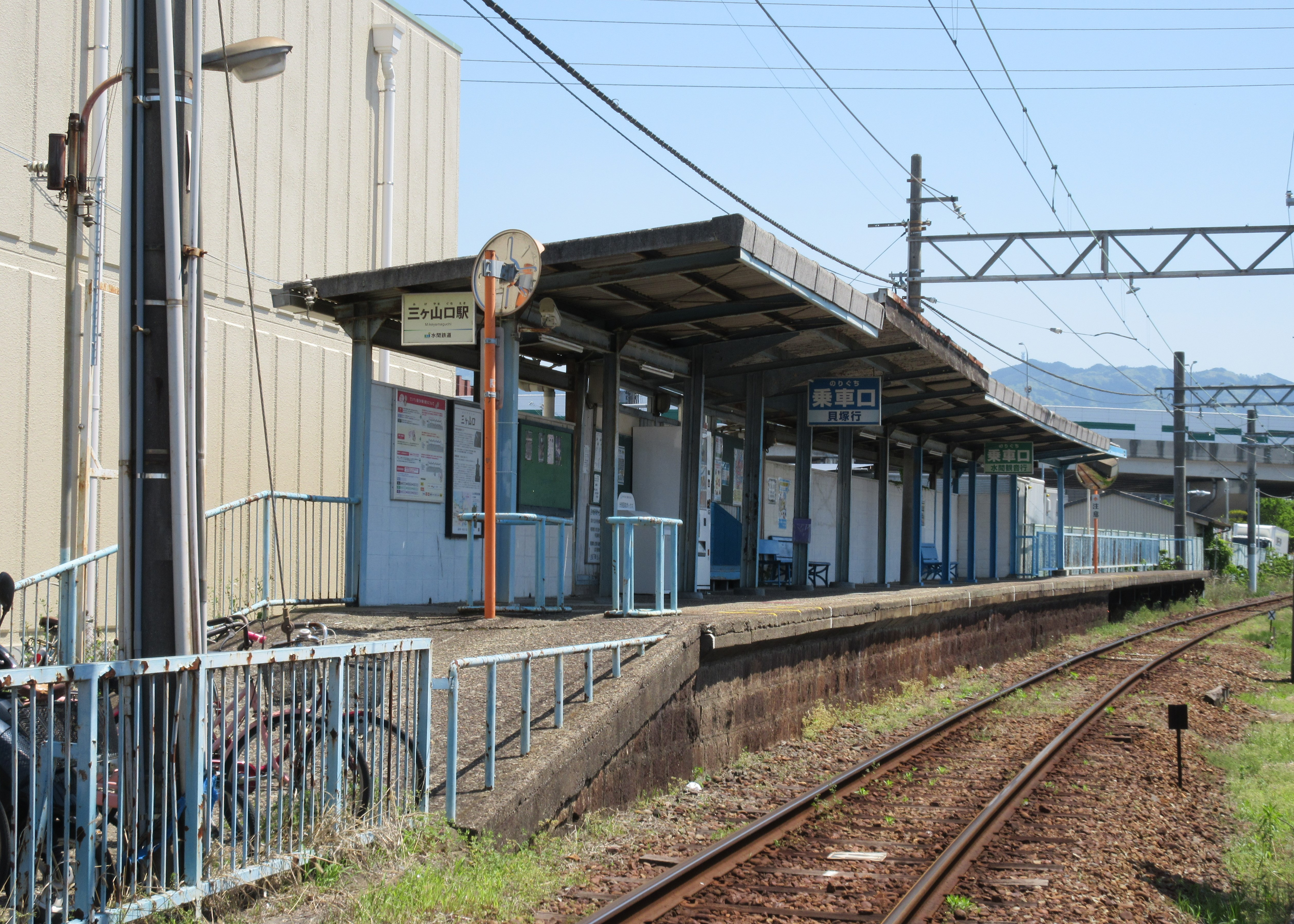
- Mikayamaguchi Station, May 2019

General information
- Location: 691 Mitsumatsu, Kaizuka-shi, Osaka-fu 597-0082; Japan
- Coordinates: 34°24′26″N 135°23′06″E
- Operator: Mizuma Railway
- Line: Mizuma Line
- Distance: 5.1 km from Kaizuka
- Platforms: 1 side platform
- Connections

Other information
- Status: Unstaffed

History
- Opened: November 23, 1960

Passengers
- 2019: 304 daily
Location
- Location within Osaka Prefecture Location within Japan

Mikayamaguchi Station (三ヶ山口駅, Mikayamaguchi-eki) is a passenger railway station located in the city of Kaizuka, Osaka Prefecture, Japan, operated by the private railway operator Mizuma Railway.

== Lines ==
Mikayamaguchi Station is served by the Mizuma Line, and is 5.1 kilometers from the terminus of the line at Kaizuka.

== Layout ==
The station consists of one side platform serving a single bi-directional track. The station is unattended.

== Adjacent stations ==
«	Service	»
Mizuma Railway Mizuma Line
Mitsumatsu	-	Mizuma Kannon

== History ==
Mikayamaguchi Station opened on November 23, 1960.

== Passenger statistics ==
In fiscal 2019, the station was used by an average of 304 passengers daily.

== Surrounding area ==
- Kaizuka City Zenbei Land (Astronomical Museum)
- Kaizuka City Higashiyama Elementary School (closest to Mitsumatsu Station next door)
- Kaizuka City Eiju Elementary School
- Kaizuka Municipal Third Junior High School
- Osaka Kawasaki Rehabilitation University Ground

== See also ==
- List of railway stations in Japan
