= Mitsumatsu Station =

Mitsumatsu Station may refer to:

- Mitsumatsu Station (Fukui), a railway station in Fukui Prefecture, Japan
- Mitsumatsu Station (Osaka), a railway station in Osaka Prefecture, Japan
