= Kaizuka Shiyakushomae Station =

Railway station in Kaizuka, Osaka Prefecture, Japan

Kaizuka Shiyakushomae Station 貝塚市役所前駅
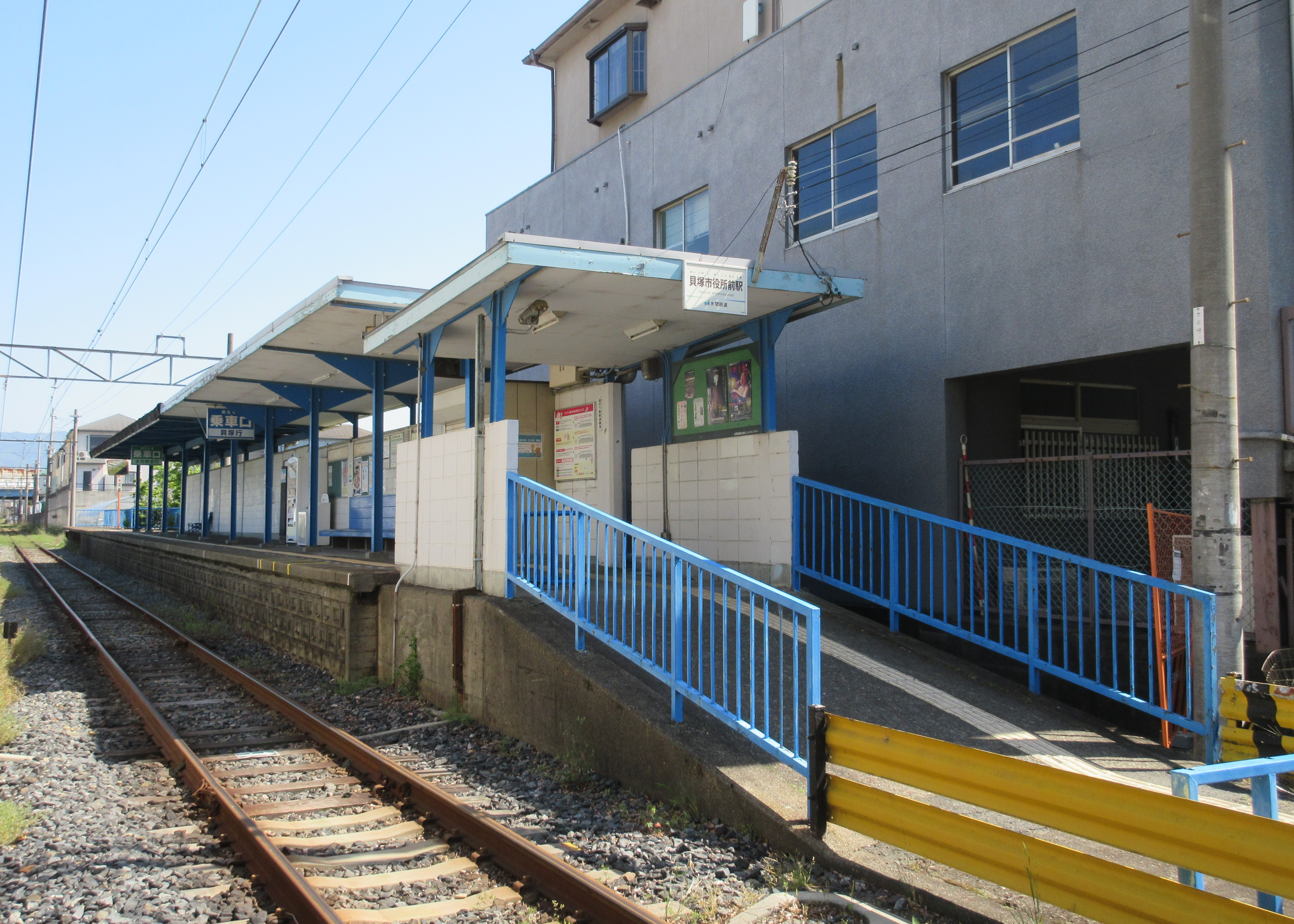
- Kaizuka Shiyakushomae Station, May 2019

General information
- Location: Hatakenaka, Kaizuka-shi, Osaka-fu 597-0072; Japan
- Coordinates: 34°26′22″N 135°21′38″E
- Operator: Mizuma Railway
- Line: Mizuma Line
- Platforms: 1 side platform
- Connections

Other information
- Status: Unstaffed

History
- Opened: July 10, 1967

Passengers
- 2019: 231 daily
Location
- Location within Osaka Prefecture Location within Japan

Kaizuka Shiyakushomae Station (貝塚市役所前駅, Kaizuka Shiyakushomae-eki) is a passenger railway station located in the city of Kaizuka, Osaka Prefecture, Japan, operated by the private railway operator Mizuma Railway.

== Lines ==
Kaizuka Shiyakushomae Station is served by the Mizuma Line, and is 0.8 kilometers from the terminus of the line at Kaizuka.

== Layout ==
The station consists of one side platform serving a single bi-directional track.The station is unattended.

== Adjacent stations ==
«	Service	»
Mizuma Railway Mizuma Line
Kaizuka	-	Koginosato

== History ==
Kaizuka Shiyakushomae Station opened on July 10, 1967.

== Passenger statistics ==
In fiscal 2019, the station was used by an average of 231 passengers daily.

== Surrounding area ==
- Kaizuka City Hall
- Kaizuka City Gymnasium
- Kaizuka Citizens Welfare Center
- Osaka Prefectural Kaizuka High School

== See also ==
- List of railway stations in Japan
