= Ishizai Station =

Railway station in Kaizuka, Osaka Prefecture, Japan

Ishizai Station 石才駅
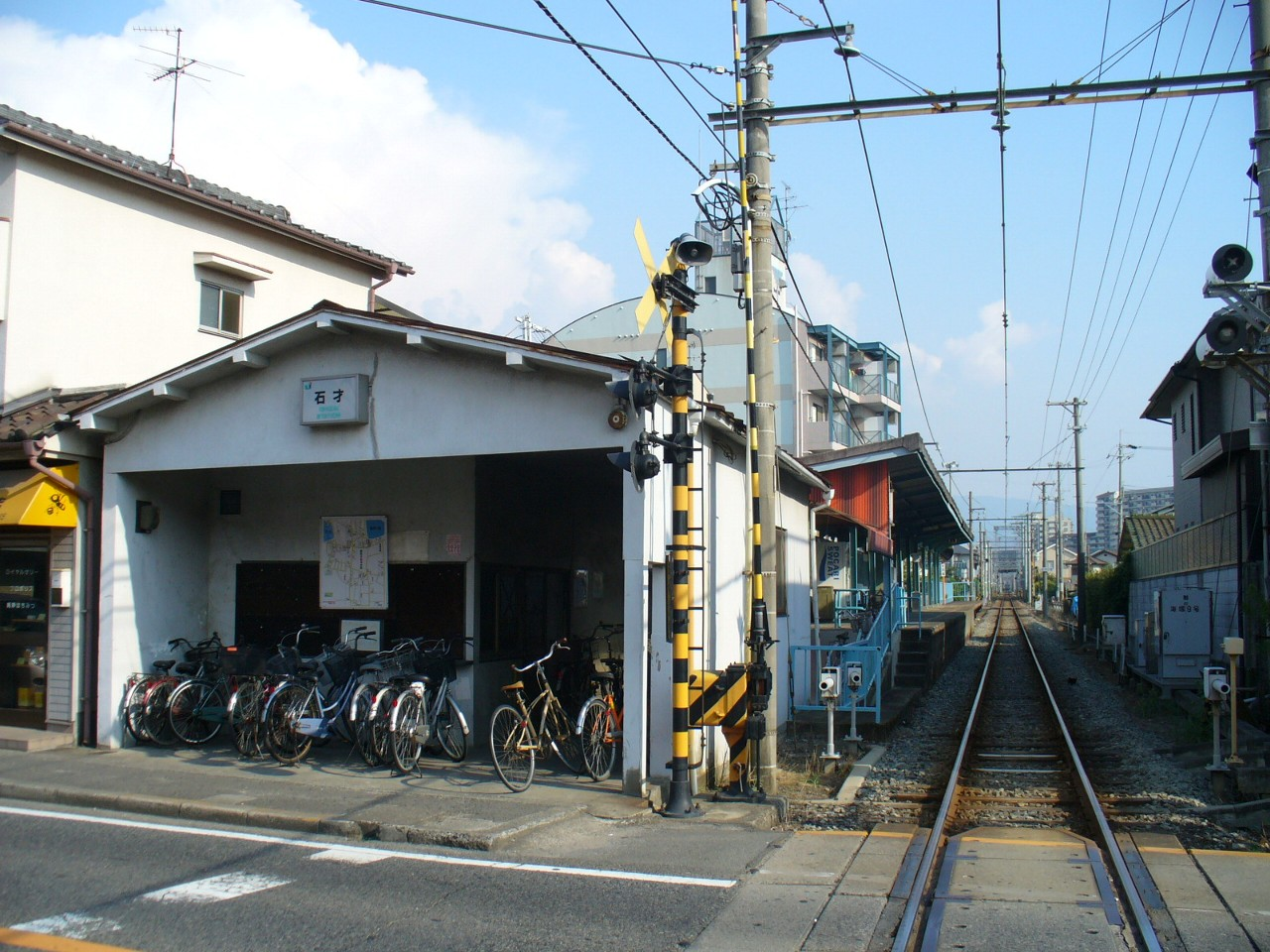
- Ishizai Station, August 2006

General information
- Location: Ishizai, Kaizuka-shi, Osaka-fu 597-0082; Japan
- Coordinates: 34°25′51″N 135°22′05″E
- Operator: Mizuma Railway
- Line: Mizuma Line
- Distance: 2.0 km from Kaizuka
- Platforms: 1 side platform
- Connections

Other information
- Status: Unstaffed

History
- Opened: December 24, 1925.

Passengers
- 2019: 432 daily
Location
- Location within Osaka Prefecture Location within Japan

Ishizai Station (石才駅, Ishizai-eki) is a passenger railway station located in the city of Kaizuka, Osaka Prefecture, Japan, operated by the private railway operator Mizuma Railway.

== Lines ==
Ishizai Station is served by the Mizuma Line, and is 2.0 kilometers from the terminus of the line at Kaizuka.

== Layout ==
The station consists of one side platform serving a single bi-directional track.The station is unattended.

== Adjacent stations ==
«	Service	»
Mizuma Railway Mizuma Line
Koginosato	-	Sechigo

== History ==
Ishizai Station opened on December 24, 1925.

== Passenger statistics ==
In fiscal 2019, the station was used by an average of 432 passengers daily.

== Surrounding area ==
- Osaka Prefectural Road No. 30 Osaka Izumi Sennan Line
- Osaka Prefectural Road No. 40 Kishiwada Ushitakiyama Shell Mound Line
- Kansai Driving School

== See also ==
- List of railway stations in Japan
