= Kaizuka, Osaka =

Kaizuka 貝塚市
- City
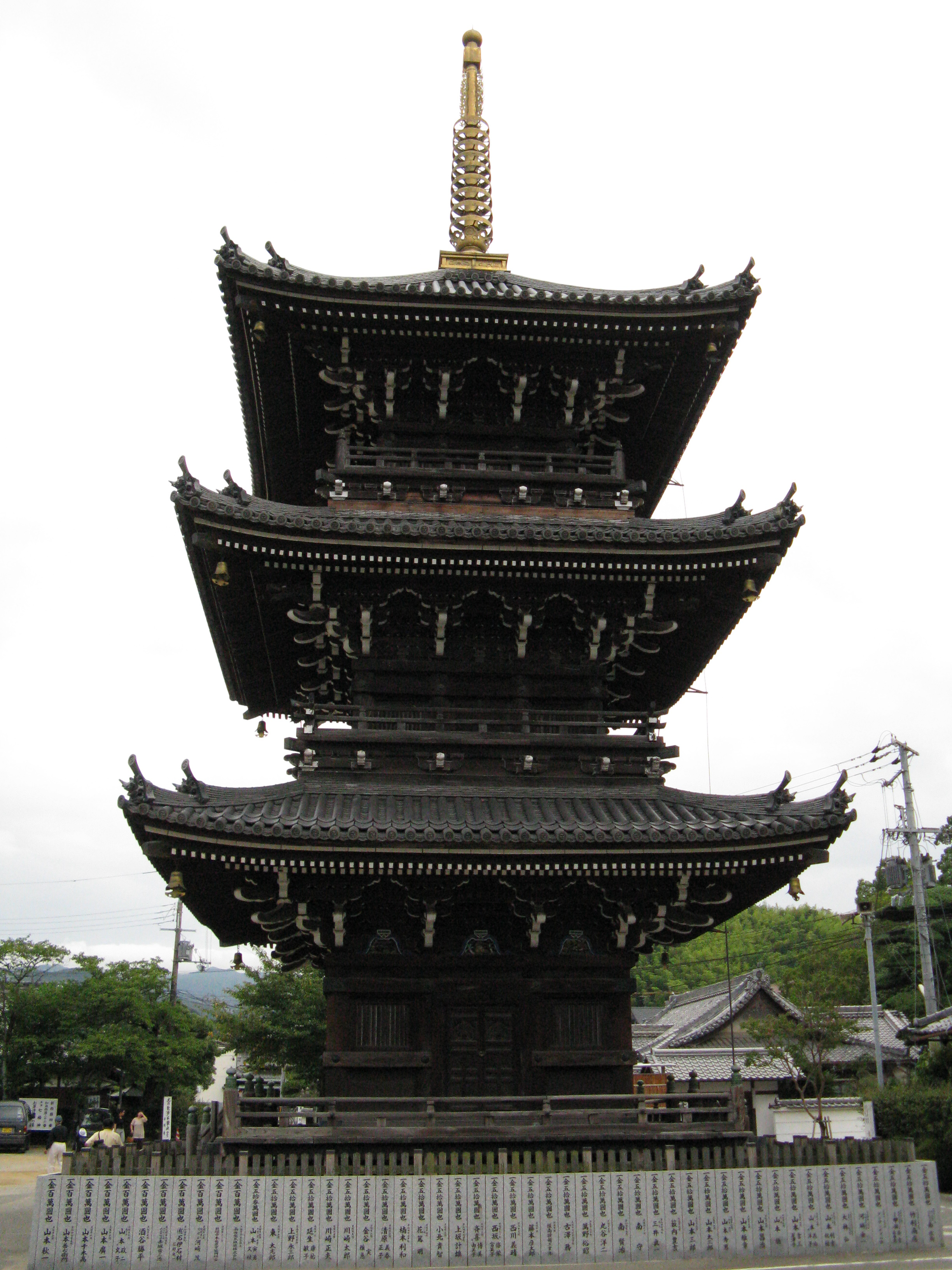
- Mizuma Temple in Kaizuka

- Flag Emblem

- Location of Kaizuka in Osaka Prefecture

- Location in Japan
- Coordinates: 34°26′N 135°22′E
- Country: Japan
- Region: Kansai
- Prefecture: Osaka

Government
  - Mayor: Tatsuo Fujiwara

Area
  - Total: 43.93 km^{2} (16.96 sq mi)

Population (January 1, 2022)
  - Total: 83,995
  - Density: 1,912/km^{2} (4,952/sq mi)
- Time zone: UTC+09:00 (JST)
- City hall address: 1-17-1 Hatakenaka, Kaizuka-shi, Osaka-fu 597-8585
- Website: Official website
- Symbols
- Flower: Cosmos
- Tree: Kaizukaibuki (Juniperus chinensis 'Kaizuka')

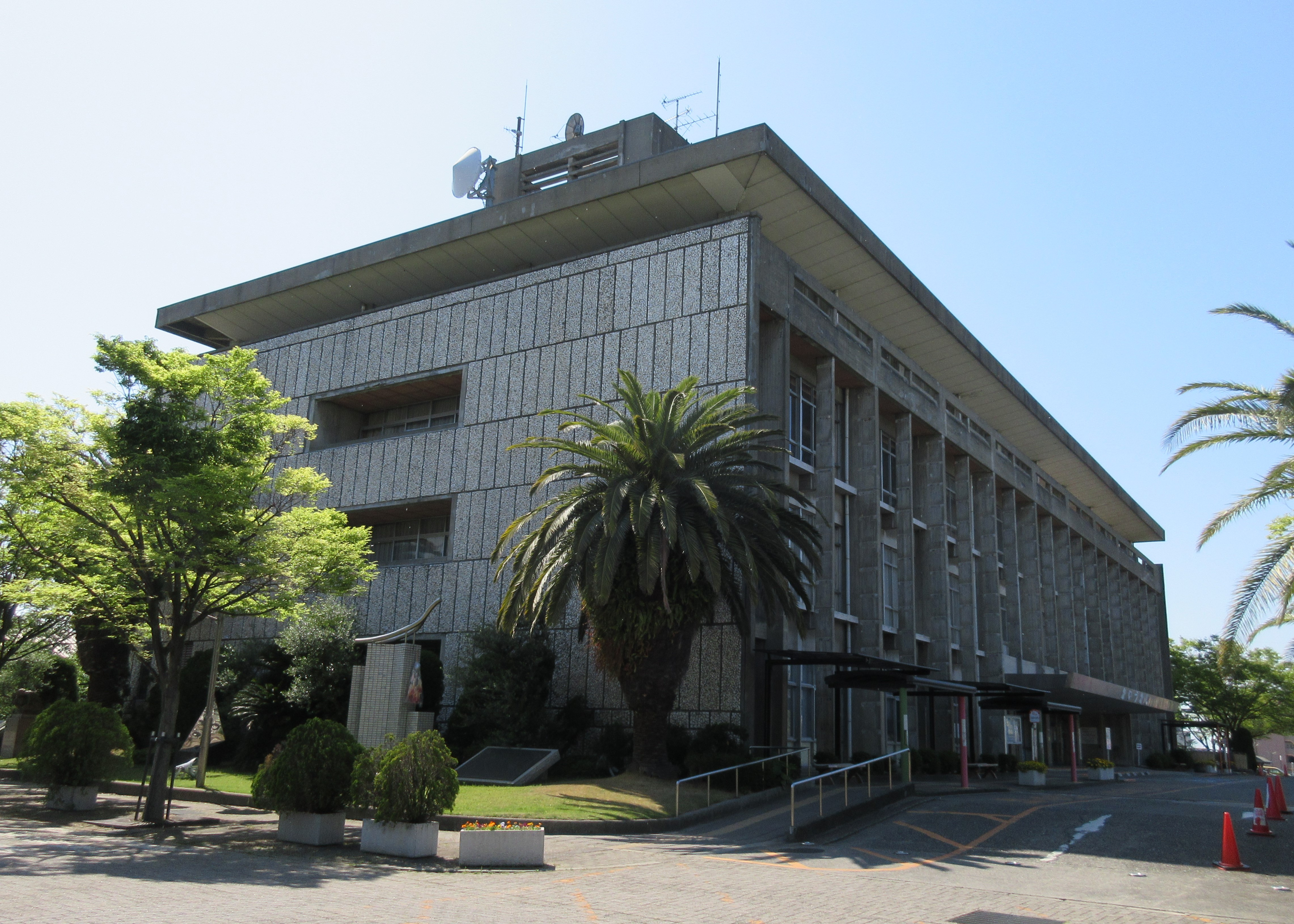
Kaizuka CIty Hall

Kaizuka (貝塚市, Kaizuka-shi) is a city located in Osaka Prefecture, Japan. As of 1 January 2022, the city had an estimated population of 83,995 in 37,778 households and a population density of 1900 persons per km^{2}. The total area of the city is 43.93 square kilometres (16.96 sq mi).

== Geography ==
Kaizuka is located in the southern part of Izumi Region in Osaka Prefecture, bordered by Osaka Bay to the northwest. The Kogi River flows from east to west, the Tsuda River forms the line between this city and Kishiwada City, and the Mide River is a city boundary with Izumisano City. Nankai Main Line and Hanwa Line run from south to north, and the Mizuma Railway runs from east to west. Mount Izumi Katsuragi is partly in Kaizuka territory.

=== Neighboring municipalities ===
Osaka Prefecture

- Izumisano
- Kishiwada
- Kumatori

Wakayama Prefecture

- Kinokawa

== Climate ==
Kaizuka has a humid subtropical climate (Köppen Cfa) characterized by warm summers and cool winters with light to no snowfall. The average annual temperature in Kaizuka is 14.6 °C. The average annual rainfall is 1475 mm with September as the wettest month. The temperatures are highest on average in August, at around 26.6 °C, and lowest in January, at around 3.3 °C.

== Demographics ==
Per Japanese census data, the population of Kaizuka has increased steadily over the last century..

Historical population
Year	Pop.	±%
1920	24,678	—
1930	31,320	+26.9%
1940	42,797	+36.6%
1950	53,586	+25.2%
1960	61,067	+14.0%
1970	73,366	+20.1%
1980	81,162	+10.6%
1990	79,234	−2.4%
2000	88,523	+11.7%
2010	90,531	+2.3%

== History ==
The area of the modern city of Izumisano was within ancient Izumi Province. The area was a stronghold of Ishiyama Hongan-ji during the Sengoku period. In the Edo Period, much of the city area was controlled by the Osaka machi-bugyō and by Kishiwada Domain. After the Meiji restoration, the town of Kaizuka established within Minami District with the creation of the modern municipalities system on April 1, 1889, along with the villages of Asogou, Shima, Kijima and Nishi-Katsuragi. Kita-Kogi and Minami-Kogi (within Hine District) were also formed. On April 1, 1896 the area became part of Sennan District, Osaka. Kaizuka annexed Asogou, Shima, Kita-Kogi, and Minami-Kogi on April 1, 1931, Kijima on April 15, 1935 and Nishi-Katsuragi on April 1, 1939. Kaizuka was elevated to city status on October 1, 1943.

== Government ==
Kaizuka has a mayor-council form of government with a directly elected mayor and a unicameral city council of 18 members. Kaizuka contributes one member to the Osaka Prefectural Assembly. In terms of national politics, the city is part of Osaka 19th district of the lower house of the Diet of Japan.

== Economy ==
Kaizuka has been famous for its production of wooden combs since ancient times. Made of boxwood, this remains an important handicraft and is the motif of the city's mascot character. The city economy is a mixture of industrial (textiles, steel wire and rope) and agriculture (onions, eggplant). Many residents commute to larger cities to the north, including Sakai and Osaka. Taking advantage of the city's proximity to Kansai International Airport, the Nishikinohama Industrial Park was constructed by reclaiming the offshore area of on the right bank of the mouth of the Kogi River.

== Education ==
Kaizuka has 11 public elementary schools and five public middle schools operated by the city government and three public high schools operated by the Osaka Prefectural Department of Education. There is also one private high school. The Osaka Kawasaki Rehabilitation University is also located in Kaizuka.

== Transportation ==
=== Airport ===
- Kansai International Airport

=== Railway ===
JR West – Hanwa Line

- Higashi-Kaizuka - Izumi-Hashimoto

Nankai Electric Railway - Nankai Main Line

- Kaizuka - Nishikinohama

Mizuma Railway - Mizuma Line

- Kaizuka - Kaizuka Shiyakushomae - Koginosato - Ishizai - Sechigo - Nagose - Mori - Mitsumatsu - Mikayamaguchi - Mizuma Kannon

=== Highway ===
- Hanshin Expressway
- Hanwa Expressway
- Kansai-Kūkō Expressway
- National Route 26
- National Route 170

== Local attractions ==
- Gansen-ji
- Kōon-ji
- Kumano Kodō
- Mizuma-dera
- Nishikinohama Beach
- Okumizuma Onsen

=== Sports ===
The city is promoting volleyball because it used to be the home of Nichibo Women's Volleyball Team called Oriental Witches led by Hirofumi Daimatsu.

== Sister cities ==
- Culver City, California, United States, since 1965
- Saint Helier, Jersey

== Notable people from Kaizuka ==
- Aya Hisakawa, voice actress, singer
- Emma Haruka Iwao, computer scientist
- Atsushi Kotoge, professional wrestler
