= Nishikinohama Station =

Railway station in Kaizuka, Osaka Prefecture, Japan

Nishikinohama Station 二色浜駅
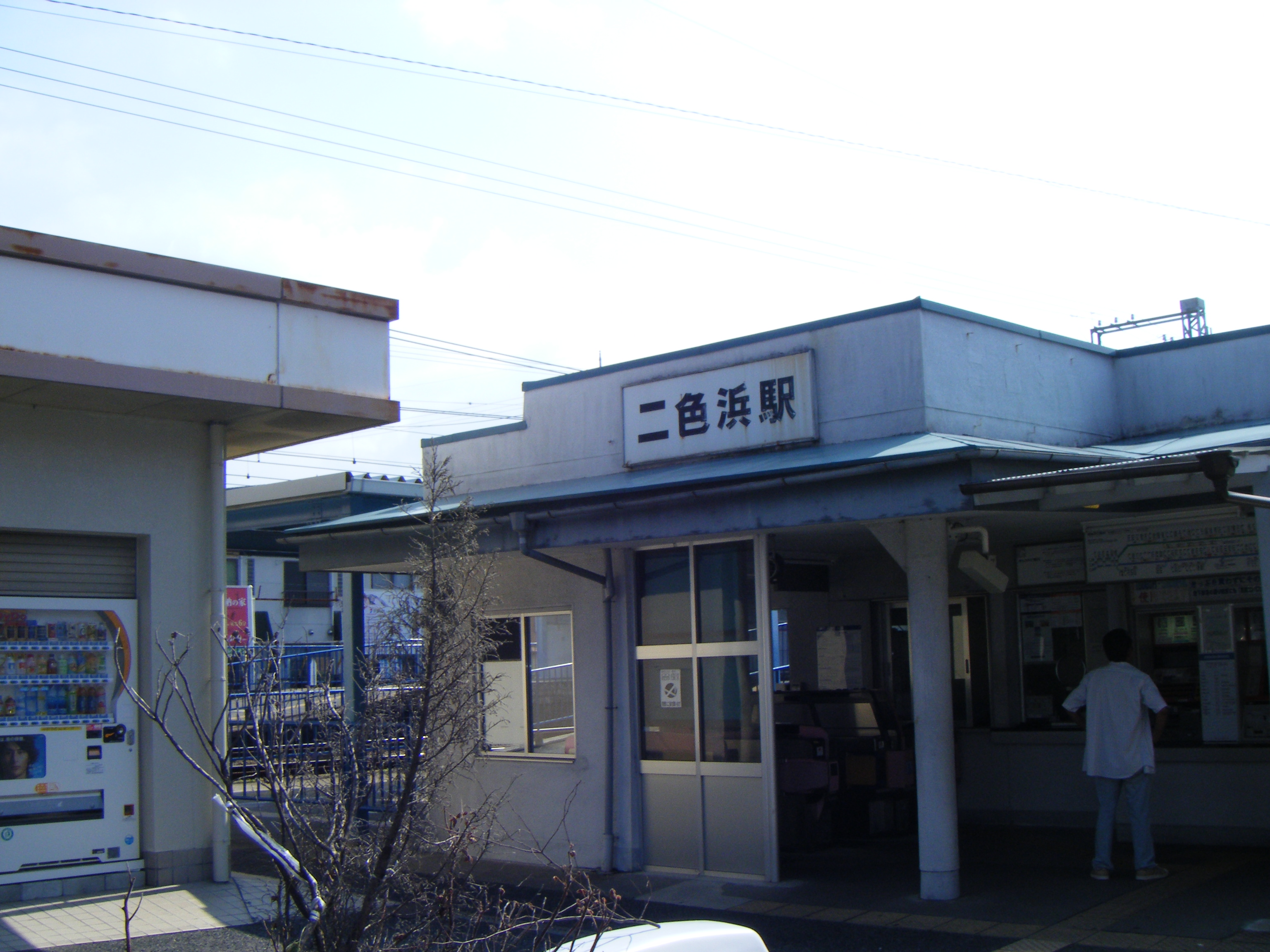
- Nishikinohama Station entrance in September 2008

General information
- Location: 647-2, Sawa, Kaizuka-shi, Osaka-fu 597-0062; Japan
- Coordinates: 34°25′58″N 135°20′43″E
- Operator: Nankai Electric Railway
- Line: Nankai Main Line
- Distance: 30.4 km from Namba
- Platforms: 2 side platforms

Other information
- Station code: NK27
- Website: Official website

History
- Opened: June 1936; 90 years ago (limited operation); 1 October 1938; 87 years ago (full operation)

Passengers
- 2019: 4489 daily
Location
- Location within Osaka Prefecture Location within Japan

Nishikinohama Station (二色浜駅, Nishikinohama-eki) is a passenger railway station located in the city of Kaizuka, Osaka Prefecture, Japan, operated by the private railway operator Nankai Electric Railway. It has the station number "NK27".

== Lines ==
Nishikinohama Station is served by the Nankai Main Line, and is 30.4 kilometers (18.9 mi) from the terminus of the line at Nanba.

== Layout ==
The station consists of two opposed side platforms connected by a level crossing. The station is unattended.

=== Platforms ===
1	■ Nankai Main Line	for Wakayamashi and Kansai Airport
2	■ Nankai Main Line	for Namba

== Adjacent stations ==
«	Service	»
Nankai Main Line
Limited Express "rapi:t α" for Kansai Airport (特急ラピートα): Does not stop at this station
Limited Express "rapi:t β" (特急ラピートβ): Does not stop at this station
Limited Express "Southern" (特急サザン): Does not stop at this station
Limited Express without seat reservations (自由席特急): Does not stop at this station
Express (急行): Does not stop at this station
Airport Express (空港急行): Does not stop at this station
Sub. Express (区間急行): Does not stop at this station
Kaizuka	Semi-Express for Namba (準急, in the morning on weekdays)	Tsuruhara
Kaizuka	Local (普通車)	Tsuruhara

== History ==
Nishikinohama Station opened on 1 October 1938.

== Passenger statistics ==
In fiscal 2019, the station was used by an average of 4489 passengers daily.

== Surrounding area ==
- Nishikinohama Beach

== See also ==
- List of railway stations in Japan
