= Kōon-ji (Kaizuka) =

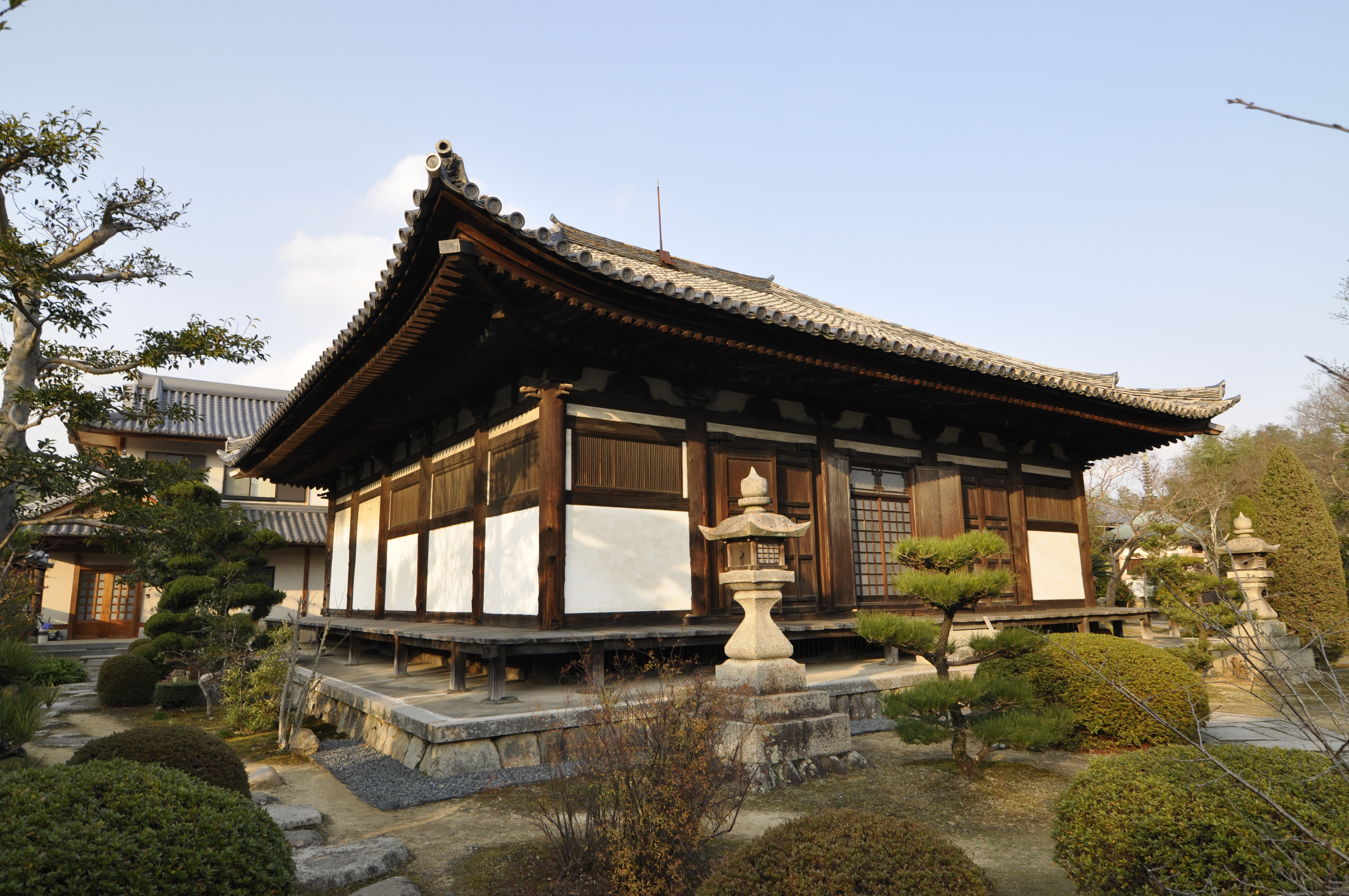
The Kannon Hall of Kōon-ji, a National Treasure of Japan

Kōon-ji (孝恩寺) is a Jōdo-shū Buddhist temple in Kaizuka, Osaka, Japan.

== History ==
The original origins of the temple are not known. It was rebuilt in 1684. When Kannon-ji Temple (観音寺) was abandoned in 1914, Koōn-ji reclaimed its building in Kannon's honor. Kannon-ji had been built at the request of Emperor Shōmu in the year 726 under the supervision of Gyōki and, according to tradition, Gyōki also handcrafted the Kannon statue installed there.

When Toyotomi Hideyoshi conquered Kii Province, the temple was destroyed except for the building in honor of Kannon. During the Edo period, the lords of Kishiwada, the Okabe clan, took care of the temple. However, it was abandoned in 1889. Later, medieval bricks, floor tiles, pottery and other objects were unearthed on its site.

== Description ==
The Kanon-dō measures 5 × 5 ken. It forms an exact square of 12.72 × 12.72. The roof is tiled. The room dates from the Kamakura period and is listed as a national treasure. As no nails were used in its construction, the building is called the Nailless Room (釘無堂, kuginashi-dô).

== Treasures ==
Inside the hall, many Buddhist figures are worshipped. The main figure of the cult is a seated wooden Amida Nyorai. Next, starting with an eleven-headed Kannon. There are a total of 19 statues which are all registered as Important Cultural Properties of Japan. They date from the second half of the Heian period. There is also a wooden board painting of saints from the Heian period, also listed as an important cultural property.

On the temple site are a five-story stone pagoda (an important cultural property of the prefecture) dating from 1348, as well as pagodas and stone steles from the Tenshō period (1573–1593).
