= Mizuma Railway Mizuma Line =

Railway line in Ōsaka, Japan

Mizuma Line

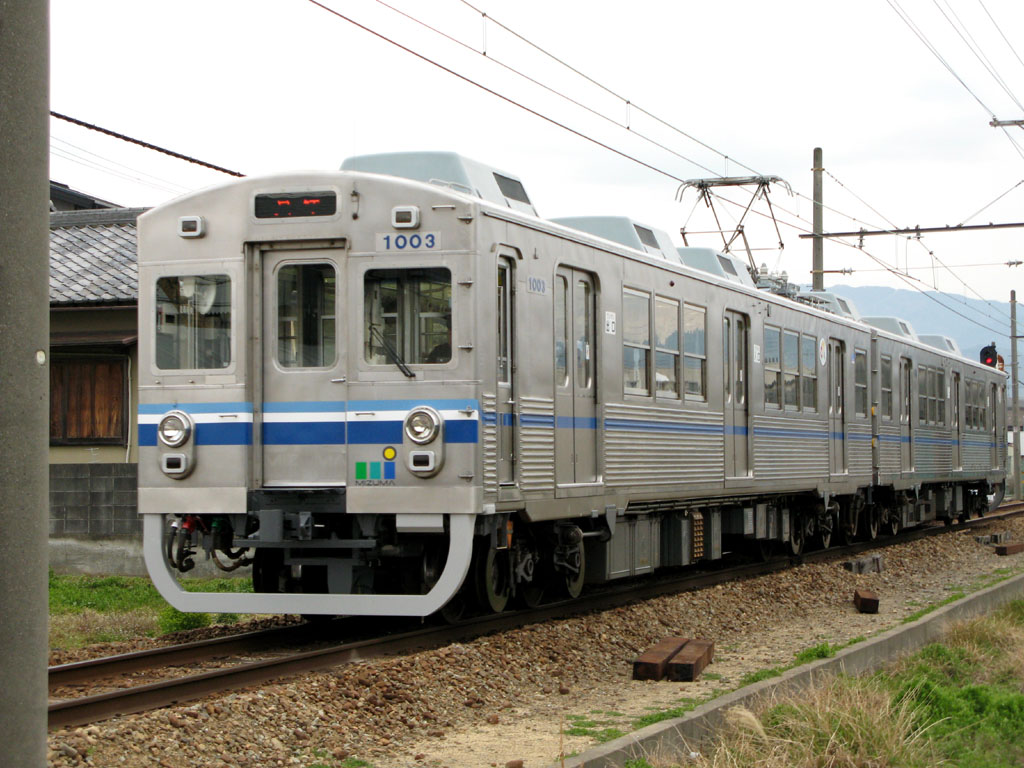
- 1000 Series

Overview
- Native name: 水間線
- Locale: Kaizuka, Osaka Prefecture
- Termini: Kaizuka; Mizuma Kannon
- Stations: 10

Service
- Operator(s): Mizuma Railway Co., Ltd.

History
- Opened: 24 December 1925; 100 years ago

Technical
- Line length: 5.5 km (3.4 mi)
- Number of tracks: Single
- Track gauge: 1,067 mm (3 ft 6 in)
- Electrification: 1,500 V DC, overhead lines
- Operating speed: 60 km/h (37 mph)
Route map
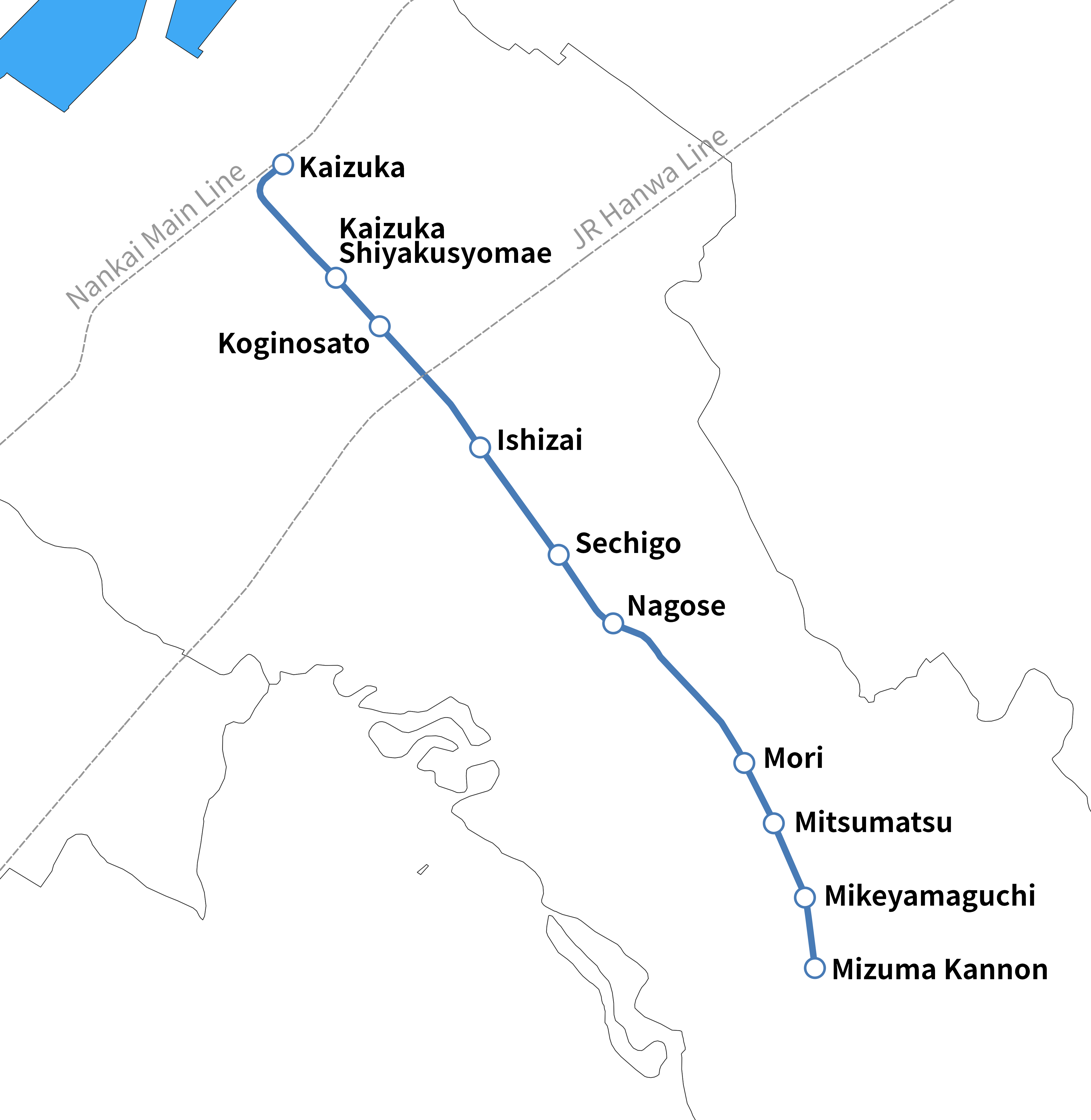

The Mizuma Line (水間線, Mizuma-sen) is a Japanese railway line between Mizuma Kannon Station and Kaizuka Station, all within Kaizuka, Ōsaka. This is the only railway line of the private railway company Mizuma Railway (水間鉄道, Mizuma Tetsudō), which also operates bus services.

The company or the line is commonly called Suitetsu (水鉄).

== Basic data ==
- Distance: 5.5 kilometres (3.4 miles)
- Gauge: 1,067 mm (3 ft 6 in)
- Stations: 10
- Track: single
- Electric supply: 1,500 V DC
- Railway signalling: Automatic

== History ==
The line opened between December 1925 and January 1926, electrified at 600 VDC.

Freight services ceased in 1972. In 1990 the line voltage was increased to 1,500 VDC in conjunction with the introduction of ex-Tokyu 7000 series EMUs which operated at 1,500 VDC.

=== Proposed connecting line ===
- Sechigo station - Construction of a proposed line to Kokawa on the Wakayama Line commenced in the late 1920s but was abandoned due to the economic depression in the 1930s

== Services ==
All services on the Line are Local trains, stopping at every station.

On weekdays, trains operate approximately every 20 minutes during morning and evening peak hours and every 30 minutes at other times. On weekends and holidays, trains operate approximately every 20 minutes between 07:00 and 09:00 and every 30 minutes at other times. Running time is 15-17 minutes.

== Stations ==
All stations are in Kaizuka, Osaka Prefecture.

Station	Japanese	Distance (km)		Transfers
Station	Japanese	Between Stations	Total Distance	Transfers
Kaizuka	貝塚	-	0.0	Nankai Main Line (NK26)
Kaizuka Shiyakushomae	貝塚市役所前	0.8	0.8	
Koginosato	近義の里	0.4	1.2	
Ishizai	石才	0.8	2.0	
Sechigo	清児	0.8	2.8	
Nagose	名越	0.4	3.2	
Mori	森	1.1	4.3	
Mitsumatsu	三ツ松	0.4	4.7	
Mikayamaguchi	三ヶ山口	0.4	5.1	
Mizuma Kannon	水間観音	0.4	5.5	

== Rolling Stock ==
1000 series ^{[ja]} 2-car EMU trainsets x 4 (8 cars) (former Tokyu 7000 series ^{[ja]} built 1962-1966). 10 cars were acquired from Tokyu in 1990. 8 of the 10 cars were refurbished in 2006-2007 and renumbered from 7000 series to 1000 series, while the remaining 2 cars were withdrawn from regular service.

== See also ==
- List of railway companies in Japan
- List of railway lines in Japan
