= Mitsumatsu Station (Osaka) =

Railway station in Kaizuka, Osaka Prefecture, Japan

Mitsumatsu Station 三ツ松駅
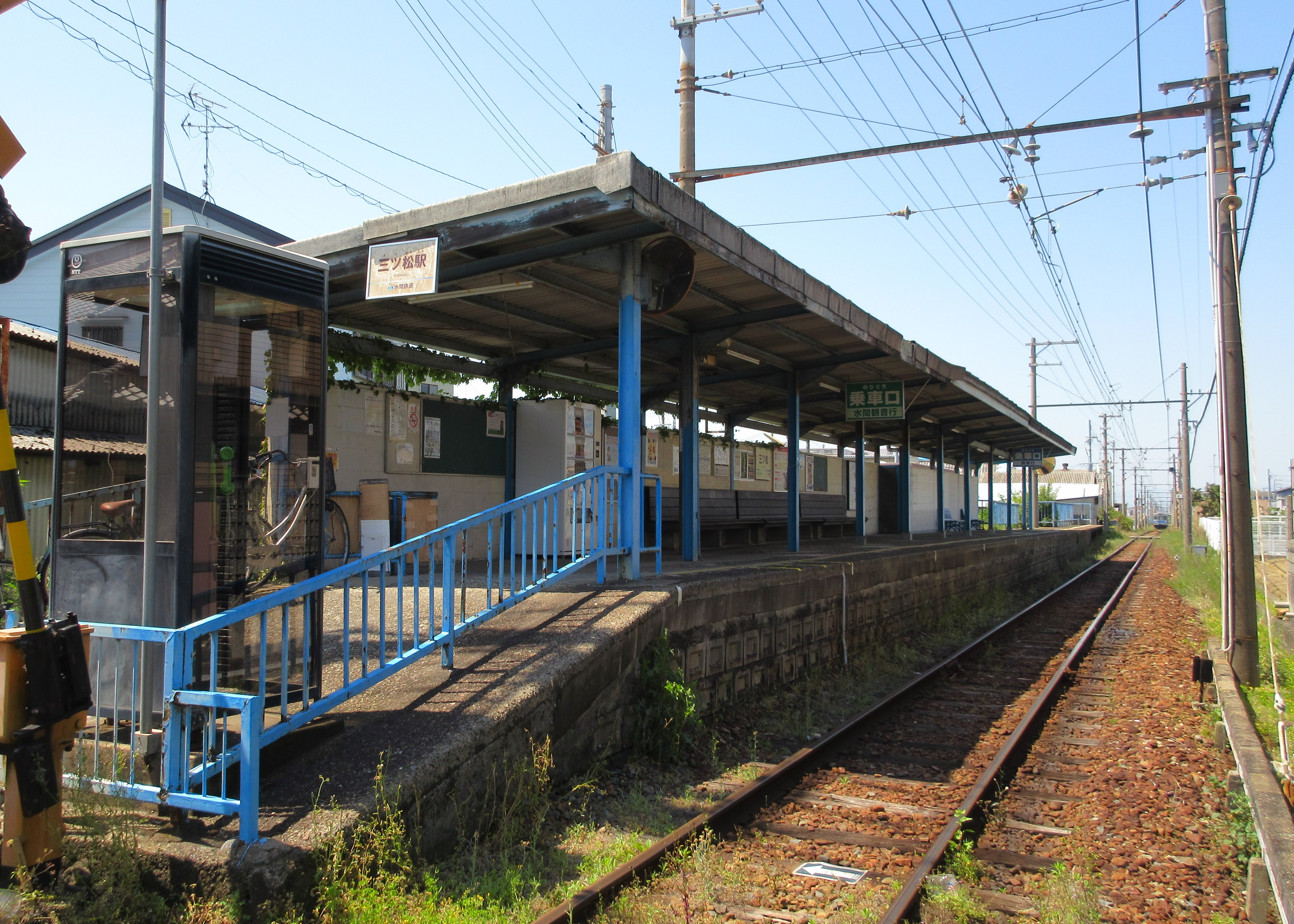
- Mitsumatsu Station, May 2019

General information
- Location: 879-3 Mitsumatsu, Kaizuka-shi, Osaka-fu 597-0105; Japan
- Coordinates: 34°24′39″N 135°23′00″E
- Operator: Mizuma Railway
- Line: Mizuma Line
- Distance: 4.7 km from Kaizuka
- Platforms: 1 side platform
- Connections

Other information
- Status: Unstaffed

History
- Opened: January 30, 1926

Passengers
- 2019: 418 daily
Location
- Location within Osaka Prefecture Location within Japan

Mitsumatsu Station (三ツ松駅, Mitsumatsu-eki) is a passenger railway station located in the city of Kaizuka, Osaka Prefecture, Japan, operated by the private railway operator Mizuma Railway.

== Lines ==
Mitsumatsu Station is served by the Mizuma Line, and is 4.7 kilometers from the terminus of the line at Kaizuka.

== Layout ==
The station consists of one side platform serving a single bi-directional track. The station is unattended.

== Adjacent stations ==
«	Service	»
Mizuma Railway Mizuma Line
Mori	-	Mikayamaguchi

== History ==
Mitsumatsu Station opened on January 30, 1926.

== Passenger statistics ==
In fiscal 2019, the station was used by an average of 418 passengers daily.

== Surrounding area ==
- Osaka Prefectural Road No. 40 Kishiwada Ushitakiyama Shell Mound Line
- Kishima Elementary School, Kaizuka City

== See also ==
- List of railway stations in Japan
