= Maruyamashita Station =

Railway station in Kiryū, Gunma Prefecture, Japan

Maruyamashita Station 丸山下駅
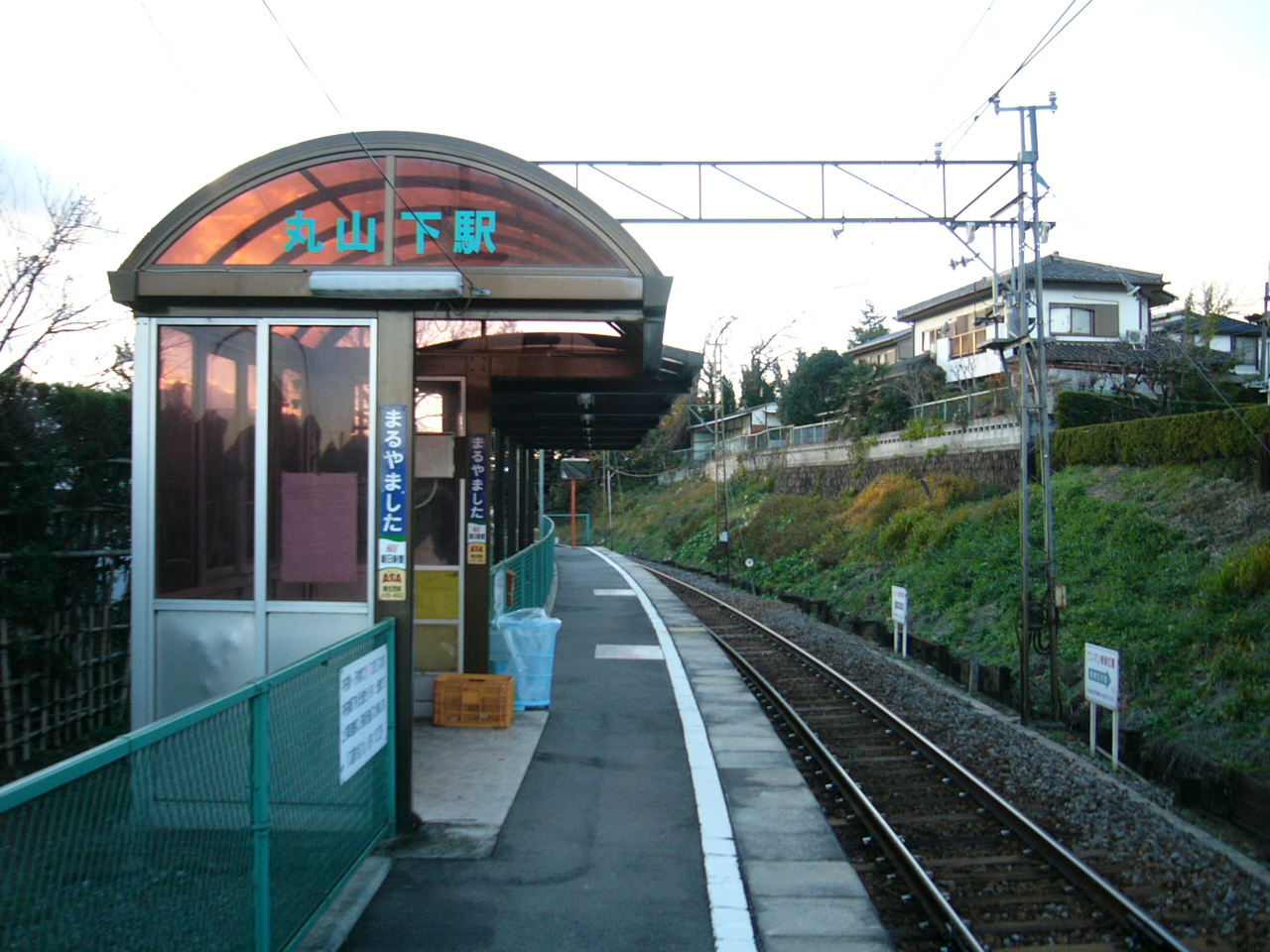
- Maruyamashita Station in December 2004

General information
- Location: Tsutsumicho 3-9-1, Kiryū-shi, Gunma-ken 376-0042; Japan
- Coordinates: 36.4170°N 139.3215°E
- Operator: Jōmō Electric Railway Company
- Line: ■ Jōmō Line
- Distance: 24.3 km from Chūō-Maebashi
- Platforms: 1 side platform
- Tracks: 1

Other information
- Status: Unstaffed
- Website: Official website

History
- Opened: November 10, 1928

Passengers
- FY2019: 53

Services
| Preceding station | Jōmō Electric Railway | Following station |
|---|---|---|
| Fujiyamashita towards Chūō-Maebashi | Jōmō Line | Nishi-Kiryū Terminus |
Location
- Location within Gunma Prefecture Location within Japan

Maruyamashita Station (丸山下駅, Maruyama-shita-eki) is a passenger railway station in the city of Kiryū, Gunma, Japan, operated by the private railway operator Jōmō Electric Railway Company.

== Lines ==
Maruyamashita Station is a station on the Jōmō Line, and is located 24.3 kilometers from the terminus of the line at Chūō-Maebashi .

== Station layout ==
The station has one side platform serving traffic in both directions. The station is unattended.

== History ==
Maruyamashita Station was opened on November 10, 1928.

== Passenger statistics ==
In fiscal 2019, the station was used by an average of 53 passengers daily (boarding passengers only).

== Surrounding area ==
- Watarase River

== See also ==
- List of railway stations in Japan
