= Mori Station (Osaka) =

Railway station in Kaizuka, Osaka Prefecture, Japan

Mori Station 森駅
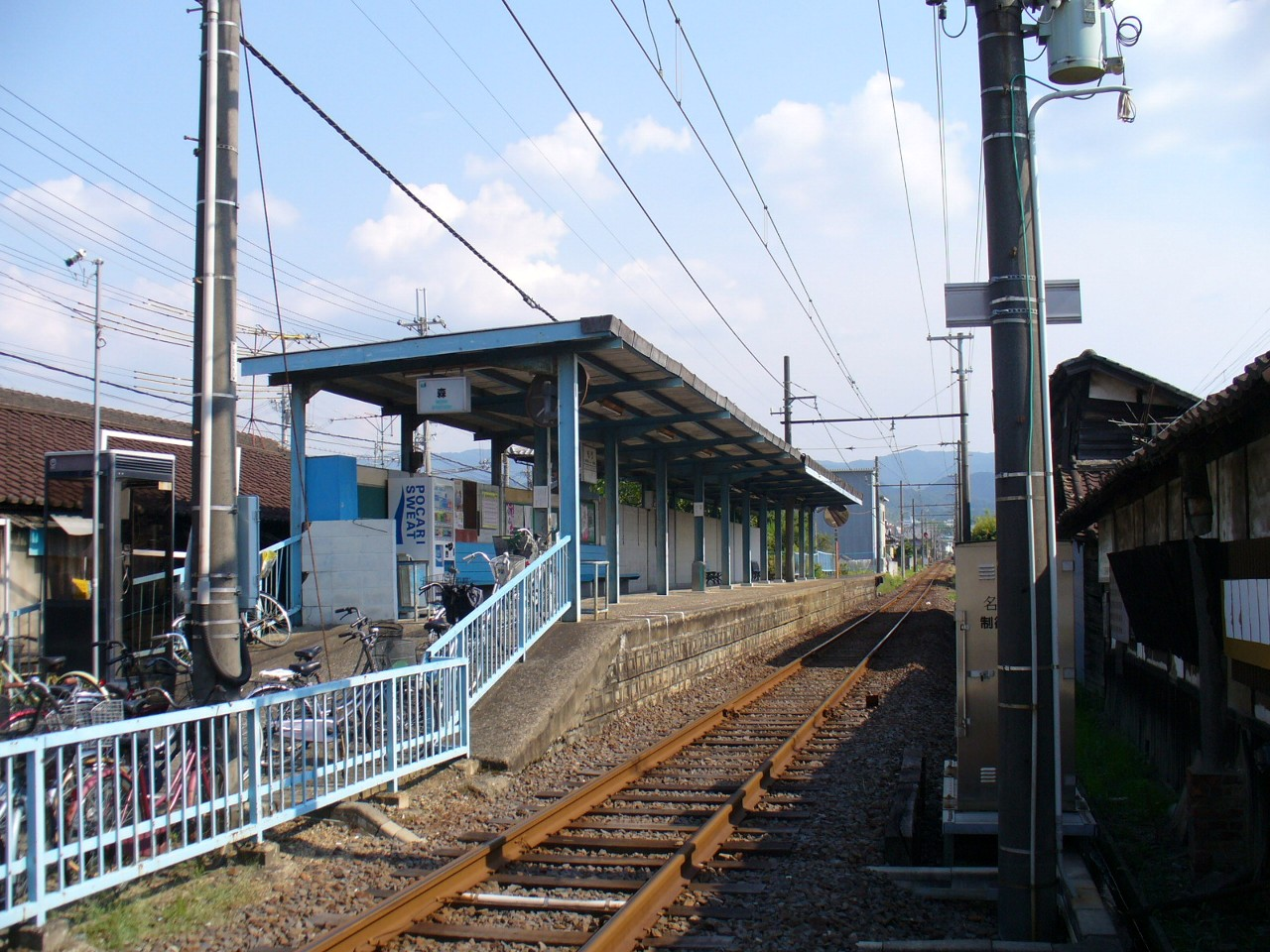
- Mori Station

General information
- Location: 47-7 Mori, Kaizuka-shi, Osaka-fu 597-0044; Japan
- Coordinates: 34°24′52″N 135°22′54″E
- Operator: Mizuma Railway
- Line: Mizuma Line
- Distance: 4.3 km from Kaizuka
- Platforms: 1 side platform
- Connections

Other information
- Status: Unstaffed

History
- Opened: January 30, 1926

Passengers
- 2019: 737 daily
Location
- Location within Osaka Prefecture Location within Japan

Mori Station (森駅, Mori-eki) is a passenger railway station located in the city of Kaizuka, Osaka Prefecture, Japan, operated by the private railway operator Mizuma Railway.

== Lines ==
Mori Station is served by the Mizuma Line, and is 4.3 kilometers from the terminus of the line at Kaizuka.

== Layout ==
The station consists of one side platform serving a single bi-directional track.The station is unattended.

== Adjacent stations ==
«	Service	»
Mizuma Railway Mizuma Line
Nagose	-	Mitsumatsu

== History ==
Mori Station opened on January 30, 1926.

== Passenger statistics ==
In fiscal 2019, the station was used by an average of 737 passengers daily.

== Surrounding area ==
- Mori Shrine
- Osaka Prefectural Road No. 40 Kishiwada Ushitakiyama Kaizuka Line

== See also ==
- List of railway stations in Japan
