= Mizuma Kannon Station =

Railway station in Kaizuka, Osaka Prefecture, Japan

Mizuma Kannon Station 水間観音駅
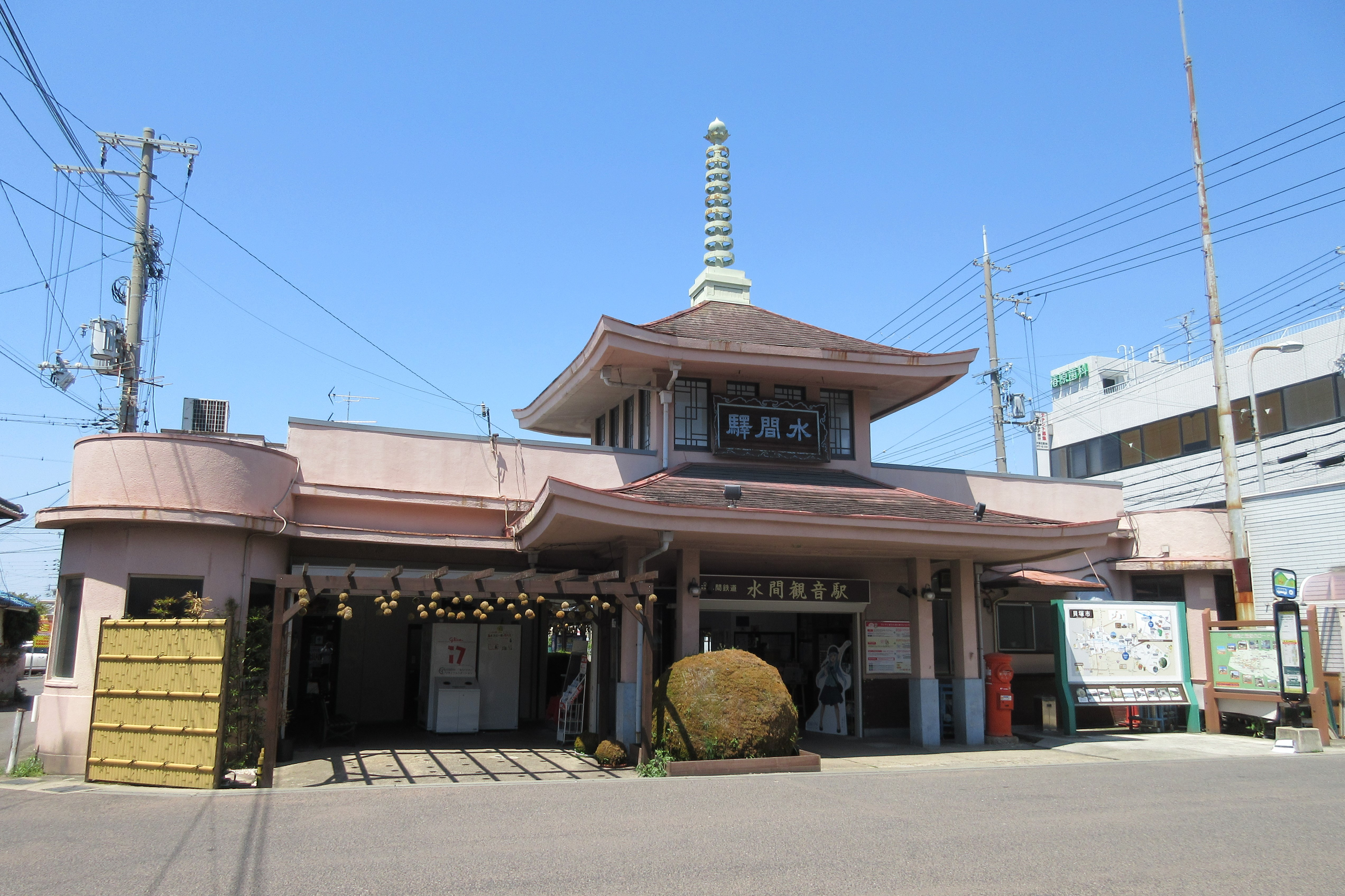
- Mizuma Kannon Station, May 2019

General information
- Location: 260 Mizuma, Kaizuka-shi, Osaka-fu 597-0105; Japan
- Coordinates: 34°24′11″N 135°23′08″E
- Operator: Mizuma Railway
- Line: Mizuma Line
- Distance: 5.5 km from Kaizuka
- Platforms: 1 island platform
- Connections: Bus terminal

Other information
- Status: Staffed

History
- Opened: January 30, 1926
- Former names: Mizuma (until 2009)

Passengers
- 2019: 1434 daily
Location
- Location within Osaka Prefecture Location within Japan

Mizuma Kannon Station (水間観音駅, Mizumakannon-eki) is a passenger railway station located in the city of Kaizuka, Osaka Prefecture, Japan, operated by the private railway operator Mizuma Railway.

== Lines ==
Mizuma Kannon Station is the eastern terminal station of the Mizuma Line, and is 5.5 kilometers from the opposing terminus of the line at Kaizuka.

== Layout ==
The station consists of one deadheaded island platform serving two tracks.

== Adjacent stations ==
«	Service	»
Mizuma Railway Mizuma Line
Mikayamaguchi	-	Terminus

== History ==
Mizuma Kannon Station opened on January 30, 1926 as Mizuma Station (水間駅).The reinforced concrete-made building from 1926 is a National Registered Tangible Cultural Property. The station was renamed from Mizuma to Mizuma Kannon on June 1, 2009.

== Passenger statistics ==
In fiscal 2019, the station was used by an average of 1434 passengers daily.

== Surrounding area ==
- Mizuma-dera (Mizuma Kannon)
- Mizuma Park
- Koon-ji
- Okumizuma Onsen
- Osaka Kawasaki Rehabilitation University
- Kaizuka City Katsuragi Elementary School
- Kaizuka City Eiju Elementary School

== See also ==
- List of railway stations in Japan
