= Osaka Kawasaki Rehabilitation University =

Coordinates: 34°24′18.4″N 135°23′12.2″E

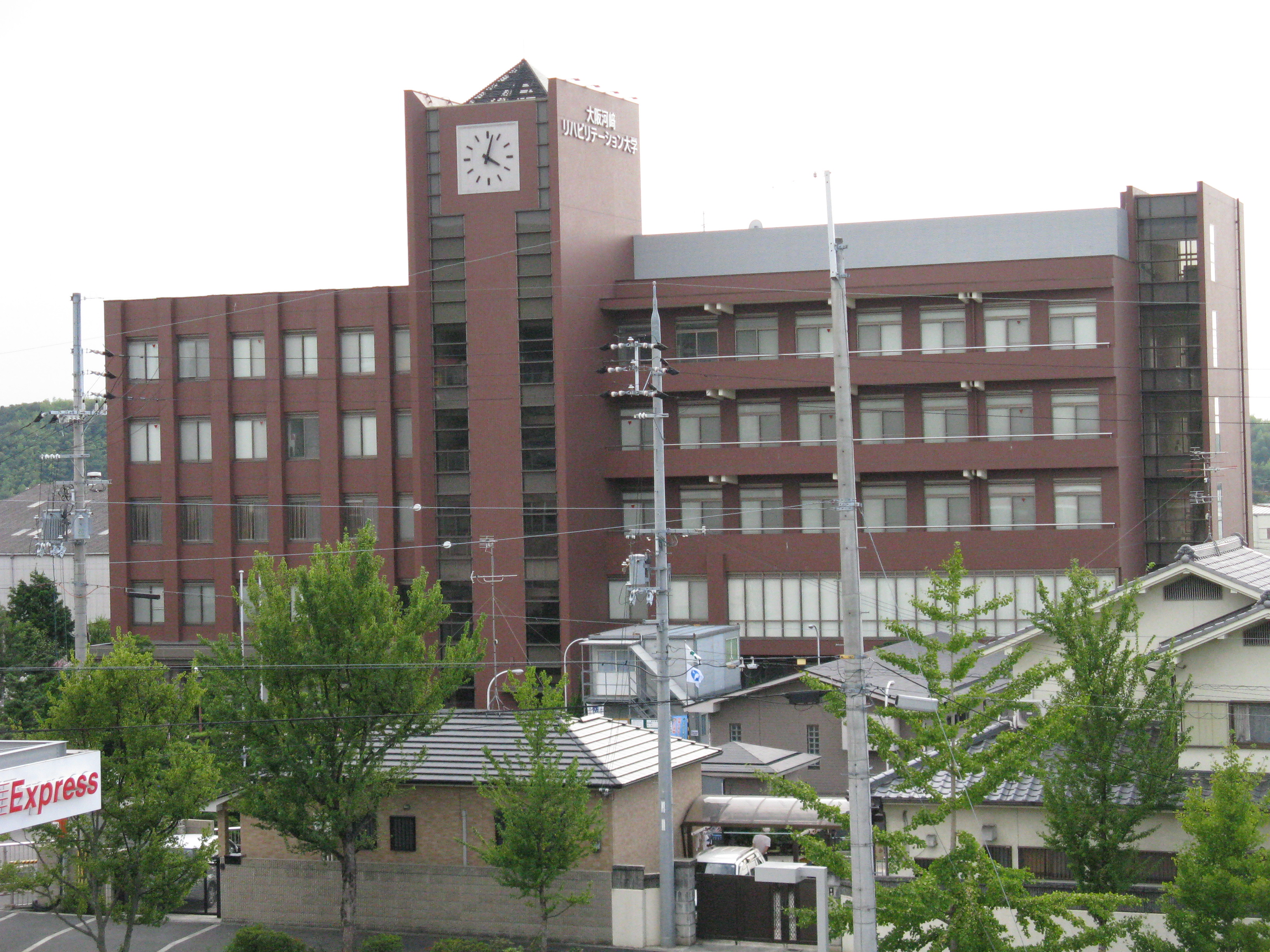
Osaka Kawasaki Rehabilitation University

Osaka Kawasaki Rehabilitation University (大阪河﨑リハビリテーション大学, Ōsaka Kawasaki Rihabiritēshon Daigaku) is a private university in Kaizuka, Osaka, Japan. The predecessor of the school was founded in 1997, and it was chartered as a university in 2006.
