= Kaizuka Station (Osaka) =

Railway station in Kaizuka, Osaka Prefecture, Japan

Kaizuka Station 貝塚駅
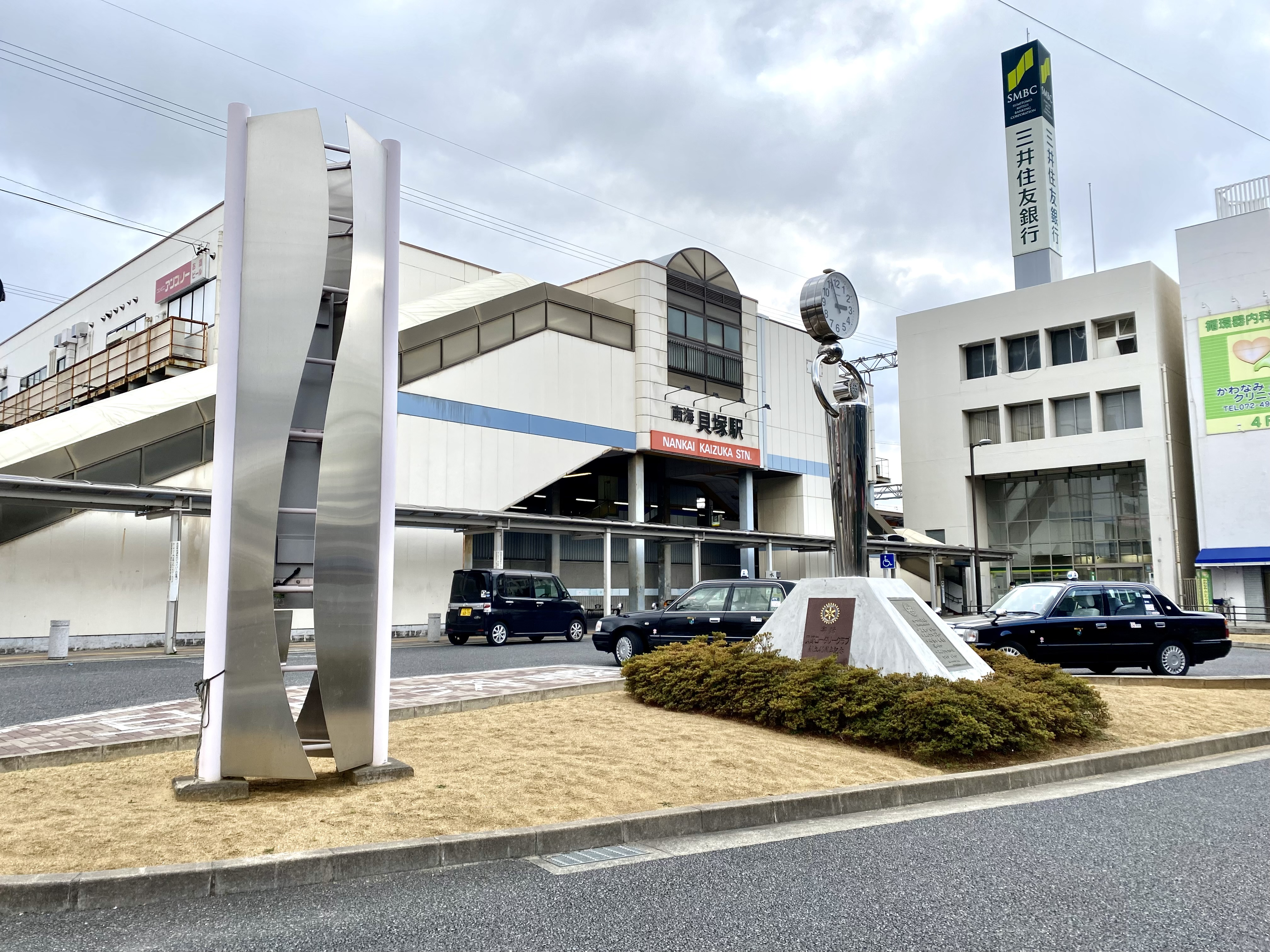
- Kaizuka Station, Nankai Railway, December 2021

General information
- Location: 250-2 Umizuka, Kaizuka-shi, Osaka-fu 597-0083; Japan
- Coordinates: 34°26′44″N 135°21′28″E
- Operator: Nankai Electric Railway; ■ Mizuma Railway
- Lines: Nankai Main Line; ■ Mizuma Line
- Distance: 34.0 km from Namba
- Platforms: 2 island + 1 bay platform

Other information
- Station code: NK26
- Website: Official website

History
- Opened: April 1914; 112 years ago

Passengers
- 2019: 20,079 daily (Nankai); 4,523 daily (Mizuma)
Location
- Location within Osaka Prefecture Location within Japan

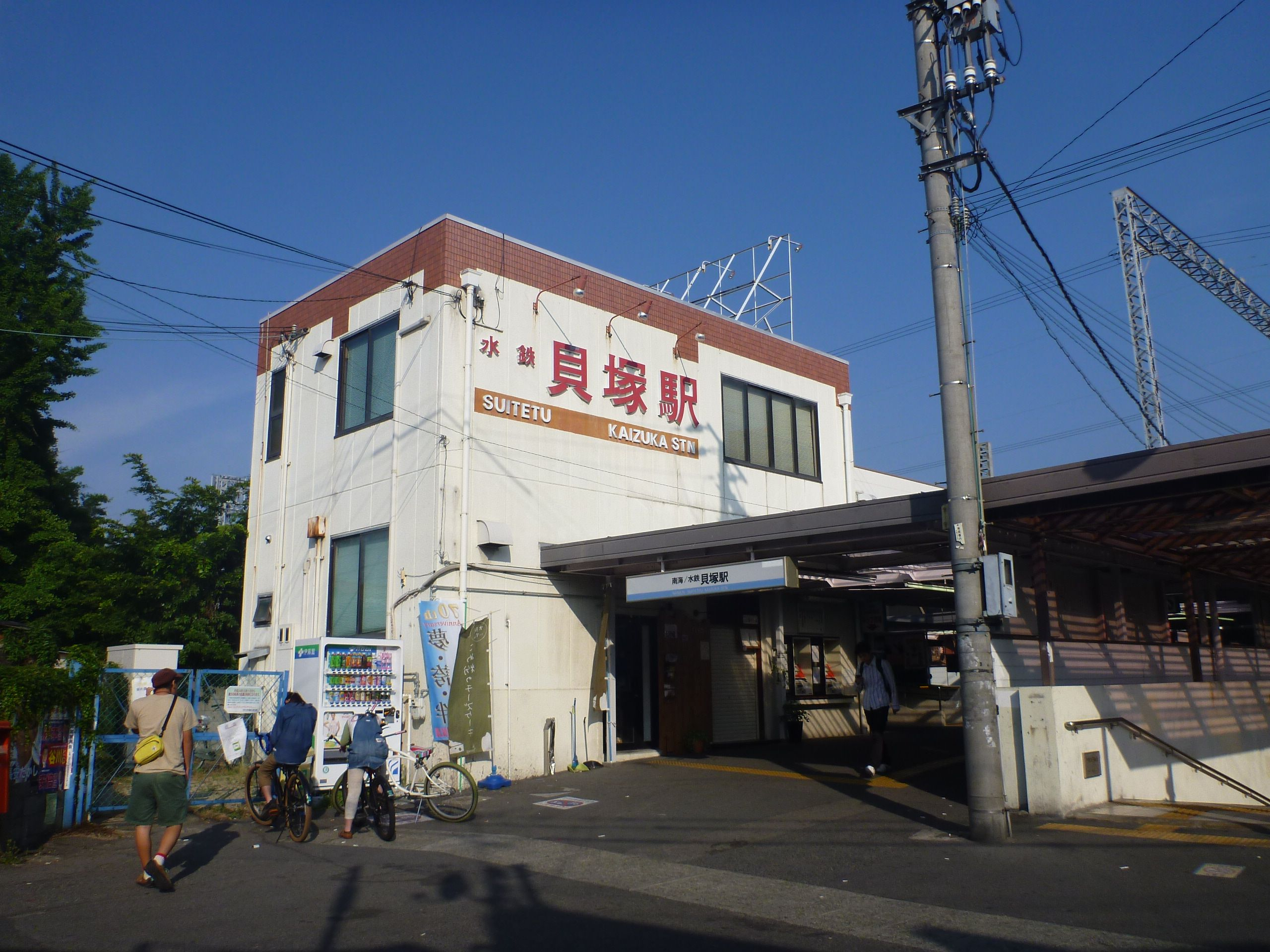
Station building of Mizuma Railway in June 2013

Kaizuka Station (貝塚駅, Kaizuka-eki) is an interchange passenger railway station located in the city of Kaizuka, Osaka Prefecture, Japan. The station is operated by two private railways, Nankai Electric Railway and the Mizuma Railway. It has station number "NK26" in the Nankai Electric Railway system.

== Lines ==
Kaizuka Station is served by the Nankai Main Line, and is 34.0 kilometers (21.1 mi) from the terminus of the line at Nanba. It is also the terminus of the 5.5-kilometer (3.4 mi) Mizuma Line, which connects Kaizuka to Mizuma Kannon.

== Layout ==
The station consists of two island platforms connected by an elevated station building for the Nankai Main Line and one ground level bay platform serving the Mizuma Line.

=== Platforms ===
| 1, 2 | ■ Nankai Main Line | for Wakayamashi and Kansai Airport |
| 3, 4 | ■ Nankai Main Line | for Namba |
| 1, 2 | ■ Mizuma Line | for Mizuma Kannon |

== Adjacent stations ==
| « | Service | » |
Nankai Main Line
Limited Express "rapi:t α" for Kansai Airport (特急ラピートα): Does not stop at this station
Limited Express "rapi:t β" (特急ラピートβ): Does not stop at this station
Limited Express "Southern" (特急サザン): Does not stop at this station
Limited Express without seat reservations (自由席特急): Does not stop at this station
| Kishiwada | Express (急行) | Izumisano |
| Kishiwada | Airport Express (空港急行) | Izumisano |
| Kishiwada | Sub. Express (区間急行) | Izumisano |
| Takojizō | Semi-Express for Namba (準急, in the morning on weekdays) | Nishikinohama |
| Takojizō | Local (普通車) | Nishikinohama |
Mizuma Railway Mizuma Line
| Terminus | - | Kaizuka Shiyakushomae |

== History ==
Kaizuka Station opened on 1 October 1897 on the Nankai Railway. The Mizuma Railway began operations on 25 April 1933.

== Passenger statistics ==
In fiscal 2019, the Nankai Electric portion the station was used by an average of 20,079 passengers daily. During the same period, then Mizuma Railway portion of the station was used by 4,523 passengers daily.

== Surrounding area ==
- Gansen-
- Kaizuka Post Office

== See also ==
- List of railway stations in Japan
