= List of railway stations in Japan: W =

List of railway stations in Japan

A	B	C	D	E	F	G	H	I	J	KL	M	N	O	P	R	S	T	U	W	Y	Z

This list shows the railway stations in Japan that begin with the letter W. This is a subset of the full list of railway stations in Japan.

== Station list ==
Wabuchi Station	和渕駅（わぶち）
Wabuka Station	和深駅（わぶか）
Wachi Station	和知駅（わち）
Wada Station	和田駅（わだ）
Wadazuka Station	和田塚駅（わだづか）
Wadagahara Station	和田河原駅（わだがはら）
Wadahama Station	和田浜駅（わだはま）
Wadamachi Station	和田町駅（わだまち）
Wadamisaki Station	和田岬駅（わだみさき）
Wadaura Station	和田浦駅（わだうら）
Wadayama Station	和田山駅（わだやま）
Wado Station	和戸駅（わど）
Wadō Kuroya Station	和銅黒谷駅（わどうくろや）
Wajiki Station	和食駅（わじき）
Wajiro Station	和白駅（わじろ）
Wakaba Station	若葉駅（わかば）
Wakabadai Station	若葉台駅（わかばだい）
Wakabayashi Station (Aichi)	若林駅 (愛知県)（わかばやし）
Wakabayashi Station (Tokyo)	若林駅 (東京都)（わかばやし）
Wakae-Iwata Station	若江岩田駅（わかえいわた）
Wakaguri Station	若栗駅（わかぐり）
Wakai Station	若井駅（わかい）
Wakamatsu Station	若松駅（わかまつ）
Wakamatsu-Kawada Station	若松河田駅（わかまつかわだ）
Wakamiya Station	若宮駅（わかみや）
Wakasa Station	若桜駅（わかさ）
Wakasa-Arita Station	若狭有田駅（わかさありた）
Wakasa-Hongō Station	若狭本郷駅（わかさほんごう）
Wakasa-Takahama Station	若狭高浜駅（わかさたかはま）
Wakasa-Wada Station	若狭和田駅（わかさわだ）
Waka-Sennin Station	和賀仙人駅（わかせんにん）
Wakayama Station	和歌山駅（わかやま）
Wakayamadaigakumae Station	和歌山大学前駅（わかやまだいがくまえ）
Wakayamakō Station	和歌山港駅（わかやまこう）
Wakayamashi Station	和歌山市駅（わかやまし）
Wakayanagi Station	若柳駅（わかやなぎ）
Wake Station	和気駅（わけ）
Waki Station	和木駅（わき）
Wakigami Station	掖上駅（わきがみ）
Wakimoto Station	脇本駅（わきもと）
Wakinoda Station	脇野田駅（わきのだ）
Wakinosawa Station	脇ノ沢駅（わきのさわ）
Wakkanai Station	稚内駅（わっかない）
Wakōshi Station	和光市駅（わこうし）
Wakuraonsen Station	和倉温泉駅（わくらおんせん）
Wakuya Station	涌谷駅（わくや）
Wani Station	和邇駅（わに）
Wanishi Station	輪西駅（わにし）
Warabi Station	蕨駅（わらび）
Warabitai Station	蕨岱駅（わらびたい）
Waridashi Station	割出駅（わりだし）
Wasa Station	和佐駅（わさ）
Waseda Station (Toden)	早稲田停留場（わせだ）
Waseda Station (Tokyo Metro)	早稲田駅（わせだ）
Washibetsu Station	鷲別駅（わしべつ）
Washizu Station	鷲津駅（わしづ）
Washizuka-Haribara Station	鷲塚針原駅（わしづかはりばら）
Washinomiya Station	鷲宮駅（わしのみや）
Washinosu Station	鷲ノ巣駅（わしのす）
Wassamu Station	和寒駅（わっさむ）
Watada Station	和多田駅（わただ）
Watanabebashi Station	渡辺橋駅（わたなべばし）
Watanabedōri Station	渡辺通駅（わたなべどおり）
Watanoha Station	渡波駅（わたのは）
Watarase Station	渡瀬駅 (群馬県)（わたらせ）
Watari Station (Kumamoto)	渡駅（わたり）
Watari Station (Miyagi)	亘理駅（わたり）
Watarigawa Station	渡川駅（わたりがわ）
Wataze Station	渡瀬駅 (福岡県)（わたぜ）
Wespa Tsubakiyama Station	ウェスパ椿山駅（うぇすぱつばきやま）
Woody Town Chūō Station	ウッディタウン中央駅（うっでぃたうんちゅうおう）
