= Osaka City Air Terminal =

Transportation and shopping terminal in Japan

Coordinates: 34.666407°N 135.495248°E

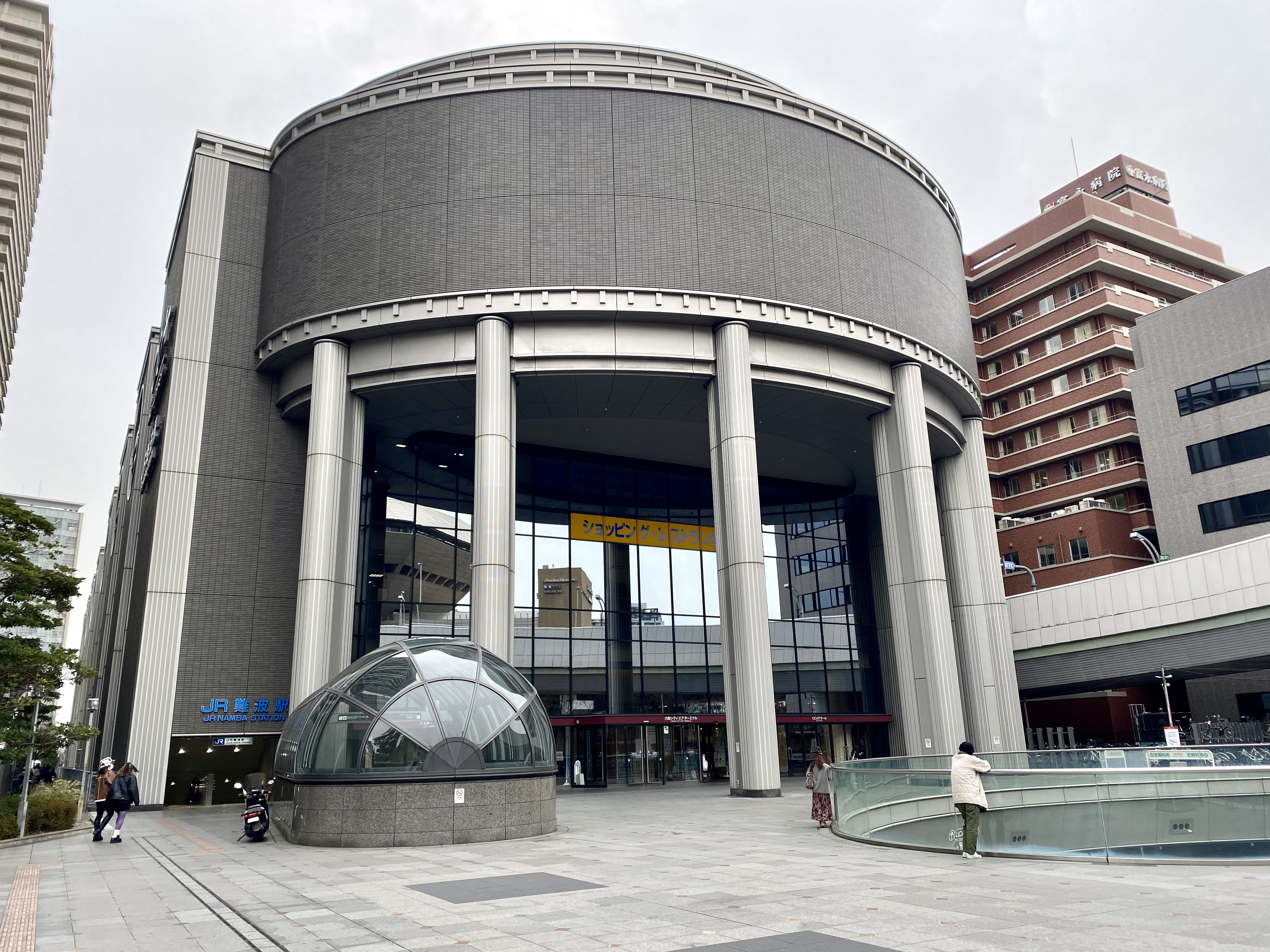
Osaka City Air Terminal

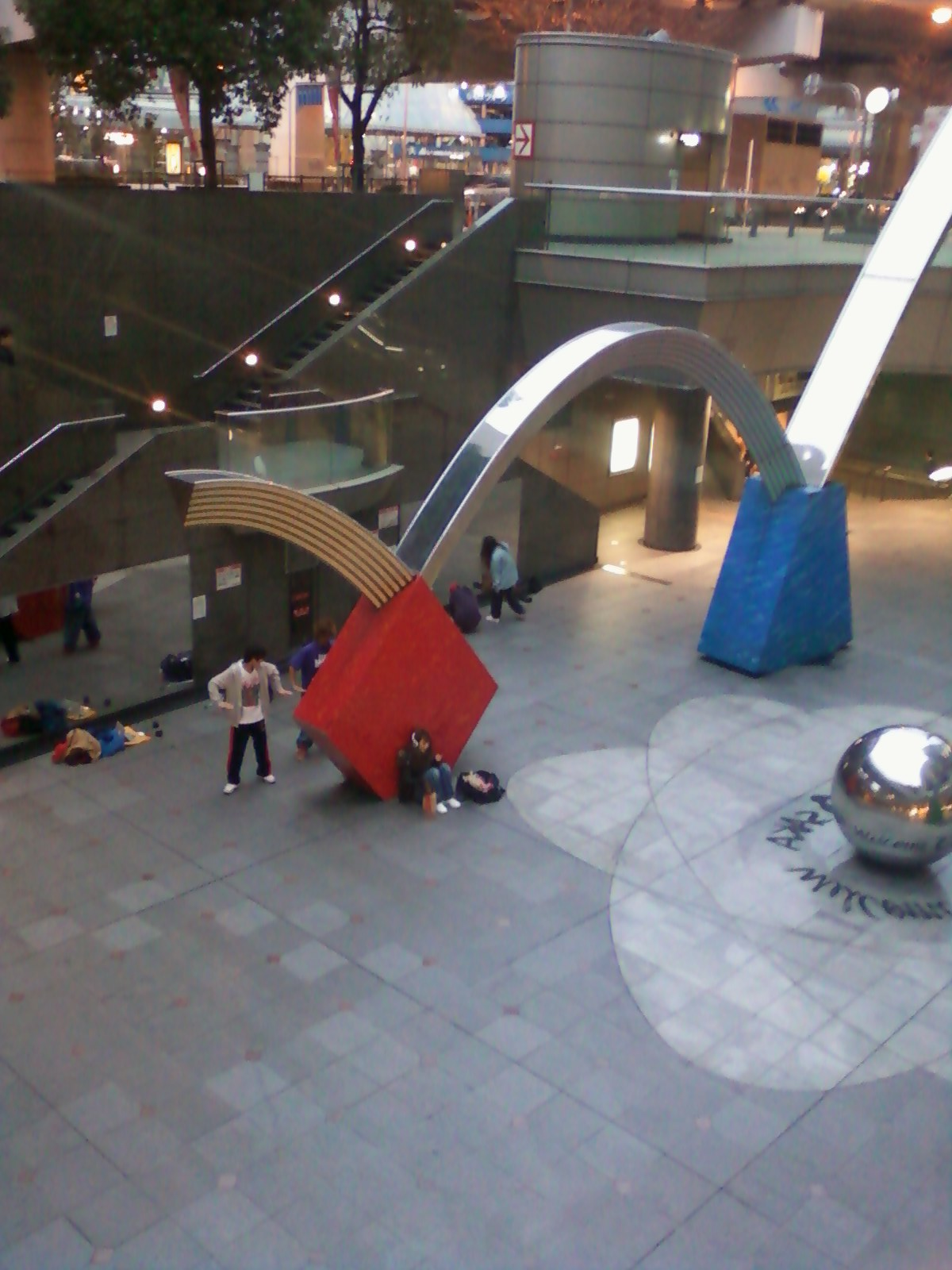
The main entrance to OCAT

Osaka City Air Terminal (OCAT) is a multi-purpose commercial complex in Minatomachi, Naniwa-ku, Osaka housing South Osaka's inter-city bus terminal and coach ferry services to both Kansai International Airport and Osaka Itami Airport, JR Namba station and six floors of shops, restaurants, travel agencies and tourist offices. OCAT is also the venue for frequent musical performances and its outdoor Ponte Square area is the meeting place and practice area for Osaka's youthful street dance community. Urban dance competitions are held there every August.

Despite the name of the complex, OCAT is not actually an air terminal itself but part of an extended, inter-connected underground transport hub to Kansai International Airport and Osaka Itami Airport. Namba Station, the terminal for south Osaka City-bound train services (including Kansai International) is within 15 minutes walking distance from OCAT via the Namba Walk - an underground passageway lined with shops, bars and restaurants.

== Floors ==
- Roof: Roof Garden (closed from December to March)
- 6th floor: Offices
- 5th floor: Namba Municipal Tax Office、Restaurants, Bookstore (COMICS JUNKUDO Namba)
- 4th floor: Osaka Lifelong Learning Center Namba, Namba Municipal Tax Office, Airline offices, Tourist information, Fortune
- 3rd floor: Liquor and Imported foods (Yamaya), General stores, Relaxation
- 2nd floor: Bus terminal, UNICEF office
- 1st floor: Entrance, Fashion Mall, Post Office, Daiso
- 1st basement: JR Namba Station, Restaurants, Pharmacy, Convenience store, passage to Minatomachi River Place, passage to Namba Walk
- 3rd and 4th basement: Seijukai Medical Center

== Bus terminal ==
Osaka Airport Transport Co., Ltd., Kansai Airport Transportation Enterprise Co., Ltd., Kintetsu Bus Co., Ltd., Nankai Bus Co., Ltd., West JR Bus Company, JR Bus Kanto Co., Ltd., JR Tokai Bus Company, Chugoku JR Bus Company, JR Shikoku Bus Company, Hankyu Bus Co., Ltd., Honshi Kaikyo Bus Co., Ltd., Nihon Kotsu Co., Ltd. (Osaka), Nihon Kotsu Co., Ltd. (Tottori), etc.

- Gates 1, 2, 3
  - Sightseeing buses, Tour buses
- Gate 4
  - Airport limousine for Osaka Itami Airport
  - Flying Sneaker Osaka; for Tokyo Station
  - Chuodo Hiru Tokkyu/Seishun Chuo Eco Dream; for Yaho Station, Shinjuku Station, and Tokyo Station
  - Crystal Liner; for Nirasaki Station, Ryūō Station, and Kōfu Station
  - Fujiyama Liner; for Higashi-Shizuoka Station, Fuji Station, Fujinomiya Station, Fuji-Q Highland, Kawaguchiko Station, and Fujisan Station
  - Wakasa Liner; for Wakasa-Wada Station, Wakasa-Hongō Station, and Obama Station
  - Direct Express Choku-Q Kyoto; for Katanoshi Station, Kawachi-Iwafune Station, Kyōto Station
  - Direct Express Choku-Q Kyoto; for Katanoshi station, Kawachi-Iwafune Station, Matsuiyamate Station, and Kyōtanabe City Office
  - Direct Express Choku-Q Kyoto; for Hotel Keihan Universal Tower
  - Awa Express Osaka; for Maiko Station, and Tokushima Station
  - Tropical; for Kagoshima Airport, Kagoshima-Chūō Station, and Kagoshima Port
- Gate 5
  - Airport limousine for Kansai International Airport
  - Dream/GranDream/Premium Dream/ Seishun Eco Dream/Tokaido Hiru Tokkyu; for Shinjuku Station, and Tokyo Station
  - Dream Namba Sakai; for Shinjuku Station, and Tokyo Station
  - Flying Liner; for Yokohama Station, Tokyo Station, Ueno Station, and Asakusa Station
  - for Takayama Station
  - for Izumiōtsu Port
  - Kabutogani; for Satoshō Station, Kasaoka City Office, Ibara Station, Komoriutanosato-Takaya Station, and Kannabe
  - Kure Dream Hiroshima; for Saijō Station, Hiroshima University, and Kure Station
  - Awa Express Osaka; for Maiko Station, and Tokushima Station
  - Kochi Express; for Kōchi Station, Harimayabashi Station, and Susaki Station
- Gate 6
  - Southern Cross; for Akihabara Station, Yotsukaidō Station, Keisei Narita Station, Narita International Airport, Sawara Station, and Chōshi Station
  - Southern Cross; for Odawara Station, Fujisawa Station, Kamakura Station, Ōfuna Station, and Totsuka Station
  - Southern Cross; for Hashimoto Station, Akishima Station, Tachikawa Station, and Tamagawa-Jōsui Station
  - Southern Cross; for Kashiwazaki Station, Nagaoka Station, and Higashi-Sanjō Station
  - Southern Cross; for Nagano Station, Suzaka Station, Shinshu-Nakano Station, Iiyama Station, and Yudanaka Station
  - Ryobi Express; for Okayama Station, Kurashiki Station
  - Takamatsu Express Osaka; for Takamatsu Station
  - Takanan Foot Bus; takamatsu Station, Kokubunji Bus Terminal
  - Kochi Express; for Kōchi Station, Harimayabashi Station, and Susaki Station
  - Matsuyama Express; Matsuyama City Station, Uchiko Station, Iyo-Ōzu Station, Yawatahama Station, and Yawatahama Port
- Gate 7
  - Arcadia; for Nan'yō City Office, and Yamagata Station
  - Forest; for Sendai Station (Miyagi)
  - Galaxy; for Kōriyama Station, Fukushima Station
  - Seagull; for Hitachi City Office, Takahagi Station, Isohara Station, and Iwaki Station
  - Yokappe; for Tsukuba Station, Tsuchiura Station, and Mito Station
  - Tochinoki; for Kuki Station, Tochigi Station, and Utsunomiya Station
  - Twinkle / Casual Twinkle; for Hachiōji Station, Keiō-hachiōji Station and Shinjuku Station
  - Ryobi Express/Kibi Express Osaka; for Okayama Station
  - Bingo Liner; for Fukuyama Station, Fuchū, and Onomichi Station
  - San'in Tokkyu Bus; for Tottori Station
  - San'in Tokkyu Bus; for Kurayoshi Station
  - San'in Tokkyu Bus; for Yonago Station
  - Karst; for Tokuyama Station, Hōfu Station, and Hagi
  - Shimanto Blue Liner; for Kubokawa Station, Nakamura Station, and Sukumo Station
  - Sunrise / Aso Kuma; for Kumamoto Station
  - Holland; for Ōmura, Isahaya, Nagasaki Station
  - Sorin; for Nakatsu Station, Usa, and Ōita Station
- Gate 8
  - Silk Liner; for Saitama-Shintoshin Station, Ashikaga Station, Ōta Station, Kiryū Station, Isesaki Station, Takasaki Station, Shin-Maebashi Station, and Maebashi Station
  - for Nishi-Maizuru Station, Higashi-Maizuru Station
  - Shirahama Express Osaka; for Inami, Minabe, Haya Station, Tanabe Station, and Shirahama
  - Kuniumi Liner; for Awaji, Sumoto
  - for Fukuchiyama Station
- Gate 9
  - for getting off
  - Intercity bus departing for Higashi-Maizuru at 8:30 p.m.
- Gate 10
  - Only for getting off
