= Aonogō Station =

Railway station in Takahama, Fukui Prefecture, Japan

Aonogō Station 青郷駅
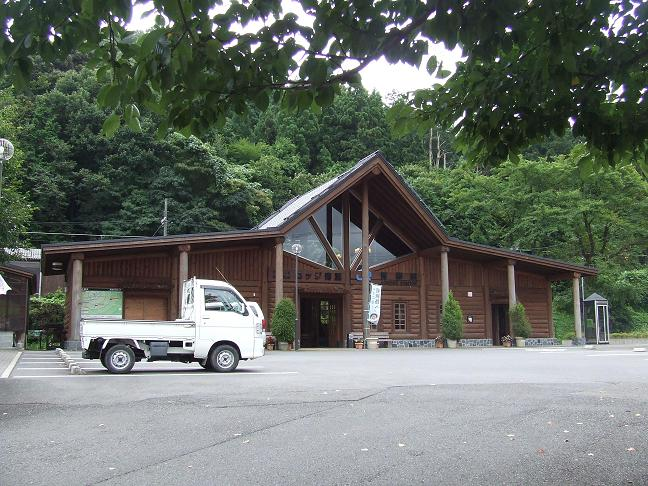
- Aonogō Station in August 2009

General information
- Location: 1-15 Aoi, Takahama-cho, Ōi-gun, Fukui-ken; Japan
- Coordinates: 35.4814°N 135.5000°E
- Distance: 73.5 km from Tsuruga
- Platforms: 1 side platform
- Tracks: 1

Other information
- Status: Staffed
- Website: Official website

History
- Opened: 1 November 1940

Passengers
- FY 2023: 150 daily
Location
- Location within Japan

Aonogō Station (青郷駅, Aonogō-eki) is a railway station in the town of Takahama, Ōi District, Fukui Prefecture, Japan, operated by West Japan Railway Company (JR West).

== Lines ==
Aonogō Station is served by the Obama Line, and is located 73.5 kilometers from the terminus of the line at Tsuruga.

== Station layout ==
The station consists of one side platform serving a single bi-directional track. The station is staffed.

== Adjacent stations ==
«	Service	»
Obama Line
Mitsumatsu	-	Matsunoodera

== History ==
Aonogō Station opened on 1 November 1940. With the privatization of Japanese National Railways (JNR) on 1 April 1987, the station came under the control of JR West. The station building was rebuilt in 2005 in a log-cabin style.

== Passenger statistics ==
In fiscal 2016, the station was used by an average of 134 passengers daily (boarding passengers only).

== Surrounding area ==
- National Route 27
- Aonogō Elementary School

== See also ==
- List of railway stations in Japan
