= Matsunoo-dera =

Buddhist temple in Maizuru, Kyoto, Japan

- 松尾寺
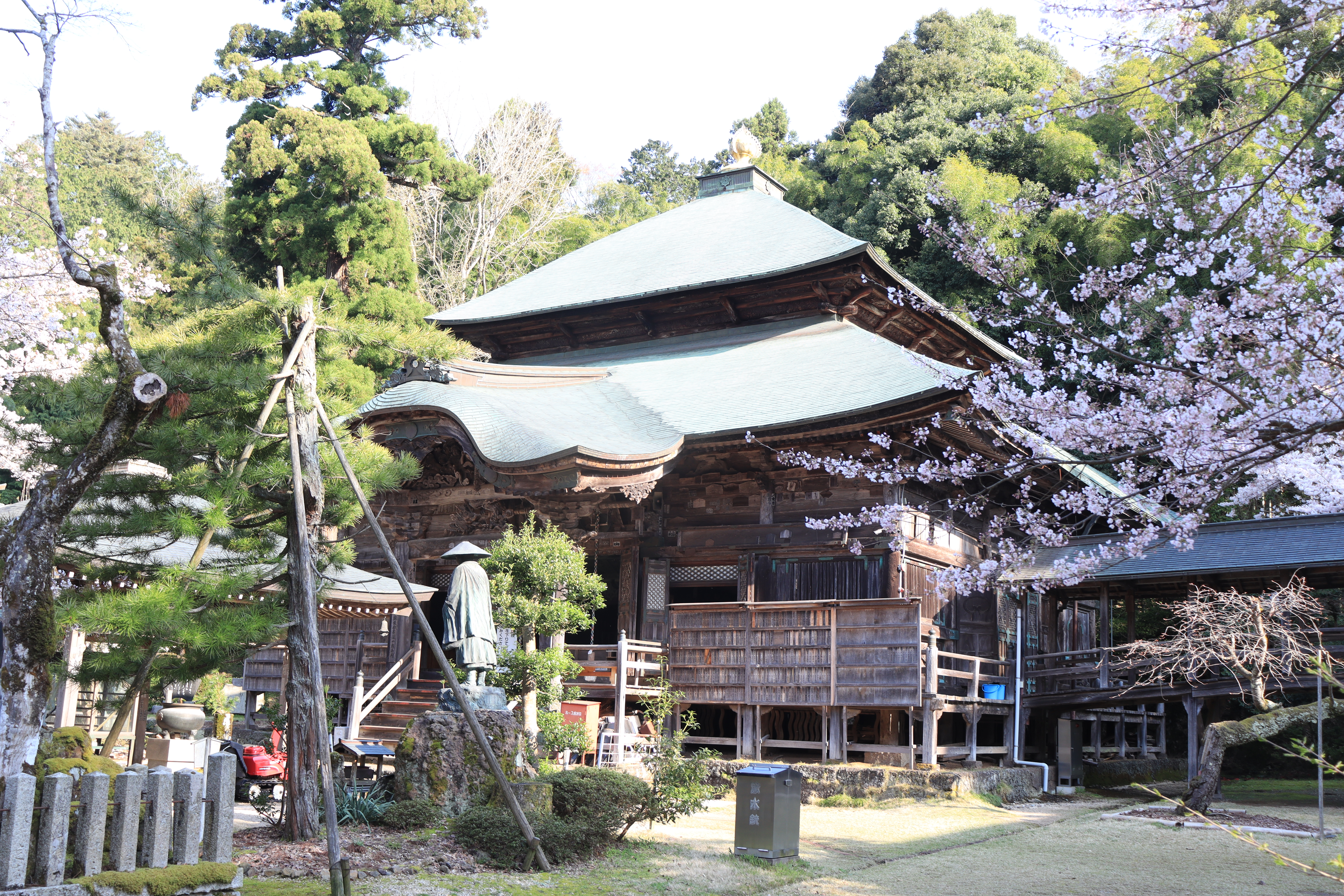
- Matsunoo-dera Hondo

- Location within Kyoto Prefecture Location within Japan

Religion
- Affiliation: Buddhist
- Deity: Batō Kannon Bosatsu
- Rite: Shingon-shū Daigo-ha
- Status: functional

Location
- Location: 532 Matsuo, Maizuru-shi, Kyoto-fu 625-0010
- Interactive map of Matsunoo-dera
- Coordinates: 35°29′50.74″N 135°28′9.75″E

Architecture
- Founder: c.Iko
- Completed: c.708

Website
- Official website
- National Treasure National Important Cultural Property

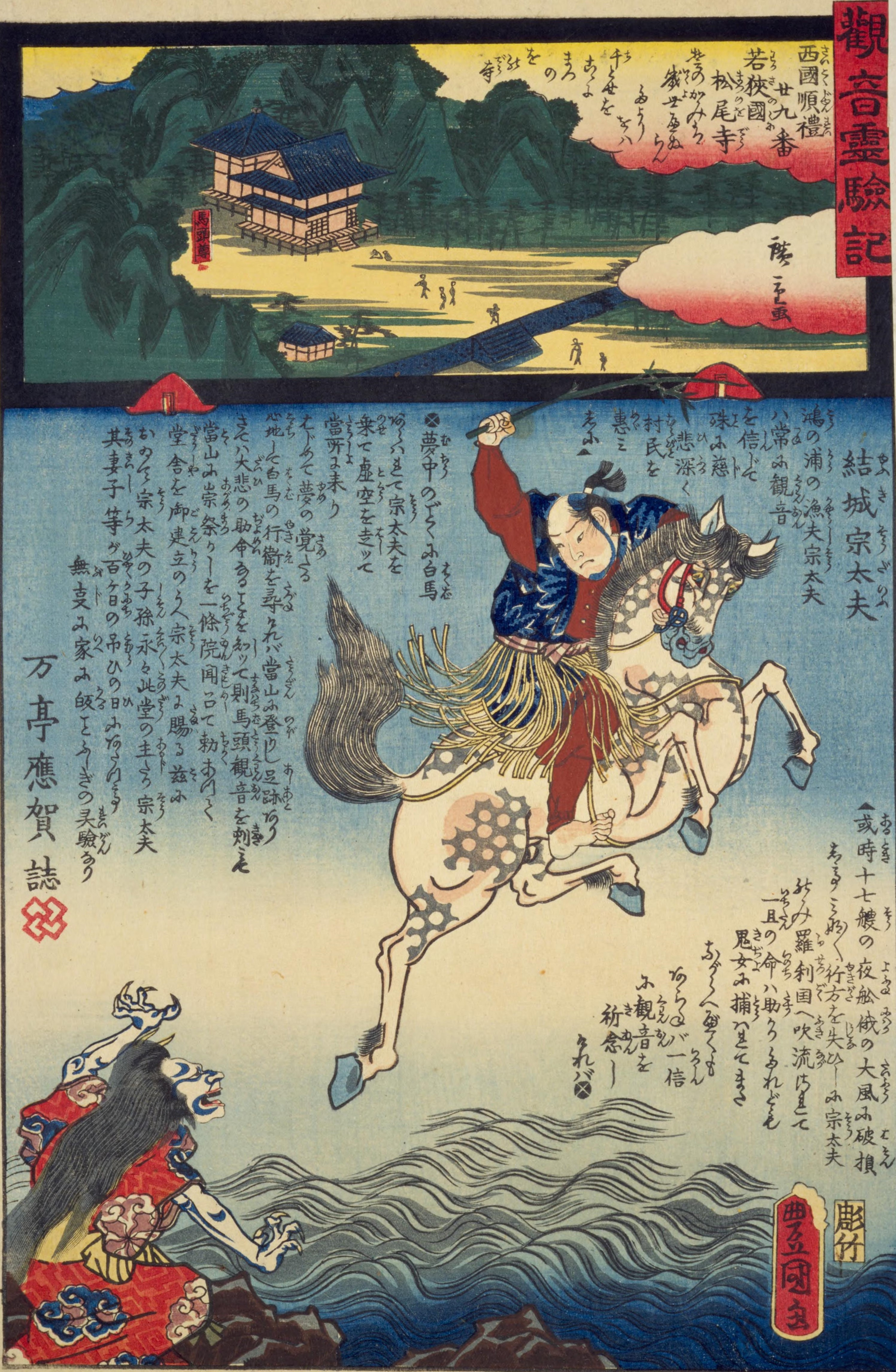
Ukiyoe “Yūki Sōdayū, Matsunoo-dera, Wakasa Province, 29th Temple on the Saigoku Pilgrimage”, in Kan'on reigenki

Matsunoo-dera (松尾寺) is a Buddhist temple located in the Matsuo neighborhood of the city of Maizuru, Kyoto Prefecture, Japan. It belongs to the Shingon-shū Daigo-ha sect of Japanese Buddhism and its honzon (primary image) is a hibutsu hidden image, a statue of Batō Kannon Bosatsu. The temple's full name is Aoba-san Matsunoo-ji (青葉山松尾寺).The temple is the 29th stop on the 33 temple Saigoku Kannon Pilgrimage route. The temple is located on the Sea of Japan, at an elevation of about 250 meters on the southern slope of Mount Aoba (also known as "Wakasa Fuji"), which is 693 meters above sea level.

== History ==
According to legend, during the Keiun era (704-708), the monk Iko from Tang China climbed Mount Aoba and perceived the spiritual force of Batō Kannon under a large tree. In 708, he built a small hermitage and carved an image of Batō Kannon as its main image.

The temple first appears in the historical record in 1119, when Emperor Toba visited it, and awarded it estates with revenues of 4000 koku for its upkeep. The temple flourished, and at one time had 65 subsidiaries.

The temple was destroyed by fire on numerous occasions, but was rebuilt each time with the support of the Hosokawa clan, and later the Kyōgoku clan. The current main hall was renovated by Makino Hidenari, daimyō of Tango-Tanabe Domain in 1730.

== Images of the temple ==
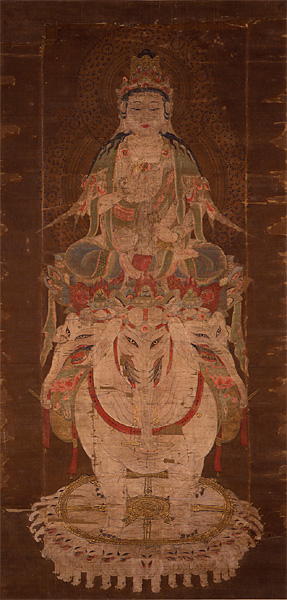
Colored Silk painting of Fugen Enmei (NT)

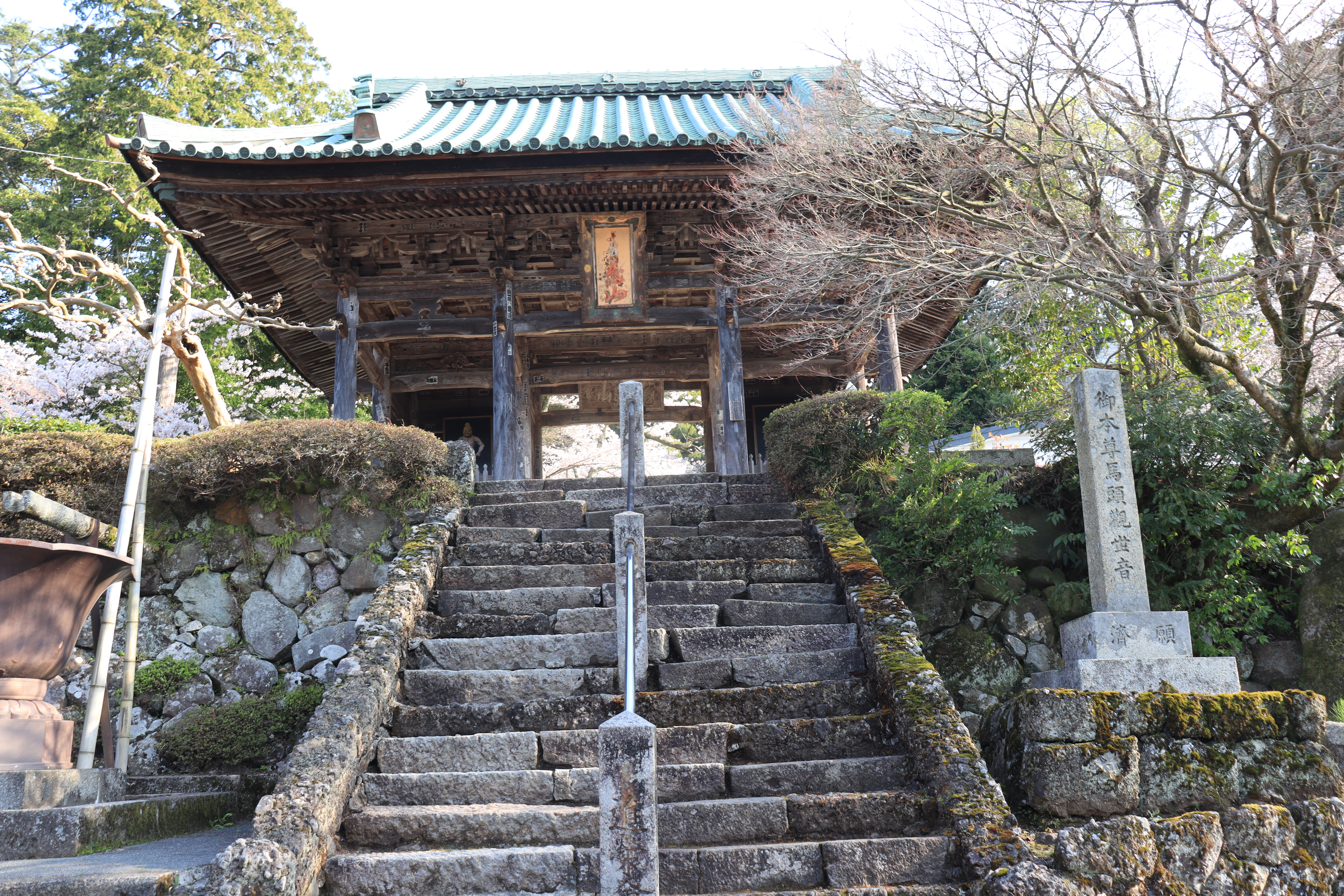
Niōmon

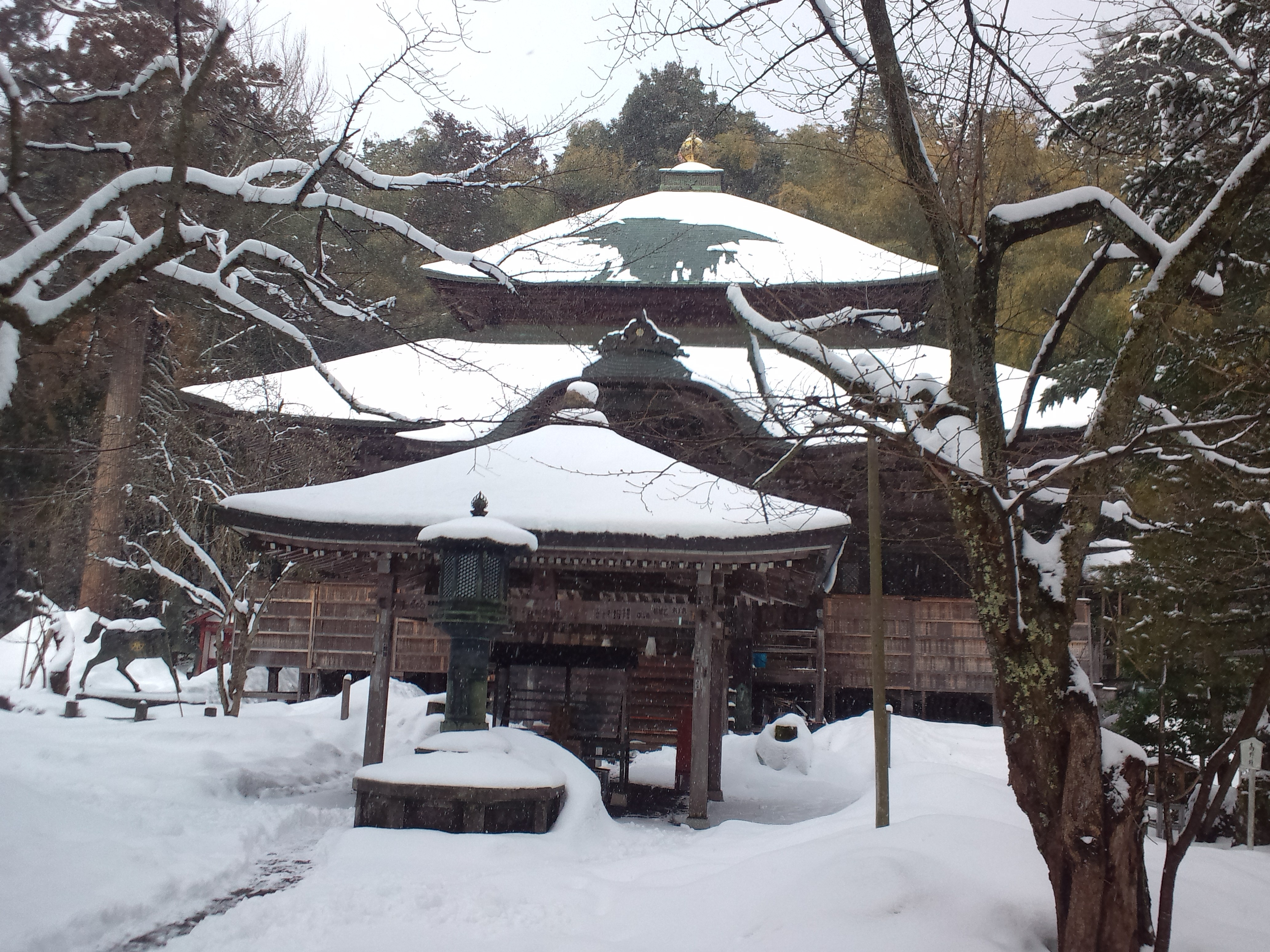
Hondō

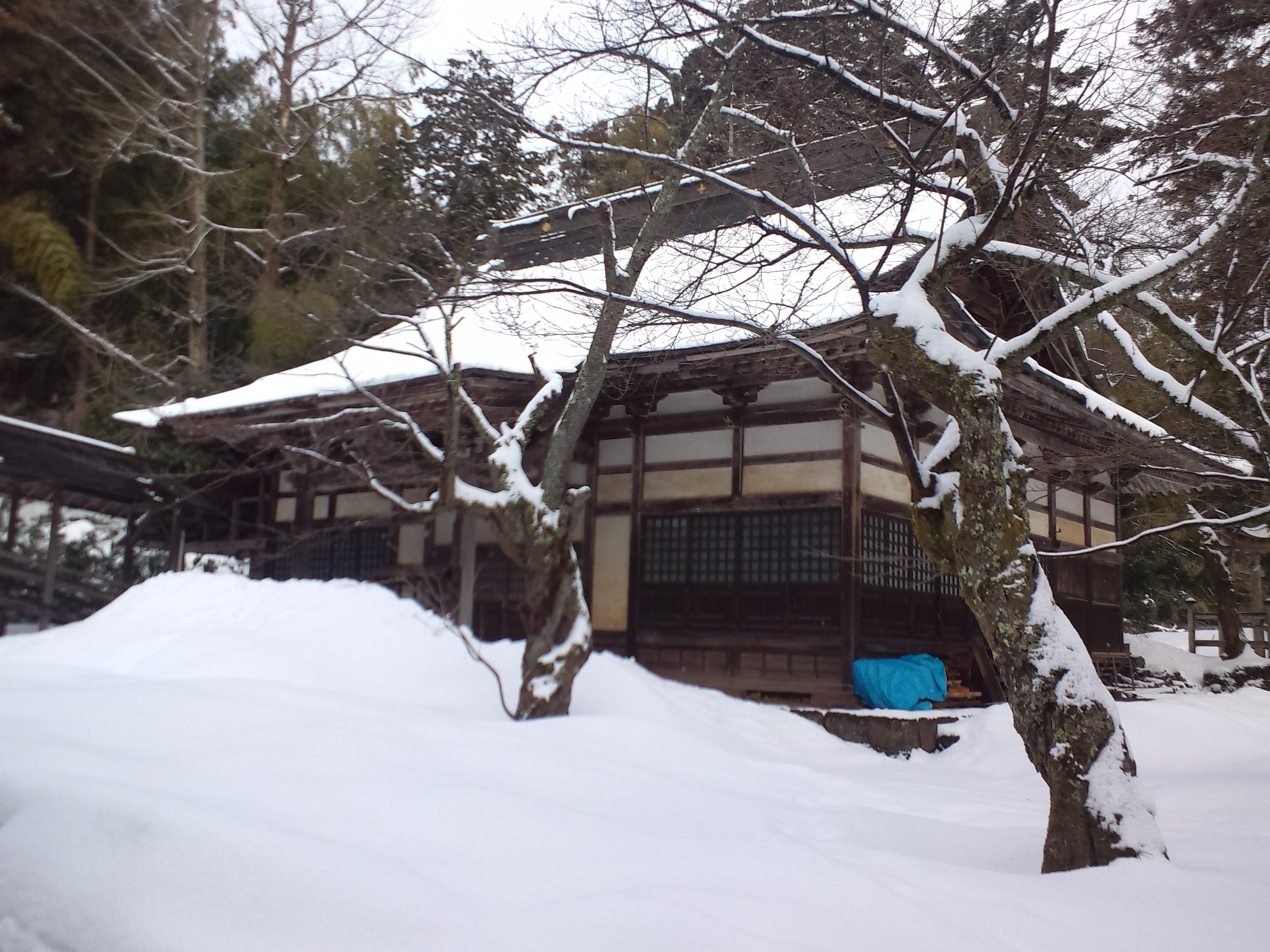
Daishi-dō

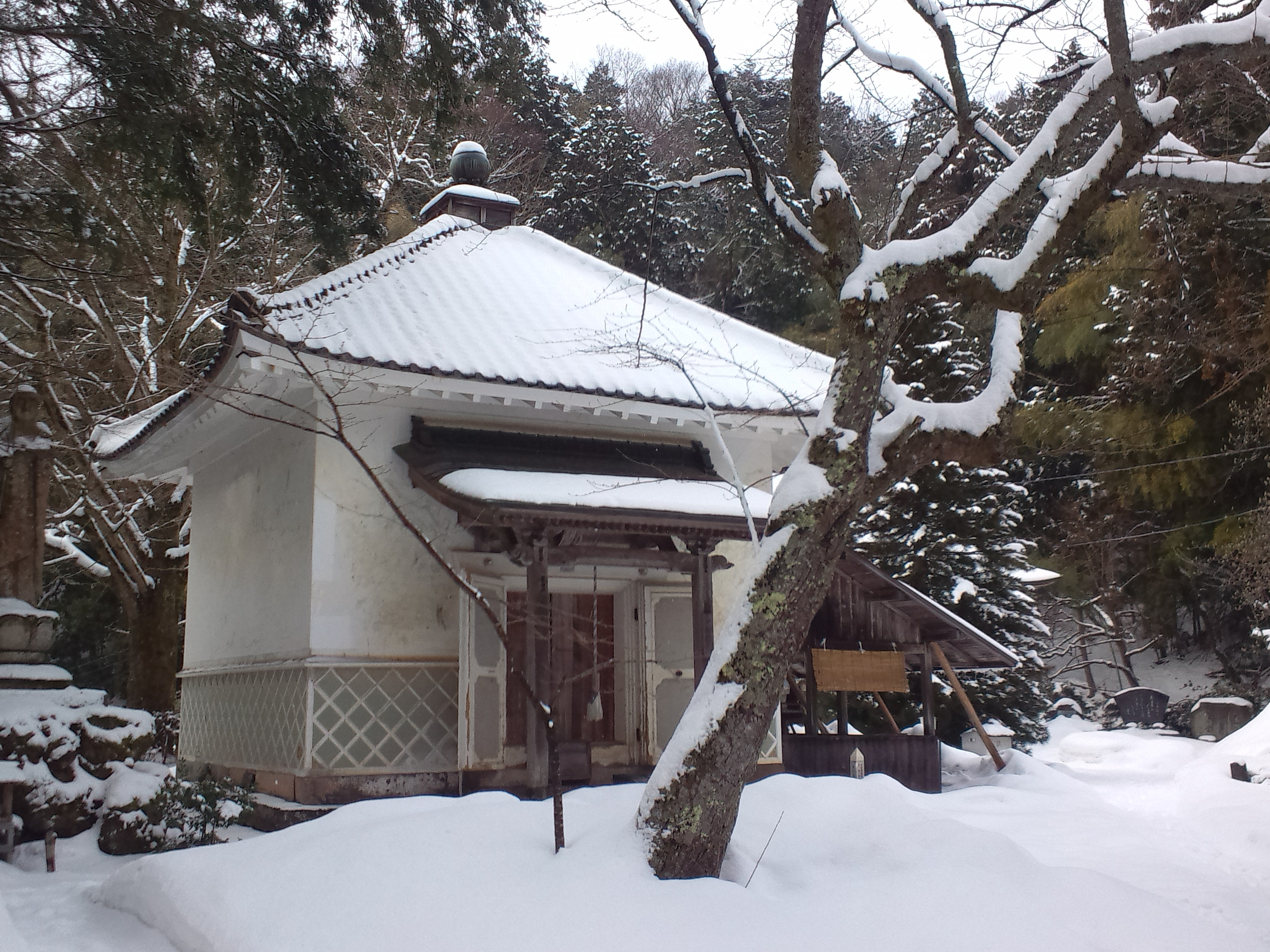
Kyōzō

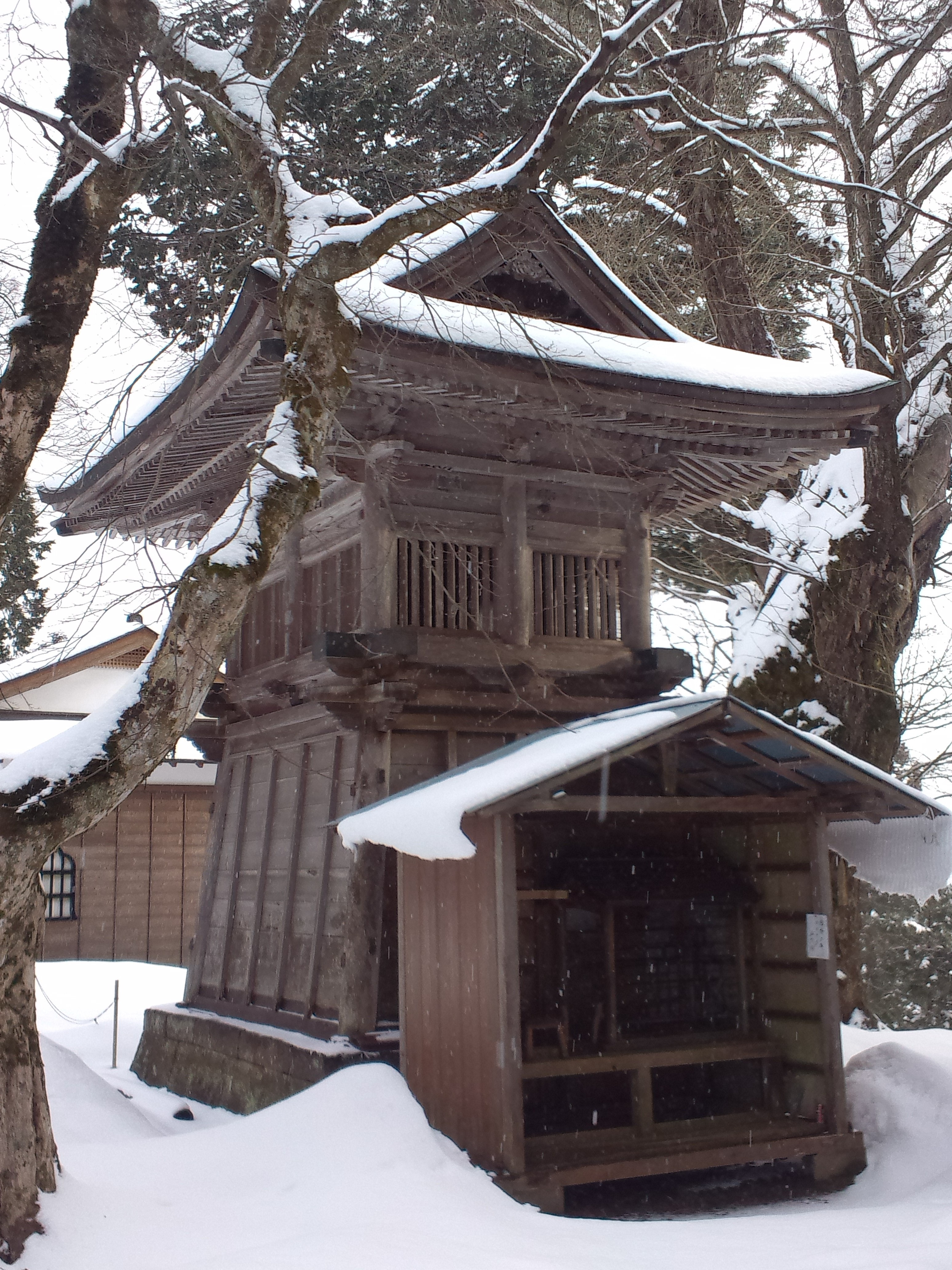
Shōrō

== Access ==
The temple is located approximately 10 minutes by car west of Matsunoodera Station on the JR West Obama Line.

== Honzon primary image ==
The honzon is a hibutsu hidden image of Batō Kannon Bosatsu It was open to the public from October 2008 to October 2009 to commemorate the 1000th anniversary of the death of cloistered Emperor Kazan, marking the first public viewing since 1931.

== Cultural Properties ==
=== National Treasures ===
- Colored silk painting of Fugen Enmei (絹本著色普賢延命像), Heian period (12th century), said to have been owned by Fujiwara no Nariko.

=== National Important Cultural Properties ===
- Wooden statue of seated Amida Nyorai (木造阿弥陀如来坐像), Kamakura period; attributed to Kaikei
- Colored silk painting of Kujaku Myōō (絹本著色孔雀明王像). Kamakura period.
- Colored silk painting of Lotus Mandala (絹本著色法華曼荼羅図). Kamakura period.
- Colored silk painting of Nyōirin Kannon (絹本著色如意輪観音像),Kamakura period (1307); by Yishan Yining
- Colored silk painting of Zhongnan Mountains Mandala (絹本著色終南山曼荼羅図), Kamakura period.

=== Important Intangible Folk Cultural Property ===
- Matsunoo-dera Hotokemai (松尾寺の仏舞).

=== Kyoto Prefecture Tangible Cultural Properties ===
- Matsunoo-dera Hondō (本堂), Edo period
- Matsunoo-dera Kyōzō (経蔵), Edo period
- Matsunoo-dera Niōmon (仁王門), Edo period
- Colored silking painting of Amida Triad (絹本著色阿弥陀三尊像), Goryeo (late 13th to early 14th century)
- Announcement of the restoration of Matsunoo-dera (松尾寺再興啓白文), Kamakura period with Origin of the Saigoku Thirty-three Temples Pilgrimage (西国三十三所巡礼縁起), Muromachi period
- Colored silk painting of Aizen Myōō (絹本著色愛染明王像), Kamakura period
- Colored silk painting of Yakushi Nyorai and Twelve Heavenly Generals (絹絹本著色薬師十二神将像), Kamakura period

=== Maizuru City Tangible Cultural Properties ===
- Wooden seated statue of Jizō Bosatsu (地蔵菩薩坐像), Kamakura period
- Wooden standing statues of Niō (金剛力士像二体), Kamakura period
- Map of Matsunoo-dera precincts (松尾寺伽藍落慶式古図), Muromachi period

=== Maizuru City Places of Scenic Beauty ===
- Matsunoo-dera gardens (松尾寺庭園), Muromachi period

== See also ==
List of National Treasures of Japan (paintings)
