= Mitsumatsu Station (Fukui) =

Railway station in Takahama, Fukui Prefecture, Japan

Mitsumatsu Station 三松駅
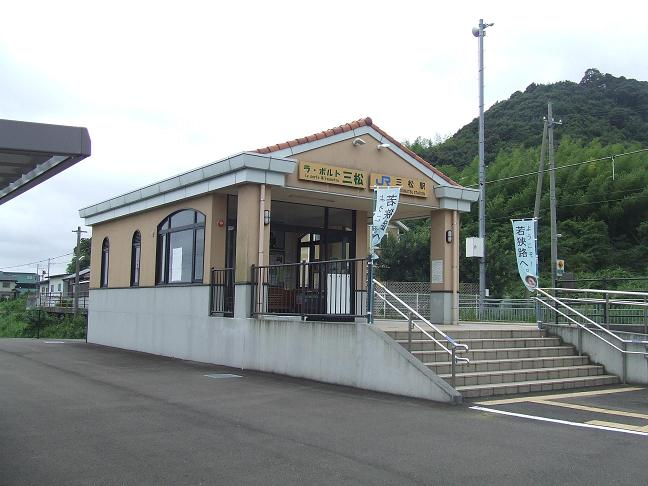
- Mitsumatsu Station in August 2009

General information
- Location: 13-12 Higashimitsumatsu, Takahama-cho, Ōi-gun, Fukui-ken 919-2382; Japan
- Coordinates: 35.4888°N 135.5203°E
- Distance: 71.4 km from Tsuruga
- Platforms: 1 side platform
- Tracks: 1

Other information
- Status: Unstaffed
- Website: Official website

History
- Opened: 15 July 1961

Passengers
- FY 2023: 150 daily
Location
- Location within Japan

Mitsumatsu Station (三松駅, Mitsumatsu-eki) is a railway station in the town of Takahama, Ōi District, Fukui Prefecture, Japan, operated by West Japan Railway Company (JR West).

== Lines ==
Mitsumatsu Station is served by the Obama Line, and is located 71.4 kilometers from the terminus of the line at Tsuruga.

== Station layout ==
The station consists of one side platform serving a single bi-directional track. The station is unattended.

== Adjacent stations ==
«	Service	»
Obama Line
Wakasa-Takahama	-	Aonogō

== History ==
Mitsumatsu Station was opened on 15 July 1961. With the privatization of Japanese National Railways (JNR) on 1 April 1987, the station came under the control of JR West.

== Passenger statistics ==
In fiscal 2016, the station was used by an average of 87 passengers daily (boarding passengers only).

== Surrounding area ==
- National Route 27

== See also ==
- List of railway stations in Japan
