= Takahama, Fukui =

Town in Ōi district, Fukui prefecture, Japan

Takahama 高浜町
- Town
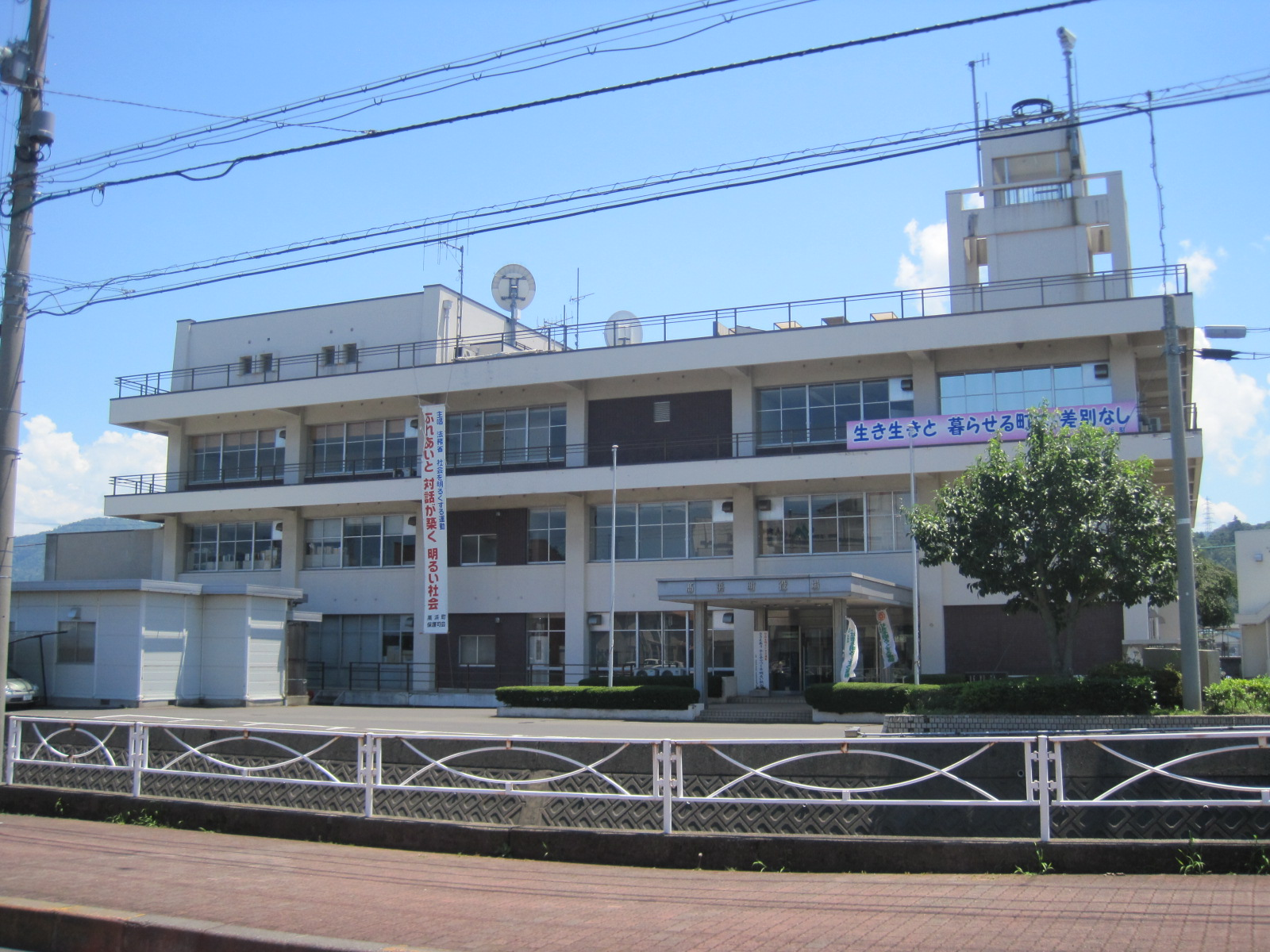
- Takahama Town Hall

- Flag Seal

- Location of Takahama in Fukui Prefecture

- Coordinates: 35°29′25.2″N 135°33′3.5″E
- Country: Japan
- Region: Chūbu (Hokuriku)
- Prefecture: Fukui
- District: Ōi

Area
  - Total: 72.40 km^{2} (27.95 sq mi)

Population (June 2018)
  - Total: 10,490
  - Density: 144.9/km^{2} (375.3/sq mi)
- Time zone: UTC+9 (Japan Standard Time)
- City symbols
- -Tree: Eucommia ulmoides
- -Flower: Rosa rugosa
- Phone number: 0770-32-1111
- Address: 71-7-1 Miyazaki, Takahama-cho, Ōi-gun, Fukui-ken 919-2292
- Website: www.town.takahama.fukui.jp

Takahama (高浜町, Takahama-chō) is a town in Fukui Prefecture, Japan. As of 1 June 2018, the town had an estimated population of 10,490 in 4,278 households, with a population density of 63 persons per km^{2}. The total area of the town is 72.40 square kilometres (27.95 sq mi).

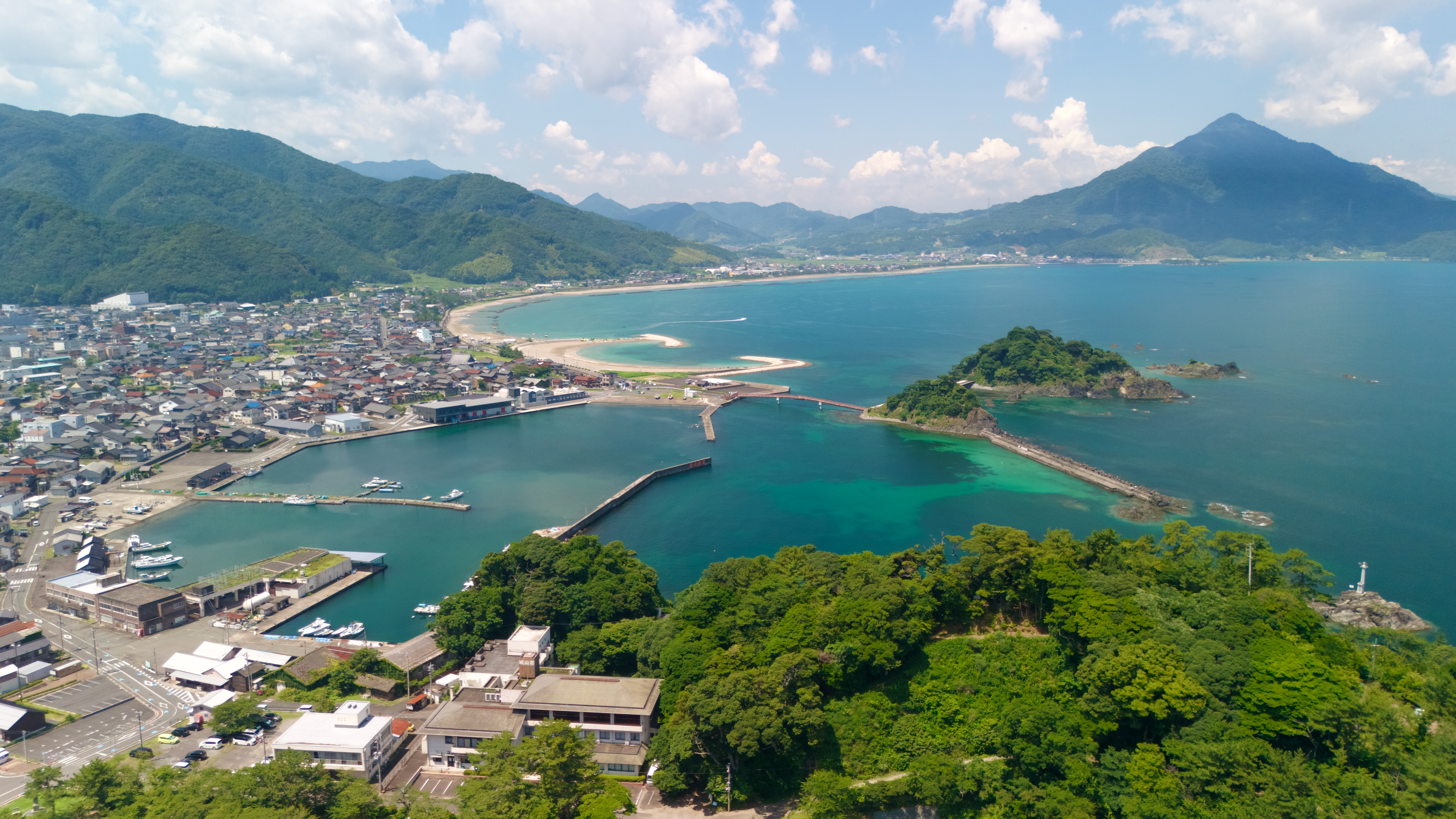
Mount Aoba and the port of Takahama, viewed from the coastline

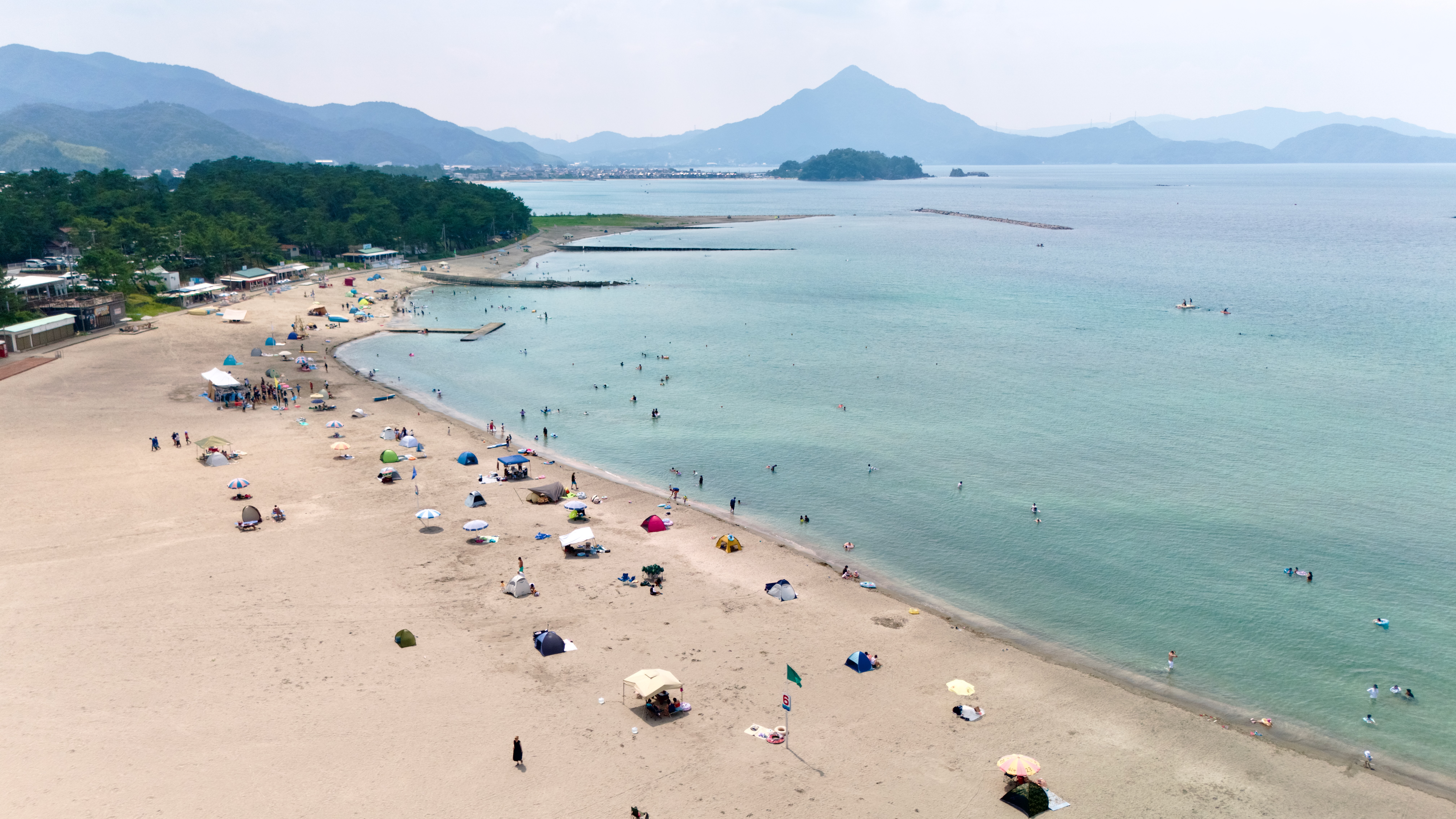
Wada Beach, Takahama

== Geography ==
Takahama is located in the far southwestern corner of Fukui Prefecture, bordered by Kyoto Prefecture to the west and the heavily indented ria coast of Wakasa Bay of Sea of Japan to the north. Parts of the town are within the borders of the Wakasa Wan Quasi-National Park.

=== Neighbouring municipalities ===
- Fukui Prefecture
  - Ōi
- Kyoto Prefecture
  - Ayabe
  - Maizuru

=== Climate ===
Takahama has a humid subtropical climate (Köppen Cfa) characterized by warm, wet summers and cold winters with heavy snowfall. The average annual temperature in Takahama is 14.8 °C. The average annual rainfall is 1930 mm with September as the wettest month. The temperatures are highest on average in August, at around 27.3 °C, and lowest in January, at around 3.7 °C.

== Demographics ==
Per Japanese census data, the population of Takahama has declined slightly over the past 30 years.

Historical population
Year	Pop.	±%
1970	10,841	—
1980	11,818	+9.0%
1990	12,425	+5.1%
2000	12,119	−2.5%
2010	11,062	−8.7%
2020	10,326	−6.7%

== History ==
Takahama is part of ancient Wakasa Province. During the Edo period, the area was part of the holdings of Obama Domain. Following the Meiji restoration, it was organised into part of Ōi District in Fukui Prefecture. With the establishment of the modern municipalities system on April 1, 1889, the village of Takahama was established. Takahama was elevated to town status on April 1, 1912. On February 11, 1955, Takahama annexed the neighbouring villages of Aonogō, Wada and Uchiura.

== Economy ==
The economy of Takahama, previously dependent on commercial fishing and agriculture is now very heavily dependent on the nuclear power industry. The partial closure of the Takahama Nuclear Power Plant since the 2011 Fukushima Nuclear Disaster has adversely affected the local economy.

== Education ==
Takahama has four public elementary schools and one public middle school operated by the town government. The town does not have a high school.

== Transportation ==
=== Railway ===
- JR West - Obama Line
  - Wakasa-Wada, Wakasa-Takahama, Mitsumatsu, Aonogō

=== Highway ===
- National Route 27

== International relations ==
- (South Korea) Boryeong, South Chungcheong, Korea, friendship city since November 3, 1990
