= Awano Station =

Railway station in Tsuruga, Fukui Prefecture, Japan

Awano Station 粟野駅
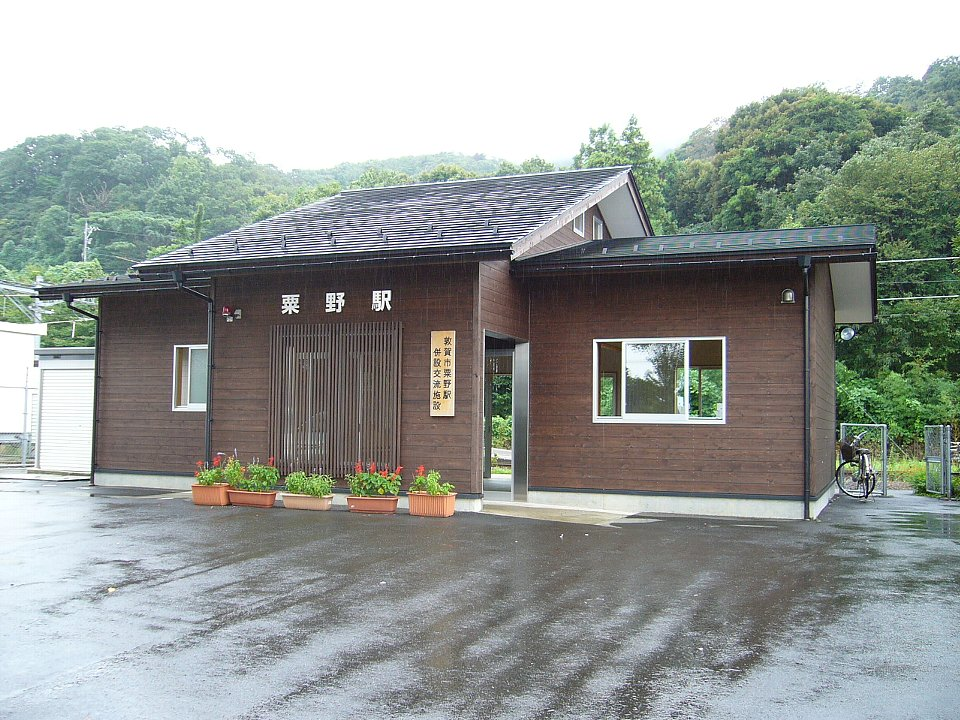
- Awano Station in September 2006

General information
- Location: Nosaka, Tsuruga City, Fukui Prefecture 914-0145; Japan
- Coordinates: 35.6171°N 136.0272°E
- Operator: JR West
- Line: Obama Line
- Distance: 7.7 km (4.8 mi) from Tsuruga
- Platforms: 1 island platform
- Tracks: 2

Construction
- Structure type: At grade

Other information
- Status: Unstaffed
- Website: Official website

History
- Opened: 15 December 1917; 108 years ago

Passengers
- FY 2023: 108 daily

Services
Preceding station	JR West	Following station
Higashi-Mihama towards Higashi-Maizuru	Obama Line Local	Nishi-Tsuruga towards Tsuruga
Location
- Location within Fukui Prefecture Location within Kansai region Location within Japan

Awano Station (粟野駅, Awano-eki) is a railway station in the city of Tsuruga, Fukui Prefecture, Japan, operated by West Japan Railway Company (JR West).

== Lines ==
Awano Station is served by the Obama Line, and is located 7.7 kilometers from the terminus of the line at Tsuruga.

== Station layout ==
The station consists of one island platform connected to the station building by a level crossing. The station is unattended.

=== Platforms ===
1	Obama Line	for Tsuruga
2	Obama Line	for Obama and Higashi-Maizuru

== History ==
Awano Station opened on 15 December 1917. With the privatization of Japanese National Railways (JNR) on 1 April 1987, the station came under the control of JR West.

== Passenger statistics ==
In fiscal 2016, the station was used by an average of 66 passengers daily (boarding passengers only).

== Surrounding area ==
- Tsuruga National Medical Center

== See also ==
- List of railway stations in Japan
