= Wakasa-Hongō Station =

Railway station in Ōi, Fukui Prefecture, Japan

Wakasa-Hongō Station 若狭本郷駅
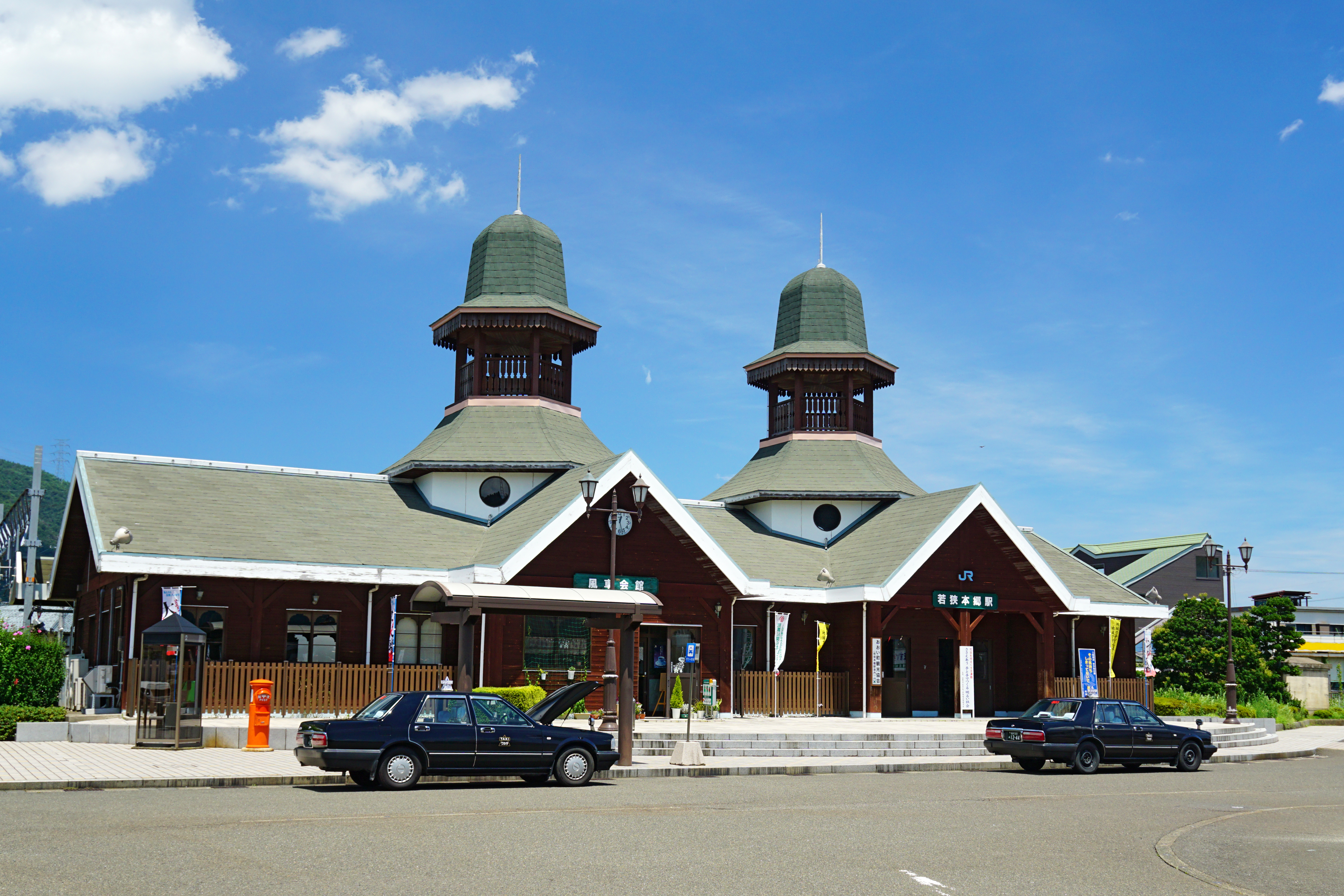
- Wakasa-Hongō Station in July 2015

General information
- Location: 153-1 Hongō, Ōi-chō, Ōi-gun, Fukui-ken 919-2111; Japan
- Coordinates: 35.4828°N 135.6187°E
- Distance: 61.8 km from Tsuruga
- Platforms: 2 side platforms
- Tracks: 1

Other information
- Status: Staffed (Midori no Madoguchi)
- Website: Official website

History
- Opened: 3 April 1921

Passengers
- FY 2023: 462 daily
Location
- Location within Japan

Wakasa-Hongō Station (若狭本郷駅, Wakasa-Hongō-eki) is a railway station in the town of Ōi, Ōi District, Fukui Prefecture, Japan, operated by West Japan Railway Company (JR West).

== Lines ==
Wakasa-Hongō Station is served by the Obama Line, and is located 61.8 kilometers from the terminus of the line at Tsuruga.

== Station layout ==
The station consists of two opposed side platforms connected by a footbridge. The station has a Midori no Madoguchi staffed ticket office.

=== Platforms ===
1	■ Obama Line	for Obama and Tsuruga
2	■ Obama Line	for Higashi-Maizuru

== Adjacent stations ==
«	Service	»
Obama Line
Kato	-	Wakasa-Wada

== History ==
Wakasa-Hongō Station opened on 3 April 1921. With the privatization of Japanese National Railways (JNR) on 1 April 1987, the station came under the control of JR West.

== Passenger statistics ==
In fiscal 2016, the station was used by an average of 313 passengers daily (boarding passengers only).

== Surrounding area ==
The station is located about 485 metres (1,591 ft) to the west of Aoto Bridge, which crosses the western arm of Obama Bay.

- National Route 27
- Ōi Town Hall

== See also ==
- List of railway stations in Japan
