= Nochiseyama Castle =

Japanese castle

- 後瀬山城
- Obama, Fukui Prefecture, Japan
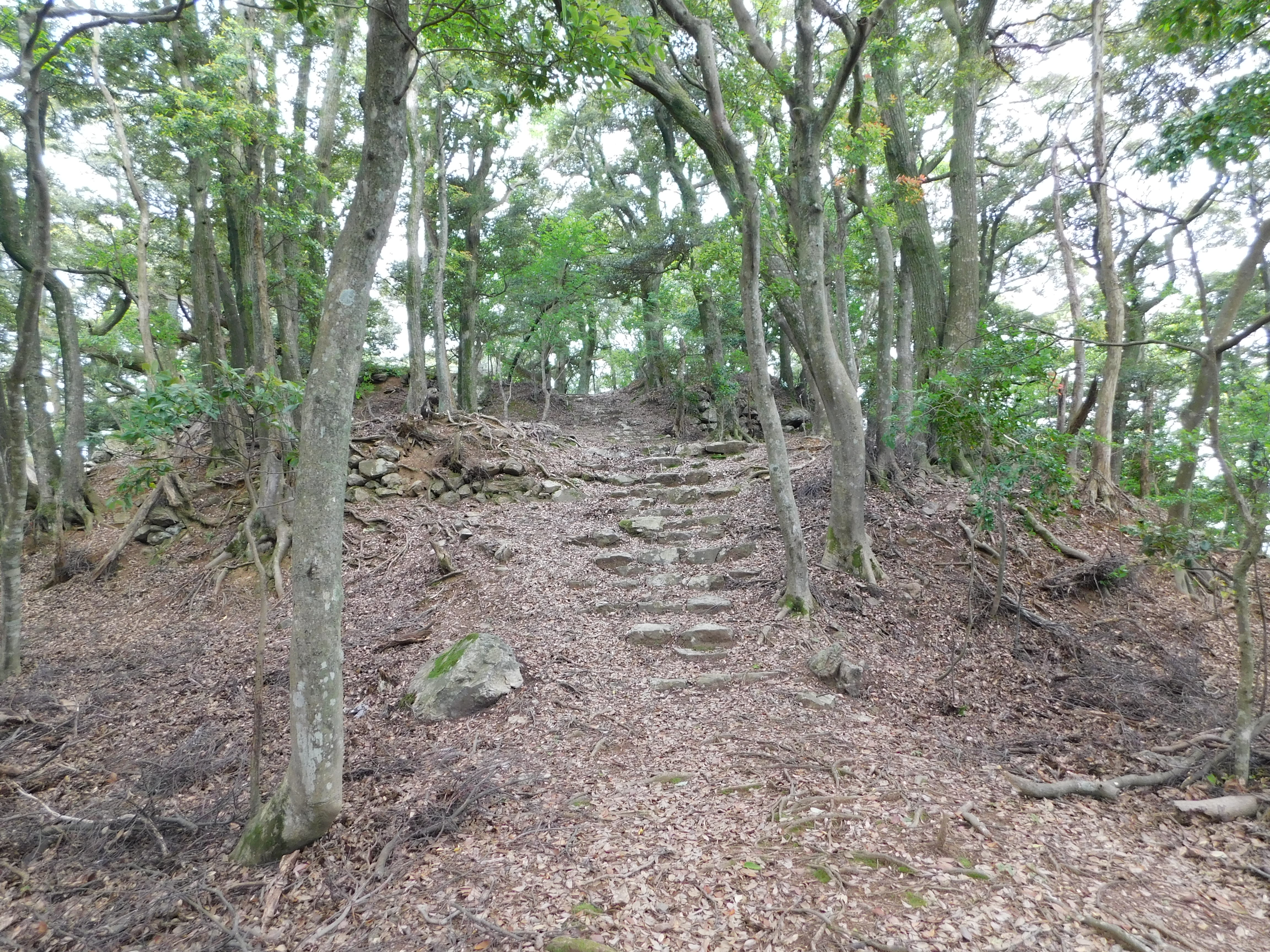
- site of the Honmaru of Nochiseyama Castle

Site information
- Type: yamashiro-style Japanese castle
- Open to the public: yes
- Condition: ruins

Location
- Coordinates: 35°29′17.52″N 135°44′20.63″E

Site history
- Built: 1522
- Built by: Takeda Motomitsu
- In use: Muromachi to Sengoku periods
- Demolished: unknown

Nochiseyama Castle (後瀬山城, Nochiseyama-jō) was a Sengoku period yamashiro-style Japanese castle located in what is now part of the city of Obama, Fukui Prefecture in the Hokuriku region of Honshu, Japan. The ruins have been protected as a National Historic Site since 1997.

== Background ==
Nochiseyama Castle is located on a 160-meter hill located next to the Tango-kaidō highway, at the southeast edge of what is now central Obama city. Obama prospered as a port Wakasa Bay connecting to Kyoto from before the Heian period, and the Tango-kaidō was the primary route from the port to Kyoto and the Kansai region.

== History ==
A cadet branch of the Takeda clan from Kai Province gained control of Wakasa Province during the Muromachi Period, but were based in Kyoto and ruled in absentia. They were heavily involved in the politics of the Onin War and were noted supporters of the Ashikaga shogunate. In 1522, Takeda Motomitsu, the fifth generation shugo of Wakasa decided relocate from the war-ravaged Kyoto to his domain in Wakasa and began construction of the castle, which would eventually extend 500 meters from north-to-south, with a palace at the foot of the mountain. The Takeda has close relations with the court nobility and men of arts in Kyoto, and invited many persons of culture to Wakasa as a refuge from the ongoing wars. However, this interlude was short. By the 1550s there was a major succession dispute within the Takeda clan, during which time a faction led by Takeda Motoaki (1562-1582) sought the assistance of the powerful Asakura clan from neighbouring Echizen Province. Motoaki was installed as the 9th Lord of Wakasa at the head of an Asakura army, and was then taken as a hostage to the Asakura stronghold of Ichijōdani, and Wakasa was thereafter ruled by Asakura proxies.

In 1573, Oda Nobunaga destroyed the Asakura clan; however, Motoaki was not returned in Wakasa. Instead, Nobunaga's general Niwa Nagahide was awarded the province. Niwa Nagahide was instrumental in the construction of Nobunaga's Azuchi Castle in 1576, and through this experience, greatly expanded upon and improved the defences of Nochiseyama Castle. The central areas at the top of the peak were surrounded by stone walls with huge stones, and a large palace was built at this area. The ramparts of the numerous enclosures on the mountain were also reinforced with stone and with dry moats.

Following Nobunaga's assassination, Niwa Nagahide continued to serve Toyotomi Hideyoshi. However, upon his death, Hideyoshi dispossessed his son and heir, and assigned the castle to Asano Nagamasa (1587-1593) followed by Kinoshita Katsutoshi (1593-1600). After the Battle of Sekigahara in 1600, Kyōgoku Takatsugu was made daimyō of Obama Domain by the Tokugawa shogunate. Within a year, he decided to relocate and construct a new castle, Obama Castle, at the river delta of the Kitagawa and Minamigawa to better control the town and port areas. However, the new castle took so long to construct that he was transferred to Izumo Province before it was finished. Obama Castle was eventually completed by the Sakai clan, and Nochiseyama castle was then abandoned.

== Current situation ==
All of the structures of Nochiseyama Castle have long been lost; however, some of the stone walls of the inner bailey remain at the top of the mountain, which has numerous marked hiking trails. The summit of the mountain is now occupied by a Shinto shrine, which was built in the Edo period. As the result of an archaeological excavation in 1988, the foundation stones of the palace at the base of the mountain, which occupied an area of 110 meters east-to-west by 120 meters north-to-south, were uncovered. The ruins are located about 300 meters from Obama Station on the JR West Obama Line, and it is about a 20-minute walk from the base of the mountain to the summit.

== Gallery ==
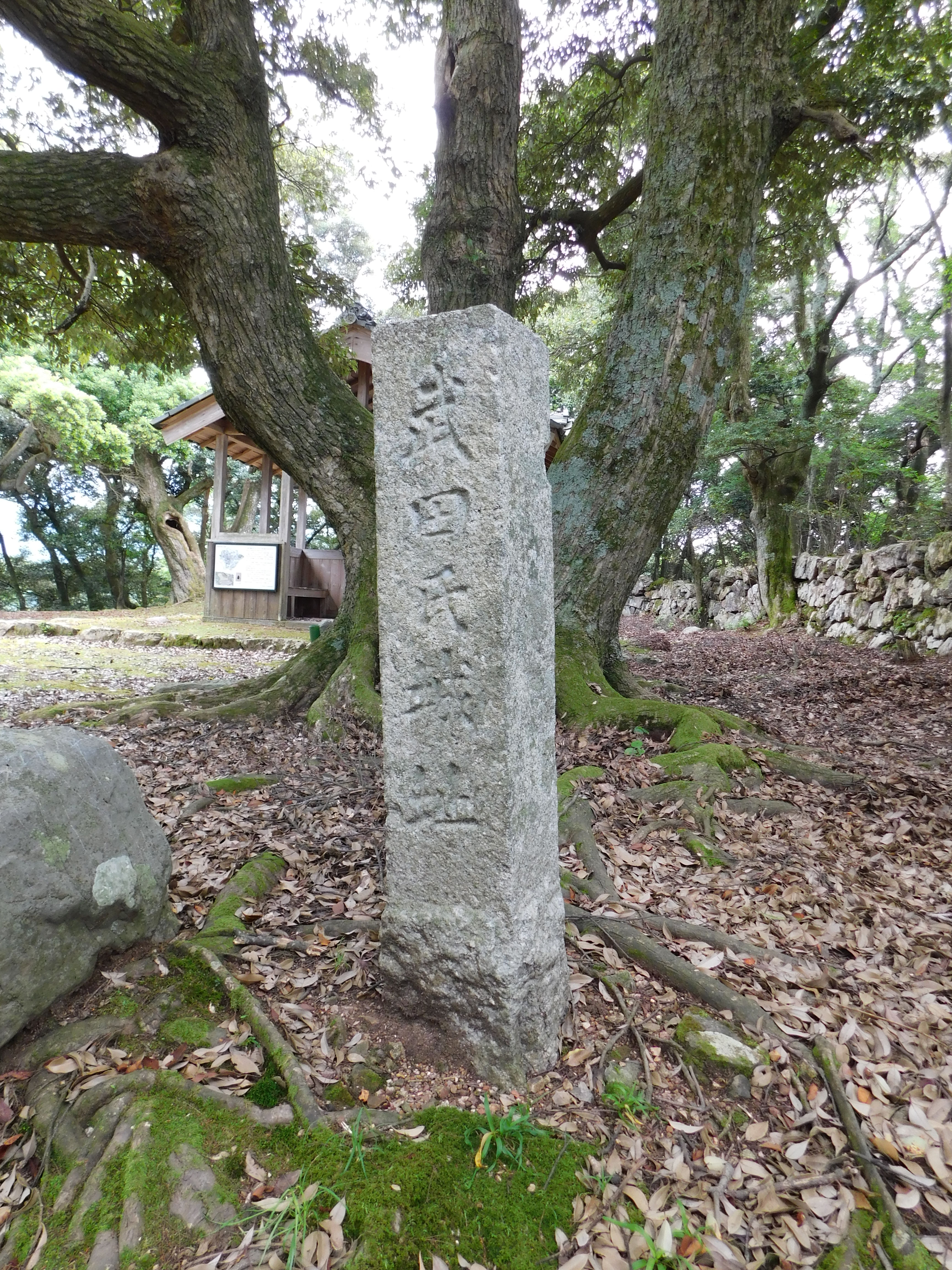
Monument marking the site of the inner bailey

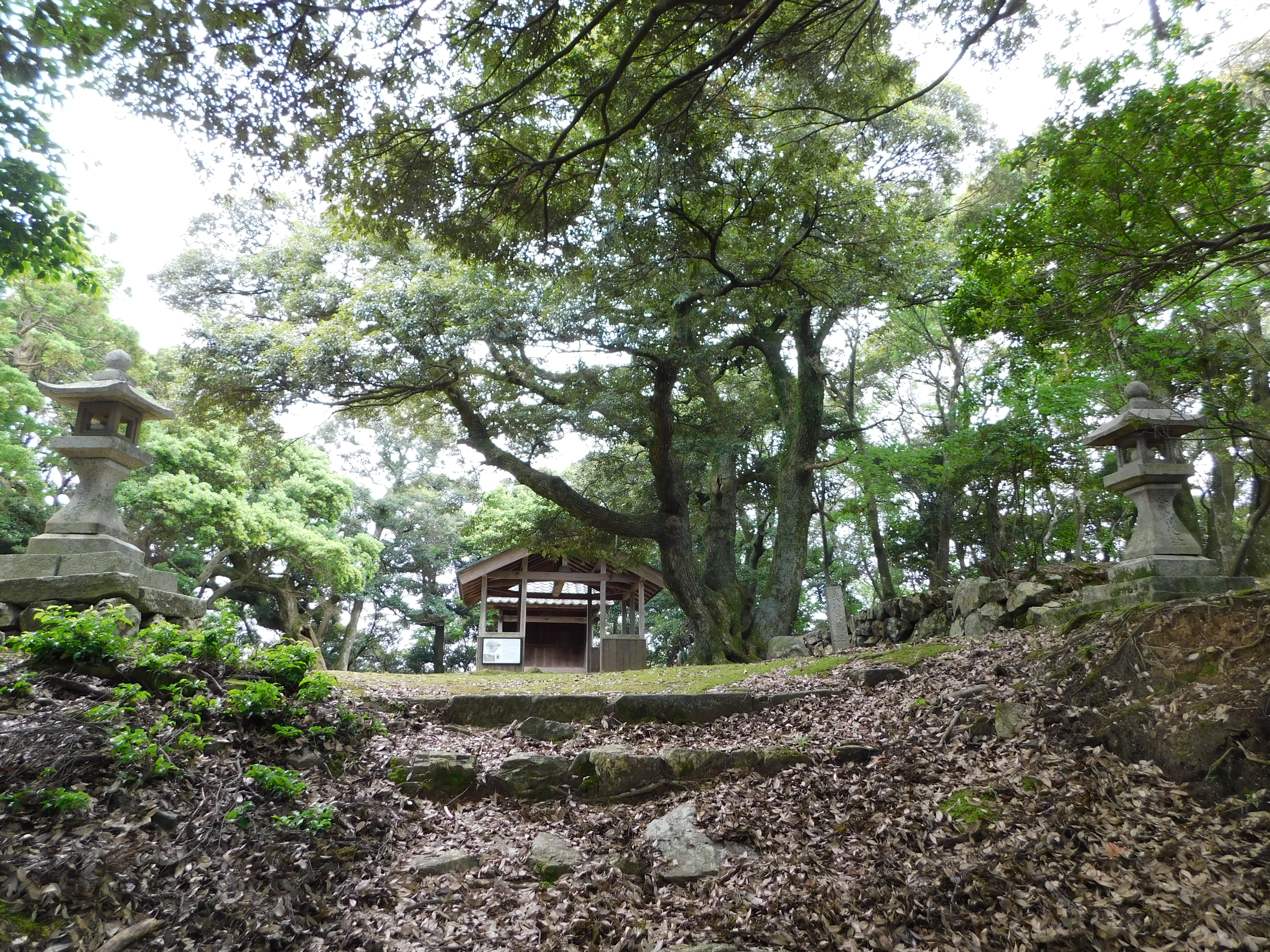
Atago Jinja

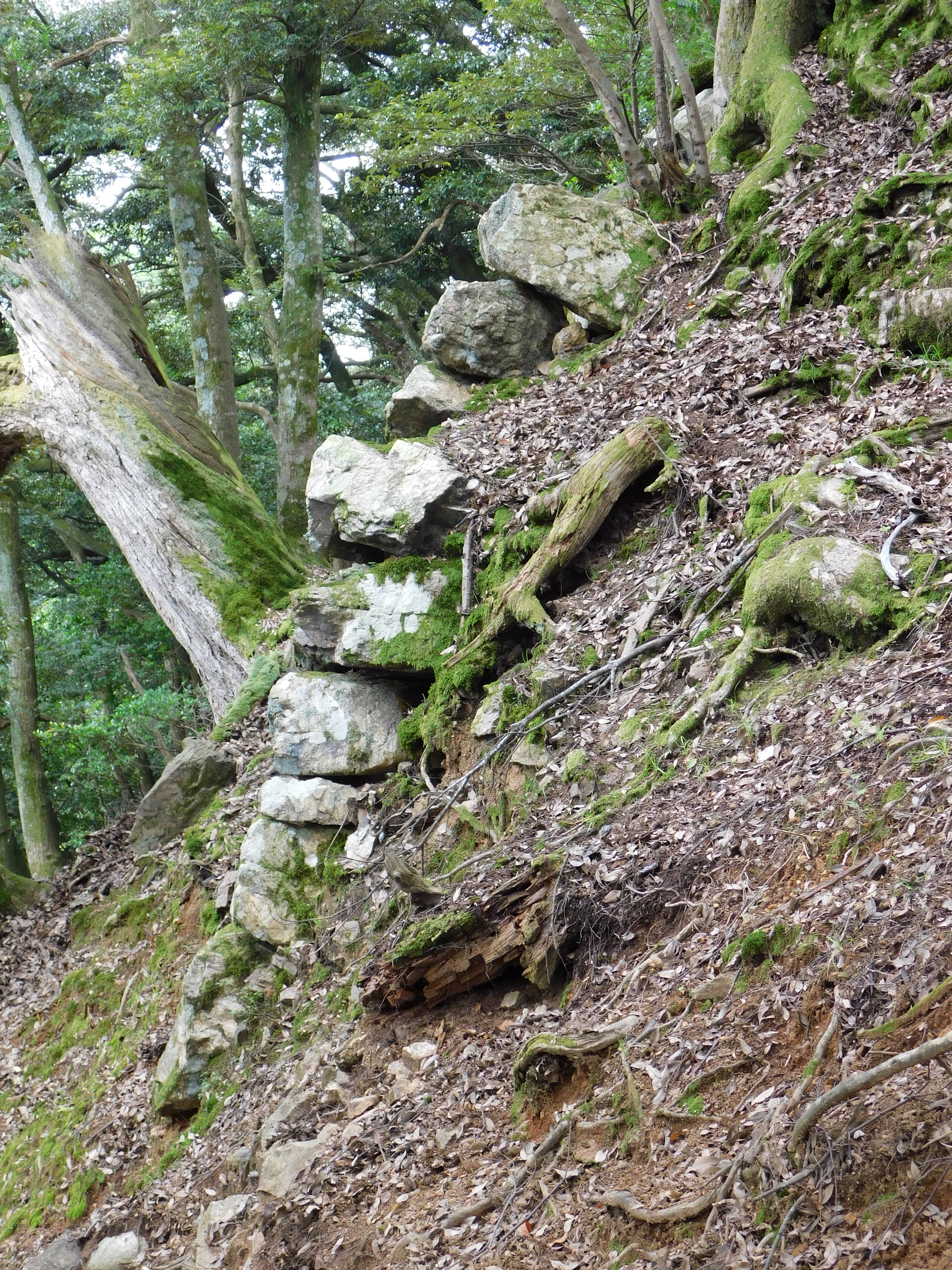
Remnants of walls of the inner bailey

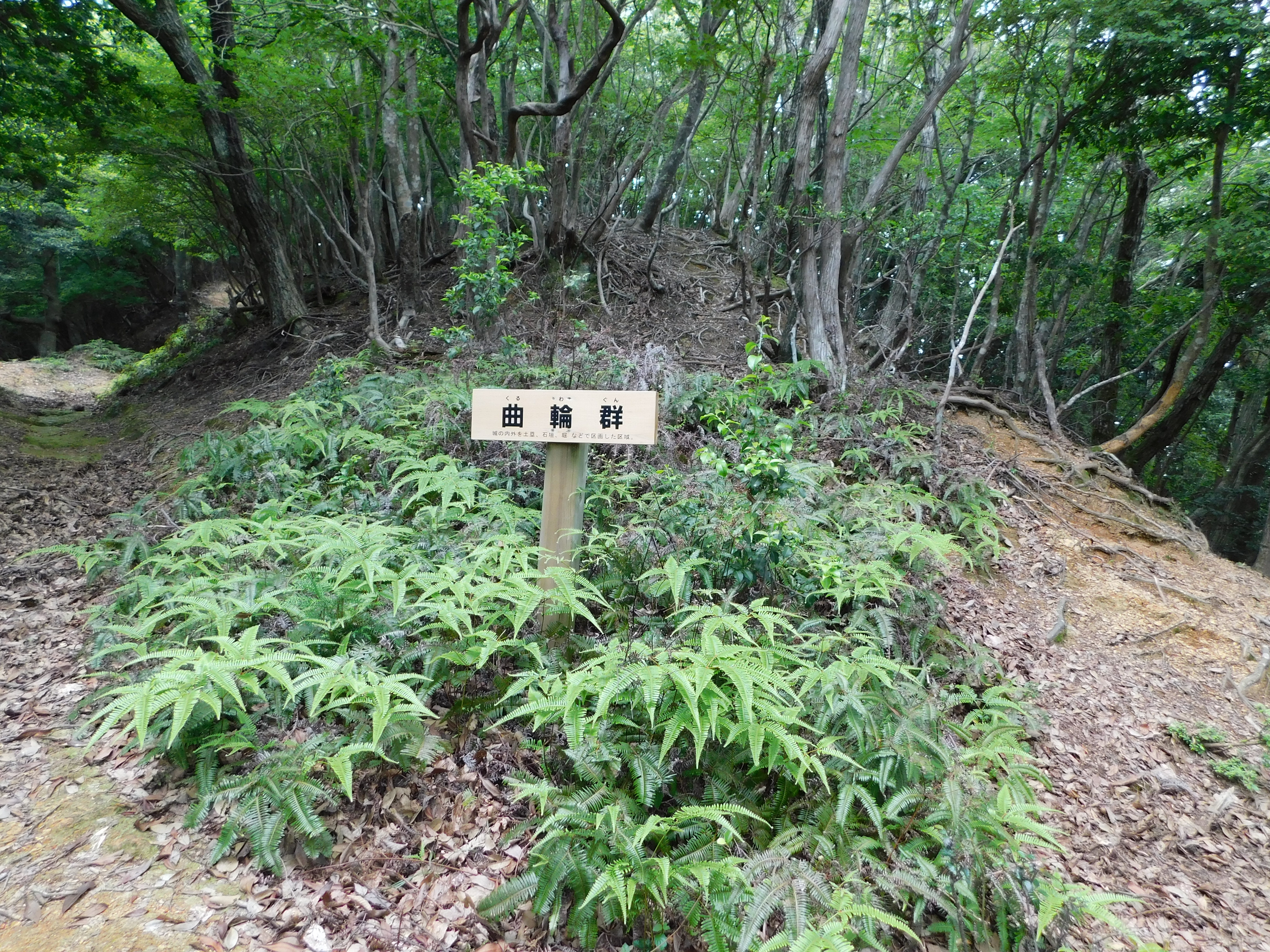
Remnants of kuruwa enclosures

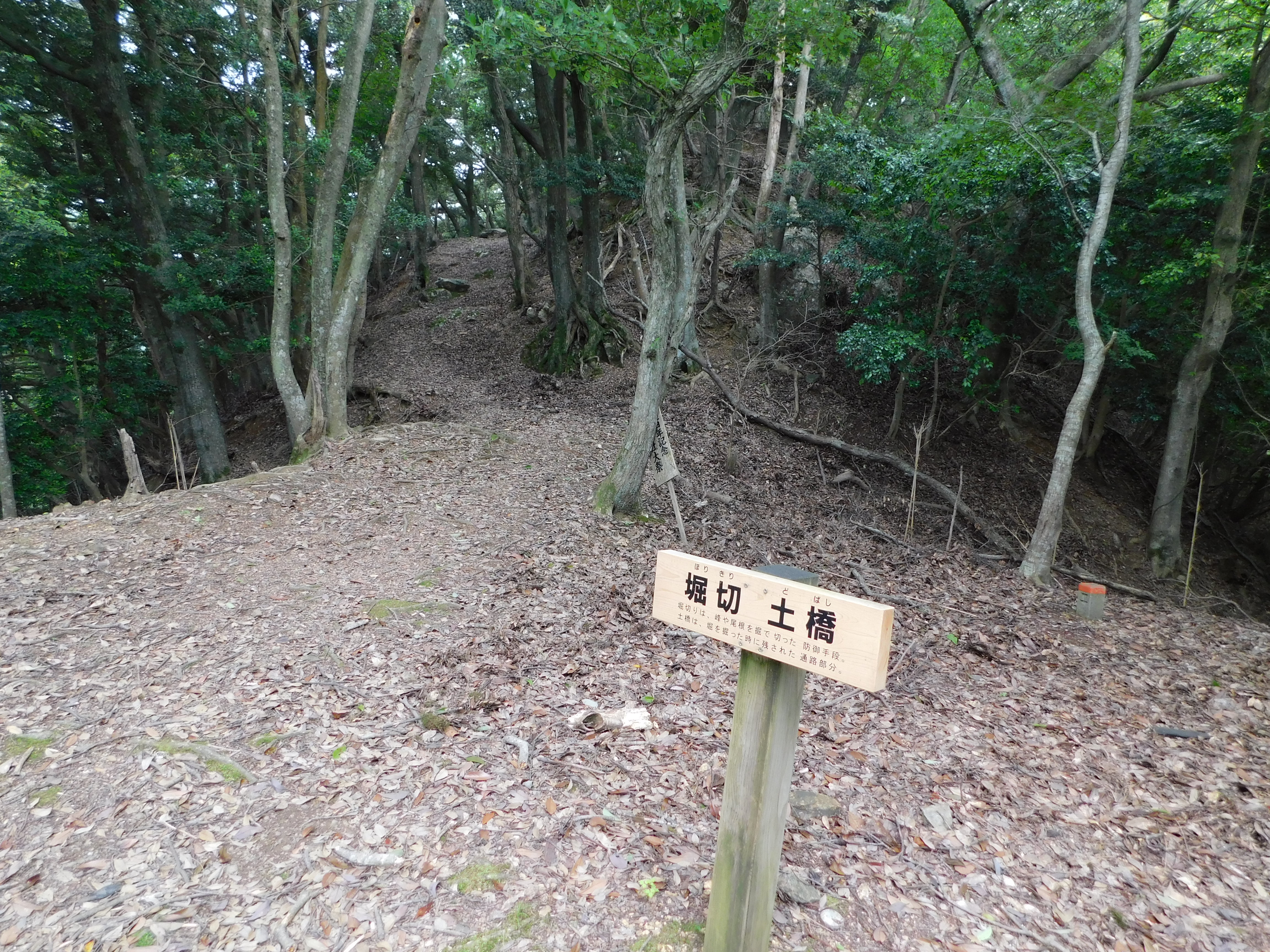
Remnants of moats

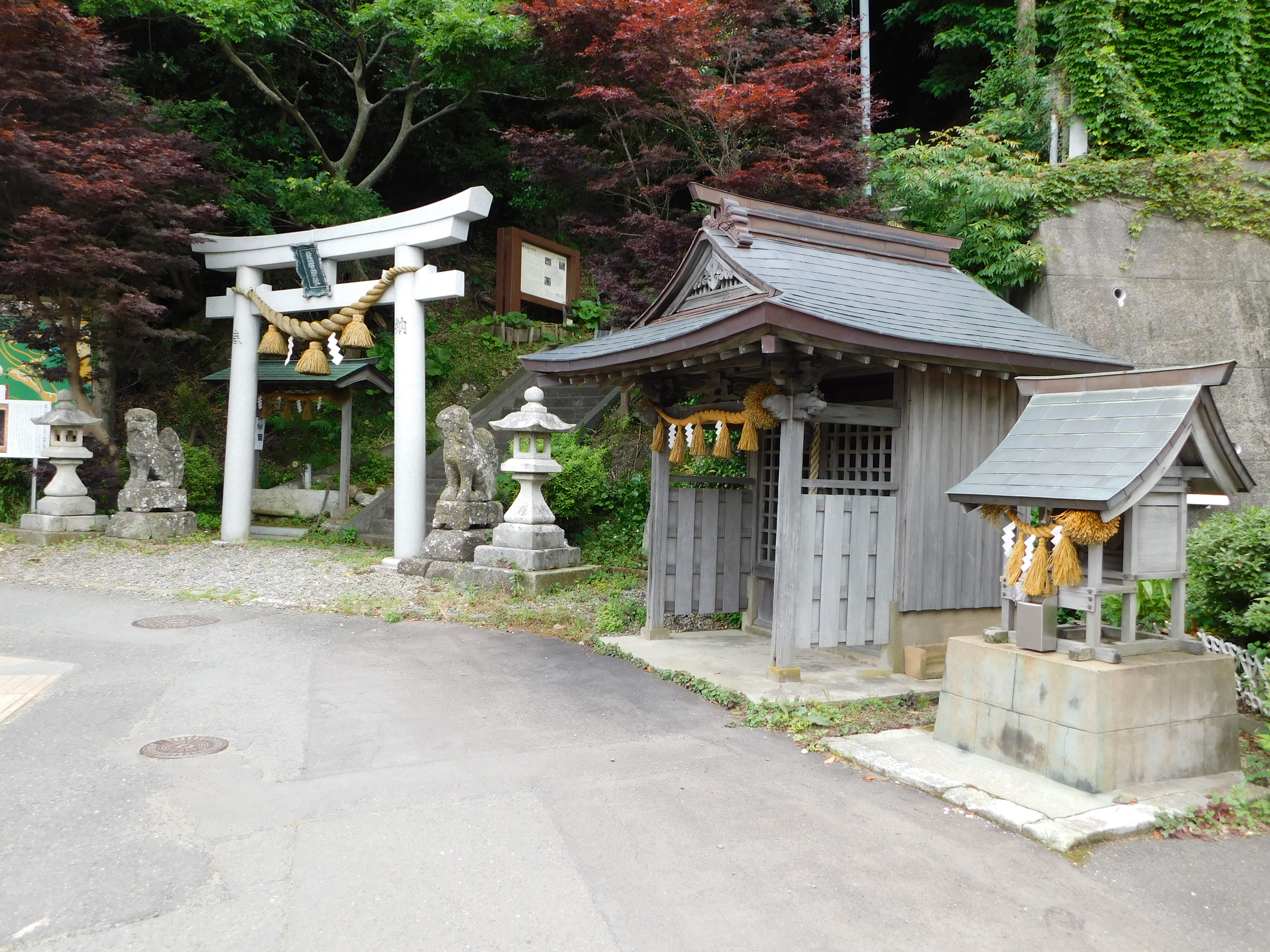
Hiking trail starting point

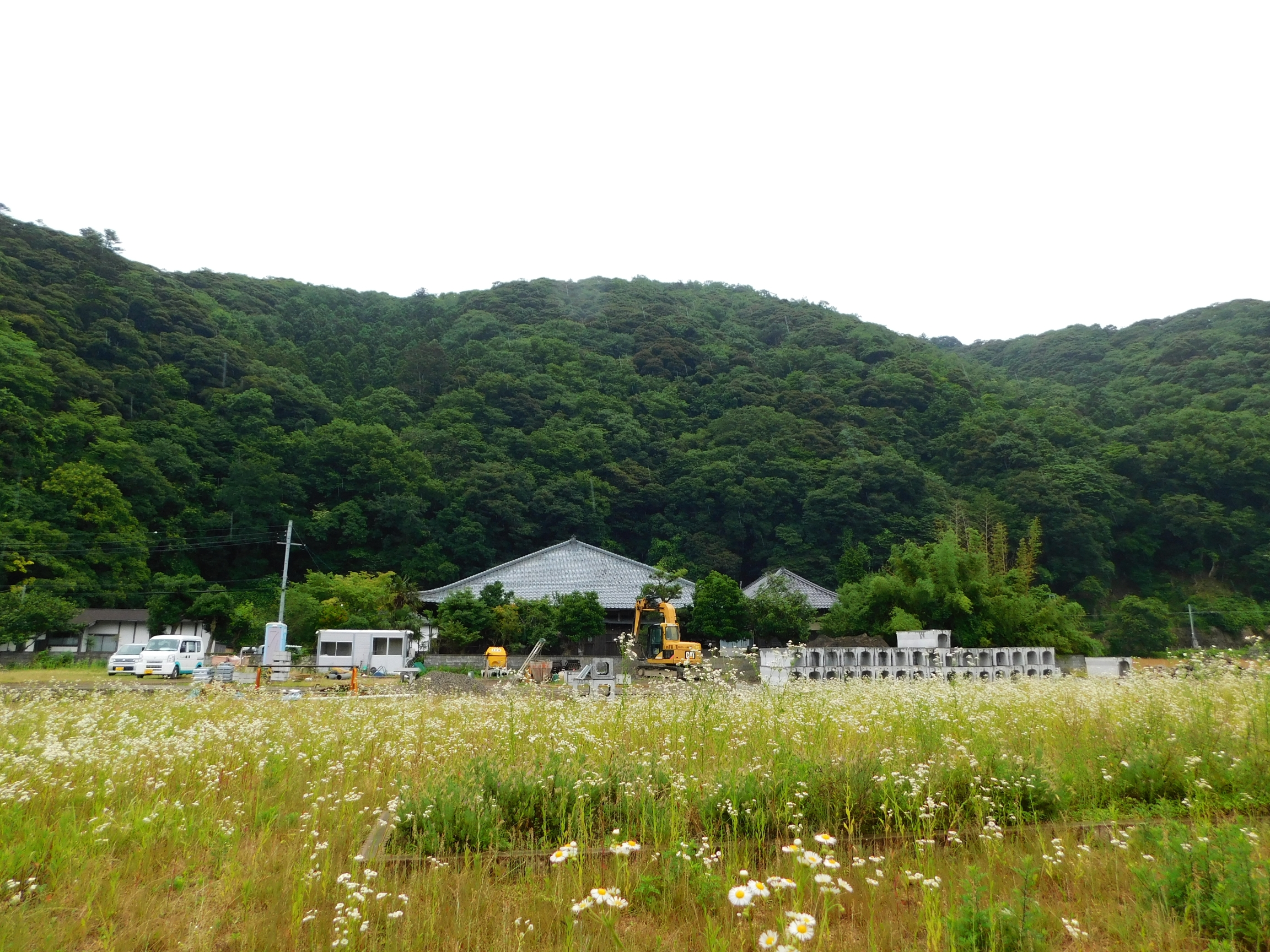
Site of the palace

== See also ==
- List of Historic Sites of Japan (Fukui)
