= Seihama Station =

Railway station in Obama, Fukui Prefecture, Japan

Seihama Station 勢浜駅
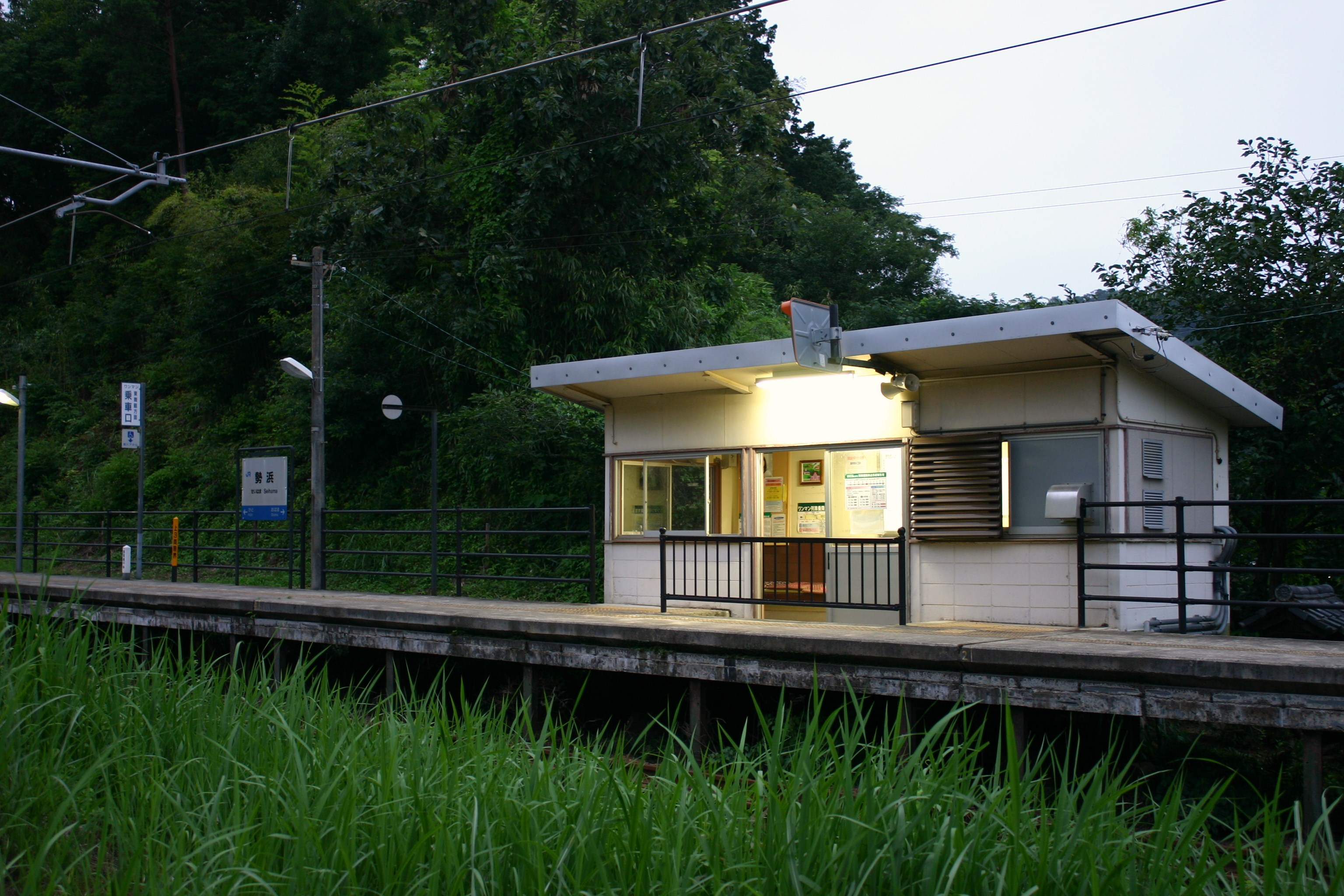
- Seihama Station in August 2009

General information
- Location: 67-16, Nishisei, Obama-shi Fukui-ken; Japan
- Coordinates: 35°28′52″N 135°42′30″E
- Operator: JR West
- Line: ■ Obama Line
- Distance: 53.2 km from Tsuruga
- Platforms: 1 side platform
- Tracks: 1

Other information
- Status: Unstaffed
- Website: Official website

History
- Opened: 15 July 1961

Passengers
- FY 2023: 50 daily
Location
- Location within Japan

Seihama Station (勢浜駅, Seihama-eki) is a railway station in the city of Obama, Fukui Prefecture, Japan, operated by West Japan Railway Company (JR West).

== Lines ==
Seihama Station is served by the Obama Line, and is located 53.2 kilometers from the terminus of the line at Tsuruga.

== Station layout ==
The station consists of one side platform serving a single bi-directional track. There is no station building, only a waiting room on the platform. The station is unattended.

== Adjacent stations ==
«	Service	»
Obama Line
Obama	-	Kato

== History ==
Shin-Hirano Station opened on 15 July 1961. With the privatization of Japanese National Railways (JNR) on 1 April 1987, the station came under the control of JR West. The station building was rebuilt in 1988.

== Passenger statistics ==
In fiscal 2016, the station was used by an average of 34 passengers daily (boarding passengers only).

== Surrounding area ==
- National Route 27

== See also ==
- List of railway stations in Japan
