= Wakasa-Takahama Station =

Railway station in Takahama, Fukui Prefecture, Japan

Wakasa-Takahama Station 若狭高浜駅
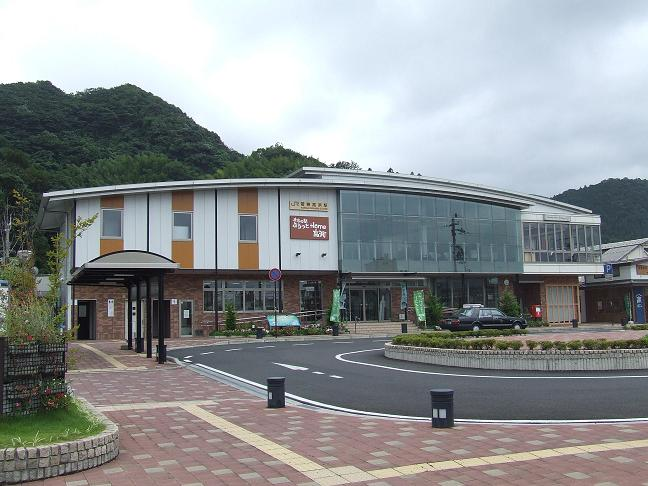
- Wakasa-Takahama Station in August 2009

General information
- Location: 77-2 Miyazaki, Takahama-cho, Ōi-gun, Fukui-ken 919-2225; Japan
- Coordinates: 35.4862°N 135.5476°E
- Operator: JR West
- Line: ■ Obama Line
- Distance: 68.9 km from Tsuruga
- Platforms: 2 side platforms
- Tracks: 2

Other information
- Status: Staffed (Midori no Madoguchi)
- Website: Official website

History
- Opened: 3 April 1921

Passengers
- FY 2023: 462 daily
Location
- Location within Japan

Wakasa-Takahama Station (若狭高浜駅, Wakasa-Takahama-eki) is a railway station in the town of Takahama, Ōi District, Fukui Prefecture, Japan, operated by West Japan Railway Company (JR West).

== Lines ==
Wakasa-Takahama Station is served by the Obama Line, and is located 68.9 kilometers from the terminus of the line at Tsuruga.

== Station layout ==
The station consists of two opposed side platforms connected by a footbridge. The station has a Midori no Madoguchi staffed ticket office.

=== Platforms ===
1	■ Obama Line	for Obama and Tsuruga
2	■ Obama Line	for Higashi-Maizuru

== Adjacent stations ==
«	Service	»
Obama Line
Wakasa-Wada	-	Mitsumatsu

== History ==
Wasasa-Takahama Station was opened on 3 April 1921. With the privatization of Japanese National Railways (JNR) on 1 April 1987, the station came under the control of JR West.

== Passenger statistics ==
In fiscal 2016, the station was used by an average of 325 passengers daily (boarding passengers only).

== Surrounding area ==
- Takahama Town Hall

== See also ==
- List of railway stations in Japan
