= Kato Station =

Railway station in Obama, Fukui Prefecture, Japan

Kato Station 加斗駅
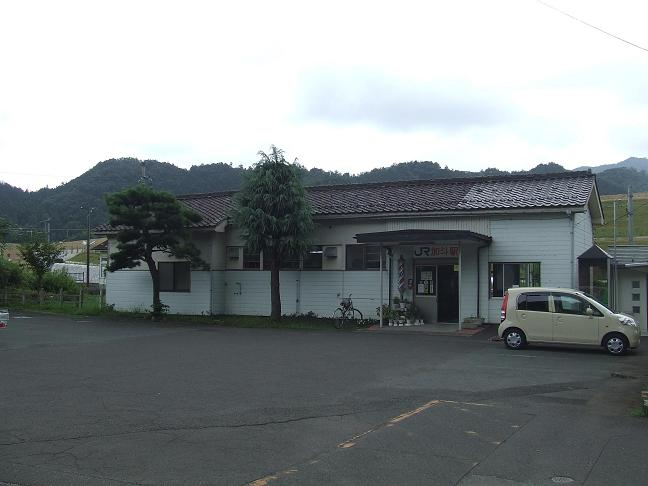
- Kato Station in August 2009

General information
- Location: 37-3 Kado, Obama-shi, Fukui-ken 917-0045; Japan
- Coordinates: 35.4808°N 135.6661°E
- Operator: JR West
- Line: ■ Obama Line
- Distance: 57.2 km from Tsuruga
- Platforms: 1 side platform
- Tracks: 1

Other information
- Status: Staffed
- Website: Official website

History
- Opened: 3 April 1921

Passengers
- FY 2023: 112 daily
Location
- Location within Japan

Kato Station (加斗駅, Kato-eki) is a railway station in the city of Obama, Fukui Prefecture, Japan, operated by West Japan Railway Company (JR West).

== Lines ==
Kato Station is served by the Obama Line, and is located 57.2 kilometers from the terminus of the line at Tsuruga.

== Station layout ==
The station consists of one side platform serving a single bi-directional track. The station is staffed.

== Adjacent stations ==
«	Service	»
Obama Line
Seihama	-	Wakasa-Hongō

== History ==
Kato Station opened on 3 April 1921. With the privatization of Japanese National Railways (JNR) on 1 April 1987, the station came under the control of JR West. The station building was rebuilt in 1995.

== Passenger statistics ==
In fiscal 2016, the station was used by an average of 76 passengers daily (boarding passengers only).

== Surrounding area ==
- National Route 27

== See also ==
- List of railway stations in Japan
