= Wakasa-Wada Station =

Railway station in Takahama, Fukui Prefecture, Japan

Wakasa-Wada Station 若狭和田駅
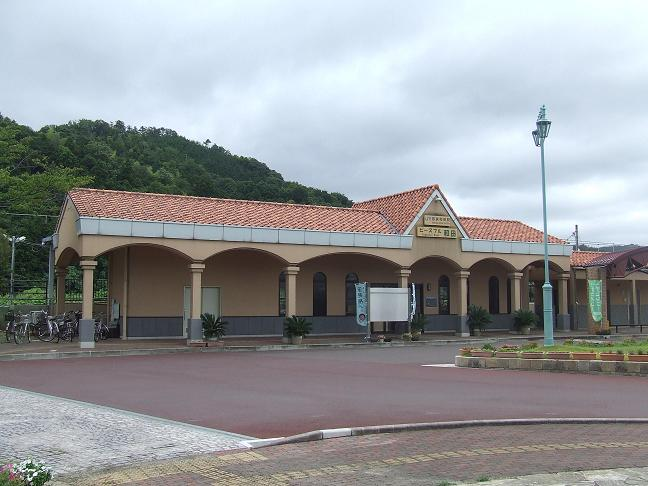
- Wakasa-Wada Station in August 2009

General information
- Location: 2-12 Wada, Takahama-cho, Ōi-gun, Fukui-ken 919-2201; Japan
- Coordinates: 35°29′20″N 135°34′52″E
- Operator: JR West
- Line: ■ Obama Line
- Distance: 65.7 km from Tsuruga
- Platforms: 1 side platform
- Tracks: 1

Other information
- Status: Staffed
- Website: Official website

History
- Opened: 1 June 1934

Passengers
- FY 2023: 196 daily
Location
- Location within Japan

Wakasa-Wada Station (若狭和田駅, Wakasa-Wada-eki) is a railway station in the town of Takahama, Ōi District, Fukui Prefecture, Japan, operated by West Japan Railway Company (JR West).

== Lines ==
Wakasa-Wada Station is served by the Obama Line, and is located 65.7 kilometers from the terminus of the line at Tsuruga.

== Station layout ==
The station consists of one side platform serving a single bi-directional track. The station is staffed.

== Adjacent stations ==
«	Service	»
Obama Line
Wakasa-Hongō	-	Wakasa-Takahama

== History ==
Wasasa-Wada Station was elevated from a provisional stop to a full passenger station on 1 June 1934. With the privatization of Japanese National Railways (JNR) on 1 April 1987, the station came under the control of JR West.

== Passenger statistics ==
In fiscal 2016, the station was used by an average of 136 passengers daily (boarding passengers only).

== Surrounding area ==
- National Route 27
- Aoto no Irie (青戸入江) A part of Wakasa Wan Quasi-National Park
- Wada Marina

== See also ==
- List of railway stations in Japan
