= Obama Line =

Railway line in Japan

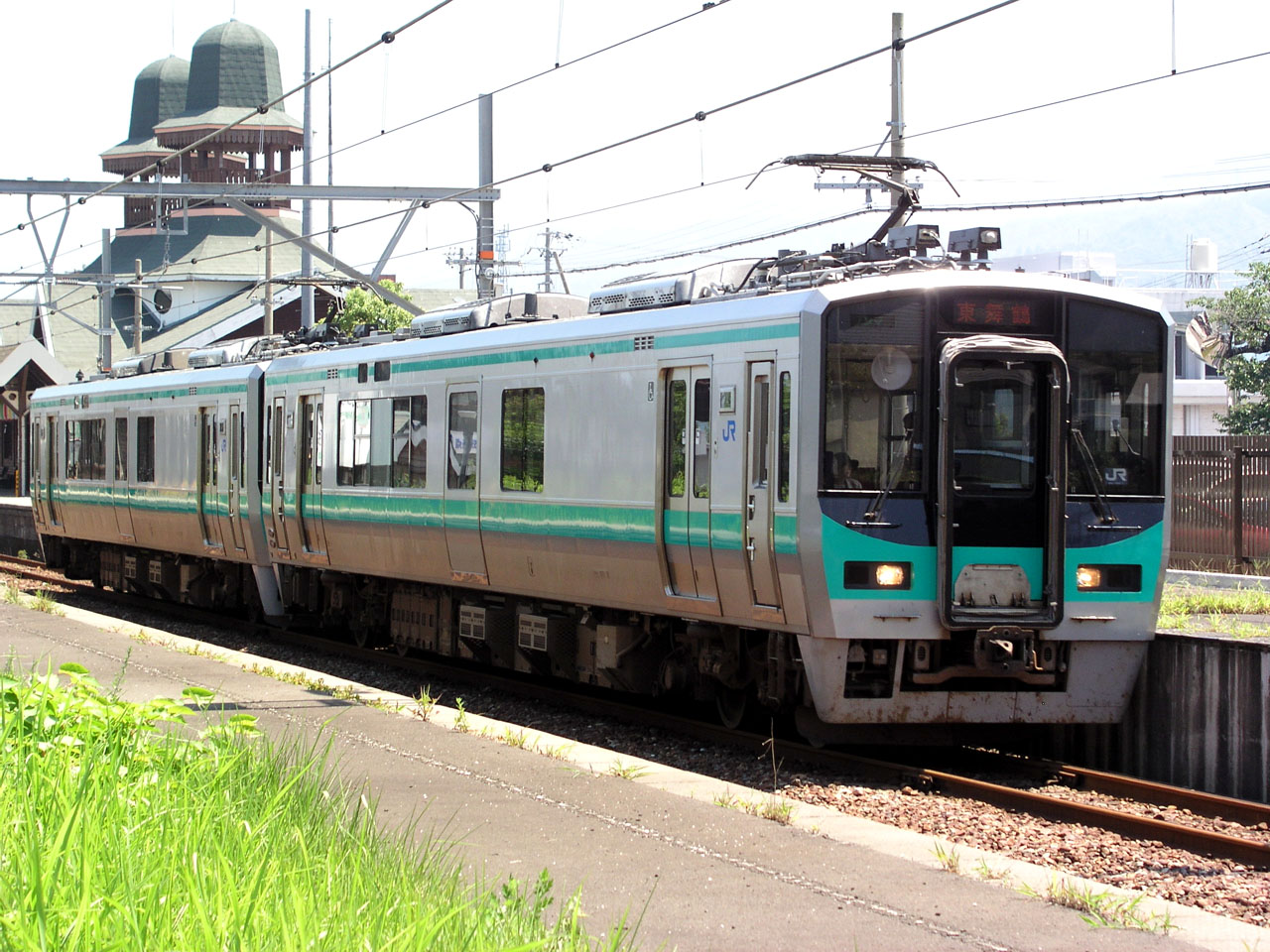
- An Obama Line 125 series train at Wakasa-Hongō Station

Overview
- Owner: JR West
- Locale: Fukui and Kyoto prefectures
- Termini: Higashi-Maizuru; Tsuruga
- Stations: 24

Service
- Rolling stock: 125 series
- Daily ridership: 1,078 per kilometer (FY2014)

History
- Opened: 15 December 1917; 108 years ago
- Last extension: 10 December 1922; 103 years ago
- Electrified: 15 March 2003; 23 years ago

Technical
- Line length: 84.3 km (52.4 mi)
- Number of tracks: 1
- Track gauge: 1,067 mm (3 ft 6 in)
- Electrification: Overhead line, 1,500 V DC
- Operating speed: 85 km/h (53 mph)
- Signalling: Special Automatic closing block (Track circuit detection)
- Train protection system: ATS-SW

The Obama Line (Japanese: 小浜線, Hepburn: Obama-sen) is a railway line on the Sea of Japan coast of central Japan. It is operated by West Japan Railway Company (JR West).

The 84.3-kilometre (52.4 mi) long single track railway connects Tsuruga Station on the Hokuriku Main Line in Tsuruga, Fukui Prefecture and Higashi-Maizuru Station on the Maizuru Line in Maizuru, Kyoto Prefecture. The city of Obama and the towns of Mihama, Wakasa, Ōi and Takahama are located in the central section of the line.

== History ==
The Tsuruga - Tomura section opened in 1917, and the line was then extended westward to Obama in 1918, Wakasa-Takahama in 1921 and connected to the Maizuru Line at Higashi-Maizuru the following year.

Freight services between Tsuruga and Mitsumatsu ceased in 1997.

The line was electrified on March 15, 2003.

== Stations ==
| Name | | Distance (km) | | Transfers | Location | |
| Name | | Between stations | Total | Transfers | Location | |
|---|---|---|---|---|---|---|
| Tsuruga | 敦賀 | —N/a | 0.0 | Hokuriku Shinkansen; A B Hokuriku Main Line; Hapi-Line Fukui Line | Tsuruga | Fukui |
| Nishi-Tsuruga | 西敦賀 | 3.3 | 3.3 | | Tsuruga | Fukui |
| Awano | 粟野 | 4.4 | 7.7 | | Tsuruga | Fukui |
| Higashi-Mihama | 東美浜 | 5.0 | 12.7 | | Mihama, Mikata District | Fukui |
| Mihama | 美浜 | 5.2 | 17.9 | | Mihama, Mikata District | Fukui |
| Kiyama | 気山 | 3.5 | 21.4 | | Wakasa, Mikatakaminaka District | Fukui |
| Mikata | 三方 | 3.3 | 24.7 | | Wakasa, Mikatakaminaka District | Fukui |
| Fujii | 藤井 | 2.6 | 27.3 | | Wakasa, Mikatakaminaka District | Fukui |
| Tomura | 十村 | 2.0 | 29.3 | | Wakasa, Mikatakaminaka District | Fukui |
| Ōtoba | 大鳥羽 | 4.0 | 33.3 | | Wakasa, Mikatakaminaka District | Fukui |
| Wakasa-Arita | 若狭有田 | 2.1 | 35.4 | | Wakasa, Mikatakaminaka District | Fukui |
| Kaminaka | 上中 | 3.4 | 38.8 | | Wakasa, Mikatakaminaka District | Fukui |
| Shin-Hirano | 新平野 | 4.5 | 43.3 | | Obama | Fukui |
| Higashi-Obama | 東小浜 | 2.9 | 46.2 | | Obama | Fukui |
| Obama | 小浜 | 3.3 | 49.5 | | Obama | Fukui |
| Seihama | 勢浜 | 3.7 | 53.2 | | Obama | Fukui |
| Kato | 加斗 | 4.0 | 57.2 | | Obama | Fukui |
| Wakasa-Hongō | 若狭本郷 | 4.6 | 61.8 | | Ōi, Ōi District | Fukui |
| Wakasa-Wada | 若狭和田 | 3.9 | 65.7 | | Takahama, Ōi District | Fukui |
| Wakasa-Takahama | 若狭高浜 | 3.2 | 68.9 | | Takahama, Ōi District | Fukui |
| Mitsumatsu | 三松 | 2.5 | 71.4 | | Takahama, Ōi District | Fukui |
| Aonogō | 青郷 | 2.1 | 73.5 | | Takahama, Ōi District | Fukui |
| Matsunoodera | 松尾寺 | 4.7 | 78.2 | | Maizuru | Kyoto |
| Higashi-Maizuru | 東舞鶴 | 6.1 | 84.3 | L Maizuru Line | Maizuru | Kyoto |

== Rolling stock ==
The line uses single-car 125 series EMU cars, sometimes substituted by 521 series EMU cars. And the limited express Hanaakari which used KiHa 189 DMU cars.

=== Former ===
- KiHa 20
- KiHa 48
- KiHa 53
- KiHa 26・55
- KiHa 28・58
- 113 series (until October 2006)

== See also ==
- List of railway lines in Japan
