= Matsunoodera Station =

Railway station in Maizuru, Kyoto Prefecture, Japan

Matsunoodera Station 松尾寺駅
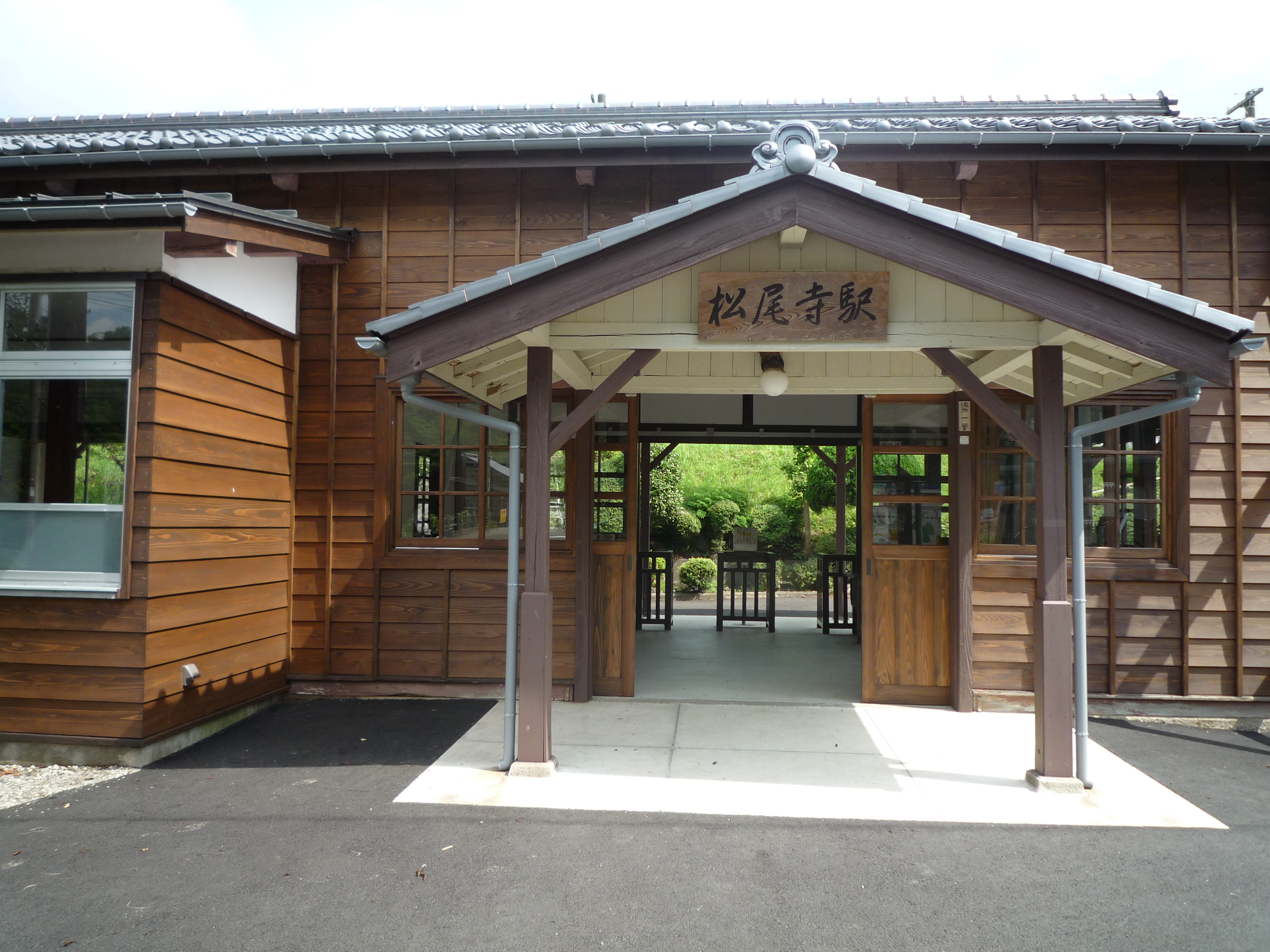
- The station building (July 2009)

General information
- Location: Kichisaka, Maizuru-shi, Kyoto-fu 625-0011; Japan
- Coordinates: 35.4861°N 135.4503°E
- Operator: JR West
- Line: ■ Obama Line
- Distance: 78.2 km from Tsuruga
- Platforms: 1 side platform
- Tracks: 1

Construction
- Structure type: Ground level
- Accessible: Yes

Other information
- Website: Official website

History
- Closed: 20 December 1922

Passengers
- FY 2023: 32 daily
Location
- Location within Kyoto Prefecture Location within Japan

Matsunoodera Station (松尾寺駅, Matsunoodera-eki) is a passenger railway station located in the city of Maizuru, Kyoto Prefecture, Japan, operated by West Japan Railway Company (JR West).

== Lines ==
Matsunoodera Station is served by the Obama Line and is 78.2 kilometers from the terminus of the line at Tsuruga.

== Layout ==
The station consists of a single side platform serving one bi-directional track. The station is unattended. The station building was transferred from JR West to Maizuru City on March 31, 2008, and after 14 million yen in renovations it opened in 2009 as the "Maizuru City Matsuodera Ekimae Tourism Exchange Facility" The station building was designated a Registered Tangible Cultural Property in 2018.

== Adjacent stations ==
«	Service	»
Obama Line
Aonogō	-	Higashi-Maizuru

== History ==
The station was opened on December 20, 1922

== Passenger statistics ==
In fiscal 2018, the station was used by an average of 47 passengers daily.

== Surrounding area ==
- Matsuo-dera
- Maizuru Industrial College of Technology

== See also ==
- List of railway stations in Japan
