= Obama Station =

Railway station in Obama, Fukui Prefecture, Japan

Obama Station 小浜駅
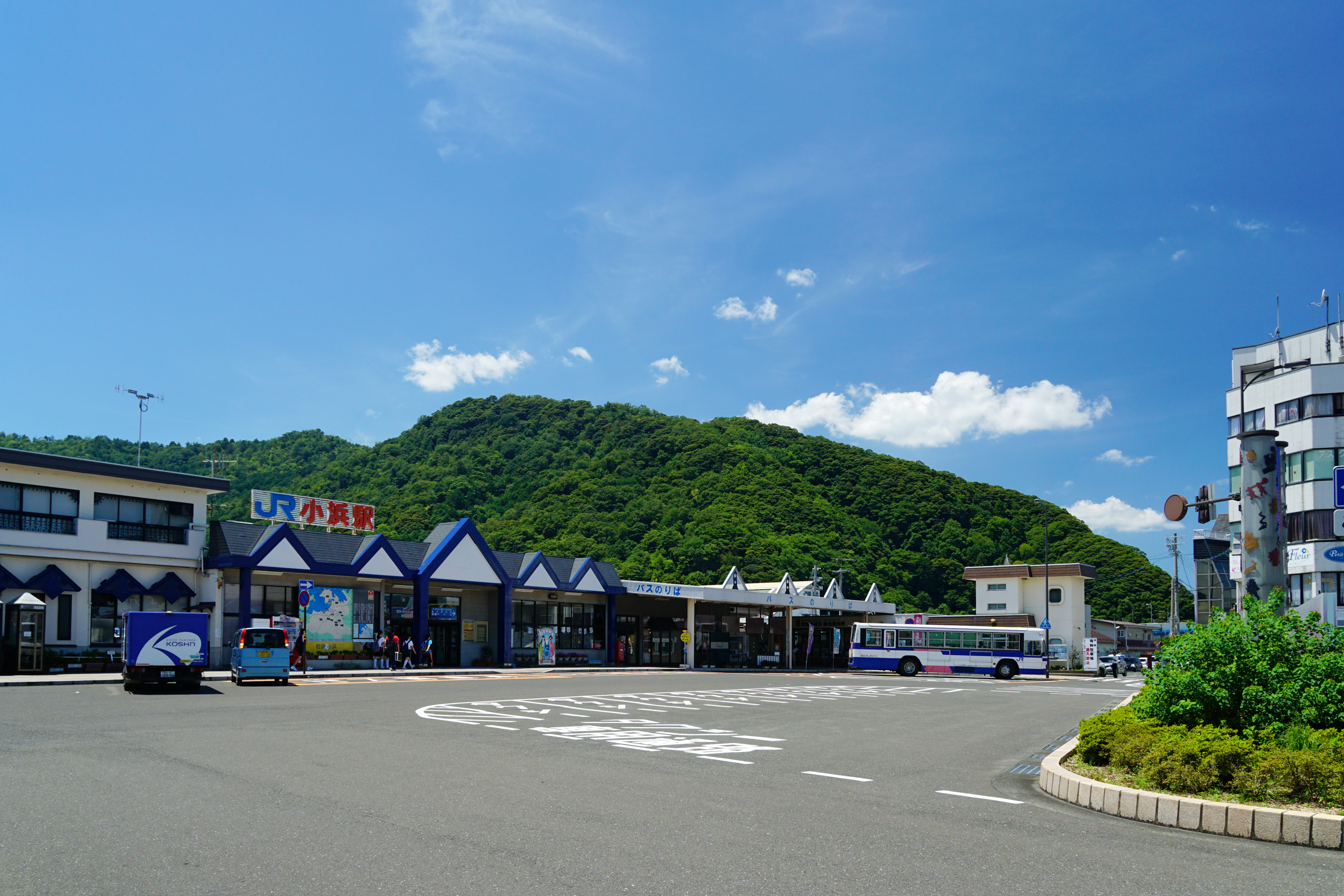
- Obama Station in July 2015

General information
- Location: 1-1 Ekimae-chō, Obama, Fukui Prefecture 917-0054; Japan
- Coordinates: 35.4919°N 135.7454°E
- Operator: JR West
- Line: Obama Line
- Distance: 49.5 km (30.8 mi) from Tsuruga
- Platforms: 1 side + 1 island platform
- Tracks: 3

Other information
- Status: Staffed (Midori no Madoguchi )
- Website: Official website

History
- Opened: 10 November 1918; 108 years ago

Passengers
- FY 2023: 1,528 daily

Services
Preceding station	JR West	Following station
Seihama towards Higashi-Maizuru	Obama Line Local	Higashi-Obama towards Tsuruga
Location
- Location within Fukui Prefecture Location within Kansai region Location within Japan

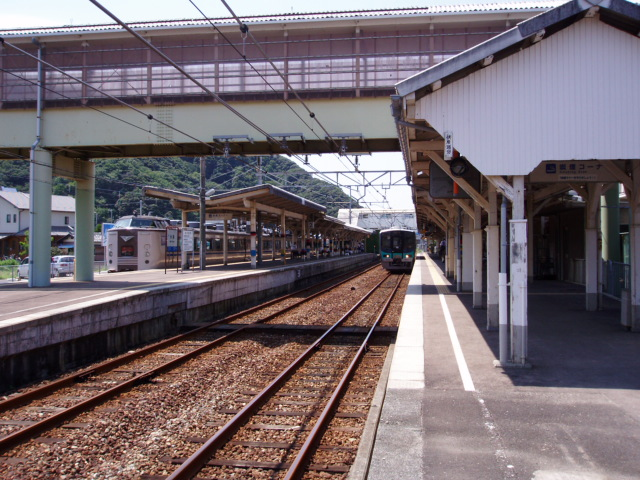
Obama Station platforms in August 2006

Obama Station (小浜駅, Obama-eki) is a railway station located in the city of Obama, Fukui, Japan, operated by West Japan Railway Company (JR West).

== Lines ==
Obama Station is served by the Obama Line linking Tsuruga in Tsuruga, Fukui with Higashi-Maizuru in Maizuru, Kyoto, and is located 49.5 kilometers from the terminus of the line at Tsuruga.

== Station layout ==
The station has one side platform and one island platform connected by a footbridge. The station has a Midori no Madoguchi staffed ticket office.

=== Platforms ===
1	Obama Line	for Tsuruga and Higashi-Maizuru (most trains)
2	Obama Line	for Higashi-Maizuru (occasionally)
3	Obama Line	for Tsuruga and Higashi-Maizuru (occasionally)

== History ==
Obama Station opened on 10 November 1918. With the privatization of Japanese National Railways (JNR) on 1 April 1987, the station came under the control of JR West.

== Passenger statistics ==
In fiscal 2016, the station was used by an average of 969 passengers daily (boarding passengers only).

== Surrounding area ==
- Obama City Hall
- Obama Castle
- Nochiseyama Castle
- National Route 27
- National Route 162

== See also ==
- List of railway stations in Japan
