= Ōi District, Fukui =

District in Fukui Prefecture, Japan

Coordinates: 35.427°N 135.564°E

Ōi (大飯郡, Ōi-gun) is a district located in Fukui Prefecture, Japan.

As of 2003, the district had an estimated population of 18,680 with a density of 133.18 persons per km^{2}. The total area is 140.26 km^{2}.

== Municipalities ==
The district consists of two towns:

- Ōi (Note: Classified as a town.)
- Takahama

== History ==
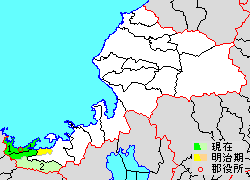
Map showing original extent of Ōi District in Fukui Prefecture: * yellow - areas formerly within the district borders during the early Meiji period: 1. Ōi-machi; 2. Takahama-machi

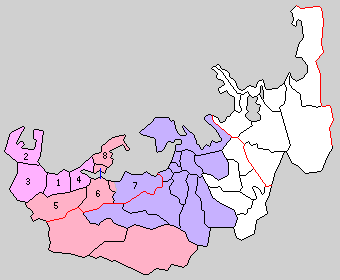
Colored areas are in this district.

=== Recent mergers ===
- On March 3, 2006 - The village of Natashō (from Onyū District) and the old town of Ōi merged to form the new town of Ōi. Onyū District was dissolved as a result.
