= Japan National Route 27 =

National highway in Japan

National Route 27
- 国道27号

Route information
- Length: 139.9 km (86.9 mi)
- Existed: 4 December 1952–present

Major junctions
- North end: National Route 8 in Tsuruga
- South end: National Route 9 in Kyōtamba

Location
- Country: Japan

Highway system
- National highways of Japan; Expressways of Japan
← National Route 26	→ National Route 28

National Route 27 (国道27号, Kokudō nijūnana-gō) is a national highway connecting Tsuruga and Kyotamba in Japan.

== Route data ==
- Length: 139.9 km (86.9 mi)
- Origin: Tsuruga (originates at junction with Route 8)
- Terminus: Kyotamba (ends at junction with Route 9)
- Major cities: Obama, Maizuru, Ayabe

== History ==
- 4 December 1952- - First Class National Highway 27 (from Tsuruga to Kyotamba)
- 1 April 1965- - General National Highway 27 (from Tsuruga to Kyotamba)

== Intersects with ==
- Fukui Prefecture
- Kyoto Prefecture
