= Obama (disambiguation) =

Barack Obama (born 1961) served as the 44th president of the United States from 2009 to 2017.

Obama may also refer to:

== Music ==
- "Obama", a song by Michael Shannon
- "Obama", a song by Anohni from the 2016 album Hopelessness
- "Obama", a song by Blueface from the 2020 album Find the Beat

== Fauna ==
- Obama (flatworm), a genus of terrestrial flatworms
- Etheostoma obama, a species of darter endemic to the eastern United States
- Tosanoides obama, a coral reef fish species in Hawaii

== People ==
- Obama (surname), a surname of African or Japanese origin, and any of several people with that name including:
  - Barack Obama Sr. (1934–1982), Kenyan government economist and father of the 44th president
  - Michelle Obama (born 1964), First Lady of the United States from 2009 to 2017
- Obama (drag queen), Italian drag queen
- Strict Asian Obama, a nickname for American actor Ken Leung

== Places ==
- Obama, Fukui, a city in Japan. Obama-chō (小浜町) was a former town in Japan that was merged with other towns in 1951 to create Obama, Fukui
- Obama, Nagasaki, a former town in Japan
- Obama Bay, a sub-bay within Wakasa Bay in Japan
- Obama Castle (Mutsu Province), Japan
- Obama Castle (Wakasa Province), Japan
- Obama Domain, a feudal domain in Edo-period Japan
- Obama Onsen, a hot spring in Nagasaki, Japan
- Obama-chō (小浜町), a former town in Japan that was merged with others in 2005 to create Unzen, Nagasaki
- Obama-machi (小浜町), a former town in Japan that was merged with others in 1955 to create Nihonmatsu, Fukushima
- Boggy Peak, named Mount Obama from 2009 to 2016, the highest point in Antigua and Barbuda

== Transportation ==
- Obama Line, a railroad line operated by West Japan Railway Company
  - Higashi-Obama Station, a train station on the Obama Line
  - Obama Station, a train station on the Obama Line
- Obama Interchange, a road junction on the Maizuru-Wakasa Expressway in Fukui Prefecture, Japan
- Obama Nishi Interchange, a road junction in Fukui Prefecture, Japan

== Other uses ==
- Obama Day, a national holiday in Kenya

== See also ==
- List of things named after Barack Obama
- Kohama (disambiguation)
- Ohama (disambiguation)
- Oppama (disambiguation)
- Osama (disambiguation)
- Obma
