= Omaha (disambiguation) =

Omaha is the largest city in Nebraska, United States.

Omaha may also refer to:

== Places ==
- Omaha Beach, the Allied code name for one of the June 6, 1944, Battle of Normandy landing sites
- Ōmaha, New Zealand, north of Auckland

=== United States ===
- Omaha, Alabama
- Omaha, Arkansas
- Omaha, Georgia
- Omaha, Illinois
- Omaha, Missouri
- Omaha, Nebraska
- Omaha, Texas
- Omaha, Virginia

== Games and sports ==
- Omaha (horse), winner of the US Triple Crown of Thoroughbred Racing in 1935
- College World Series, the tournament that ends the NCAA Division I baseball season, held in Omaha and thus sometimes called "Omaha"
- Omaha hold 'em, a poker variant
- Omaha Mavericks, the athletic program of the University of Nebraska Omaha

== Music ==
- Omaha (album), 2008 album by Ulf Lundell
- "Omaha", a 1973 song by Waylon Jennings from Honky Tonk Heroes
- "Omaha", a 1994 song by Counting Crows from August and Everything After
- "Omaha", a 1967 song by Moby Grape from Moby Grape
- "Omaha", a song by Tapes 'n Tapes

== Ships ==
- USS Omaha (1869), a sloop which served in the last decades of the 19th century
- USS Omaha (CL-4), the lead ship of the Omaha-class of light cruiser, served during World War II
- USS Omaha (SSN-692), a Los Angeles-class submarine, served during the last years of the Cold War
- USS Omaha (LCS-12), a Independence-class littoral combat ship, serving since 2018

== Other uses ==
- Omaha people, a Native American tribe that currently resides in the northeastern part of the US state of Nebraska
- Omaha (software), Google's open-source project providing automated deployment of software updates
- Omaha (film), a 2025 American film

== See also ==
- Omaha Township (disambiguation)
- Omaha the Cat Dancer, a graphic novel
- Omaha Steaks, a US meat retailer
- Omaha kinship, a patrilineal kinship system
- University of Nebraska Omaha, often referred to as Omaha
