= Obama (surname) =

Origin
- Languages: Fang and Luo, Japanese
- Meaning: Limping (Luo); Little beach (Japanese)
- Region of origin: African Great Lakes, Middle Africa, Japan

Obama is a surname. It most commonly refers to Barack Obama (born 1961), the 44th president of the United States.

== Origins ==
- Obama is a common Fang masculine name in western Central Africa. It means "hawk".
- Obama is a common Luo surname. It means "to lean", "to bend", "bent over", or "limping".
- Obama, also translated as Ohama or Kohama, (小浜 or 小濱) is a Japanese surname literally meaning "little beach" or "little island". It was the surname of a samurai clan.

== Notable people with this surname ==
- Barack Obama (born 1961), 44th president of the United States
  - Family of Barack Obama, an extended family of American and Kenyan heritage, including:
    - Michelle Obama (born 1964), wife of Barack Obama, and Vice President for Community and External Affairs for the University of Chicago Hospitals
    - Barack Obama Sr. (1934–1982), Kenyan economist and father to Barack Obama
    - Sarah Onyango Obama (1922–2021), also known as Sarah Ogwei, Kenyan educator and philanthropist, the third wife of Barack Obama's paternal grandfather
    - Auma Obama (born 1960), paternal half-sister of Barack Obama
    - Malik Obama (born 1958), paternal half-brother of Barack Obama
- Florent Obama (born 1991), a Cameroonian footballer
- Francisco Pascual Obama Asue, Equatoguinean prime minister 2016–23
- Jōkō Obama (小浜浄鉱, 1886–1948), a Japanese bureaucrat and politician
- Natsuki Obama (小濱なつき, born 1984), a Japanese fashion model and actor
- Pedro Obama (born 1987), Equatoguinean footballer
- Ricardo Mangue Obama Nfubea (born 1961), Equatoguinean prime minister 2006–08
- Salomón Obama (born 2000), Equatoguinean footballer
- Youssef Obama (born 1994), an Egyptian footballer

== See also ==
- Obama (disambiguation)
- Ohama (disambiguation)
- Kohama (disambiguation)
