= Obame =

Obame is a surname. Notable people with the surname include:

- André Mba Obame (1957–2015), Gabonese politician
- Anthony Obame (born 1988), Gabonese taekwondo practitioner
- Erwin Nguéma Obame (born 1989), Gabonese footballer

== See also ==
- Obama (surname)
