= Osama =

Osama or Usama may refer to:

== People ==
- Osama (name), an Arabic given name
  - Osama bin Laden (1957–2011), Saudi Arabia-born Islamist dissident and militant leader who founded al-Qaeda
- Ōsama (born 1960), Japanese musician

== Film ==
- Osama (film), a 2003 film made in Afghanistan
- Being Osama, a 2004 documentary film of six men named Osama

== Other uses ==
- "Osama" (song), a 2021 single by Zakes Bantwini
- Dinner With Osama, a 2008 collection of short stories by Marilyn Krysl
- Osama (novel), a 2011 World Fantasy Award-winning novel by Lavie Tidhar

== See also ==
- Obama (disambiguation)
- Ōsama Game, a Japanese 2011 horror film
- Osamu
