= Tokyo Girls Collection =

Japanese fashion festival

- Genre: Clothing and fashion exhibitions
- Frequency: Semi-annually
- Inaugurated: 2005
- Founder: Fumitaro Ohama Tokyo Girls Collection executive committee
- Attendance: 33,700 (2015 S/S)
- Sponsors: Ministry of Foreign Affairs, Japan Tourism Agency; Tokyo Metropolitan Government
- Website: girlswalker.com/tgc/

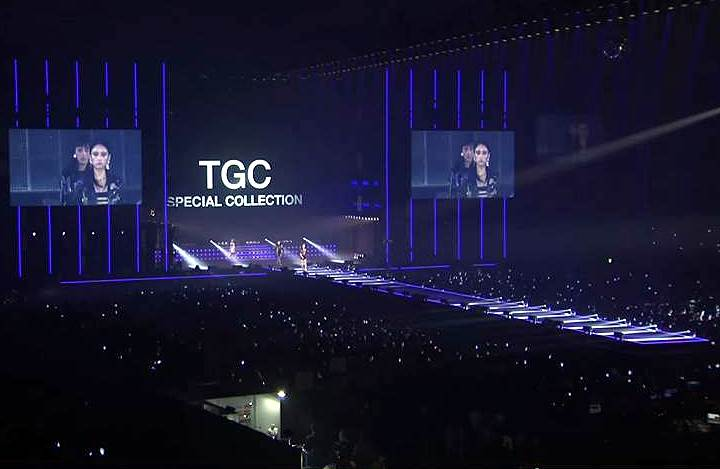
Mizuki Yamamoto in TGC 2014

The Tokyo Girls Collection (東京ガールズコレクション, Tōkyō Gāruzu Korekushon), sometimes abbreviated as TGC, is a semiannual fashion festival launched in 2005. It is mainly held near Tokyo area and some local cities such as Kitakyushu, Nagoya and Okinawa. The fashion event showcases the seasons fashionable streetwear by domestic brands. It was founded by Fumitaro Ohama.

The concept of TGC was an event displaying the wish and prayer for continued growth, prosperity and developments in Asia, mainly in Japan after the world war. The first show was produced by Ohama. In the later show, Ohama collaborated with Takashi Murakami, the contemporary artists, to bring fashion and art together in the show.

Most of those who walk in the TGC runway are muses for fashion brands, and many of them are not professional fashion models. Recently, as of 2012, actress Yumiko Shaku walked in the Spring-Summer TGC show as the muse for gyaru fashion brand "Rady" by Shizuka Mutoh, a model known for appearing in the Koakuma Ageha magazine.

The event is open not only to buyers and journalists, but also to the general public and incorporates live concerts by well-known artists, charity auctions as well as the Miss TGC Contest. The event is planned and sponsored by Branding Inc. (which runs girlswalker.com and fashionwalker.com) and the outfits donned by the models are made available for purchase on the spot through Fashionwalker's mobile site.

In June 2015, the event's license was purchased by the Japanese media company DLE (company) from Branding Inc. The first TGC to be organized by DLE was held on September 27, 2015. In July 2016, DLE took over complete control of TGC from Branding Inc., creating a new governing company, W Media.

In 2025, Shigeru Ishiba became the first Japanese prime minister to appear at the fashion show.

== Past venues ==
Event	Date	Venue	Total Brands & Models	Guest Performers	Ref.
1st Tokyo Girls Collection; 2005 Autumn/Winter	August 7, 2005	Yoyogi National Gymnasium	25 brands; 30 models	M-Flo (and Akiko Wada)	
2nd Tokyo Girls Collection; 2006 Spring/Summer	March 11, 2006	Yoyogi National Gymnasium	23 brands; 45 models	Yuna Ito, AI, Rihanna, DefTech	
3rd Tokyo Girls Collection; 2006 Autumn/Winter	September 3, 2006	Yoyogi National Gymnasium	23 brands; 54 models	Ayaka, Sowelu, BoA	
4th Tokyo Girls Collection; 2007 Spring/Summer	March 3, 2007	Yokohama Arena	25 brands; 72 models	Tamia, DJ Ozma, Minmi, Shonan no Kaze	
TGC in Beijing '07	March 26, 2007	China International Exhibition Center	11 brands; 13 models	---	
5th Tokyo Girls Collection; 2007 Autumn/Winter	September 2, 2007	Saitama Super Arena	21 brands; 61 models	Leah Dizon, TVXQ, DJ Ozma, Go Hiromi	
TGC in Beijing '08	March 28, 2008	China International Exhibition Center	9 brands; 23 models	---	
6th Tokyo Girls Collection; 2008 Spring/Summer	March 15, 2008	Yoyogi National Gymnasium	23 brands; 60 models	Chemistry, FUNKY MONKEY BABYS	
7th Tokyo Girls Collection; 2008 Autumn/Winter	September 6, 2008	Yoyogi National Gymnasium	21 brands; 70 models	PUFFY, Kimaguren, Dohzi-T feat.BENI	
8th Tokyo Girls Collection; 2009 Spring/Summer	March 7–8, 2009^{1}	Yoyogi National Gymnasium	26 brands; 60 models	Kumi Kouda, Juju, Shota Shimizu (TGC); Kreva, Miliyah Kato (SGC)	
9th Tokyo Girls Collection; 2009 Autumn/Winter	September 5, 2009	Yoyogi National Gymnasium	31 brands	Thelma Aoyama, Issei Yoshimi	
10th Tokyo Girls Collection; 2010 Spring/Summer	March 6, 2010	Yokohama Arena	20 brands	Miliyah Kato, Kumi Kouda, 369+Seira Kagami	
Tokyo Girls Collection in Okinawa	April 24, 2010	Okinawa Convention Center	12 brands	Sātāandagī, Da Pump, BENI, MAX, YU-A, Riena&Marin	
11th Tokyo Girls Collection; 2010 Autumn/Winter	September 4, 2010	Saitama Super Arena	22 brands	Kana Nishino, May J., Sātāandagī, Kishidan, AKB48, French Kiss, Air Visual Band, Blue Man Group	
TGC in Nagoya 2011	February 19, 2011	Nagoya Dome	18 brands	W-inds., SKE48, Mary Sara, Sandaime J Soul Brothers, Kana Nishino, MAA, Happiness, Takahiro with NY The Movement	
12th Tokyo Girls Collection; 2011 Spring/Summer	March 5, 2011	Yoyogi National Gymnasium	20 brands	W-inds., Sandaime J Soul Brothers, After School, 2PM, Funky Monkey Babys, Jamosa	
13th Tokyo Girls Collection; 2011 Autumn/Winter	September 3, 2011	Saitama Super Arena	16 brands	E-girls, T-ara, Naoto Inti Raymi, Yui, AILI×DJ Kaori ft. Iconiq, Cirque du Soleil, Ram Wire, A.N.JELL, ISSA+SoulJa, Kis-My-Ft2	
14th Tokyo Girls Collection; 2012 Spring/Summer	March 3, 2012	Yokohama Arena	30 brands	IU, Kie Kitano, Kyary Pamyu Pamyu, Crystal Kay, Jamosa, TEE, DJ Kaori, Naoto Inti Raymi, Kana Nishino, Milky Bunny, Kaji on the Intelligence, Silent Siren, Kara, Shōwa Jidai	
TGC in Nagoya 2012	September 1, 2012	Nagoya Dome	22 brands	IU, After School, Leo Ieiri, SKE48, Orange Caramel, Sonar Pocket, Home Made Kazoku, Milky Bunny, Ms.OOJA, Akihisa Kondō, YU-A	
15th Tokyo Girls Collection; 2012 Autumn/Winter	October 13, 2012	Saitama Super Arena	21 brands	Kyary Pamyu Pamyu, Sonar Pocket, AAA, flumpoo, Milky Bunny, Momoyo Fukuda, Sayaka Shionoya, Tetsuya Komuro, TRF	
16th Tokyo Girls Collection; 2013 Spring/Summer	March 2, 2013	Yoyogi National Gymnasium	16 brands	AI, M-Flo+Special Artist, Generations from Exile Tribe, Sumire, Dream5, Kana Nishino, YU-A	
17th Tokyo Girls Collection; 2013 Autumn/Winter	August 31, 2013	Saitama Super Arena	17 brands	Shota Shimizu, Kana Nishino, HKT48, Alice, SHUN, Rei Yasuda, Linda Sansei, Jin Akanishi, Flower	
18th Tokyo Girls Collection; 2014 Spring/Summer	March 1, 2014	Yoyogi National Gymnasium	16 brands	Kyary Pamyu Pamyu, Generations from Exile Tribe, Tempura Kidz, Rei Yasuda, fumika, Eiko Murayama	
TGC in Fukushima 2014	April 29, 2014	Big Palette Fukushima	14 brands	Chris Hart, Minmi, SHUN	
19th Tokyo Girls Collection; 2014 Autumn/Winter	September 6, 2014	Saitama Super Arena	18 brands	color-code, Kaela Kimura, The Rampage from Exile Tribe, Shinee, Doberman Infinity, MACO, Eiko Murayama with M, OZ, Solidemo Cheeky Parade	
20th Tokyo Girls Collection; 2015 Spring/Summer	February 28, 2015	Yoyogi National Gymnasium	13 brands	Big Bang, Thelma Aoyama, Solidemo, Rei Yasuda, DJ Fumi Yeah!, Super Girls, YU-A	
21st Tokyo Girls Collection; 2015 Autumn/Winter	September 27, 2015	Yoyogi National Gymnasium	16 brands	Crystal Kay, Kumi Kouda, Juju, Hitomi Kaji, Edge of Life, lol, JJCC, Twiggz Fam × Honoka Moriyama, Dream5	
Takagi presents TGC Kitakyushu 2015 by Tokyo Girls Collection	October 17, 2015	West Japan General Exhibition Center	12 brands	Sonar Pocket, Daishi Dance, MACO, May J., Rev. from DVL, GEM, Beat Buddy Boi	
22nd Tokyo Girls Collection; 2016 Spring/Summer	March 19, 2016	Yoyogi National Gymnasium	17 brands	Alexandra Stan, Winner, Kyary Pamyu Pamyu, AAA, lol, Beat Buddy Boi, Edge of Life, GEM	
23rd Tokyo Girls Collection; 2016 Autumn/Winter	September 3, 2016	Saitama Super Arena	15 brands	CL, Bullet Train, Nogizaka46, Boys and Men, Hitomi Kaji, BExDUNK, Carat, FlowBack, Radio Fish	
Takagi presents TGC Kitakyushu 2016 by Tokyo Girls Collection	October 9, 2016	West Japan General Exhibition Center	19 brands	Sonoko Inoue, lol, Shinjiro Atae(AAA), Da-ice, Nogizaka46, Apeace, The Beat Garden, Dekøra, Spicy Chocolate, Naoto Inti Raymi, Rei Yasuda	
24th Tokyo Girls Collection 2017 Spring/Summer	March 25, 2017	Yoyogi National Gymnasium	17 brands	iKon, lol, Stanna Yuz Yuri, TM Revolution, miva, Hara Station Stage A, B2 talk!, The Beat Garden, FlowBack, Fluffy	
Takagi presents TGC Kitakyushu 2017 by Tokyo Girls Collection	October 21, 2017	West Japan General Exhibition Center	15 brands	Nogizaka46, Golden Bomber, Shuta Sueyoshi, Faky	
Istyle presents TGC Hiroshima 2017 by Tokyo Girls Collection Autumn/Winter	December 9, 2017	Hiroshima Prefectural Sports Center	19 brands	Blackpink, Ohara Sakurako, Daesung (Big Bang), The Rampage from Exile Tribe, Dance Earth Party	
Mynavi presents 26th Tokyo Girls Collection 2018 Spring/Summer	March 31, 2018	Yokohama Arena	17 brands	M-Flo, Nogizaka46, Keyakizaka46, Blackpink, Crazyboy, Kaji Hitomi, Hanazawa Kana, Honoka Moriyama, JY, DMO, BananaLemon, Ruann	
Mynavi presents 27th Tokyo Girls Collection 2018 Autumn/Winter	September 1, 2018	Saitama Super Arena		Twice, Chuning Candy, Yoyoka	
Takagi presents TGC Kitakyushu 2018 by Tokyo Girls Collection	October 6, 2018	West Japan General Exhibition Center		Hiragana Keyakizaka46, Blackpink, Chuning Candy	
Mynavi presents 28th Tokyo Girls Collection 2019 Spring/Summer	March 30, 2019	Yokohama Arena		Hinatazaka46, Ohara Sakurako, Dish, GFriend, Yoshida Rinne	
Mynavi presents 29th Tokyo Girls Collection 2019 Autumn/Winter	September 7, 2019	Saitama Super Arena	17 brands	Iz*One, Snow Man, Tomorrow X Together, KSUKE, Bambi Naka, Fabulous Sisters, Yoyoka, Kyoto Samurai Boys, Last Idol	
Takagi presents TGC Kitakyushu 2019 by Tokyo Girls Collection	October 5, 2019	West Japan General Exhibition Center		Iz*One, Hinatazaka46, Boys and Men, Chou (HKT48)	
SDGs Promotion TGC Shizuoka 2020 by Tokyo Girls Collection	January 11, 2020	Twin Messe Shizuoka		Hinatazaka46	
Mynavi presents 31st Tokyo Girls Collection 2020 Autumn/Winter Online	September 5, 2020	Saitama Super Arena		JO1, Novelbright, OWV, Deep Squad, Miki Kuroki	
Mynavi presents 35th Tokyo Girls Collection 2022 Autumn/Winter	September 3, 2022	Saitama Super Arena		aespa	
SDGs Promotion TGC Shizuoka 2023 by Tokyo Girls Collection	January 14, 2023	Twin Messe Shizuoka			
Mynavi presents 36th Tokyo Girls Collection 2023 Spring/Summer	March 4, 2023	Yoyogi National Gymnasium		NewJeans, &Team, Da-ice, Bish, Be:First	
The 37th Mynavi Tokyo Girls Collection 2023 Autumn/Winter (Mynavi TGC 2023 A/W)	September 2, 2023	Saitama Super Arena		Le Sserafim, &Team, XG	
41st Mynavi Tokyo Girls Collection 2025 A/W	September 6, 2025	Saitama Super Arena		MEOVV	
TGC Kitakyushu 2025 by Tokyo Girls Collection	October 11, 2025	West Japan General Exhibition Center		@onefive, DXteen, Fifty Fifty, Fruits Zipper, ME:I	

^Note 1: To expand to a wider audience the Tokyo Girls Collection will team up with the Shibuya Girls Collection and extend to a two-day event. The first day will host the 8th Tokyo Girls Collection while the second day will host the 3rd Shibuya Girls Collection.
