= Ohama =

Ohama or Ōhama may refer to:

== People ==
People with the surname Ohama or Ōhama

- Fumitaro Ohama (born 1971), Japanese internet entrepreneur and philanthropist
- Kendra Ohama (born 1965), Canadian retired wheelchair basketball player
- Linda Ohama, Canadian filmmaker and artist
- Ohama Kagetaka (1540–1597), pirate and naval general
- Takako Ohama (Rei Igarashi, born 1963), Japanese actress
- Yasushi Ōhama, Japanese actor known professionally as Show Hayami

== Other ==
- Ohama, a former branch line of the Hankai Tramway
- Ōhama-class target ship, a bombing target ship class of the Imperial Japanese Navy serving during World War II
- Ōhama Domain, a Japanese domain of the Edo period, associated with Shinano Province in modern-day Nagano Prefecture

== See also ==
- Obama (disambiguation) and Kohama (disambiguation) for the word written in Japanese with the kanji 小浜, but pronounced Obama or Kohama
- Omaha (disambiguation)
