= Shin-Hirano Station =

Railway station in Obama, Fukui Prefecture, Japan

Shin-Hirano Station 新平野駅
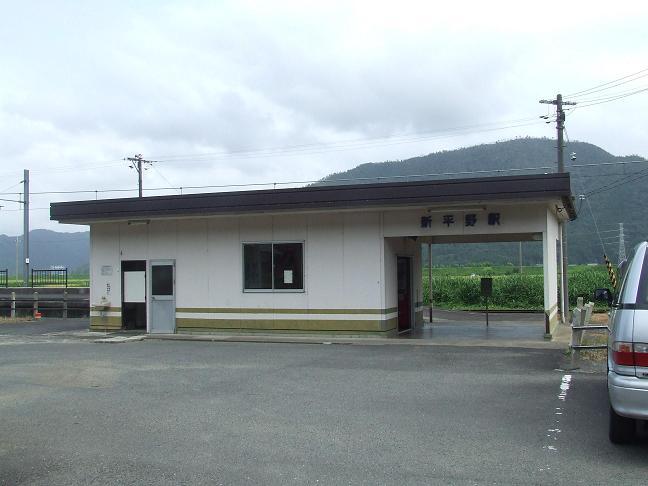
- Shin-Hirano Station in August 2009

General information
- Location: 19-2Hirano, Obama-shi, Fukui-ken 917-0226; Japan
- Coordinates: 35.4728°N 135.8071°E
- Distance: 44.3 km from Tsuruga
- Platforms: 1 side platform
- Tracks: 1

Other information
- Status: Unstaffed
- Website: Official website

History
- Opened: 10 November 1918; 107 years ago

Passengers
- FY 2023: 126 daily
Location
- Location within Japan

Shin-Hirano Station (新平野駅, Shin-Hirano-eki) is a railway station in the city of Obama, Fukui Prefecture, Japan, operated by West Japan Railway Company (JR West).

== Lines ==
Shin-Hirano Station is served by the Obama Line, and is located 43.3 kilometers from the terminus of the line at Tsuruga.

== Station layout ==
The station consists of one side platform serving a single bi-directional track. The station is unattended.

== Adjacent stations ==
«	Service	»
Obama Line
Rapid: Does not stop at this station
Kaminaka	Local	Higashi-Obama

== History ==
Shin-Hirano Station opened on 10 November 1918. With the privatization of Japanese National Railways (JNR) on 1 April 1987, the station came under the control of JR West. The station building was rebuilt in 1988.

== Passenger statistics ==
In fiscal 2016, the station was used by an average of 77 passengers daily (boarding passengers only).

== Surrounding area ==
- National Route 27
- Shimofunazuka Kofun
- Kamifunazuka Kofun

== See also ==
- List of railway stations in Japan
