= Marilyn Krysl =

American writer (1942–2024)

Marilyn Krysl (February 26, 1942 – July 4, 2024) was an American writer of short stories and poetry who is known for her quirky and witty storytelling. She has published four short story collections along with seven collections of poetry. She has won several awards for her work, including the 2008 Richard Sullivan Prize for short fiction for her collection of short stories, Dinner With Osama, which is a sociopolitical satire of post-9/11 America. Krysl also submitted work to The Atlantic journal, The Nation journal, and The New Republic journal, as well as being an editor of Many Mountains Moving: A Literary Journal of Diverse, Contemporary Voices along with Naomi Horii.

== Biography ==
Marilyn Krysl was born on February 26, 1942. As a senior in high school, she won the 1960 Oregon Award for Creativity. She entered the University of Oregon on a full tuition scholarship, courtesy of the award, in 1961. As an undergraduate she won the Alicia Woods Poetry Award, Julia Burgess Poetry Award, Peter Pauper Press Essay Prize, and the Ernest Haycox Short Story Prize.

She graduated in 1964, completed her MFA at University of Oregon in 1968, and in 1972 accepted a faculty position in the Dept. of English at University of Colorado, Boulder. She later served in the Department as Director of Creative Writing.

At the invitation of Naomi Horii, Horii and Krysl co-edited and launched the literary journal Many Mountains Moving.

Krysl died on July 4, 2024, at the age of 82.

== Awards and recognition ==
1960 Oregon Award for Creativity, University of Oregon full tuition scholarship
1961 Alicia Woods Poetry Award, University of Oregon
1961 Julia Burgess Poetry Award, University of Oregon
1961 Peter Pauper Press Essay Prize
1964 Ernest Haycox Short Story Prize, University of Oregon
1971 Harlan Ellison Speculative Fiction Fellowship, Writers Conference, University of Colorado
1974 National Endowment for the Arts Fellowship
1977–1978 Faculty Fellowship, University of Colorado
1979 Utah State Arts Council Traveling Poetry Exhibition
1980 Finalist, San Francisco State Poetry Center Book Prize
1981 John O’Hara Journal Fiction Prize for Mozart, Westmoreland and Me
1981 Oasis Prize, Poetry Society of Georgia, for “The Unicorn.”
1984 Kansas Quarterly Poetry Prize, for “The Beautiful Alive Alone Illusion”
1985 YADDO Fellowship
1986 Arts and Humanities Book Award, University of Colorado
1986–1987 Artist in Residence and Artist's Commission, Center for Human Caring, Health Sciences Center, University of Colorado
1989 Performing Arts Grant, Boulder Arts Commission
1989 President's Fund for the Humanities Grant, University of Colorado
1990 Mountains and Plains Booksellers’ Assoc. Award for Poetry for What We Have To Live With
1991–1992 Faculty Fellowship, University of Colorado
1993 Negative Capability Award for Fiction
1995 Spoon River Poetry Review Poetry Prize
1996 Cleveland State Poetry Center Book Prize and publication
1997 American Council of Learned Societies Contemplative Fellowship in conjunction with Marcia Westkott of Women Studies
2000–2001 National Endowment for the Arts Fellowship
2001 Lawrence Foundation Prize for Fiction, from Prairie Schooner
2002 Essay Prize, from Prairie Schooner
2003 Geraldine McLoud Commendation for Fiction, from Nimrod
2005 YADDO fellowship
2007 Notre Dame's Richard Sullivan Prize for Dinner with Osama
2008 ForeWord Magazine's Short Story Book of the Year Bronze Award for Dinner With Osama
2023 Karen Chamberlain Lifetime Achievement Award for Poetry in Colorado
