= Oppama =

Oppama may refer to:

- Oppama, a location in Yokosuka, Kanagawa Prefecture, Japan
- Oppama Station, a train station on the Keikyū Main Line in Japan
- Oppama Base or Oppama Test Facility, a fictional location in the anime series Sky Girls
- Masato Oppama, a fictional character from the anime series Animation Runner Kuromi
- Seawise Giant (1974–2010), the largest ship in the world, was originally named Oppama

== See also ==
- Obama (disambiguation)
