= Wakasahiko Shrine =

Shrine in Obama, Fukui

Wakasahiko Jinja 若狭彦神社
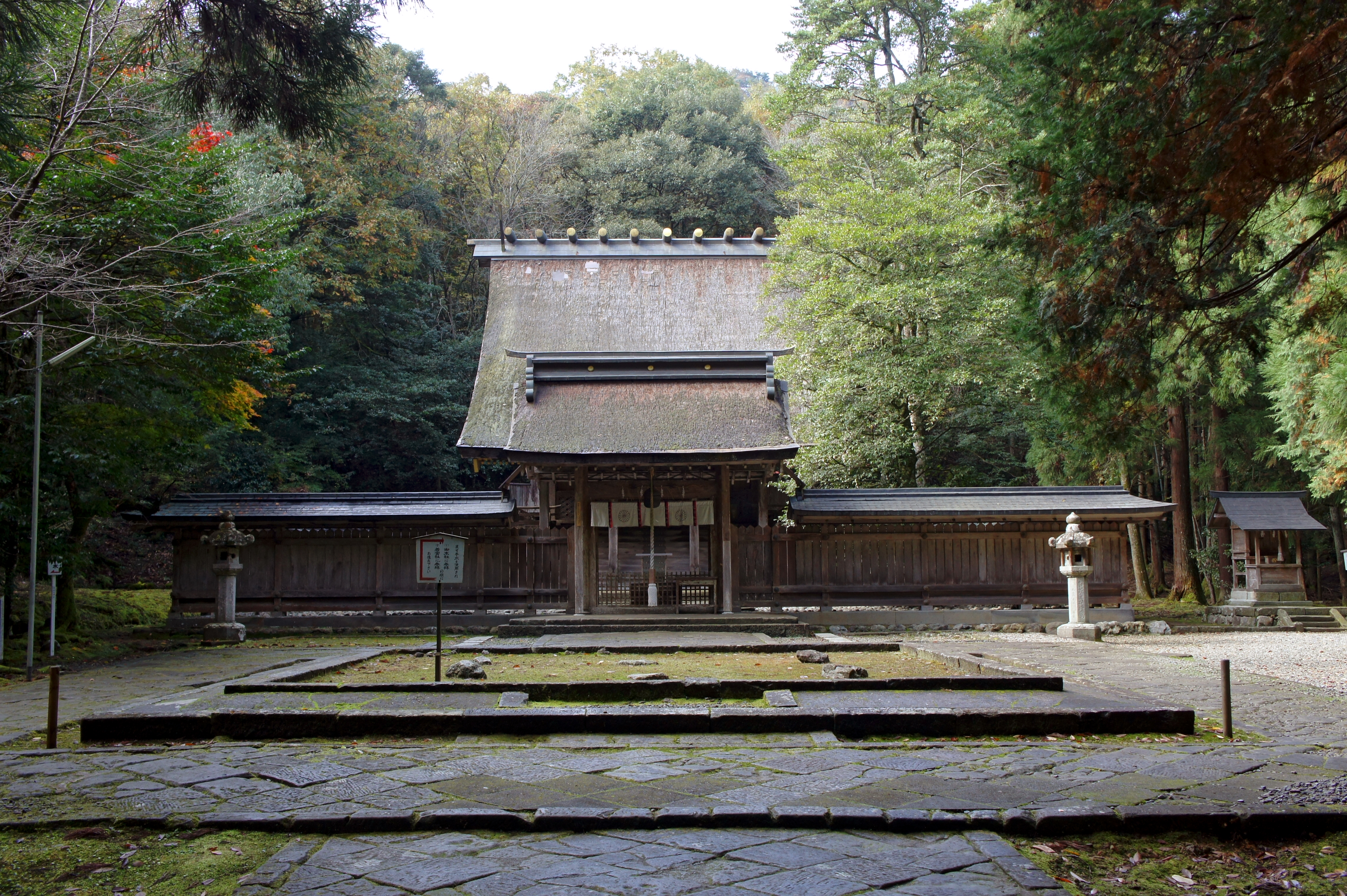
- Wakasahiko Jinja Shrine

- Location within Fukui Prefecture Location within Japan

Religion
- Affiliation: Shinto
- Deity: Hoori; Toyotama-hime
- Festivals: October 10 (upper shrine); March 10 (lower shrine)

Location
- Location: Obama-shi, Fukui-ken
- Interactive map of Wakasahiko Jinja 若狭彦神社
- Coordinates: 35°27′57.9″N 135°46′42.5″E

Architecture
- Established: c.714

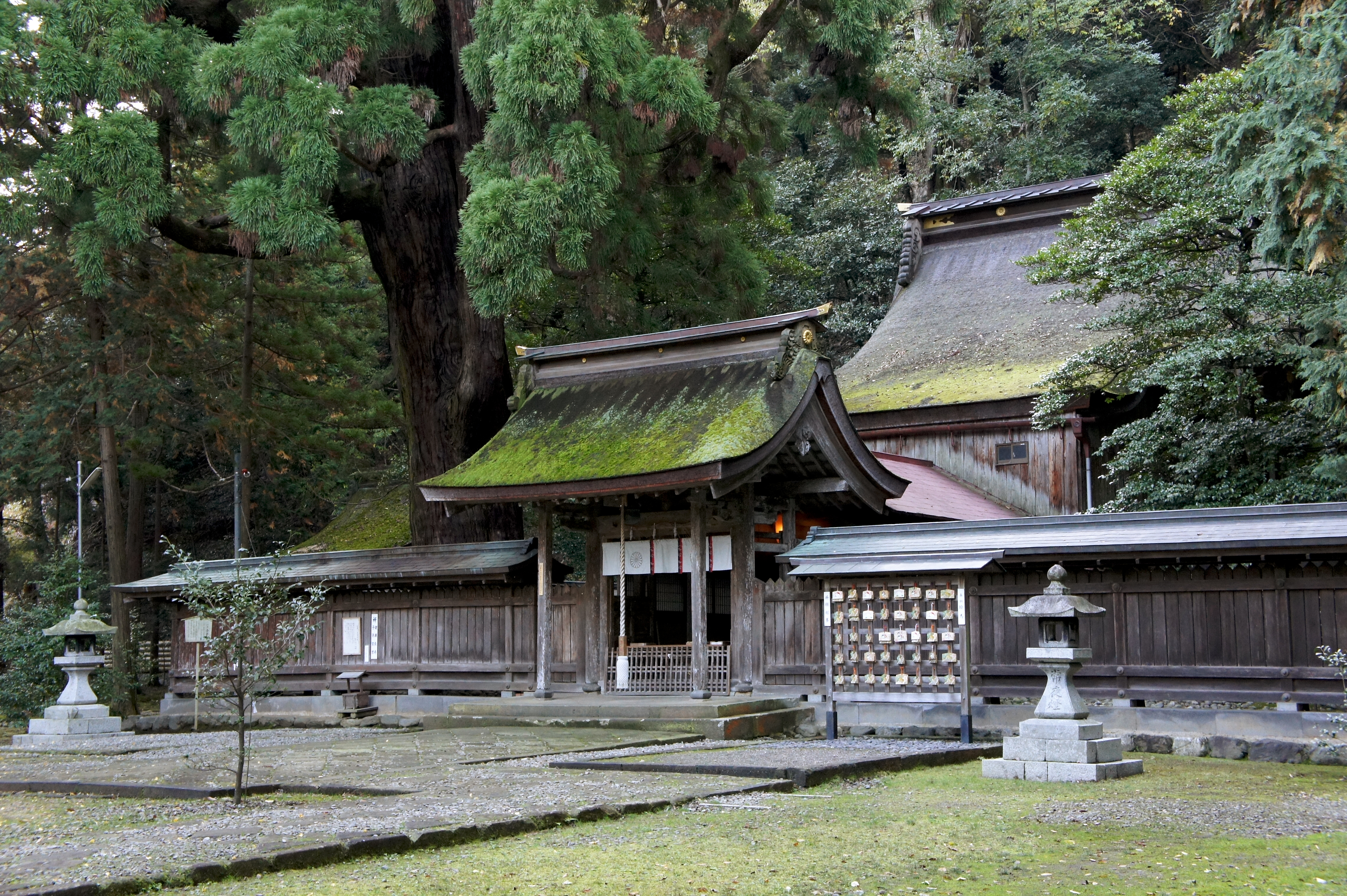
Wakasahime Jinja

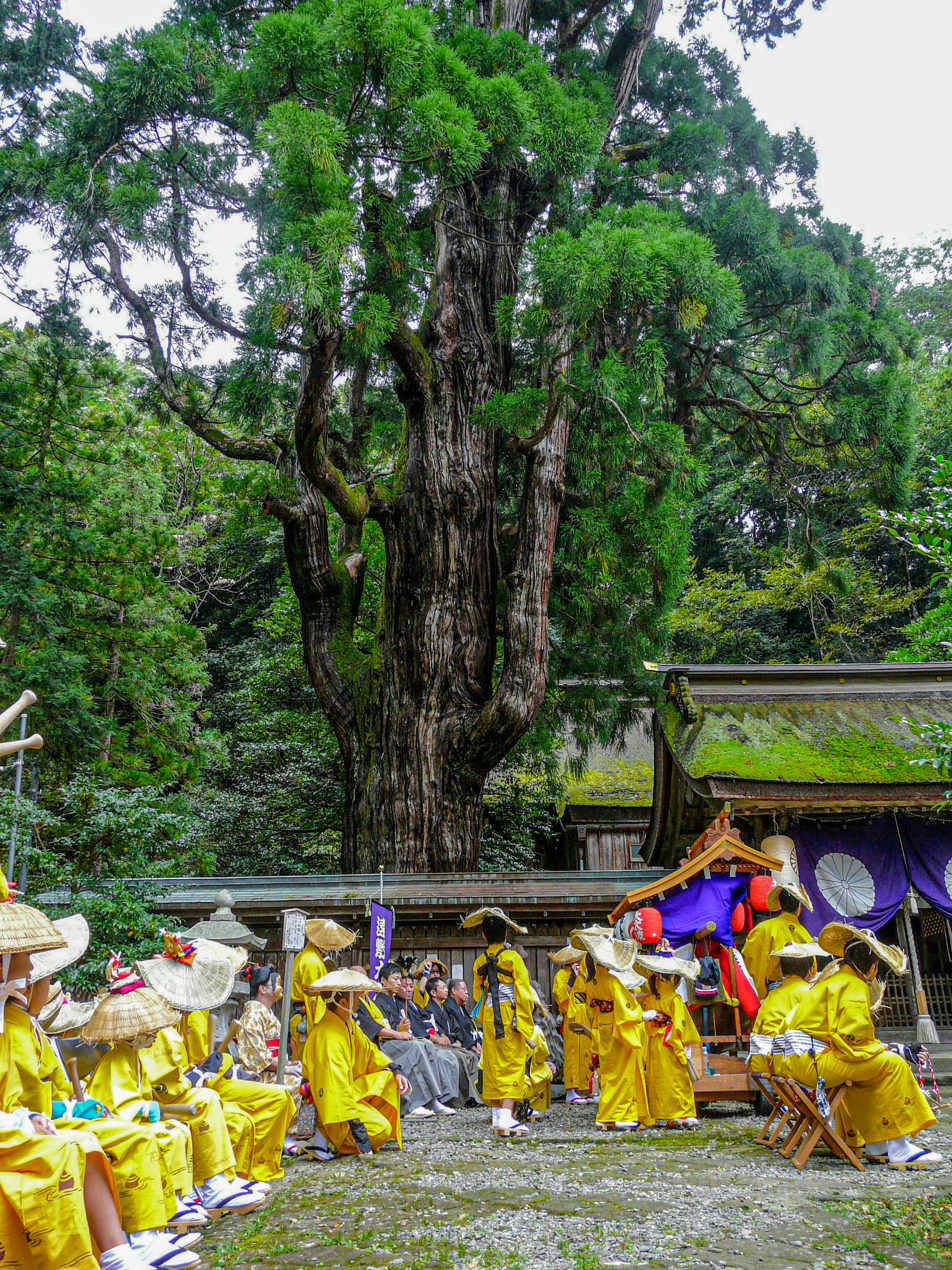
Onyu Festival at Wakasahime Jinja (Festival dedicated to God)

Wakasahiko Jinja (若狭彦神社) is a Shinto shrine in the city of Obama in Fukui Prefecture, Japan. It is the ichinomiya of former Wakasa Province. The main festivals of the shrine are held annually on October 10 and March 10. The shrine is actually a twin shrine, consisting of the Wakasahiko Shrine (若狭彦神社, Wakasahiko jinja), or "upper shrine", and the Wakasahime Shrine (若狭姫神社, Wakasahime jinja), or "lower shrine". It is also sometimes referred to as the Onyu Myōjin (若狭彦神社)

== Enshrined kami ==
The kami enshrined at Wakasahiko Jinja are:

- Upper shrine: Hikohohodemi no Mikoto (彦火火出見尊), the son of Ninigi and grandfather of Emperor Jimmu
- Lower shrine: Toyotama-hime (豊玉姫命), the daughter of the sea deity, Watatsumi.

== Overview ==
The shrine is located at the foot of Mt. Tadagadake in the southeast from the center of Obama city. Wakasahiko Shrine was formerly worshipped by seafarers, as Hoori is said to have obtained magical beads with which he could manipulate the tides while residing at Ryūgū-jō; however, today he is regarded as the god of tatami mats, and is now also worshiped by people involved in interior decoration. Wakasahime Shrine is said to have a spiritual power for easy delivery and childcare. Currently, most of the festivals are held at the lower shrine, Wakasahime Shrine, and the priesthood is also resident only at the lower shrine.

== History ==
The origins of Wakasahiko Jinja are unknown. According to the shrine's legend, the two kami appeared in the guise of people from Tang at Shiraishi hamlet in Shimonegori village, Onyu County and the Wakasahiko Jinja was built in 714. It was related to its present location in 715. The lower shrine, Wakasahime Jinja was built in 721. The shrine first appears in historical documentation in the Nihon Sandai Jitsuroku in an entry dated 859, when the upper shrine was promoted to senior second rank, and the lower shrine to junior third rank. In the Engishiki records of 927, the shrine is listed as a Myōjin Taisha. By the Kamakura period, the Wakasahiko Jinja was named the ichinomiya and the Wakasahime Jinja as the ninomiya of the province. Originally the upper shrine was the center of rituals, but this shifted to the lower shrine in the Muromachi period. During the Meiji period era of State Shinto, the shrine was rated as a national shrine, 2nd rank (国幣中社, kokuhei-chūsha), under the modern system of ranked Shinto shrines.

== Precincts ==
=== Wakasahiko Jinja (Upper shrine) ===
- Honden – Edo Period (1813), Fukui Prefectural Tangible Cultural Property
- Rōmon (Zuishin-mon) – Edo Period (1830) Fukui Prefectural Tangible Cultural Property
- Gate – Fukui Prefectural Tangible Cultural Property
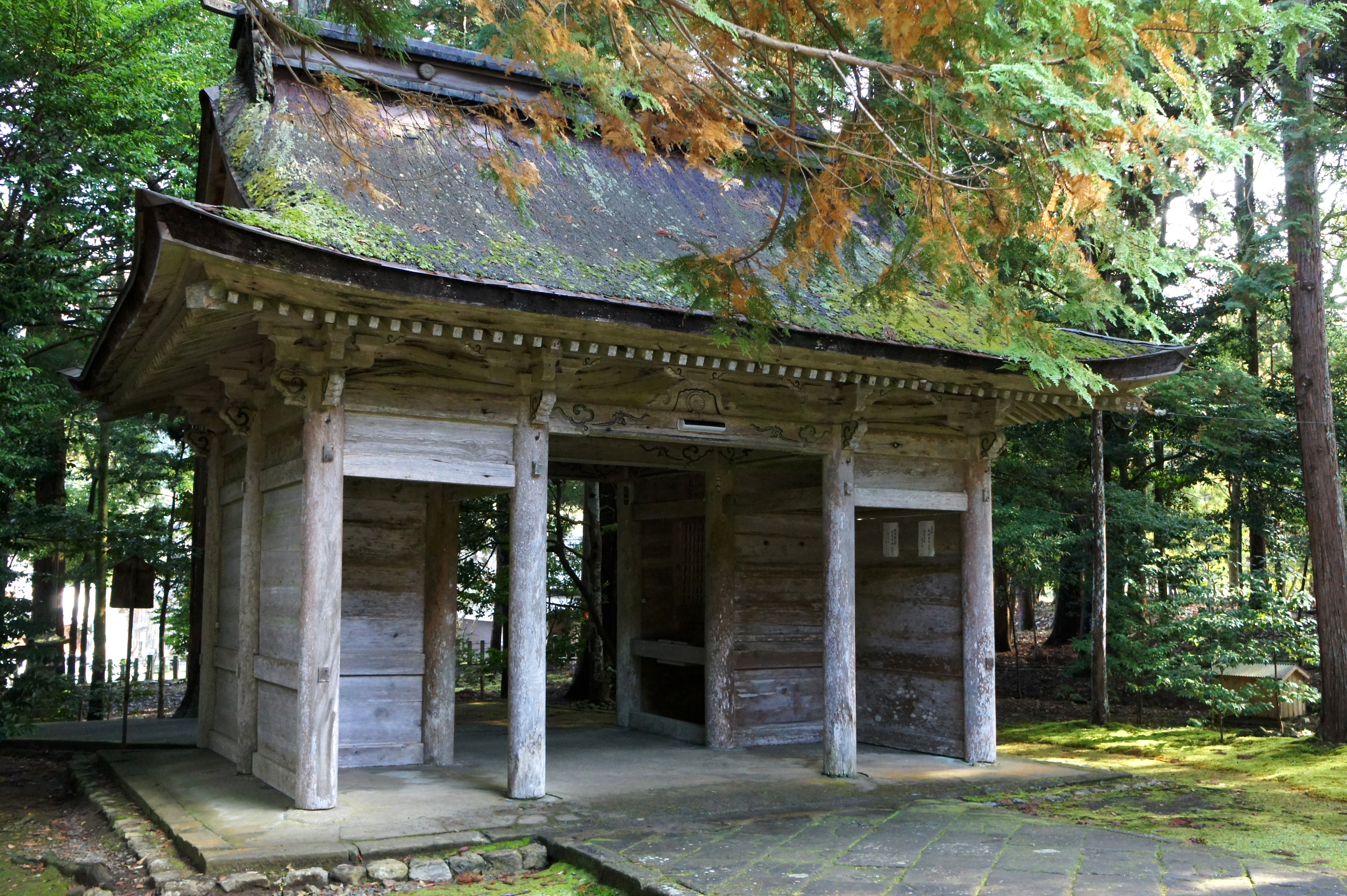
Rōmon

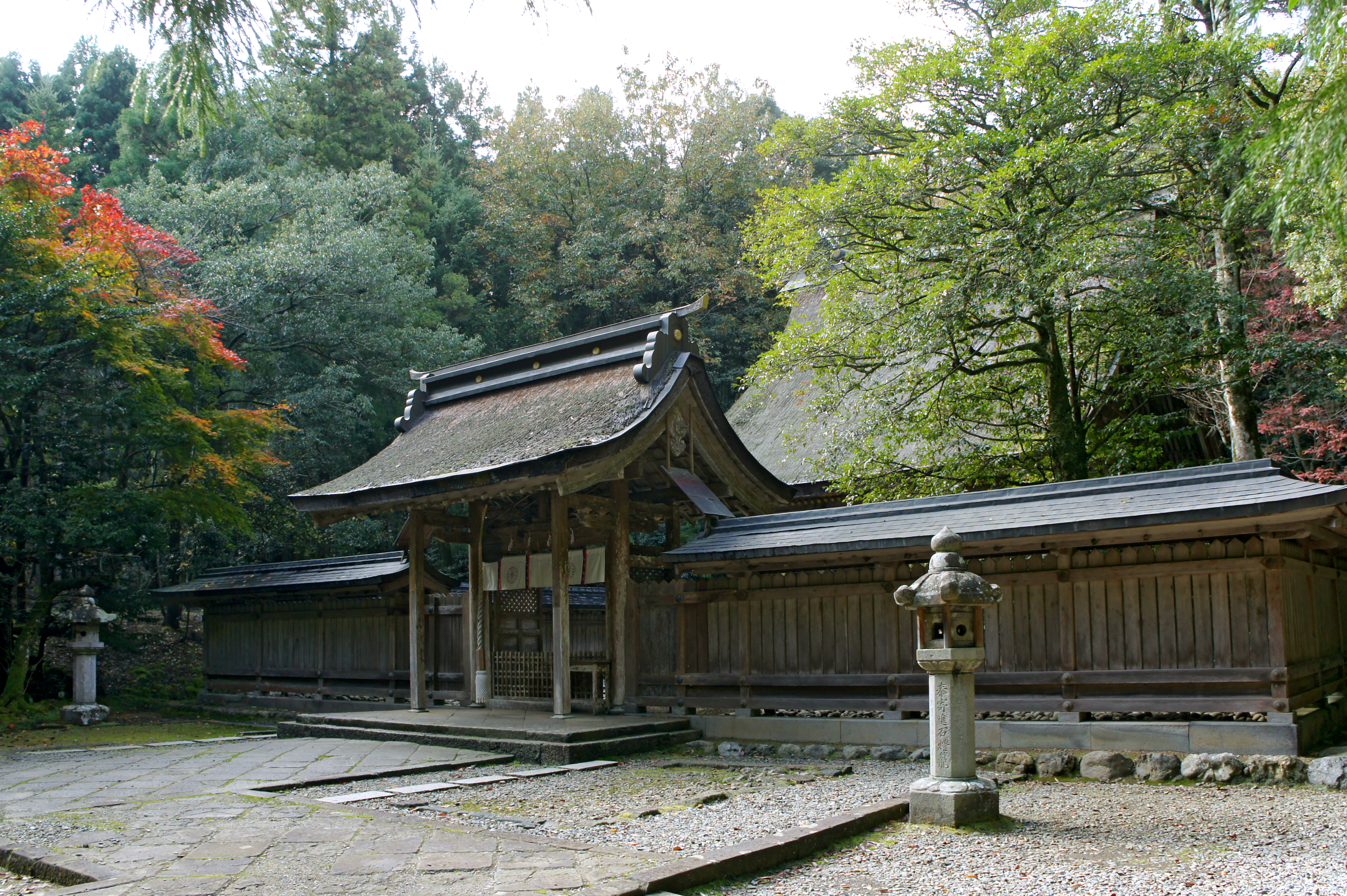
Gate

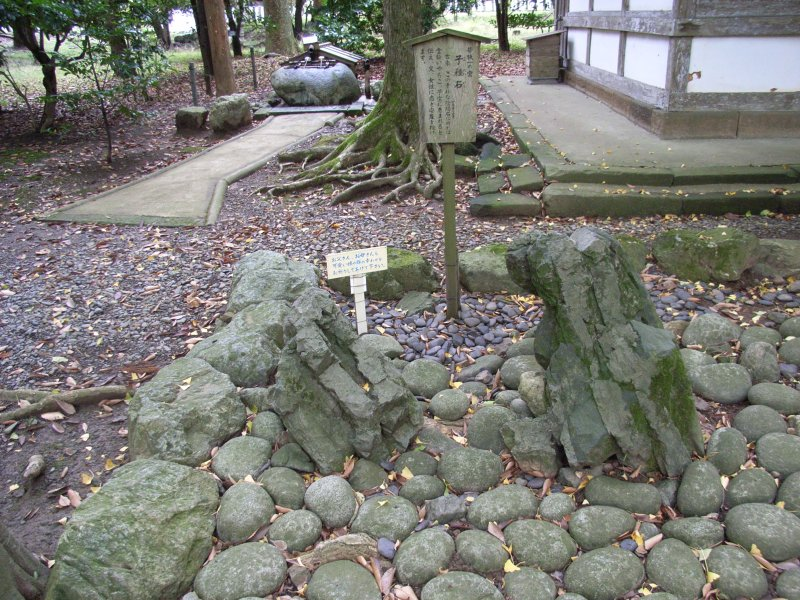
Yin-Yang stone

=== Wakasahime Jinja (Lower shrine) ===
- Honden – Edo Period (1802) Fukui Prefectural Tangible Cultural Property
- Romon (Zuishin-mon) – Edo Period (1743), Fukui Prefectural Tangible Cultural Property
- Shinmon Gate – Edo Period (1803) Fukui Prefectural Tangible Cultural Property
- Noh Stage
- Shaso – Fukui Prefectural Tangible Cultural Property
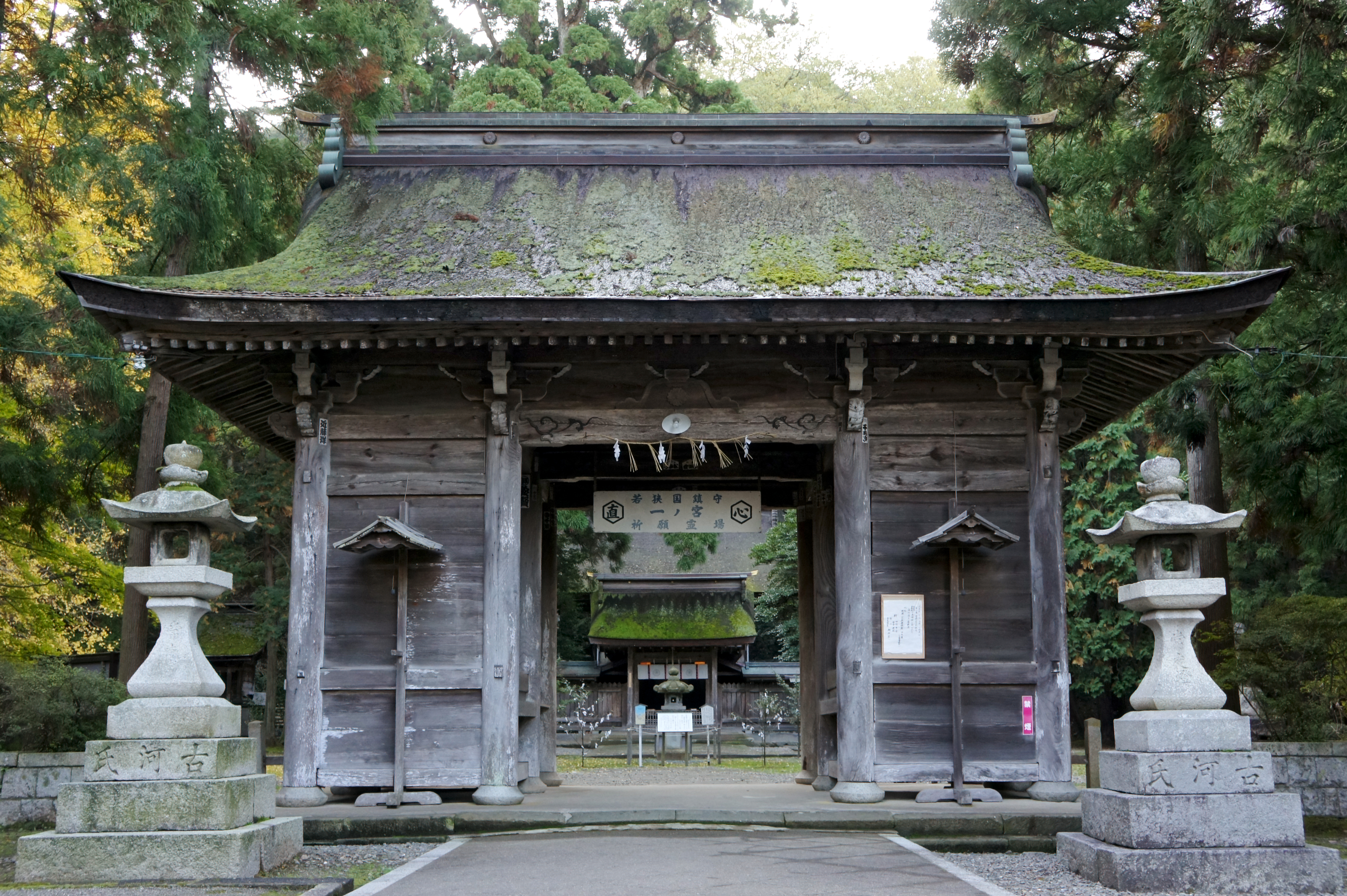
Romon

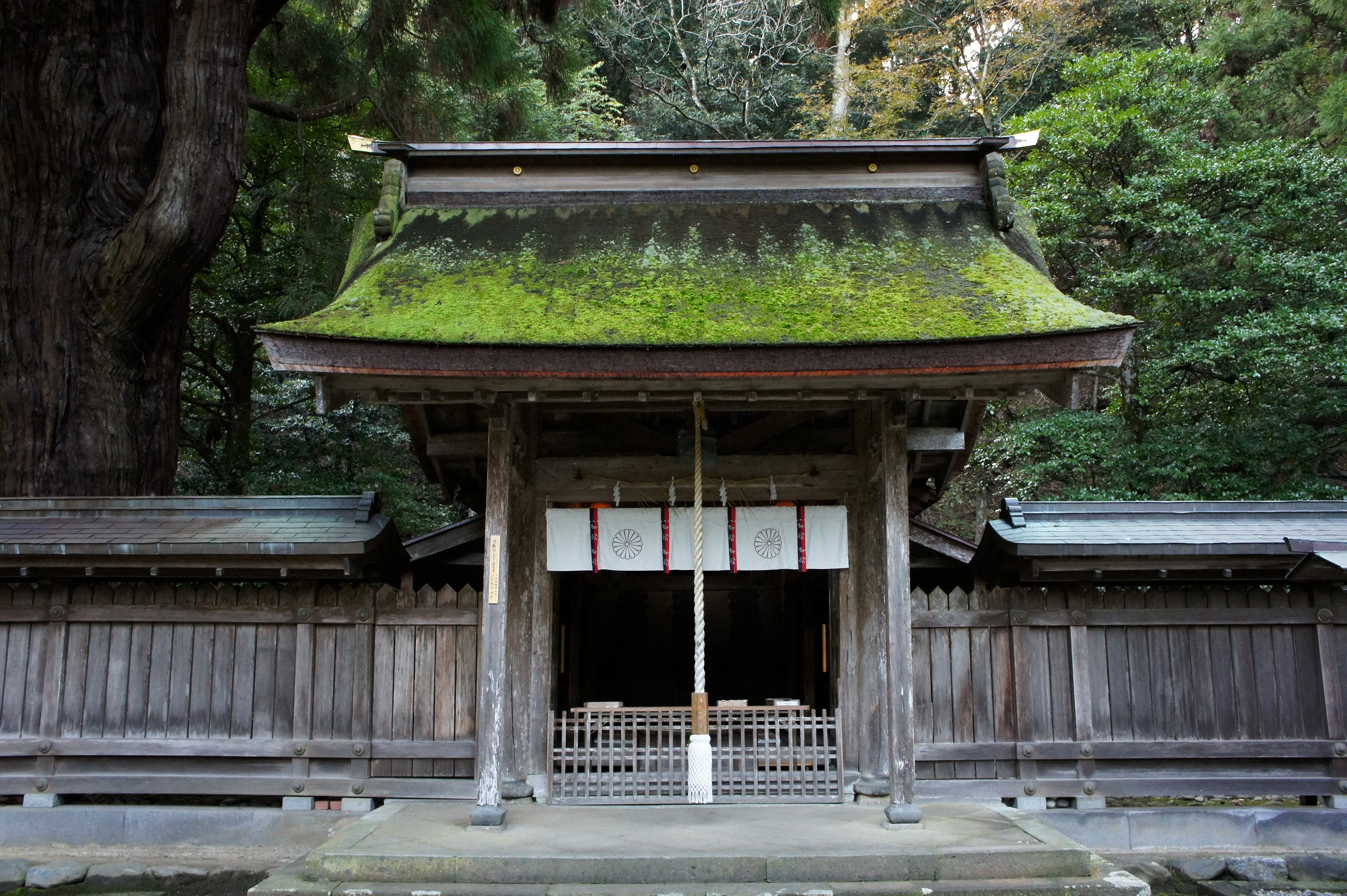
Gate

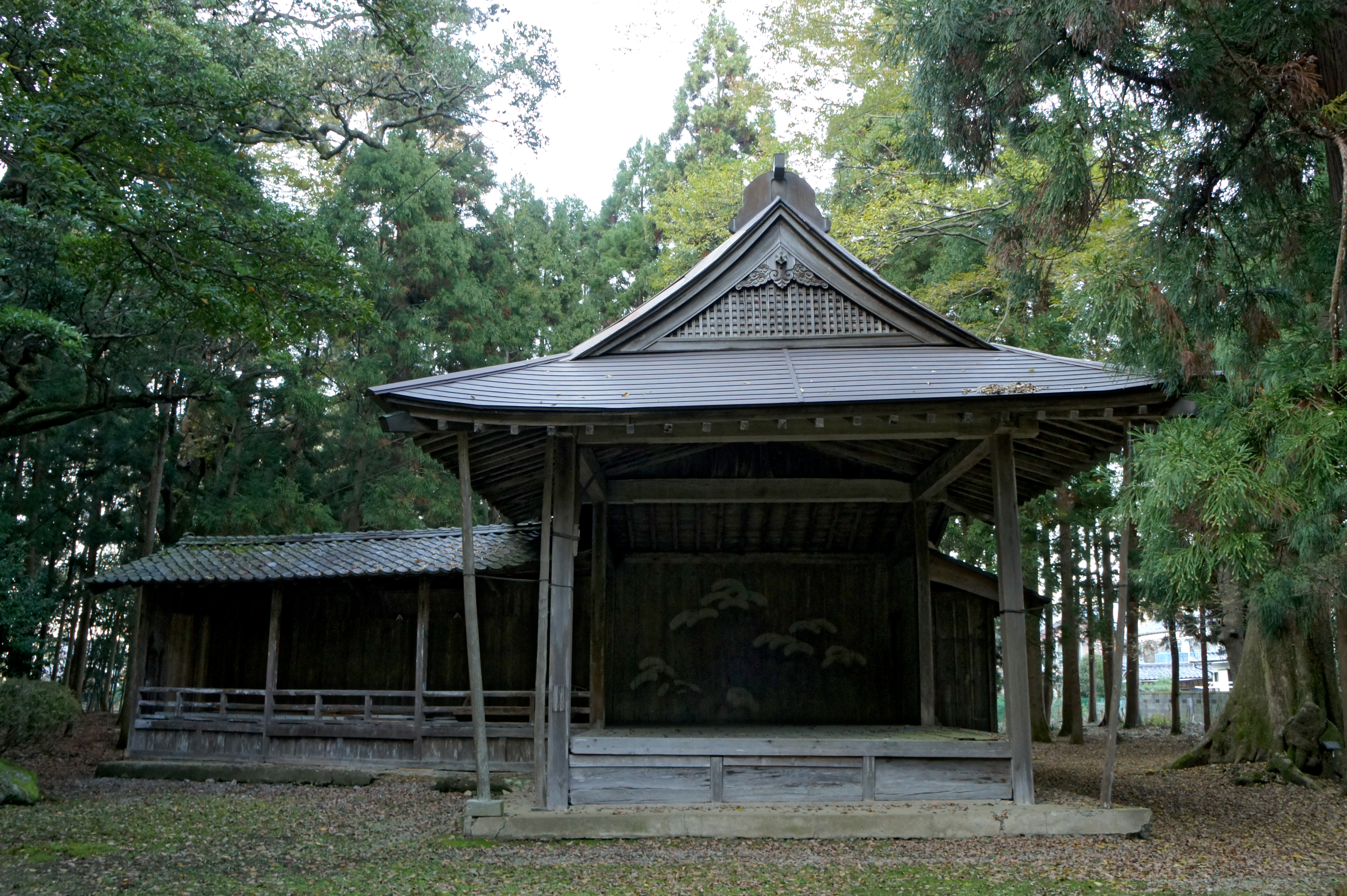
Noh stage

The Wakasahiko Jinja is located a 30-minute walk and the Wakasahime Jinja a ten-minute walk from Higashi-Obama Station on the JR West Obama Line.

== Cultural Properties ==
=== National Important Cultural Properties ===
- Norito Shidai (詔戸次第（乾元二年卯月廿一日）), Kamakura period (1303); Norito are Shinto prayers. The Norito Shidai is a scroll with seven pages, 30.1 by 339.6-cm, made from Hishi paper and with a dark brown floral damask cover (added after the Edo period). The main text is in the style of a decree, with a mix of katakana and return dots and red periods within the text, and dense side readings are annotated throughout in the same stroke. The contents center on the imperial offerings made to Wakasahiko Daimyojin by the Wakasa provincial governor and local officials, as well as offerings for the shrine's annual festival, the monthly first-day festival, and the imperial offerings from envoys on the Hokuriku road, conveying the full scope of Wakasa Province's religious ceremonies in the Middle Ages. The text includes the dates Kencho 7 (1255) for the annual festival prayer and Kenryaku 2 (1212) for the provincial governor's worship prayer, and the date Kengen 2 (1303) inscribed at the end of the volume likely indicates when these were compiled and transcribed.

== See also ==
- List of Shinto shrines
- Ichinomiya
