= Omaha Township =

Omaha Township may refer to:

- Omaha Township, Boone County, Arkansas
- Omaha Township, Gallatin County, Illinois
- Omaha Township, Thurston County, Nebraska
