= Esaki Station =

Railway station in Hagi, Yamaguchi Prefecture, Japan

Esaki Station 江崎駅
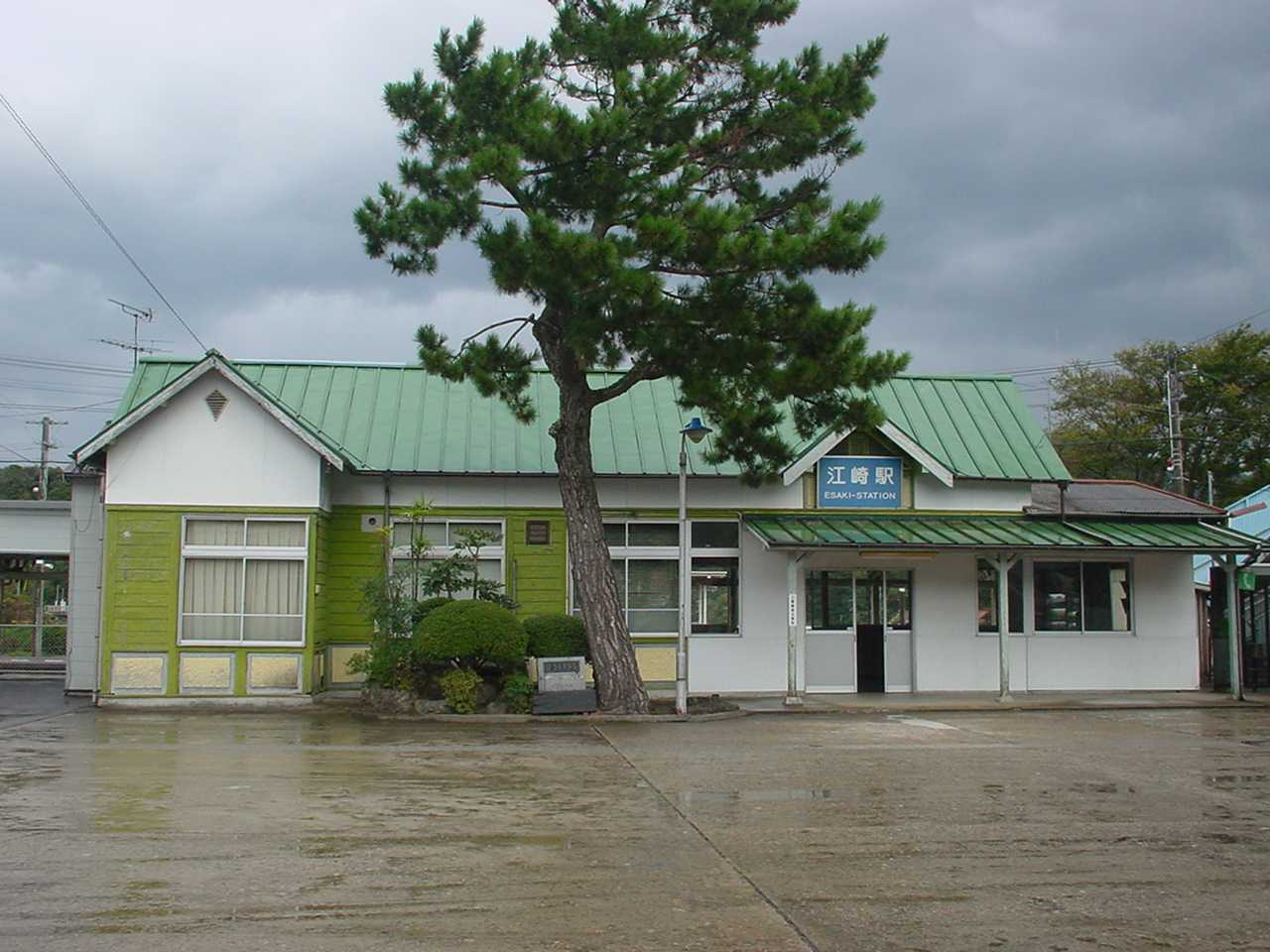
- Esaki Station in October 2005

General information
- Location: 1319 Shimotama, Hagi-shi, Yamaguchi-ken 759-3112; Japan
- Coordinates: 34°38′17.33″N 131°39′42.86″E
- Owner: West Japan Railway Company
- Operator: West Japan Railway Company
- Line: San'in Main Line
- Distance: 533.8 km (331.7 miles) from Kyoto
- Platforms: 2 side platforms
- Tracks: 2
- Connections: Bus stop

Other information
- Status: Unstaffed
- Website: Official website

History
- Opened: 25 March 1928; 98 years ago

Passengers
- FY2020: 33

Services
Preceding station	JR West	Following station
Susa towards Shimonoseki	San'in Main Line E Local	Iinoura towards Masuda
Location
- Location within Yamaguchi Prefecture Location within Japan

Esaki Station (江崎駅, Esaki--eki) is a passenger railway station located in the city of Hagi, Yamaguchi Prefecture, Japan. It is operated by the West Japan Railway Company (JR West).

== Lines ==
Esaki Station is served by the JR West San'in Main Line, and is located 533.8 kilometers from the terminus of the line at Kyoto. Only local trains stop at this station.

== Station layout ==
The station consists of two ground-level opposed side platforms connected to the station building by a footbridge. The station is unattended.

== Platforms ==
station side	■ San'in Main Line	for Masuda and Hamada
opposite side	■ San'in Main Line	for Higashi-Hagi and Nagatoshi

== History ==
Esaki Station was opened as a terminal station of the Japan Government Railways San'in Main Line when the line was extended from Iinoura Station on 25 March 1928. The line was further extended to Utagō Station on 24 February 1933. Freight operations were discontinued on 1 March 1979. With the privatization of the Japan National Railway (JNR) on 1 April 1987, the station came under the aegis of the West Japan railway Company (JR West). The station was out of operation from 28 July 2013 to 10 August 2014 due to damage to the line caused by torrential rains.

== Passenger statistics ==
In fiscal 2020, the station was used by an average of 33 passengers daily.

== Surrounding area ==
- Ezaki Port
- Hagi City Tamangawa General Office (Former Tamanagawa Town Hall)

== See also ==
- List of railway stations in Japan
