= Nathan D. Bryant =

American politician

- Born: November 28, 1869; Gallatin County, Illinois, United States
- Died: January 25, 1949 (aged 79)
- Education: Hayward College
- Occupations: educator, politician
- Known for: member, Illinois House of Representatives
- Notable work: head of agriculture education at Lindsey Wilson College
- Political party: Populist

Nathan D. Bryant (November 28, 1869 – January 25, 1949) was an American educator and politician. He served as a Populist member of the Illinois House of Representatives.

== Biography ==
Nathan D. Bryant was born in Gallatin County, Illinois on November 28, 1869. He taught school for a seven-year period with an interruption to attend Hayward College in Fairfield, Illinois. At age 21, he was elected the town clerk for his native town of Omaha, Illinois. He ran for Gallatin County Superintendent of Schools as the nominee of the Populist Party, but lost. In the 1896 general election, he was elected, as a Populist, on a Democratic-Populist fusion ticket. During his time in the General Assembly, he was a member of the Farmers' Mutual Benefit Association. He was not reelected to the Illinois House. He returned to education.

He died on January 25, 1949. At the time of his death, he was the head of agriculture education at Lindsey Wilson College.
