= Kohama =

Kohama (小浜, 小濵 or 粉浜) may refer to:

== Locations ==
- Kohama-chō (小浜町), an area of Toyohashi in Japan
- Kohama-gobo, one of the names of Gosho-ji, a Buddhist temple in Takarazuka, Hyōgo Prefecture, Japan
- Kohamajima, an island which is part of the town of Taketomi, Okinawa, Japan

== People ==
- Hidehiro Kohama (小浜英博 or 小濵 英博), a popular news and sports announcer on Sun Television in Japan
- Mototaka Kohama (小浜元孝) (1932–2017), a Japanese basketball player and head coach who took his team to the world championships three times
- Satoru Kohama, a Lt. Commander and CO of the Japanese destroyer Hatsushimo (1933) during World War II
- Unabara Ohama Kohama (海原お浜・小浜), a Japanese manzai duo which had a TV variety show in the early 1970s

== Transportation ==
- Higashi-Kohama Station, a station on the Hankai Line in Osaka and Sakai, Osaka Prefecture, Japan
- Kohama Station, a station on the Nankai Main Line in Nishinari-ku, Osaka
- Toda-Kohama Station (戸田小浜駅), a station on the JR West Sanin Main Line in Toda, Masuda, Shimane Prefecture, Japan

== Other ==
- Kohama style, a school of sake making in the former Settsu Province of Japan

== See also ==
- Obama (disambiguation) and Ohama (disambiguation) for the word written in Japanese with the same kanji 小浜, but pronounced Obama or Ohama
