= Iinoura Station =

Railway station in Matsuda, Shimane Prefecture, Japan

Iinoura Station 飯浦駅
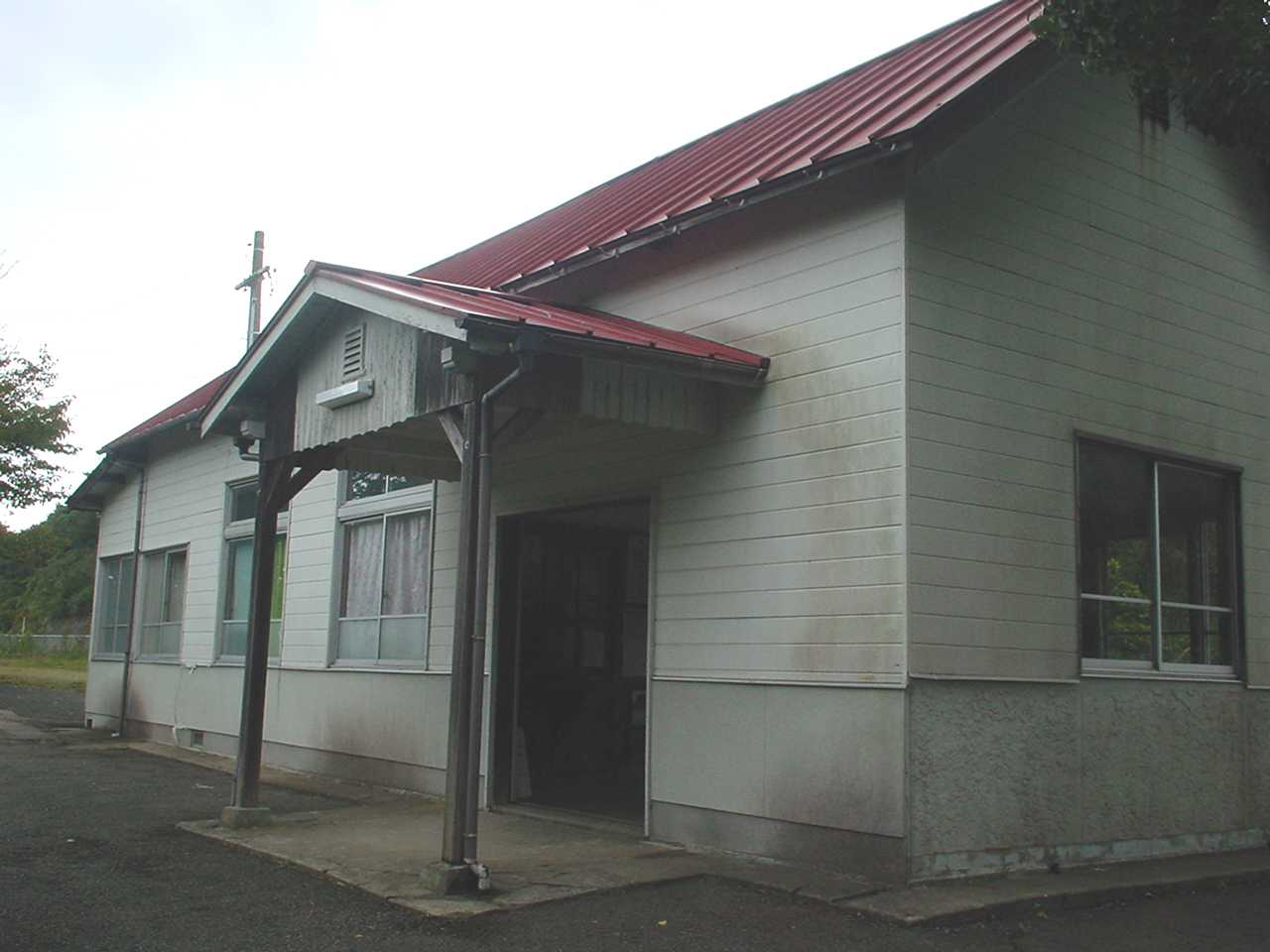
- Iinoura Station building, October 2005

General information
- Location: 233 Iinoura-chō, Masuda-shi, Shimane-ken 699-3761; Japan
- Coordinates: 34°40′8.06″N 131°42′7.57″E
- Owner: West Japan Railway Company
- Operator: West Japan Railway Company
- Line: San'in Main Line
- Distance: 528.0 km (328.1 miles) from Kyoto
- Platforms: 1 side platform
- Tracks: 1
- Connections: Bus stop

Other information
- Status: Unstaffed
- Website: Official website

History
- Opened: 19 June 1926; 100 years ago

Passengers
- FY2020: 2

Services
| Preceding station | JR West | Following station |
|---|---|---|
| Esaki towards Shimonoseki | San'in Main Line E Local | Toda-Kohama towards Masuda |
Location
- Location within Shimane Prefecture Location within Japan

Iinoura Station (飯浦駅, Iinoura-eki) is a passenger railway station located in the city of Masuda, Shimane Prefecture, Japan. It is operated by the West Japan Railway Company (JR West).

== Lines ==
Iinoura Station is served by the JR West San'in Main Line, and is located 528.0 kilometers from the terminus of the line at Kyoto. Only local trains stop at this station.

== Station layout ==
The station consists of one side platform serving a single bi-directional track. There is a waiting room on the platform. There used to be an old wooden station building, but it has now been dismantled and only the station name signboard and warehouse remain on the site. The station is unattended.

== History ==
Iinoura Station was opened as a terminal station of the Japan Government Railways San'in Main Line when the line was extended from Toda-Kohama Station on 19 June 1927. The line was further extended to Susa Station on 25 March 1928. Freight operations were discontinued on 1 October 1962. With the privatization of the Japan National Railway (JNR) on 1 April 1987, the station came under the aegis of the West Japan railway Company (JR West). The station was out of operation from 28 July 2013 to 9 November 2013 due to damage to the line caused by torrential rains.

== Passenger statistics ==
In fiscal 2020, the station was used by an average of 2 passengers daily.

== Surrounding area ==
The station is located on a slightly elevated inland area in the fishing village of Iiura.

- Maruzaki and Matsushima Magnetic Rocks (Prefectural Natural Monument)
- Iiura fishing port

== Film location ==
Iinoura Station was used as the location for the fictional Kazemachi Station (風町駅) in the 2006 Japanese film Tabi no Okurimono 0:00 Hatsu.

== See also ==
- List of railway stations in Japan
