= Todakohama Station =

Railway station in Matsuda, Shimane Prefecture, Japan

Todakohama Station 戸田小浜駅
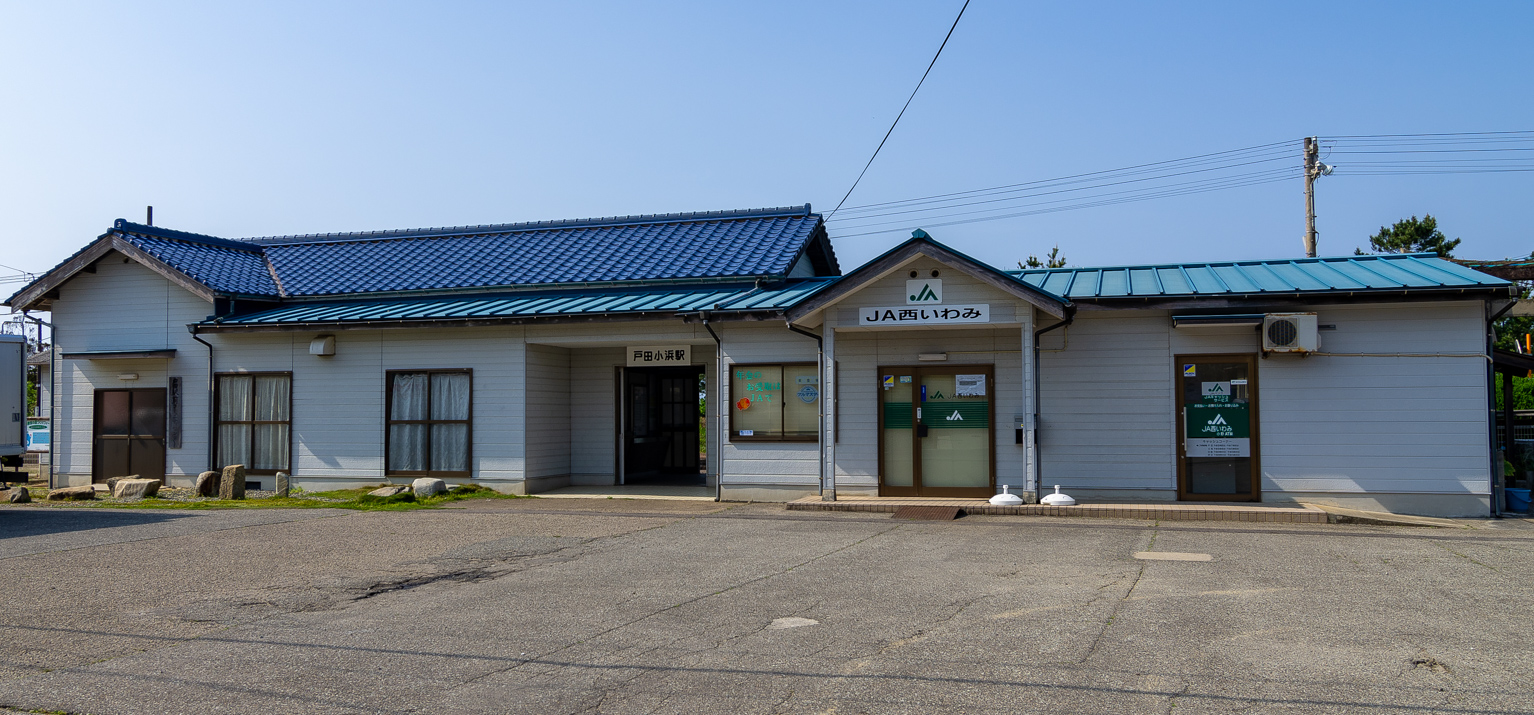
- Todakohama Station, May 2012

General information
- Location: 596 Toda-chō, Masuda-shi, Shimane-ken 699-3763; Japan
- Coordinates: 34°40′23.3″N 131°44′16.27″E
- Owner: West Japan Railway Company
- Operator: West Japan Railway Company
- Line: San'in Main Line
- Distance: 524.3 km (325.8 miles) from Kyoto
- Platforms: 1 side + 1 island platform
- Tracks: 3
- Connections: Bus stop

Construction
- Structure type: At grade

Other information
- Status: Unstaffed
- Website: Official website

History
- Opened: 8 March 1925; 101 years ago
- Former names: Iwami-Kohama (until 1925)

Passengers
- FY2020: 9

Services
| Preceding station | JR West | Following station |
|---|---|---|
| Iinoura towards Shimonoseki | San'in Main Line E Local | Masuda Terminus |
Location
- Location within Shimane Prefecture Location within Japan

Todakohama Station (戸田小浜駅, Todakohama-eki) is a passenger railway station located in the city of Masuda, Shimane Prefecture, Japan. It is operated by the West Japan Railway Company (JR West).

== Lines ==
Todakohama Station is served by the JR West San'in Main Line, and is located 524.3 kilometers from the terminus of the line at Kyoto. Only local trains stop at this station.

== Station layout ==
The station consists of one side platform and one island platform. The platforms are unnumbered. The station building still exists, but used as a community center and offices for the JA Nishi Iwami Nakanishi Branch, and has no facilities such as automatic ticket vending machines. The station building is located adjacent to the platform where the outbound train arrives and departs, and is connected by a footbridge to the island platform. The station is unattended.

== Platforms ==
| station side (side platform) | ■ San'in Main Line | for Higashi-Hagi and Nagatoshi |
| opposite side island platform) | ■ San'in Main Line | for Masuda and Hamada |

== History ==
Todakohama Station was opened as a terminal station of the Japan Government Railways San'in Main Line when the line was extended from Masuda Station on 8 March 1925. It was originally named Iwami-Kohama Station (見小浜駅), but the name was changed to Todakohama Station on 1 November of the same year. The line was further extended to Susa Station on 19 June 1927. Freight operations were discontinued on 1 February 1963. With the privatization of the Japan National Railway (JNR) on 1 April 1987, the station came under the aegis of the West Japan railway Company (JR West). The station was out of operation from 28 July 2013 to 9 November 2013 due to damage to the line caused by torrential rains.

== Passenger statistics ==
In fiscal 2020, the station was used by an average of 9 passengers daily.

== Surrounding area ==
- Masuda Municipal Ono Junior High School
- Japan National Route 191
- Toda Kakimoto Shrine

== See also ==
- List of railway stations in Japan
