= Obama Nishi Interchange =

Coordinates: 35°28′41″N 135°39′29″E

Obama-nishi Interchange
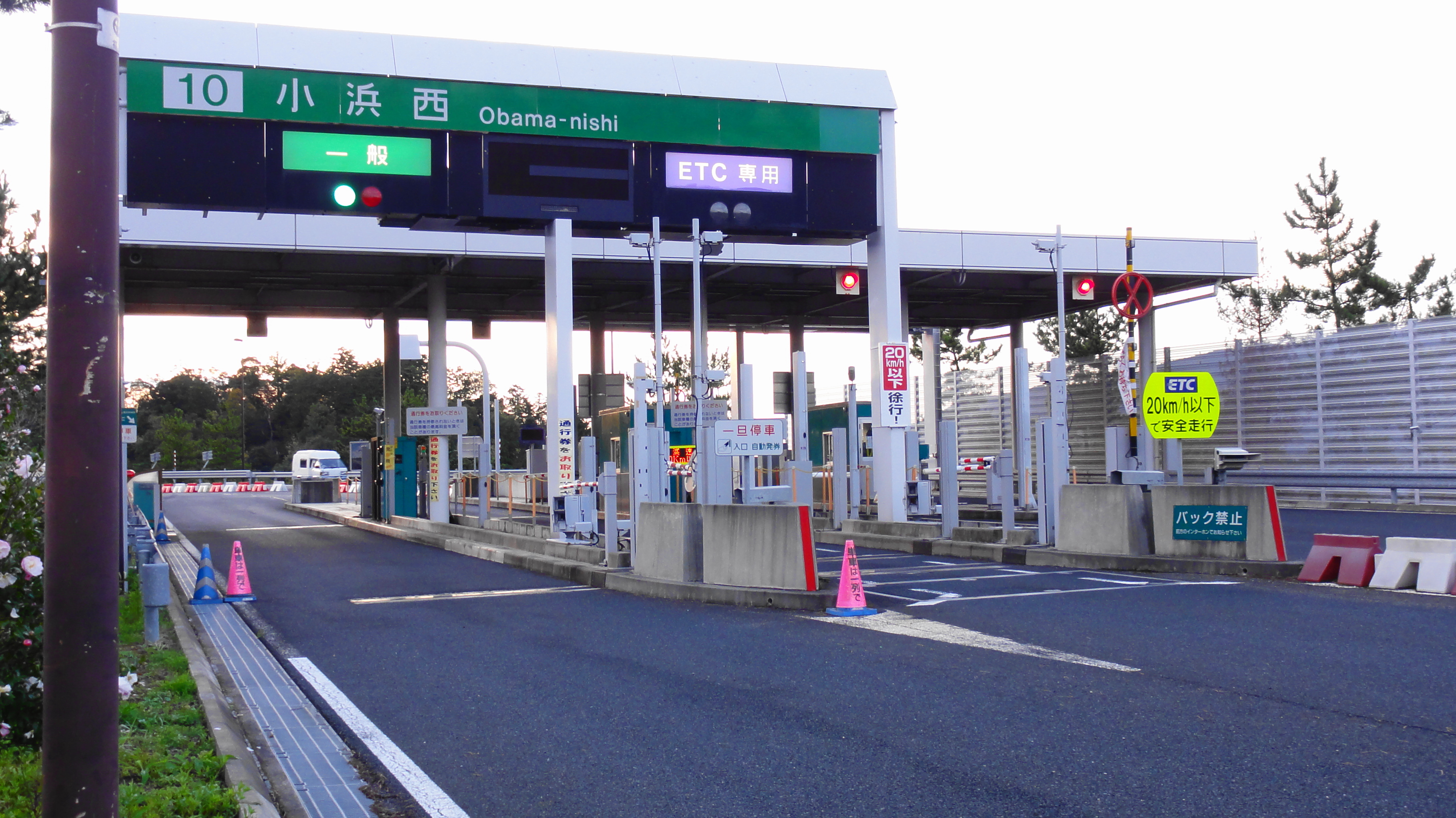
- Obama-nishi IC

Location
- Okazu, Obama, Fukui Prefecture
- Roads at junction: Maizuru-Wakasa Expressway; National Route 27

Construction
- Type: Directional interchange
- Tolls: Yes

The Obama-nishi Interchange (小浜西インターチェンジ, Obama Nishi Intāchenji), or Obama-nishi IC (小浜西IC), is an interchange located in Okazu, Obama, Fukui Prefecture, Japan. It is the #10 interchange on and the terminus of the Maizuru-Wakasa Expressway, operated by the West Nippon Expressway Company (NEXCO). There are plans to extend the expressway beyond the Obama Nishi Interchange.

== History ==
- 9 March 2003: The Obama-nishi Interchange opens at the same time as the Maizuru-Wakasa Expressway

== Environs ==
- JR West Kato Station (Obama Line)
- Kato Post Office
- Ministop Kato Store
- Kinki Hiking Trail
- Okazu Saltworks Ruins
- Koikawa Beach

=== Highway access ===
- National Route 27
