= Omaha Township, Gallatin County, Illinois =

Omaha Township
- Township
- Location in Gallatin County

- Gallatin County's location in Illinois
- Coordinates: 37°52′53″N 88°18′44″W
- Country: United States
- State: Illinois
- County: Gallatin
- Established: November 5, 1890

Area
  - Total: 18.65 sq mi (48.3 km^{2})
  - Land: 18.60 sq mi (48.2 km^{2})
  - Water: 0.05 sq mi (0.13 km^{2}) 0.27%
- Elevation: 371 ft (113 m)

Population (2020)
  - Total: 406
  - Density: 21.8/sq mi (8.43/km^{2})
- Time zone: UTC-6 (CST)
  - Summer (DST): UTC-5 (CDT)
- ZIP codes: 62869, 62871
- FIPS code: 17-059-56016

Omaha Township is one of ten townships in Gallatin County, Illinois. As of the 2020 census, its population was 406 and it contained 206 housing units.

== Geography ==
According to the 2021 census gazetteer files, Omaha Township has a total area of 18.65 square miles (48.30 km^{2}), of which 18.60 square miles (48.17 km^{2}) (or 99.73%) is land and 0.05 square miles (0.13 km^{2}) (or 0.27%) is water.

=== Cities, towns, villages ===
- Omaha

=== Cemeteries ===
The township contains these six cemeteries: Adkin, Palestine Number 1, Palestine Number 2, Poplar, Shane and Shaw.

=== Major highways ===
- U.S. Route 45
- Illinois Route 1

== Demographics ==
As of the 2020 census there were 406 people, 179 households, and 136 families residing in the township. The population density was 21.77 inhabitants per square mile (8.41/km^{2}). There were 206 housing units at an average density of 11.04 per square mile (4.26/km^{2}). The racial makeup of the township was 96.06% White, 0.00% African American, 0.00% Native American, 0.25% Asian, 0.00% Pacific Islander, 0.00% from other races, and 3.69% from two or more races. Hispanic or Latino of any race were 0.00% of the population.

There were 179 households, out of which 46.90% had children under the age of 18 living with them, 66.48% were married couples living together, 9.50% had a female householder with no spouse present, and 24.02% were non-families. 24.00% of all households were made up of individuals, and 11.20% had someone living alone who was 65 years of age or older. The average household size was 2.69 and the average family size was 3.23.

The township's age distribution consisted of 27.2% under the age of 18, 7.3% from 18 to 24, 24.3% from 25 to 44, 24.9% from 45 to 64, and 16.4% who were 65 years of age or older. The median age was 35.3 years. For every 100 females, there were 138.6 males. For every 100 females age 18 and over, there were 107.7 males.

The median income for a household in the township was $66,250, and the median income for a family was $69,722. Males had a median income of $40,625 versus $25,000 for females. The per capita income for the township was $25,836. About 7.4% of families and 9.1% of the population were below the poverty line, including 6.9% of those under age 18 and 12.7% of those age 65 or over.

Historical population
Census	Pop.	Note	%±
2000	466		—
2010	499		7.1%
2020	406		−18.6%
U.S. Decennial Census

== School districts ==
- Eldorado Community Unit School District 4
- Gallatin Community Unit School District 7
- Norris City-Omaha-Enfield Community Unit School District 3

== Political districts ==
- Illinois's 15th congressional district
- State House District 118
- State Senate District 59
