= Dinner with Osama =

2008 short story collection by Marilyn Krysl

- First edition cover
- Author: Marilyn Krysl
- Publisher: University of Notre Dame Press
- Publication date: February 1, 2008
- ISBN: 978-0-268-03318-7

Dinner With Osama is a 2008 short story collection by American author Marilyn Krysl. The collection won the 2008 Richard Sullivan award for short fiction from the University of Notre Dame.
