= FlowBack =

Japanese boy band

- Origin: Japan
- Genres: J-pop, R&B, electro pop, hip hop
- Years active: November 2013–2025
- Labels: Ki/oon Music
- Members: Masaharu; Tatsuki; Mark; Reiji; Judai
- Website: www.flowback05.com

FlowBack was a five-member Japanese boy band comprising Tatsuki, Judai, Masaharu, Mark and Reiji, signed to Ki/oon Music. In 2013, they auditioned and the next year they took part in the biggest audition of the nation, Line Audition, involving 125k groups, and were chosen as one of the eight finalists, which gained them attention. Between the years 2017-18, FlowBack was able to come back with fresher beats and modern day J-Pop/Hip-hop music which made them stand out in a more unique way for today's audience.

Since their debut with "Come a Long Way", they have had hits in the weekly Oricon charts and have gone on to release a full album.

They disbanded on August 1, 2025.

== Discography ==
=== Albums ===
==== Studio albums ====
Title	Album details	Peak chart positions	
Title	Album details	JPN	JPN Physical
Versus	Release: May 1, 2017; Labels: Ki/oon Music; Formats: CD, digital download	9	7
Do Not Hesitate	Release: June 19, 2019; Labels: Ki/oon Music; Formats: CD, digital download	TBA	7

=== Extended plays ===
List of extended plays, with selected chart positions
Title	Extended play details	Peaks
Title	Extended play details	JPN Physical
FlowBack 1st Demo CD	Released: 2015; Label: Self-released; Format: CD	—
Shake the World	Released: January 15, 2016; Label: sambafree; Format: CD	50

=== Singles ===
==== As lead artist ====
Title	Year	Peak chart positions		Certifications	Album
Title	Year	JPN	JPN Physical	Certifications	Album
"AfterRain"	2016	83	16		Versus
"Come a Long Way"	2016	41	8		Versus
"Heartbreaker"	2016	33	11		Versus
"Booyah!"	2017	18	6		Versus
"We Are!"	2017		19		Do Not Hesitate
"Breakout"/"Yuki Iro"	2017	9	9		Do Not Hesitate
"Always"	2018		10		Do Not Hesitate
"—" denotes a recording that did not chart or was not released in that territory.

== Members ==
Profile based on official website

Name	Birth Place	Birthday	Role(s)
Masaharu	Tokyo	May 20, 1991	Self composed lyrics and musics
Tatsuki	Aichi	February 21, 1994	Choreographer, Leader
Mark	Tokyo	May 15, 1994	Lyrics, Styling costumes
Reiji	Tokyo	April 28, 1994	Designing goods
Judai	Kanagawa	January 4, 1996	Rap
