= Fumitaro Ohama =

- Born: Fumitaro Ohama; 1971 (age 54–55); Tokyo, Japan
- Other names: Jake Ohama, Jake FR
- Education: University of Southern California
- Occupations: Internet Entrepreneur, Creative Director, Philanthropist

Fumitaro Ohama (大浜 史太郎, Ōhama Fumitarō; born 1971), is a Japanese internet entrepreneur and creative director who founded Japan's mega fashion show, "Tokyo Girls Collection". Ohama is also an animation director and the founder of RABBITWARREN ANIMATION STUDIOS, which created the popular animation channel "RABBITWARREN". Within a year of its YouTube launch, the channel surpassed 17 million subscribers and was awarded "Most Promising Animation Company in Asia 2024" by Asia Business Outlook.

Ohama also established Japan's first mega mobile site, "girlswalker.com," and "fashionwalker.com" in collaboration with Japan's major portal site, Yahoo! Japan (SoftBank Group). He became the president and CEO of Branding Inc. (former name as Xavel Inc.), a company owning 17 group companies. The annual sales of all the companies under his leadership exceeded 290 billion yen (US$270 million), which he later sold in 2011.

Ohama is also the producer and creative director of the fashion tournament "WORLD RUNWAY" and the art movement "UNCONDITIONABLE PROJECT.

== Biography ==
Fumitaro Ohama graduated from University of Southern California in 1997. During his study in USC, he produced a charity event for Great Hanshin earthquake in 1995 at USC and made donation to Kobe, which later leads to establishment of Kobe Collection, a fashion event to promote and rebuild Kobe city and economy.

He started working at Riviera Country Club (golf course at Los Angeles, CA)and became the chief project manager for "Nissan LA Open" and "US Senior Open 1998".

In 1999, Ohama started his first own company, Branding group for internet, fashion and wedding business in Japan, and also produced wedding of Ichiro Suzuki, MLB player of Miami Marlins.

In 2002, Ohama along with MBS (Mainichi Broadcasting System), proposed a semi-annual fashion event, Kobe Collection, to rebuild the local economy and city brand, which has been a long run event since the establishment.

In July 2005, Ohama initiated the Tokyo Girls Collection, Japan's mega fashion event. He also collaborated with GEISAI#9 of Takashi Murakami, contemporary artist, for later Tokyo Girls Collections. He also directed fashion and music collaboration event, Asia Girls Explosion, produced together with Yoshiki of X Japan. Today, the visitors of TGC has grown into 30,000 per day, 60,000 visitors for 2 days event. In 2011, he launched a new charity event series, WORLD RUNWAY Premiere in Singapore for Great East Japan Earthquake disaster and in 2015 for Kenya for local economy development.

He collaborated with various major companies such as SQUARE ENIX, SUMITOMO CORPORATION, and AOYAMA TRADING.

Ohama was awarded by many media such as Nikkei Internet award, HIGH-SERVICE BEST 300 and The 14th AMD award 2008 (contribution for digital industry in Japan) and others.

He is also introduced as the member of "Seven Samurai of New Japan Inc." by Reuters along with other notable Japanese companies such as DeNA, provider of mobile portal and e-commerce site and Yoshinoya, the major beef bowl restaurant.
