= Omaha, Illinois =

- Village
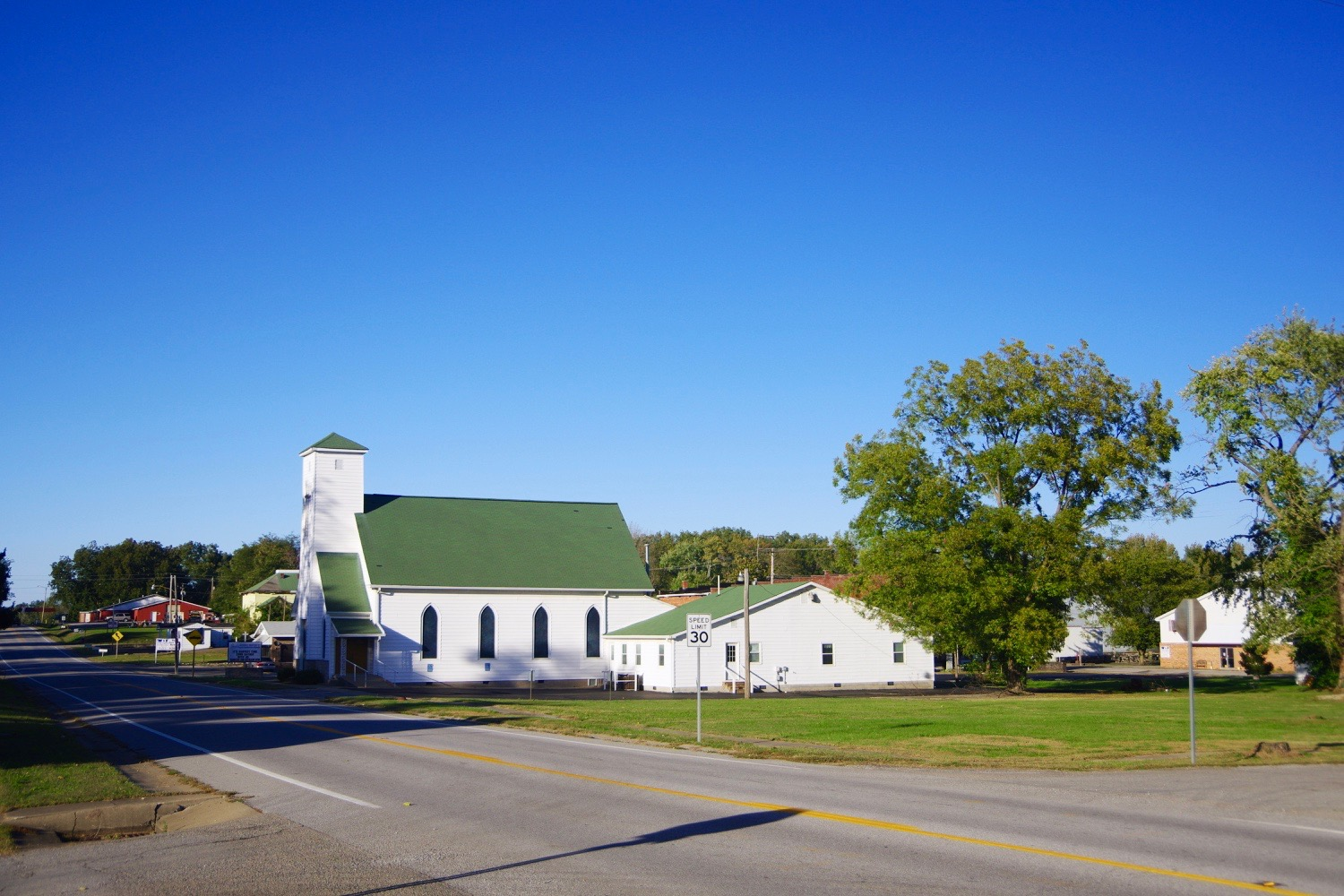
- Illinois Route 1 in Omaha

- Location of Omaha in Gallatin County, Illinois.
- Coordinates: 37°53′24″N 88°18′19″W
- Country: United States
- State: Illinois
- County: Gallatin
- Township: Omaha

Area
  - Total: 0.75 sq mi (1.93 km^{2})
  - Land: 0.75 sq mi (1.93 km^{2})
  - Water: 0 sq mi (0.00 km^{2})
- Elevation: 390 ft (120 m)

Population (2020)
  - Total: 209
  - Density: 281/sq mi (108.4/km^{2})
- Time zone: UTC-6 (CST)
  - Summer (DST): UTC-5 (CDT)
- ZIP code: 62871
- Area code: 618
- FIPS code: 17-56003
- GNIS ID: 2399573

Omaha is a village in Omaha Township, Gallatin County, Illinois, United States. The population was 209 at the 2020 census.

== History ==
Omaha was established in 1871 as a stop along the Springfield and Illinois South Eastern Railway. A baggage master working for the railroad, Henry Pearce, named the settlement for Omaha, Nebraska, where he had previously worked as a baggage master. After an initial attempt at incorporation failed in 1875, Omaha successfully incorporated in 1888.

Omaha is home to many strawberry farms and used to hold an annual "Strawberry Day" in May. In Southern Illinois, Omaha is well known for one of the area's largest and most popular furniture stores, "Omaha Furniture," which has been in business since 1932.

== Geography ==
Omaha is located in northwestern Gallatin County. Illinois Route 1 passes through the village, leading north 7 miles (11 km) to Norris City and south 32 miles (51 km) to Cave-in-Rock on the Ohio River. Shawneetown, the Gallatin County seat, is 16 miles (26 km) to the southeast via Routes 1 and 13.

According to the 2021 census gazetteer files, Omaha has a total area of 0.75 square miles (1.94 km^{2}), of which 0.74 square miles (1.92 km^{2}) (or 99.87%) is land and 0.00 square miles (0.00 km^{2}) (or 0.13%) is water.

== Demographics ==
Historical population
Census	Pop.	Note	%±
1880	187		—
1890	428		128.9%
1900	569		32.9%
1910	586		3.0%
1920	449		−23.4%
1930	358		−20.3%
1940	413		15.4%
1950	394		−4.6%
1960	312		−20.8%
1970	304		−2.6%
1980	295		−3.0%
1990	273		−7.5%
2000	263		−3.7%
2010	266		1.1%
2020	209		−21.4%
U.S. Decennial Census

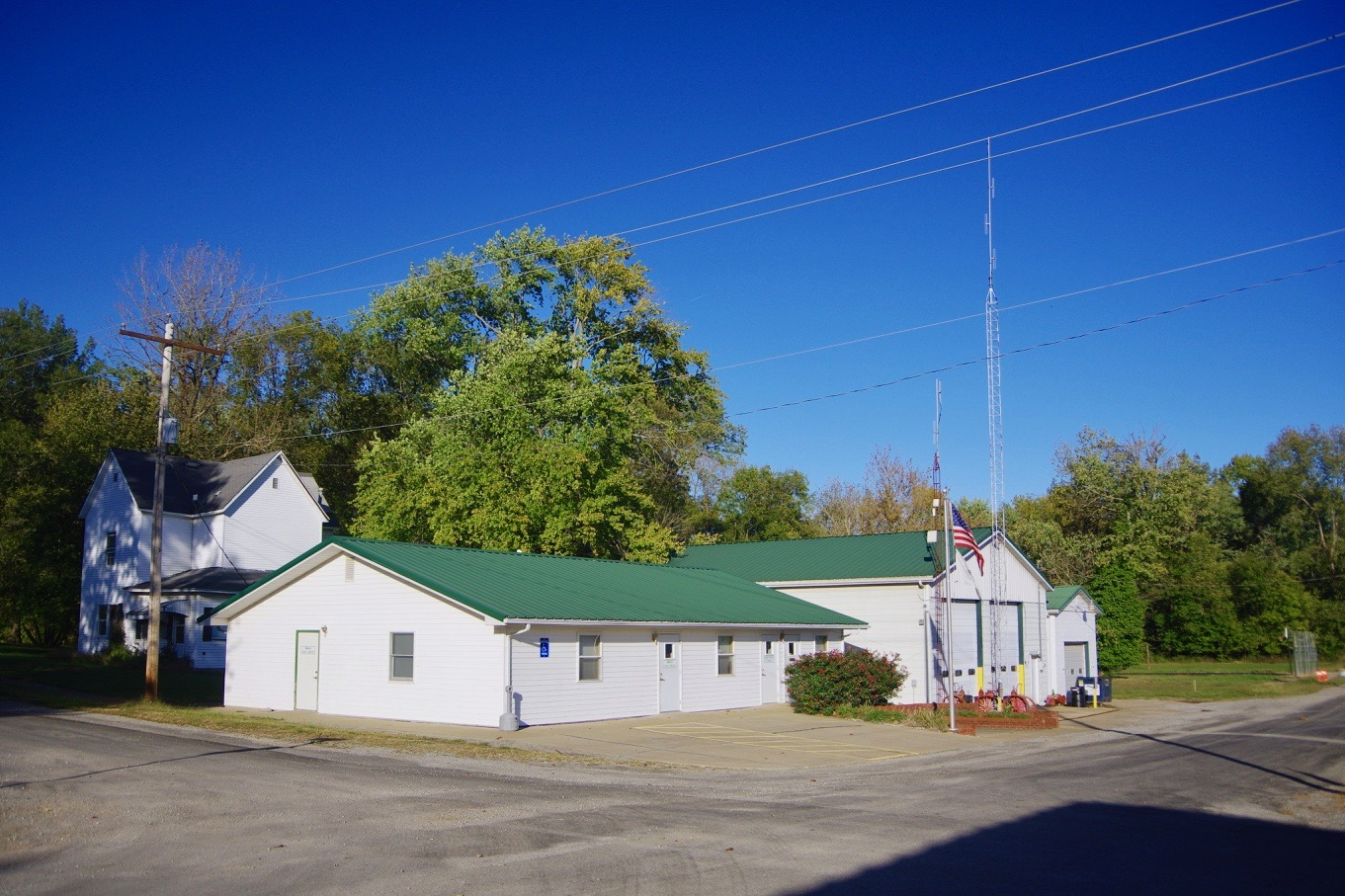
Omaha Village Hall

As of the 2020 census there were 209 people, 91 households. The population density was 280.54 inhabitants per square mile (108.32/km^{2}). There were 116 housing units at an average density of 155.70 per square mile (60.12/km^{2}). The racial makeup of the village was 95.22% White, 0.48% Asian, and 4.31% from two or more races.

The median income for a household in the village was $54,107, and the median income for a family was $71,250. About 14.9% of the population were below the poverty line, including 17.6% of those under age 18 and 12.3% of those age 65 or over.

== Notable people ==
- Nathan D. Bryant (1869–1949), member of the Illinois House of Representatives. He was a resident of Omaha during his political career.
