= Omaha, Virginia =

Unincorporated community in Virginia, United States

Coordinates: 37°05′51″N 82°26′05″W

Omaha is an unincorporated community in Dickenson County, Virginia, United States.

== History ==
A post office was established at Omaha in 1902, and remained in operation until it was discontinued in 1962. Omaha is derived from an Indian name meaning "upriver".
