= Higashi-Obama Station =

Railway station in Obama, Fukui Prefecture, Japan

Higashi-Obama Station 東小浜駅
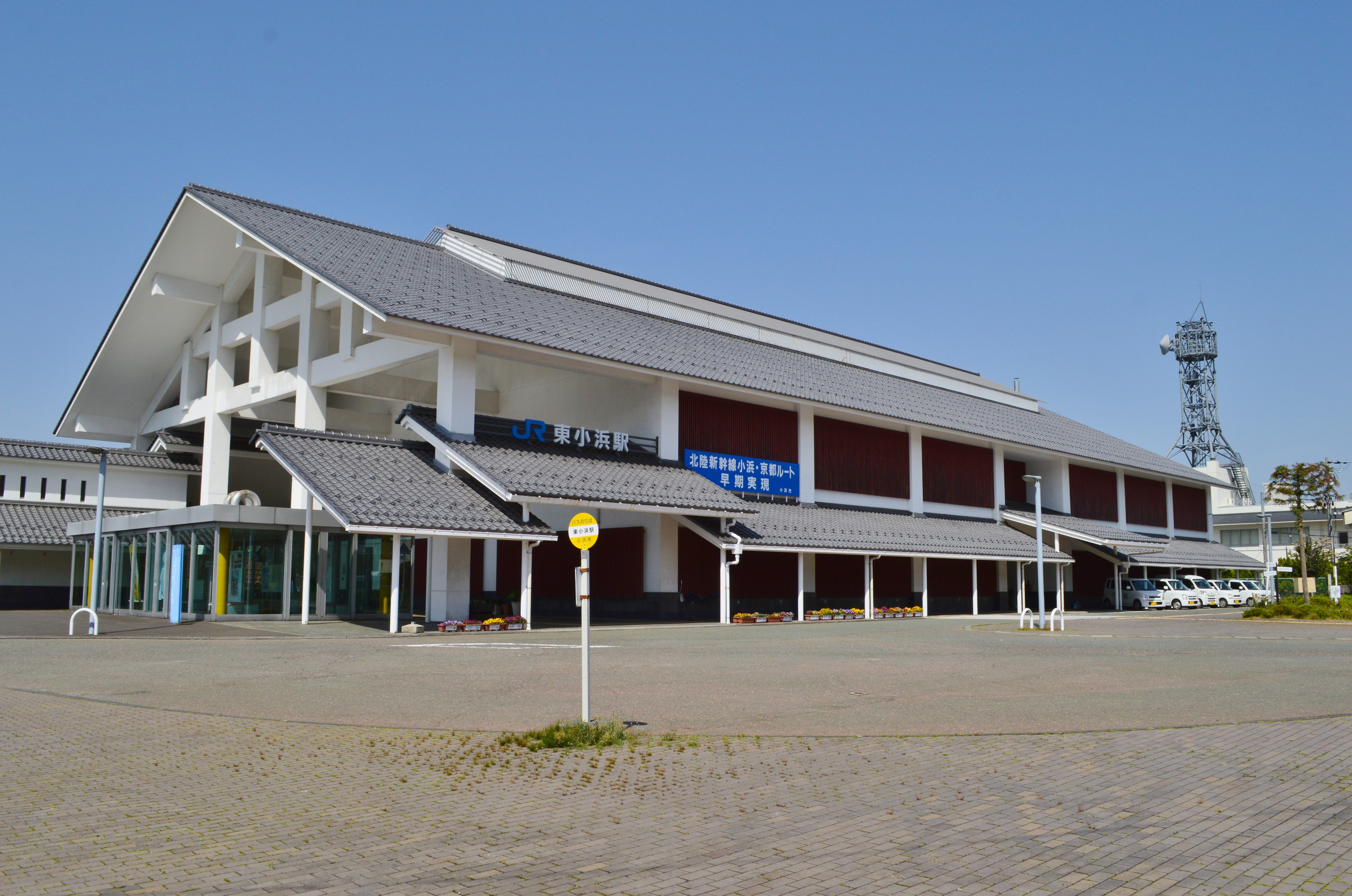
- Higashi-Obama Station in May 2017

Japanese name
- Shinjitai: 東小浜駅
- Kyūjitai: 東小濱驛
- Hiragana: ひがしおばまえき

General information
- Location: 8-15 Onyu, Obama City, Fukui Prefecture 917-0241; Japan
- Coordinates: 35°29′07″N 135°46′53″E
- Operator: JR West
- Line: Obama Line
- Distance: 46.2 km (28.7 mi) from Tsuruga
- Platforms: 1 side platform
- Tracks: 1

Construction
- Structure type: At grade

Other information
- Status: Staffed
- Website: Official website

History
- Opened: 14 August 1953; 73 years ago

Passengers
- FY 2023: 658 daily

Services
| Preceding station | JR West | Following station |
|---|---|---|
| Obama towards Higashi-Maizuru | Obama Line Local | Shin-Hirano towards Tsuruga |

Planned service in the future
| Preceding station | JR West | Following station |
|---|---|---|
| Kyōto towards Tsuruga | Hokuriku Shinkansen | Tsuruga towards Jōetsumyōkō |
Location
- Location within Fukui Prefecture Location within Kansai region Location within Japan

Higashi-Obama Station (東小浜駅, Higashi-Obama-eki) is a railway station on the Obama Line in the city of Obama, Fukui Prefecture, Japan, operated by West Japan Railway Company (JR West).

== Lines ==
Higashi-Obama Station is served by the Obama Line, and is located 46.2 kilometers from the terminus of the line at Tsuruga.

== Station layout ==
Higashi-Obama Station has one side platform serving a single bi-directional track. The station is staffed and is located inside the Obama Municipal Sōgō Welfare Center building.

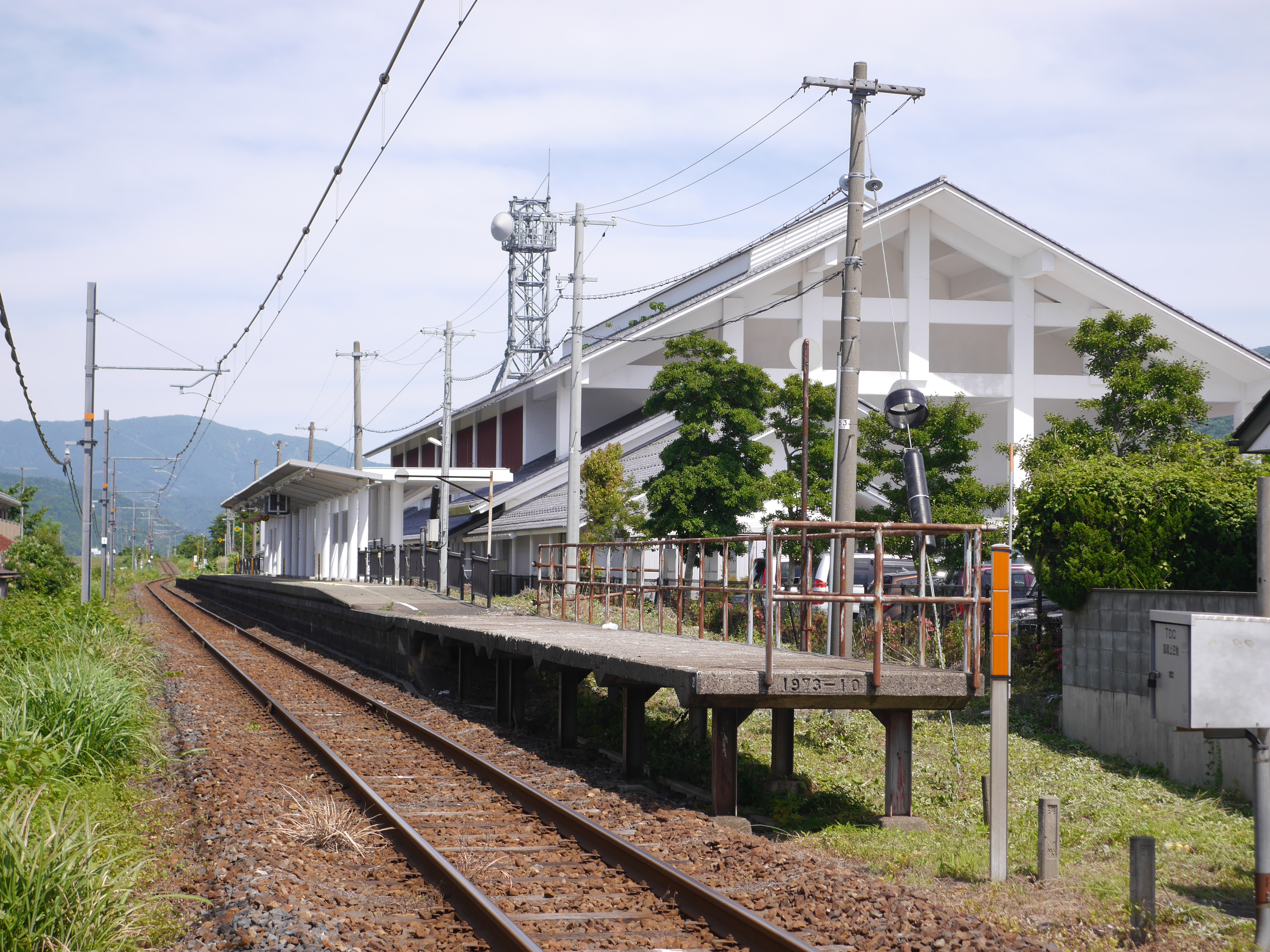
The platform in June 2017

== History ==
Higashi-Obama Station was opened on 14 August 1953. With the privatization of Japanese National Railways (JNR) on 1 April 1987, the station came under the control of JR West.

== Passenger statistics ==
In fiscal 2016, the station was used by an average of 390 passengers daily (boarding passengers only).

== Surrounding area ==
- Fukui Prefecture Wakasa Governmental Office
- Onyū Post Office
- Wakasa Historical Folk Customs & Culture Center
- Wakasa Rikuen
- Fukui Prefecture Wakasa Heliport
- Fukui Prefectural Wakasa East High School
- Employment and Human Resources Development Organization of Japan (Polytech Center Obama)
- National Route 27
- Wakasahiko Shrine

== Others ==
The station is planned to become a stop for the high-speed Hokuriku Shinkansen line around 2046.

== See also ==
- List of railway stations in Japan
