= Temperate forest =

Type of forest

Areas of the globe with a temperate broadleaf and mixed forest biome, according to the WWF

A temperate forest is a forest found between the tropical and boreal regions, located in the temperate zone. It is the second largest terrestrial biome, covering 25% of the world's forest area, only behind the boreal forest, which covers about 33%. These forests cover both hemispheres at latitudes ranging from 25 to 50 degrees, wrapping the planet in a belt similar to that of the boreal forest. Due to its large size spanning several continents, there are several main types: deciduous, coniferous, mixed forest, and rainforest.

== Climate ==
The climate of a temperate forest is highly variable depending on the location of the forest. For example, Los Angeles and Vancouver are both considered to be located in a temperate zone, however, Vancouver is located in a temperate rainforest, while Los Angeles is a relatively dry subtropical climate.

== Types of temperate forest ==
=== Deciduous ===
They are found in Europe, East Asia, North America, and in some parts of South America. Deciduous forests are composed mainly of broadleaf trees, such as maple and oak, that shed all their leaves during one season. They are typically found in three middle-latitude regions with temperate climates characterized by a winter season and year-round precipitation: eastern North America, western Eurasia and northeastern Asia.

=== Coniferous ===
Coniferous forests are composed of needle-leaved evergreen trees, such as pine or fir. Evergreen forests are typically found in regions with moderate climates. Boreal forests, however, are an exception as they are found in subarctic regions. Coniferous trees often have an advantage over broadleaf trees in harsher environments. Their leaves are typically hardier and longer lived but require more energy to grow.

=== Mixed ===
As the name implies, conifers and broadleaf trees grow in the same area. The main trees found in these forests in North America and Eurasia include fir, oak, ash, maple, birch, beech, poplar, elm and pine. Other plant species may include magnolia, prunus, holly, and rhododendron. In South America, conifer and oak species predominate. In Australia, eucalypts are the predominant trees. Hardwood evergreen trees which are widely spaced and are found in the Mediterranean region are olive, cork, oak and stone pine.

=== Temperate rainforest ===
Temperate rainforests are the wettest of all the types, and are found only in very wet coastal areas. Adding to its rarity is that most of the temperate rainforests outside protected areas have been cut down and no longer exist. Temperate rainforests can, however, still be found in some areas, including the Pacific Northwest, southern Chile, northern Turkey (along with some regions of Bulgaria and Georgia), most of Japan, and others.

== Effect of human activity ==
Temperate forests are located in the middle latitudes where much of the planet's population is. Not only were these forests cut down to build cities (i.e. New York City, Seattle, London, Tokyo, Paris), they have also been "cut down long ago to make way for cultivation." This biome has been subject to mining, logging, hunting, pollution, deforestation and habitat loss.
