= Afforestation in Japan =

Projects to plant native tree species in open areas

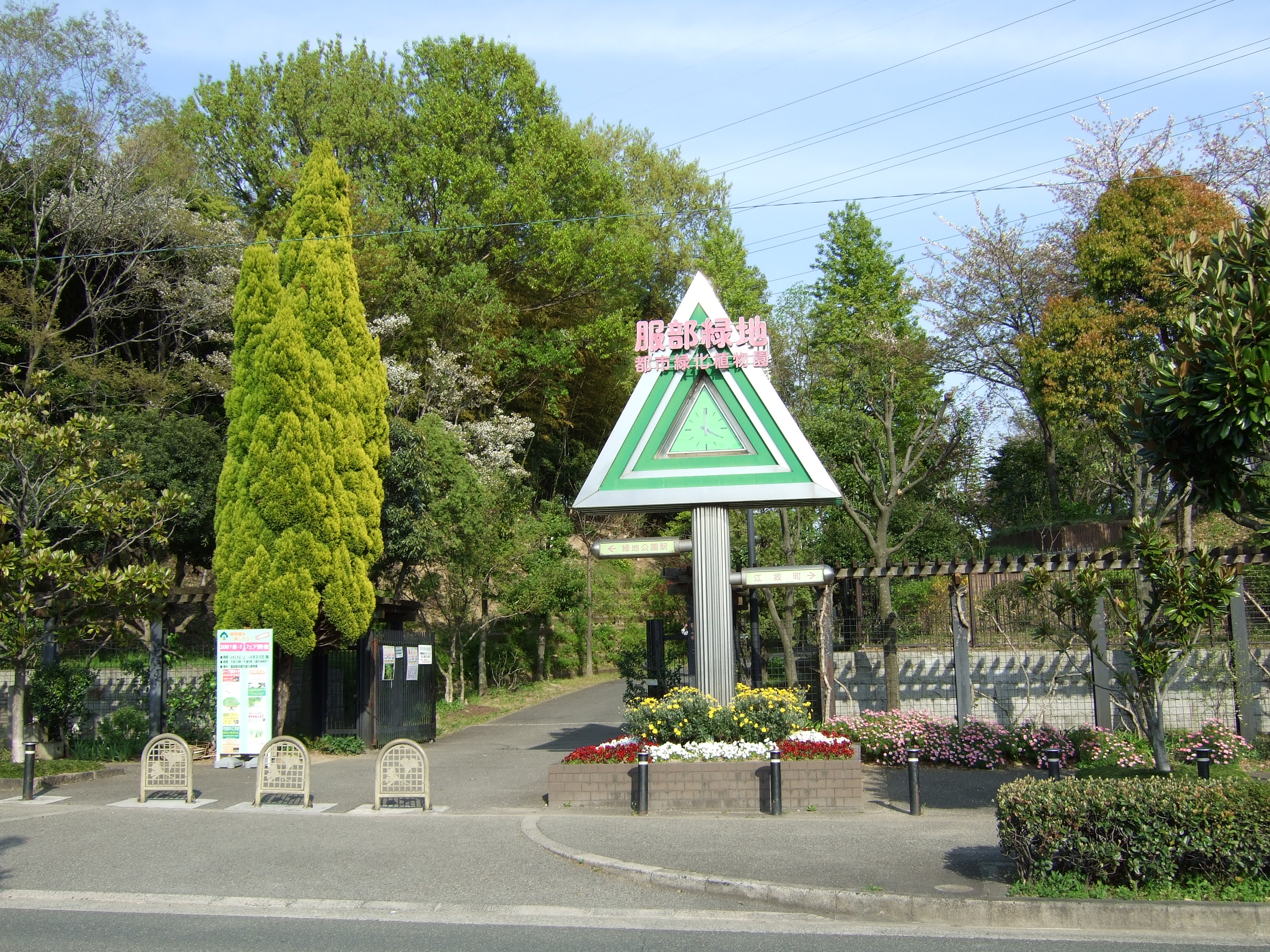
Afforested botanical garden in Hattori Ryokuchi Park, Japan

The Japanese temperate rainforest is well sustained and maintains a high biodiversity. One method that has been utilized in maintaining the health of forests in Japan has been afforestation. The Japanese government and private businesses have set up multiple projects to plant native tree species in open areas scattered throughout the country. This practice has resulted in shifts in forest structure and a healthy temperate rainforest that maintains a high biodiversity.

== Purpose of afforestation ==
The primary goal of afforestation projects in Japan is to develop the forest structure of the nation and to maintain the biodiversity found in the Japanese wilderness. The Japanese temperate rainforest is scattered throughout the Japanese archipelago and is home to many endemic species that are not naturally found anywhere else. As development of the country caused a decline in forest cover, a reduction in biodiversity was seen in those areas. In an effort to counteract the observed decline in biodiversity, Japan began many afforestation projects. New tree stands were planted all over the archipelago and native species that inhabited the existing wild forests began to occupy the newly forested areas.

Afforestation projects in Japan first started after the rebuilding that followed World War II. In efforts to restore the country's infrastructure after the war, large areas of forest were clear-cut for timber and to create pastures to attract immigrant farmers. A new management plan for the forests of Japan was instated after many pastures were abandoned and there was a recognized massive decline of old growth and secondary forests. Forest plantations were created to increase the health of Japanese forests and to sustain the nation's timber industry. Afforestation was combined with changes in logging practices that called for reduced clear-cutting and low impact logging over a larger area.

Many private businesses in the country take part in other afforestation projects as a means of reducing the carbon emissions of the company. Carbon sequestration is a major incentive for businesses to plant seedlings and saplings that will store atmospheric carbon in their biomass as they grow. Companies like Japex and Toyota have planted and maintained tree stands beside their plants located across Japan; planting several thousand native trees in an effort to offset carbon emissions. Businesses also monitor the health of newly planted tree stands by tracking growth and surveying near-by wild forests as a comparison of how well the new stands are doing.

Historically, the forests of Japan were not extensively cut as a means of reducing the frequency of landslides and other natural disasters occurring. The root structure of the forests held the soil in place and stabilized the ground in an environment that experiences heavy rainfall and earthquake activity. In present afforestation projects, trees are used to anchor the soil and reduce the amount of soil erosion undergone by that area. A healthy tree stand also restricts the amount of soil disturbance due to rainfall by intercepting heavy precipitation in the canopy and by slowing the rate of run-off with the litter covering the soil. The role that the Japanese temperate rainforest plays in the prevention of soil erosion was recognized early on in the history of the nation and continues to be a positive reason to reforest open areas as new tree stands reduce the amount of nutrients lost in an area and allow for a more productive ecosystem.

== History ==
The logging industry of Japan can be divided into pre- and post-World War II. Prior to the war, Japan had a small timber industry that impacted a small area, as most of the forests were preserved to prevent erosion and maintain the overall quality of the land. It was during World War II that the logging industry really expanded as timber was increasingly in demand.

The increased demand for timber during the war continued on after it had ended. Japan continued to cut down large forested areas in order to rebuild. Old growth and secondary stands were increasingly fragmented as areas were clear-cut to allow for reconstruction. Between 1945 and 1965, there was rapid deforestation throughout the temperate rainforest of Japan.

During this twenty-year period, open pastures were cultivated in the Hokkaido region of northern Japan in an effort to attract more people to the area for agricultural development. Over forty-five thousand households immigrated to the Hokkaido region, but only 28.6% stayed. Most of the cultivated pasture land was abandoned and returned to the Japanese government from 1966 to 1977, as climate conditions in the area were not conducive to good crop yield. The shift from old growth forest to pasture left large areas of reduced soil fertility that trees were unable to recolonize. Due to a lack of a seed bank and competition with dwarf bamboo, human involvement was necessary to reforest the area. From 1978 to 2005 native trees with high growth rates were planted in plantations. It was mostly conifers that were planted in the area, but it has aided in the recovery of a conifer-broadleaf mixed forest.

In 1973, there was new forestry management implemented in Japan. It restricted clear-cutting and called for selective cutting over a large area. Wild forest was left surrounding areas that had been cut and newly planted. Though the plantation stage converted most of the old growth and secondary forests to conifer plantations, the new management pushed for reduced that shift.

Present day Japan continues to organize several afforestation programs throughout the nation. The government does continue to regulate forestry, but most of the afforestation projects are now put on by various private organizations. Also, most of the timber that Japan uses is imported from foreign markets; this allows for reduced logging in Japan and more time for Japanese forests to grow.

== Processes involved ==
There has been varying degrees of human involvement in afforested regions. For most of the areas that are reforested, there is a clearing of land that is planted with native saplings. Growth is generally monitored, but there is not much human involvement beyond checking the health of a stand.

In other regions, there is more land preparation involved prior to planting anything. Most open areas get quickly colonized by dwarf bamboo that out-competes any saplings trying to grow in the area. To give any new saplings a chance to grow in a new area people practice soil scarification. The land is plowed and soil is rotated. This process kills off any tall grasses of bamboo in the area, effectively reducing competition for new saplings. This process does subject the soil to compaction, making it harder for roots to establish; however, once the trees are established, they can regenerate and facilitate growth of other tree species.

To facilitate further growth and development in plantations, there is selective logging in order to create microhabitats for new growth using pit-and-mound topography. Trees are tipped over to create mounds that turn up more nutrients in the soil and allow for more sunlight in some patches of the understory. A healthy understory of young trees serves as a source of regeneration when an older, larger tree dies.

== Tree species ==
Japan afforestation projects plant only tree species native to Japan. Originally, species were chosen for their rapid growth rates and tolerance for multiple environmental conditions, which led to a large shift from old growth and secondary forests to conifer plantations. Current afforestation projects plant a more diverse number of species.

The dominant tree species planted are Japanese cedar (Cryptomeria japonica) and Japanese cypress (Chamaecyparis obtusa). Both conifer species are native to Japan and prefer to grow in deep, well-drained soils in warm, wet climates. Both species were able to successfully occupy the open areas made available by rapid deforestation. Other than being able to grow quickly, the trees were chosen because of their ornamental use in urban areas and because their wood is highly valuable timber.

Other native tree species are planted in an effort to regenerate mixed forests of conifers and broadleaf deciduous trees. Other species include: Mongolian oak (Quercus mongolica), lobed elm (Ulmus laciniata), Japanese white birch (Betula platyphylla), Glehn's spruce (Picea glehnii), and sakhalin fir (Abies sachalinensis).

== Changes in soil ==
One study examining the soil of various Japanese conifer plantations found that the plantations had a higher concentration of soil organic carbon than wild, natural forests in Japan. Soil carbon is associated with the amount of nutrients that a soil sample can hold. When areas undergo deforestation a lot of the soil organic carbon is exposed and vulnerable to degradation. This results in a loss of nutrients in deforested areas. It would be expected that plantations would have a much smaller amount of organic carbon in the soil because the soil was exposed and experienced a nutrient loss; however, it was found that conifer plantations in Japan actually had more soil carbon than wild forests in the area. It was determined that the heavy litter from newer conifer plantations resulted in an abundance of soil carbon. It was also noted that there was less soil carbon found in plantations that had undergone soil scarification prior to being planted. This was determined to be because soil scarification brought up and exposed more soil organic carbon and more was lost to degradation; however there was still a high concentration of soil carbon in those plantations as well.

== Concerns ==
Afforestation generally seen as a positive thing, and the re-establishment of forests in Japan has been positive overall. Large-scale afforestation is still a new concept, and there are some concerns associated with it. Afforested regions have impacts on local watersheds as well as species interactions.

One study examined the reduced water quality of watersheds downstream of afforested conifer plantations. The concern was that there was no improvement seen with public water despite improved water treatment in those areas. It was found that heavy rainfall upstream in afforested conifer plantations caused an increase in nitrogen and phosphorus running off into the streams. The undeveloped understory in those plantations means that a lot of the soil is exposed. The litter does slow down the rate of the run-off, but a large amount of nutrients still get picked up and put into the watershed. This resulted in an increase in particulate and dissolved nitrogen and phosphorus.

A large concern in Japan is root rot experienced in conifer species as a result of Armillaria, a group of fungus species found in Asia. Sites all over Japan were examined and it was found that every conifer species native to Japan was vulnerable to at least one species of Armillaria. This is a major concern because every conifer species is vulnerable, but it is especially concerning because the majority of the Japanese temperate rainforest is made up of conifer plantations consisting of monocultures of just a few species.

Another concern is due to Japan's practice of importing timber from other places. Although this has proven to be beneficial for Japanese forests, it has resulted in massive deforestation in places that do not have well-developed regulation on logging. Japan is one of the largest importers of timber, which has come at a cost of temperate and tropical forest decline in China and South America. As a result of this negativity, Japan has organized afforestation programs in other countries.

== See also ==
- Deforestation and climate change
