= Biota of Tokyo Imperial Palace =

The biota of Tokyo Imperial Palace grounds, especially of the Fukiage Garden, consists of enriched and distinct flora and fauna found in Tokyo, Japan. An untouched, vast open space in the middle of Tokyo hosts diverse species of wildlife which have been catalogued in field research. For comparison, this article also covers biodiversity in other open spaces in the central districts of Tokyo.

== The location of the Tokyo Imperial Palace and its environs ==
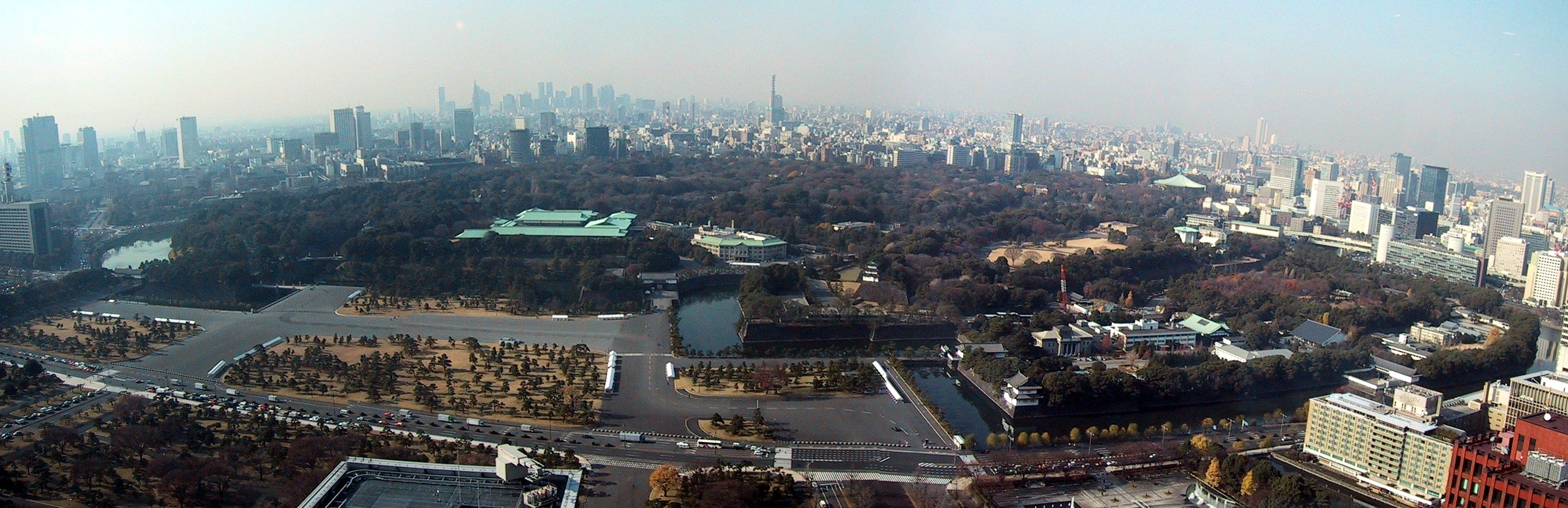
Tokyo Imperial Palace Panorama

The Tokyo Imperial Palace is situated in the center of Chiyoda-ku, Tokyo. It is 115 hectares (280 acres) in size and encircled by moats. The Palace is divided into the eastern part and the western part by the Kan-Moat and Hasuike Moat. The eastern part is called the Imperial Palace Eastern Garden and has been open to the public since 1968. In the western part are: the Fukiage Gyoen (Garden), including the Imperial residence, the Palace, and the Imperial Household Agency. An attempt to maintain or recreate its natural state is evident in the Fukiage Garden. The Palace lies on the tip of Musashino Terrace, between the Arakawa River, plus Iruma River and Tama River. There are moats at the northern and western end of the Palace. The height of the Palace is from 8 to 30 metres (26 to 98 ft), with the lowest point being at the Shimo-Dokan Moat. The eastern end faces the low areas of Tokyo. The Palace is encircled by moats, any of which have been created artificially, since stones had been carried from other places. According to the Meteorological agency neighboring the Palace, the mean temperature is 15 °C (59 °F). The difference in mean temperature of summer and winter is about 30 °C (86 °F). The precipitation is of considerable degree in summer and autumn, while it is minimum in winter.

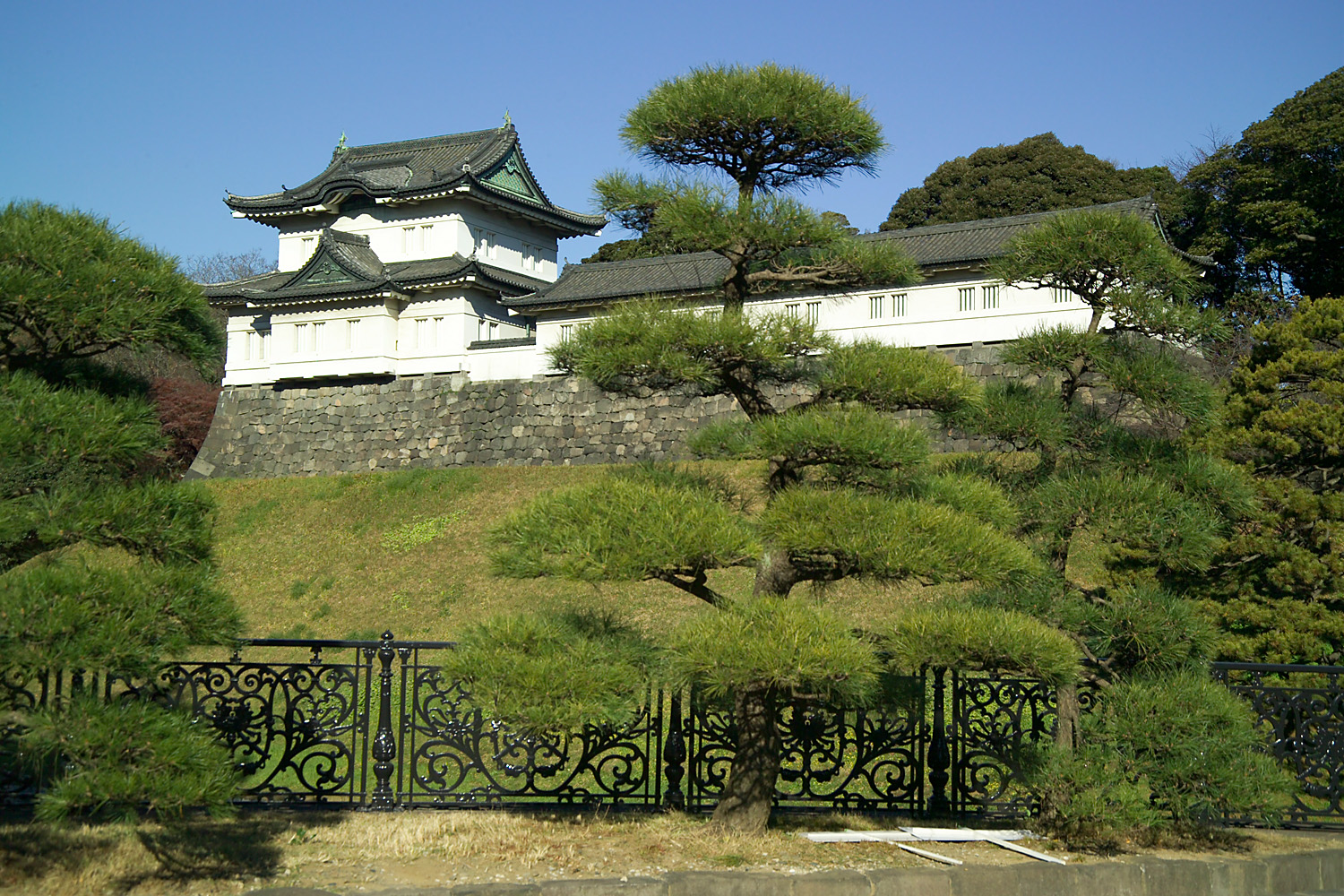
Fushimi Yagura with Japanese black pine trees

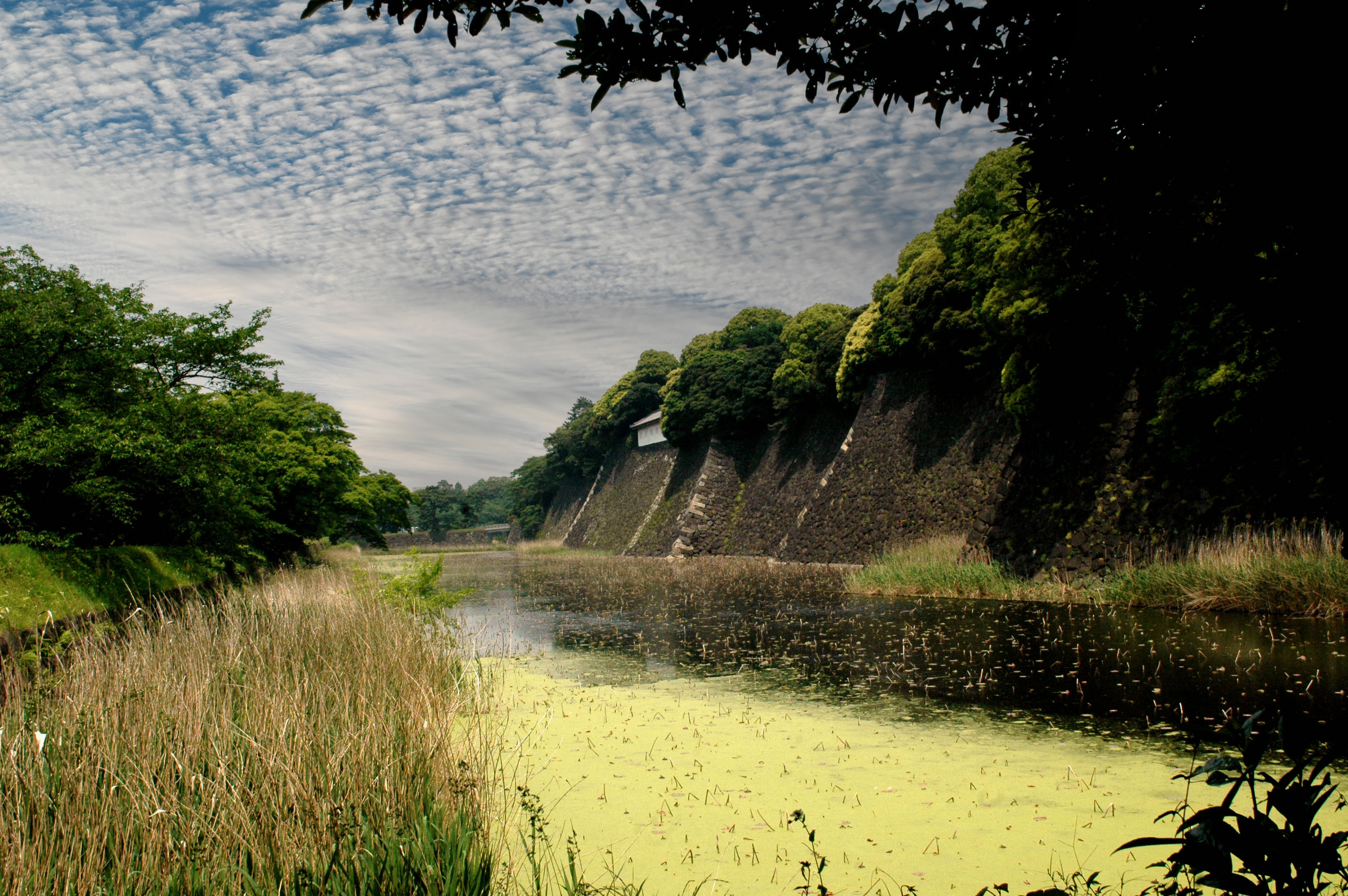
Hasuikebori lotus moat

== History of the Palace ==
=== Before the Edo Era ===
A midden was excavated from 1955 to 1964. Jōmon pottery was found, indicating that the Palace was inhabited in the Jōmon period, before 300 BCE.

Toward the end of the Heian period, Edo Shirō (江戸四郎) built his residence in Edo, but its exact location remains unknown. Ōta Dōkan constructed the Edo Castle from 1456 to 1457. Hōjō Ujitsuna occupied the Edo Castle in 1524. Later the Castle was controlled by Hojo's retainers, the Toyama clan.

In 1590, Tokugawa Ieyasu lived here when Edo became his stronghold. The Palace, at that time, faced the sea of Hibiya on the eastern end. The Nishinomaru area had been the site for temples and recreation. There were 16 temples corresponding to the site of Fukiage garden. In 1603, he became the shōgun and started to enlarge the Edo castle along with many of his successors.

=== Palace in the Edo Era ===
Many castles and moats were constructed; stones were transferred from Izu Peninsula; A large quantity of lime (material) from Ōme, Tokyo, and the whole Edo castle was completed with the completion of the Outer Moat in 1638. The Edo castles were greatly damaged in 1657 by the Great Fire of Meireki. (See Fires in Edo) The reconstruction of Tenshu or castle tower was abandoned because of the stability or peace of the times. Fire barrier zones were set up to prevent fires from spreading. That started with moving the primary residences of the Gosanke, who were three major relatives of Tokugawa shogunate; outside of the Edo Castle and dedicating the vacated space to fire prevention. Relocation of residences belonging to other daimyōs and hatamoto, who were direct retainers of the shōgun, followed. From the end of the 17th century to the beginning of the 18th century, the Fukiage Gyoen remained a large garden. When Tokugawa Ienobu was in office, (1709–1712) he ordered the daimyōs to help construct a large garden with a large pond (1 hectare which has remained), a fall and a river. During the rule of Tokugawa Yoshimune (1716–1745), the Fukiage gardens changed considerably in accord with his philosophy of the promotion of diligence, industrial development and the encouragement of literary and martial arts. He built a study hall, atelier, astronomical observatory, equestrian grounds, archery field, gun field, herb refinery, food factories for sake, sugar, cake and a sheep-raising yard. However, Tokugawa Ienari (office 1787–1837) made the Fukiage Gyoen to the previous gardens. In the later years of the Edo era, not much attention was given to the garden.

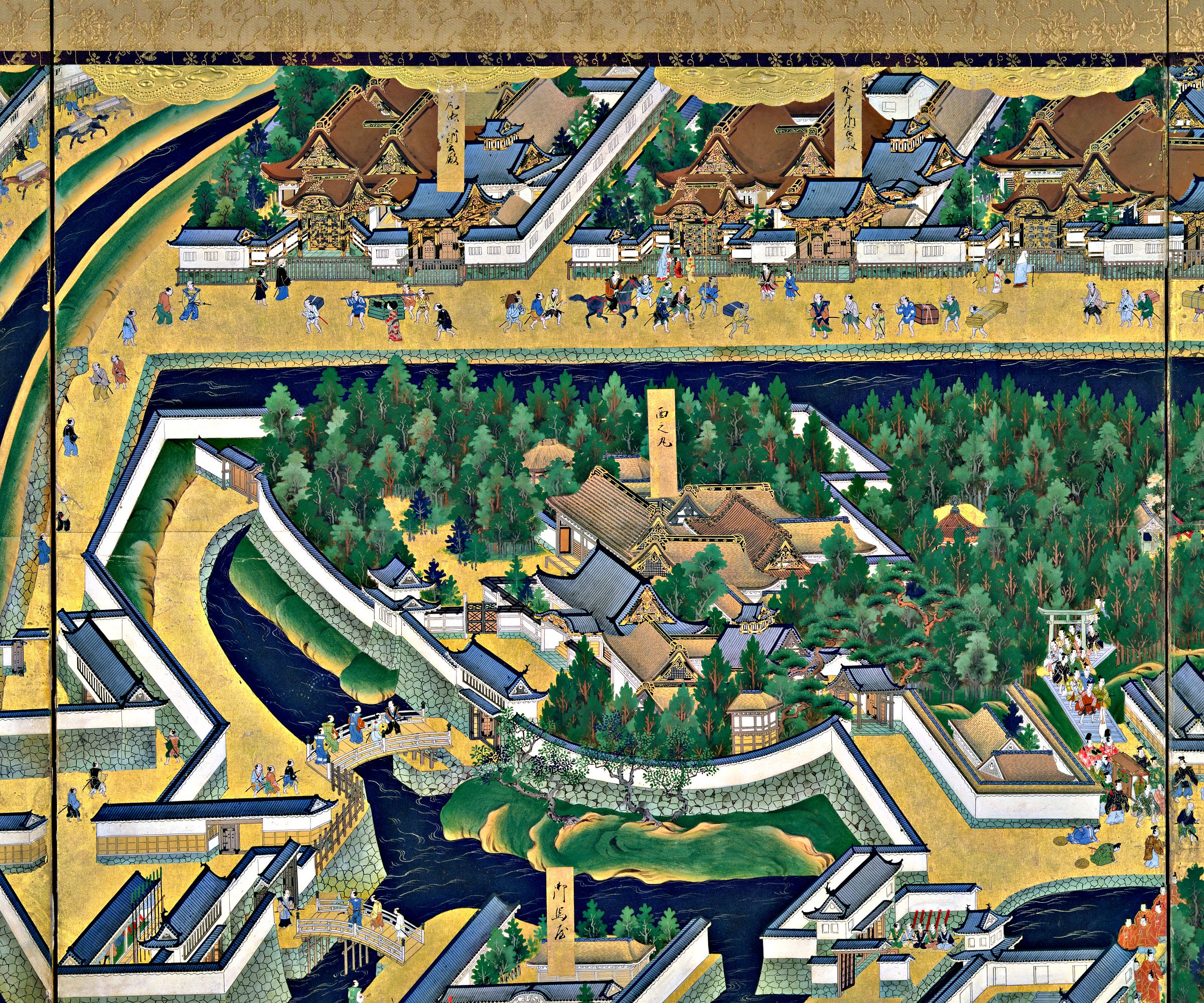
Nishinomaru and Fukiage, residences of the three Tokugawa families, 17th century

=== Palace after the Meiji Restoration ===
After the Meiji Restoration, the Gardens were subject to somewhat random change for a century. The Nishinomaru Palace burned down in 1873. A new Meiji Palace was constructed in 1888. Starting in 1928, the government constructed a short golf course, first of 4 courses and in 1931, of 9 holes (par was 30; almost entire garden was used) for the Emperor Hirohito in the Garden. In 1937, Hirohito discontinued golf and the maintenance of lawn was discontinued. Around 1939 and 1941, the maintenance of the garden was also discontinued. A wartime bombproof residence-shelter was constructed in 1941. While the formal Meiji Palace burned down, the imperial residence was undamaged. The Fukiage residence was completed in 1961 and the formal Palace was completed in 1968. Starting in 1948, some plants were transplanted in accord with the wish of Hirohito who wanted the Garden to become an old-Tokyo type forest. Basically, the maintenance of the Garden was to be kept at a minimum.

== Surveys of the Biota of the Palace ==
Imperial Palace Tokyo Map, Investigation only in the dark green area

In 1921, the plants in the Palace were inventoried and published in Imperial Palace Landscape. This was the first survey of the plants of the Palace. Surveys continued in 1979 (Fukiage Garden), 1980 (Imperial Palace West Block), 1981 (East Gardens), and in 1987-88 (aquatic organisms in moats and ponds). These reports are not available to the public, but provide precise information about the vegetation, its time-course changes, old historic and giant trees. Further surveys started in 1996. The survey of living organisms was reported in 2006.

== Flora ==
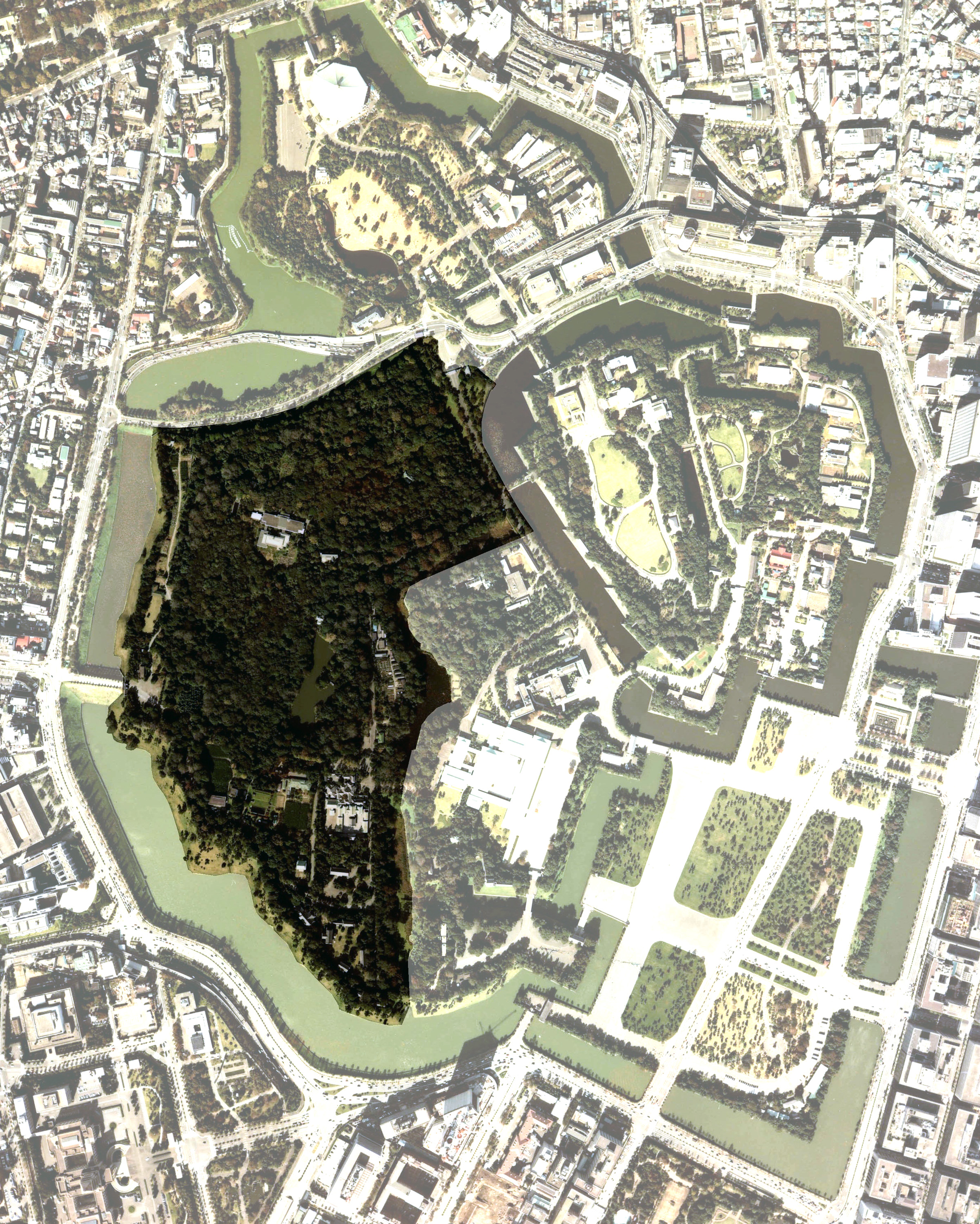
Fukiage Gyoen(Garden), dark area, photographed in 1979

When Tokugawa Ieyasu entered the Edo castle in 1590, there was a beautiful coastline fringed with Japanese black pine trees. The present-day Palace faced the sea at that time. In the early years of the Edo period, there were residences of influential daimyōs. After the latter half of the 17th century, the central parts of the Palace were made beautiful gardens. In the early years of Showa, a golf course of 9 holes was made, which was abolished by the wish of Hirohito in 1937. Hirohito also hoped that the gardens would be left so that nature would be returned; some of the trees were transplanted since 1948.

The biota of the Palace reflects the long history of the Palace. The present Fukiage Garden is mainly composed of woods, although there are small houses, fruit gardens, a rose garden, farms, one for mulberry trees (silkworms). Investigations between 1996 and 1999 revealed woods with broad-leaved evergreen forest trees such as Ilex integra, Castanopsis sieboldii, and Machilus thunbergii on the periphery of the Fukiage Garden, namely over the Dokan Moat, and woods with deciduous broad-leaved trees such as Quercus acutissima in the central part of the Garden. These woods are well cared and minimum cutting is done by the Garden section of the Imperial Household Agency. Although the woods are not the Old-growth forest, the constituents of ever green trees are like those seen in nature. On the contrary, deciduous broad-leaved trees have been planted artificially. The soil is revealed to be good for the development of trees. Well-grown trees and elements of Satoyama such as fruit gardens provide good circumstances for small animals such as insects. Well developed woods of the Palace cool the temperature of Tokyo; the temperature is lower by 2 °C in summer, and are good for the central parts of Tokyo which is influenced by the urban heat island phenomenon.

=== Giant trees and historic trees ===
In the Fukiage Garden there is a line of Zelkova serrata trees. A tree with a circumference of 3.3 metres (11 ft) was revealed to be of genroku era origin (from 1688 to 1703) by the growth ring method in the 1970s. The time might have been earlier since there was a larger tree of 4.77 metres (15.6 ft). In the Yamabukino Nagare of the Fukiage Gardern, Tokugawa Ienari (office 1787 - 1837) ordered the transplantation of famous 40 black pine trees, which were 17 in the Taisho era and 5 in 1986, including those which were re-transplanted. In days gone by, several hundred fir trees were seen, but decreased in number and in 2001, there are only 8 trees inside the Garden. In Tokyo Prefecture, Tashiroran (Epipogium roseum), a kind of Orchidaceae without chlorophyll was discovered in the Palace. Between the publication of 1986 and the surveys of 1996-1999, 55 species had disappeared, possibly because of the deepening of the woods and insufficient sunlight.

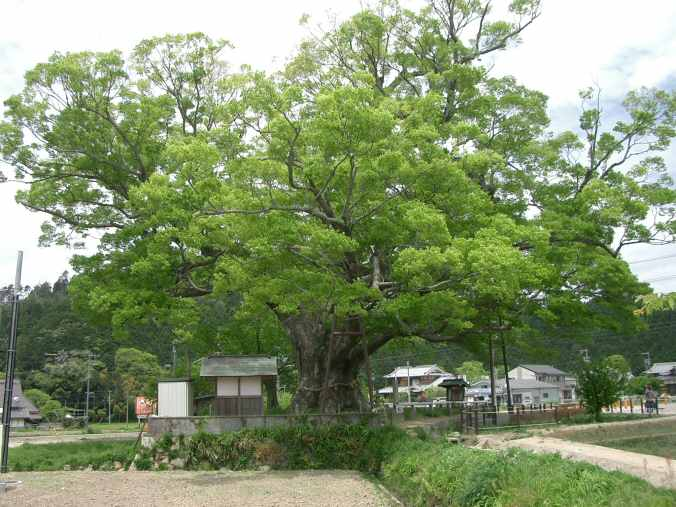
Zelkova serrata, Keyaki (Japanese)

=== Bryophytes and lichens ===
There are 77 species of mosses, 29 species of liverworts (hepatics) and one species of hornwort in the Palace. The Palace is the most rich place, followed by Institute for Nature Study with 52 species. Endangered species such as Taxiphyllum alternans (Card.) Z. Iwats and Monosolenium tenerum were found in the Palace, while common species associated with urbanization such as Funaria hygrometrica and Marchantia polymorpha were not found in the Palace.

57 species of lichens were found in the Palace. Of them 3 genera and 5 species were first found in the Palace. Parmotrema tinctorum and Usnea rubescens Stirt which are weak in atmospheric pollution were not found in the Palace.

=== Algae ===
Interesting algae has been found, including 11 species of cyanobacteria, 156 species of diatoms (including varieties), 58 species of green algae and other species of algae.

=== Fungi ===
There have been 368 species of fungi found, including 8 new species. Previously Hirohito had inventoried and left in place 64 species of Mycetozoa. New investigations between 1996 and 1999 revealed 88 species of Mycetozoa. 19 species previously recorded were not found in the new investigations.

Naturalist Minakata Kumagusu gave a short seminar to the emperor. He took Hirohito for a walk in the woods on the island, then gave him a 25-minute lecture, on board the royal ship Nagato, on slime molds on June 1, 1929. Minakata presented the Emperor with gifts including 110 specimens of slime molds kept in empty taffy boxes.

=== Detailed explanations of the vegetation of the Palace ===
Detailed explanations of the vegetation of the Palace with species are made in the reference in English. They include 1. Trees, Giant Trees and Historic Trees, Bonsai in the Imperial Palace, 2. Herbaceous Plants and Shrubs, Fukiage Gardens, Plants around the Moats, Other locations, Naturalized Plants in Japan 3. Four seasons at the Imperial Palace.

=== Three noted trees ===
There are three noted species of trees of the Palace. One is a fir tree (Abies) in the Three Palace Sanctuaries. In the Meiji era, other trees of the same species were more than several hundreds in number, but only 8 trees survived in 2001. This one grew to a large size.

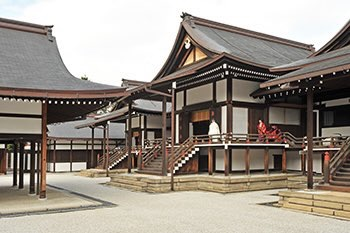
Three Palace Sanctuaries

The second is Liquidambar formosana Hance (English name: sweet gum) (Japanese name: fū), which was transplanted from China in 1727 by Tokugawa Yoshimune. Originally L. formosana was planted where Chinese emperors lived. There were 13 tall trees in the Fukiage Garden; the tallest was about 20 metres (66 ft) high, and 5.1 metres (17 ft) in circumference, but whether they were introduced in 1727 was not verified. The crowns of this tree turn reddish-orange or crimson red in fall.

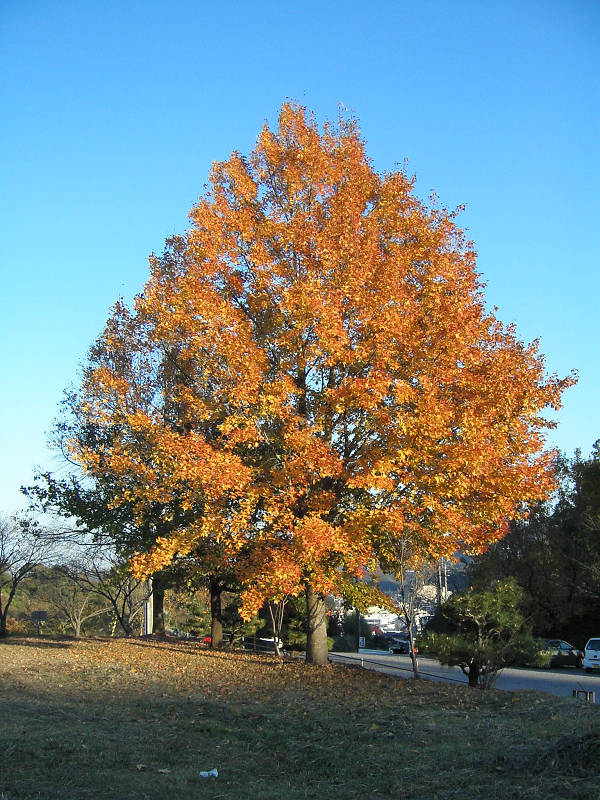
Liquidambar formosana

The third is Metasequoia glyptostroboides, the dawn redwood. A young plant and 500 seeds were presented to Japan by an American scholar in 1949. The young plant and one from a seed were planted in the south of Kaentei House of the Fukiage Garden. Both were 27 metres (89 ft) high and one was 2.7 metres (8 ft 10 in) and the other 4.1 metres (13 ft) in breast-height circumference in 2001.

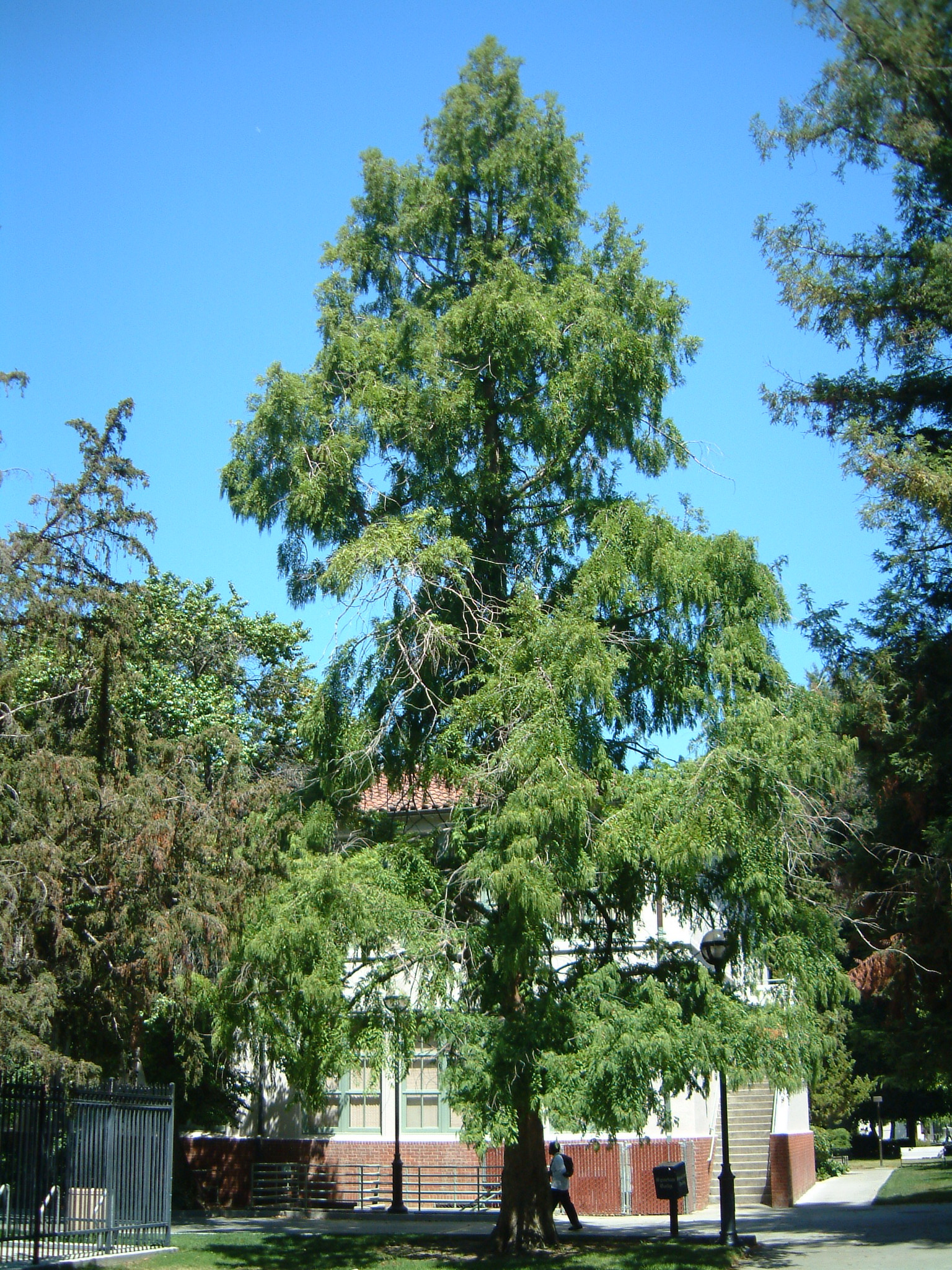
Metasequoia glyptostroboides

=== Monitoring vegetation with satellites ===
The vegetation of the Palace was monitored with Ikonos satellite (March 10, 2000) and LandStat satellite (July 25, 1999). Evergreen, broad-leafed species such as Cinnamomum camphora, Machilus thunbergii, and Lithocarpus edulis were differentiated from temperate deciduous trees, such as cherry blossoms, Quercus acutissima, Zelkova serrata and Acer palmatum. Temperature changes were monitored with the LandStat satellite. It was suggested that the Palace interfered with the urban heat island phenomenon.

=== Hirohito and nature ===
Naoru Tanaka, a chamberlain of Japan for Hirohito remembered an episode which took place in September 1965, on the day Hirohito returned from a 2-month stay from his summer resort. On the previous day, Tanaka had ordered the cleaning of the very thick weed and bush of garden of Hirohito. Hirohito scolded him asking why he ordered the cleaning. He replied that the weed was so thick. Hirohito said that there was no such word as weed. Every plant had its name. Since then, every question of Hirohito concerning plants came to him, although his speciality was geography. Hirohito loved nature, but thought of birds coming to the Palace and he ordered plants for wild birds be planted, such as Pyracantha, Idesia, Ardisia japonica, Ilex rotunda, Ilex serrata and Viburnum plicatum var. tomentosum. According to Tanaka, Hirohito's idea of leaving old-Tokyo woods in the Palace was based on his experience of the 1923 Great Kantō earthquake; it should be a place for evacuation.

== Fauna ==
=== Mammals ===
Small Japanese mole (Mogera imaizumii) is considered to have lived from the Edo era, while the origin of raccoon dog and masked palm civet which were found in the Palace remains unknown. But the latter two animals are found inside Tokyo Prefecture such as Imperial Akasaka residences and in Machida city, and probably they are not of pet origin. Japanese house bat and small Japanese moles are considered of natural origin in the Palace. The number of Japanese house bat is small, because the woods are so dark at night that insects are enough for their food. DNA studies revealed that small Japanese moles in the Palace and those of neighboring Tokyo area of Hino city are the same in species, although they have become extinct inside central Tokyo except the Palace.

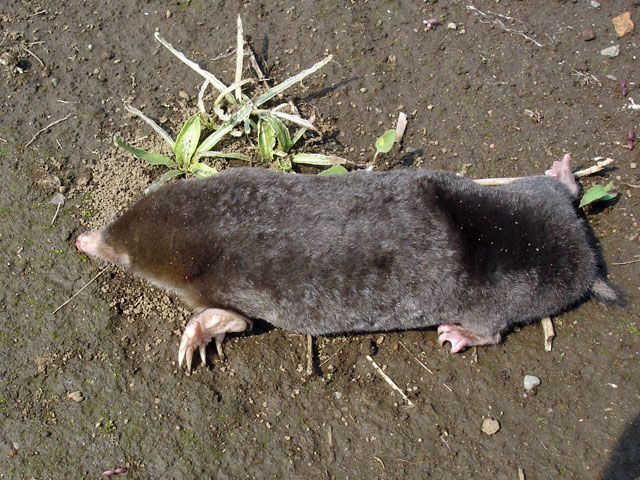
The small Japanese mole has inhabited the Palace grounds since the early years of the Edo era

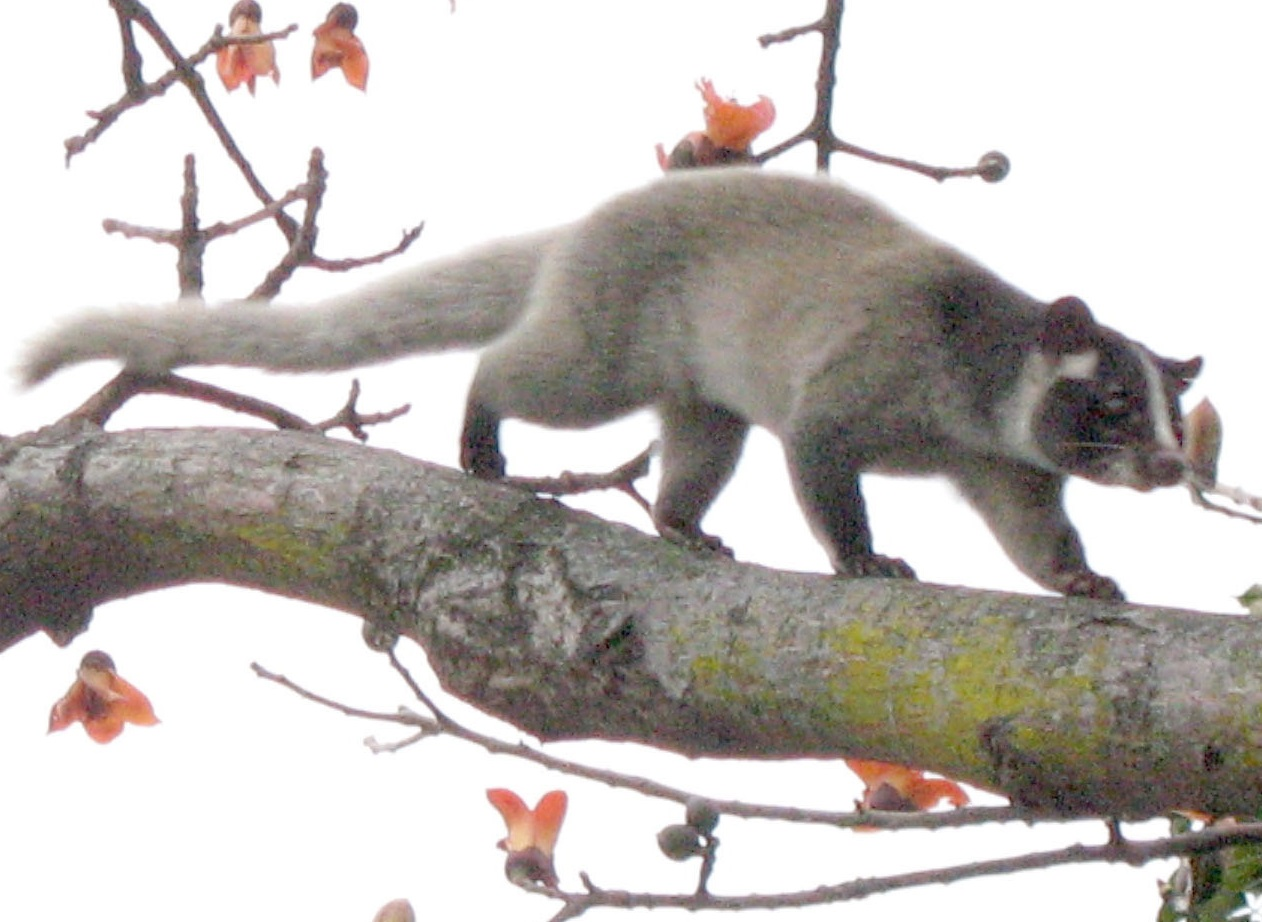
Masked palm civet on tree

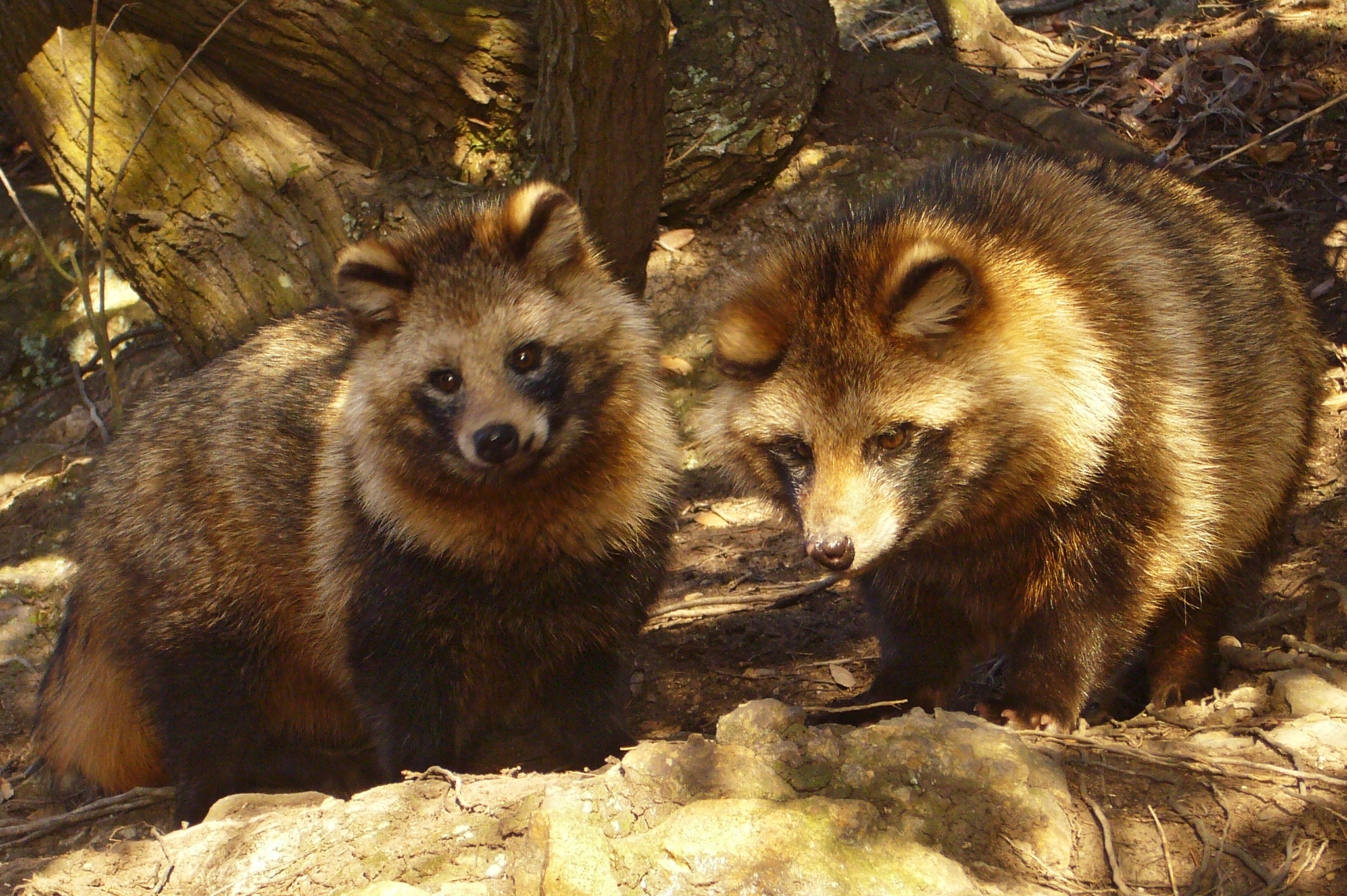
Wild raccoon dogs at Fukuyama, Hiroshima

=== Amphibians and reptiles ===
In the Palace, bullfrogs have greatly increased in number, with adverse effects on reptiles, amphibians and insects. The affected reptiles include the Chinese pond turtle, Trachemys scripta elegans, Chinese softshell turtle, Takydromus tachydromoides, Japanese rat snake, Japanese striped snake, Hebius vibakari, and various geckos and lizards. The distribution of amphibians is very interesting. Salamander was not found in the Palace. Bufo japonicus formosus Japanese tree frog, bullfrog were found but, Japanese brown frog, Daruma pond frog, Japanese wrinkled frog could not be found. The smaller number of frogs and the disappearance of the three frogs were considered to be due to the extraordinary increase of bullfrogs. Once a species disappears such as by bullfrogs, it is extremely difficult to return to the previous condition because of the closed nature of the Palace.

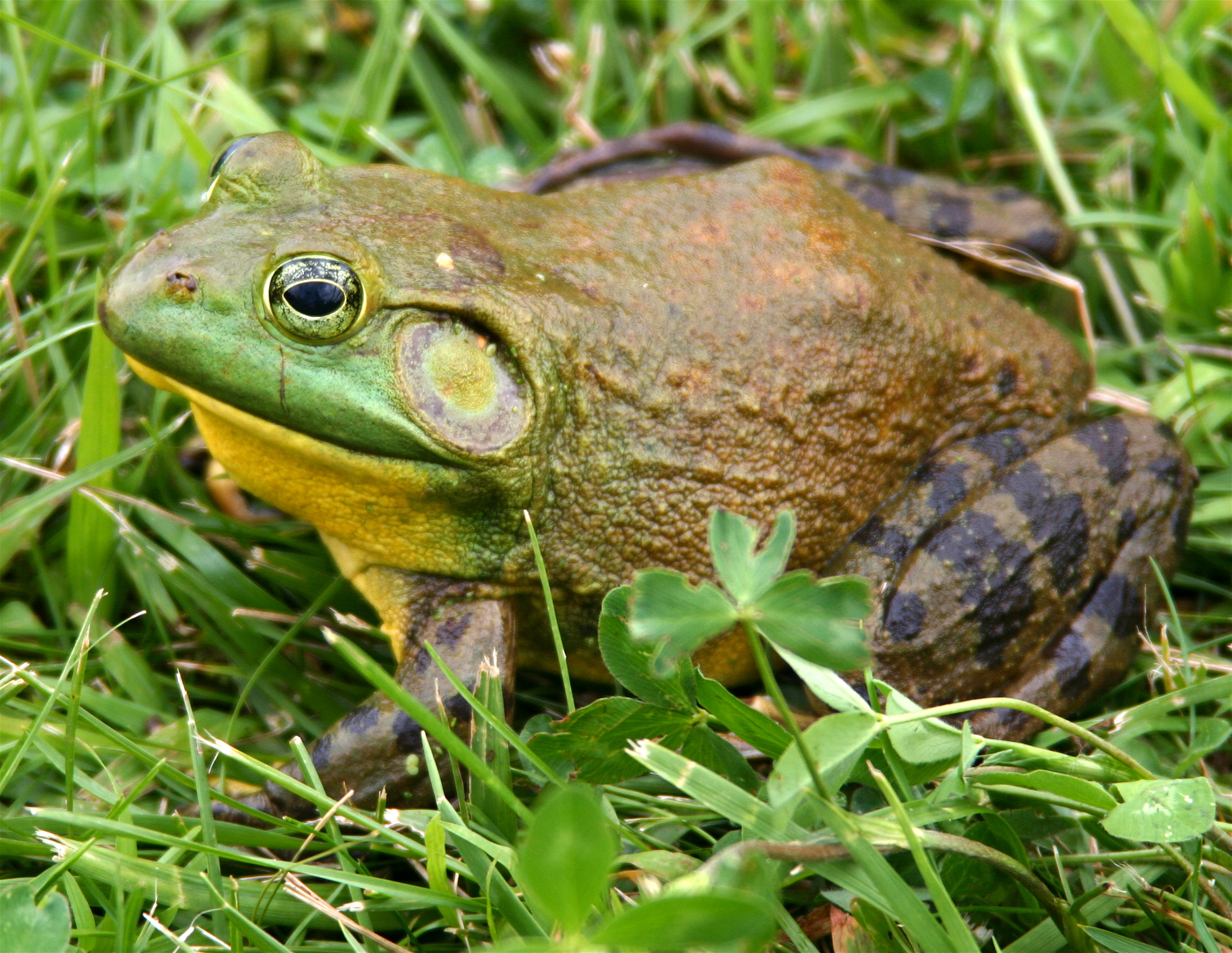
The bullfrog has had harmful effects on other animals in the Palace

=== Birds ===
The northern goshawk, a raptor, which used to winter on Palace grounds, gradually stayed for all seasons. Nosuri (Buteo japonicus) also stayed in the Palace. As a result, ducks and Oriental turtle doves decreased. The goshawk preyed mainly on jungle crows. In the 1950s, heron was hunted away because they damaged the trees in the Palace. Around 1975, the common kingfisher, the Japanese pygmy woodpecker, the Hakusekirei (Motacilla alba lugens) which is a kind of white wagtail, and the brown-eared bulbul have become sedentary birds on the Palace grounds. It is not unusual for birds to become urbanized, especially the common kingfisher. The route of common kingfisher to the Palace is being investigated, and was thought to be through green open spaces in neighboring Tokyo areas. In the 1950s, the colonies of herons and great cormorant disappeared in the Palace, as a result of deteriorating living conditions.

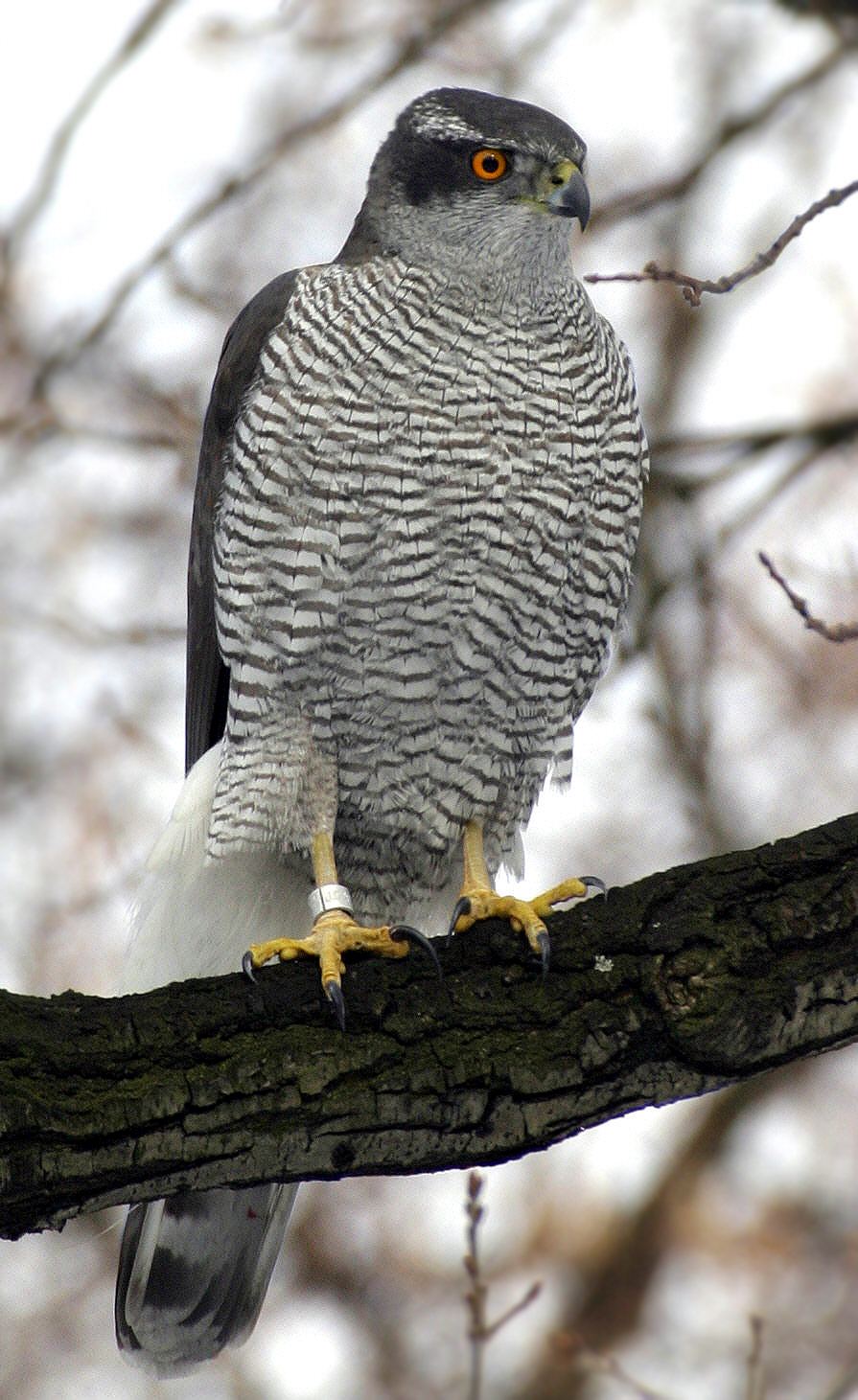
The northern goshawk, a raptor, took up residence on the palace grounds, preying on the avian community

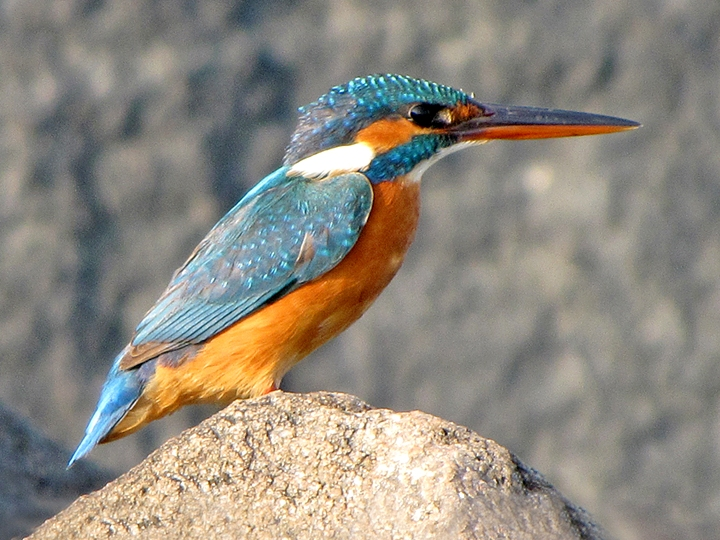
Common kingfisher

==== Wild birds observed by a photographer ====
The following list shows wild birds observed by Takuya Kanouchi between April 1994 and March 1995 in the Palace gardens including the eastern garden. He is a freelance wild bird photographer. Little grebe, great cormorant, black-crowned night heron, little egret, grey heron, Mandarin duck, mallard, Eastern spot-billed duck, Eurasian wigeon, northern pintail, tufted duck, black kite, northern goshawk, Eurasian sparrowhawk, nosuri (Japanese) Buteo japonicus, common moorhen, black-headed gull, European herring gull, Oriental turtle dove, lesser cuckoo, brown boobook, common kingfisher, Japanese green woodpecker, Japanese pygmy woodpecker, barn swallow, common house martin, grey wagtail, Motacilla alba lugens, brown-eared bulbul, bull-headed shrike, Daurian redstart, pale thrush, Naumann's thrush, Japanese bush warbler, goldcrest, coal tit, varied tit, Japanese tit, warbling white-eye, meadow bunting, black-faced bunting, hawfinch, Eurasian tree sparrow, white-cheeked starling, azure-winged magpie, carrion crow and jungle crow.

=== Fish ===
Ten species of fish commonly seen in Japan were found in the Dōkan Moat including common carp, Carassius cuvieri, Carassius auratus langsdorfii, Misgurnus anguillicaudatus and stone moroko. In the Hasuike Moat, northern snakehead was confirmed in addition. DNA studies of the obtained Carassius auratus langsdorfii revealed that all fish were triploidy females or tetraploidy females. They reproduce in a clone-like fashion, by ameiotic parthenogenesis. The same phenomenon was also seen in the same species of fish in the moat of Hiroshima castle, Hiroshima Prefecture. The researcher analyzed it by the cytoflow method.

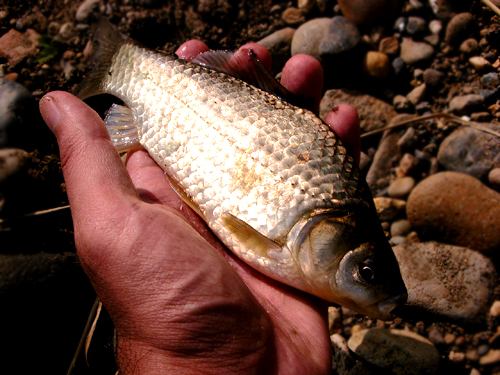
Carassius auratus langsdorfii, ginbuna (Japanese)

=== Crustaceans ===
In the moats, Palaemon adspersus, Macrobrachium, nukaebi (Paratya improvisa) and Procambarus clarkii were found, in many numbers except Macrobrachium. Procambarus clarkii was not obtained in the Dokan Moat. In the eastern Garden, a crab, sawagani or (Geothelphusa dehaani) was confirmed. In the moats, parasitic crustaceans were found in stone moroko, Carassius auratus langsdorfii, Carassius cuvieri and in some shrimps. As land living crustaceans, 16 species of Isopoda and two species of Gammaridea were found. The most common Isopoda was Tokyo koshibiro dangomushi which is usually found in deep woods. Three species of Harpacticoida were found from the soil, indicating a stable circumstance of the Palace like woods in the mountains.

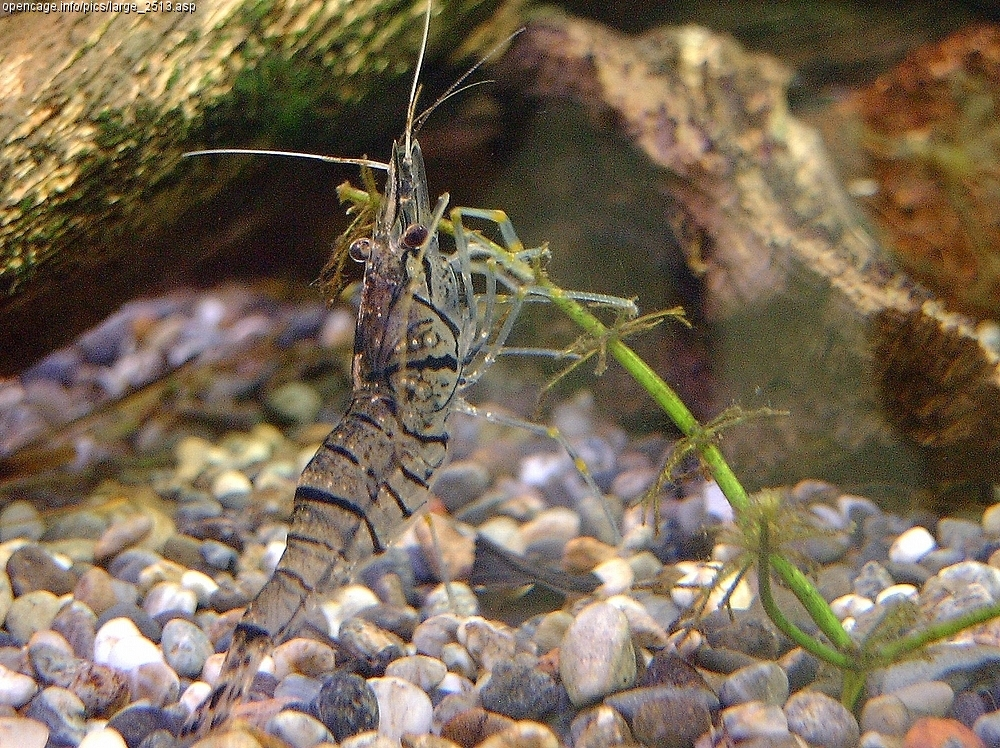
Palaemon adspersus in great numbers in the moat of the Palace

=== Myriapodae ===
In the Fukiage Garden, 41 species of Myriapodae were found; of them, seven had not been previously documented. In Chiba Prefecture, 73 species were found, and in the Palace, about half of those found in Chiba Prefecture have been found, indicating the richness of nature in the Palace. Characteristic in the Myriapodae in the Palace was that the species were those found in the subtropical zone. This may suggest that before the construction of Edo castle, the Palace was in the laurel forest zone.

=== Pseudoscorpions ===
Four species of pseudoscorpion were found in the Palace, indicating the smallness of pseudoscorpion in the Palace, compared with the northern Kanto Prefectures. During the long history of the Palace, there might have been periods when the Palace was not good for the ecology of pseudoscorpions.

=== Spiders ===
Thirty families of spiders which included 141 species of spiders were inventoried between 1996 and 1999, smaller than counted elsewhere in the Prefecture. This may be explained by the change of circumstances not conducive for spiders. Many species of spiders were common in the Palace as well as outside the palace gardens; suggesting that spiders might spread by the wind.

=== Oribatidae, Tardigrades, Earthworms ===
Thirty-nine families and 68 species of Oribatida were confirmed in the Palace, indicating a natural circumstance in comparison with the investigations in Meiji Shrine, Todoroki Valley, Residence of Prince Hitachi, Musashi-Murayama city and Kokubunji city. Four families, nine genera and 21 species of Tardigrade were found in the Palace. Three families, four genera and 20 species of earthworms were found in the Palace. Of them, four had not been documented. Compared with the investigations in 11 spots in Tokyo, the Palace had the most good soil for the earthworms.

Thirteen species of fresh water shellfishes and 40 species of land snail were confirmed in the Palace. Freshwater shellfishes previously commonly seen in Japan became rare, but they were seen in the Palace, including Sphaerium japonicum, a kind Viviparidae and Radix auricularia. As an example of artificial intervention, kawanina, or Semisulcospira libertina, was introduced for the growth of fireflies.

Land living shellfishes are divided into the native group which favored deranged environments living the subtropical zone and a group introduced by foreign countries. Some species might have lived in the Edo era, while some others might have been introduced from foreign countries. Animal plankton was studies in the Dokan Moat, Hasuike Moat and Hyo Pond, an artificial pond from 1996 to 1999.

=== Insects ===
==== Odonatae ====
In the investigation of 1987 and 1988, eight families and 27 species of Odonatae were found, and the following monitoring six species were found, in all eight families and 33 species. In one ku of Tokyo mainland Prefecture, 20-30 species of Odonata were usually found. Some of those which disappeared in central Tokyo were found, such as biniitotonbo (Ceriagrion nipponicum), kosanae and aoyanma (Aeschnophlebia longistigma). Chotonbo (Rhyothemis fuliginosa) has become a resident, while Rubia has considerably decreased. The Palace revealed to be a precious place for Odonata, although water areas are not so large.

==== Grasshoppers ====
Forty-five species of grasshoppers were found in the Palace, indicating the richness of nature in the Palace, compared with other central parts of Tokyo.

==== Aphids ====
Two families, 95 species of aphids were found in the palace. In the monitoring of aphids between 2001 and 2005, 20 more species were confirmed; totaling 115 species. The Palace was shown to be like Satoyama in the environment, which is good for aphids.

==== Scale insects ====
Nine families and 127 species, including those not documented before, were found in the Palace. Some of the species indicate the effects of urban heat island phenomenon.

==== Pentatomoidea ====
Forty-one families and 214 species of pentatomoidea were confirmed. Some of them might have been introduced with the plants transplanted into the Palace, since earlier investigations in the ku areas of Tokyo Prefecture revealed less than 200 species. On the contrary, water-born Hemiptera do not have an ability to move so much and may reflect the previous condition. They are seldom senn in central Tokyo except the Palace.

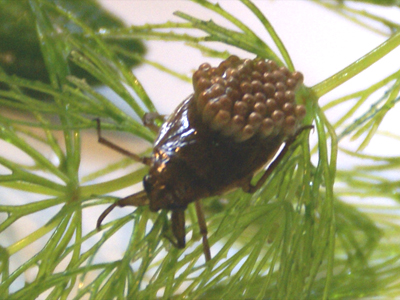
Kooimushi or Diplonychu japonicus belonging to Pentatomoidea in the Palace, which is not seen in other parts of Tokyo

==== Thrips ====
Three families and 74 species were found in the Palace, including 10 plus several species not documented in Japan before.

==== Moths ====
Forty-two families and 514 species of moths were confirmed in the investigations of 1996 to 1999. One of the moths had become extinct, but it was seen again and it was because the lichen it eats was weak in atmospheric pollutions such as photochemical smog in the 1970s.

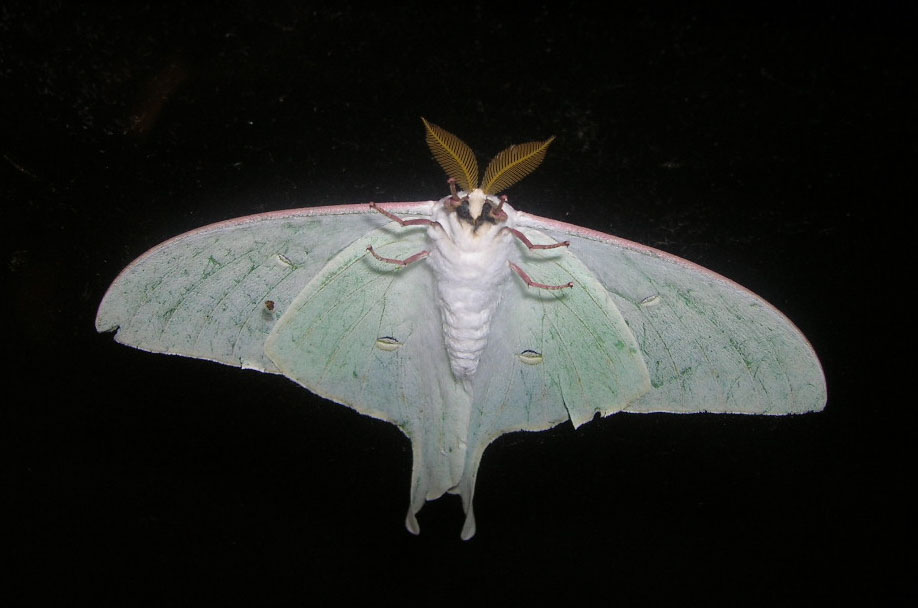
Oomizuao Actias artemis rare in central Tokyo, was seen in the Palace

==== Butterflies ====
Eight families and 37 species of butterflies were confirmed in the investigations of 1996 to 1999. In the monitoring of 2001 to 2005, 11 more species were found, to a total of 48 species, indicating that the Palace is a precious area for the butterflies. Butterflies fly from one place to another, so that, various open green spaces in Tokyo are important in the ecology of butterflies. Administrative works should be to a minimum, since butterflies are small in number in the Meiji Shrine which is well cared and administered.

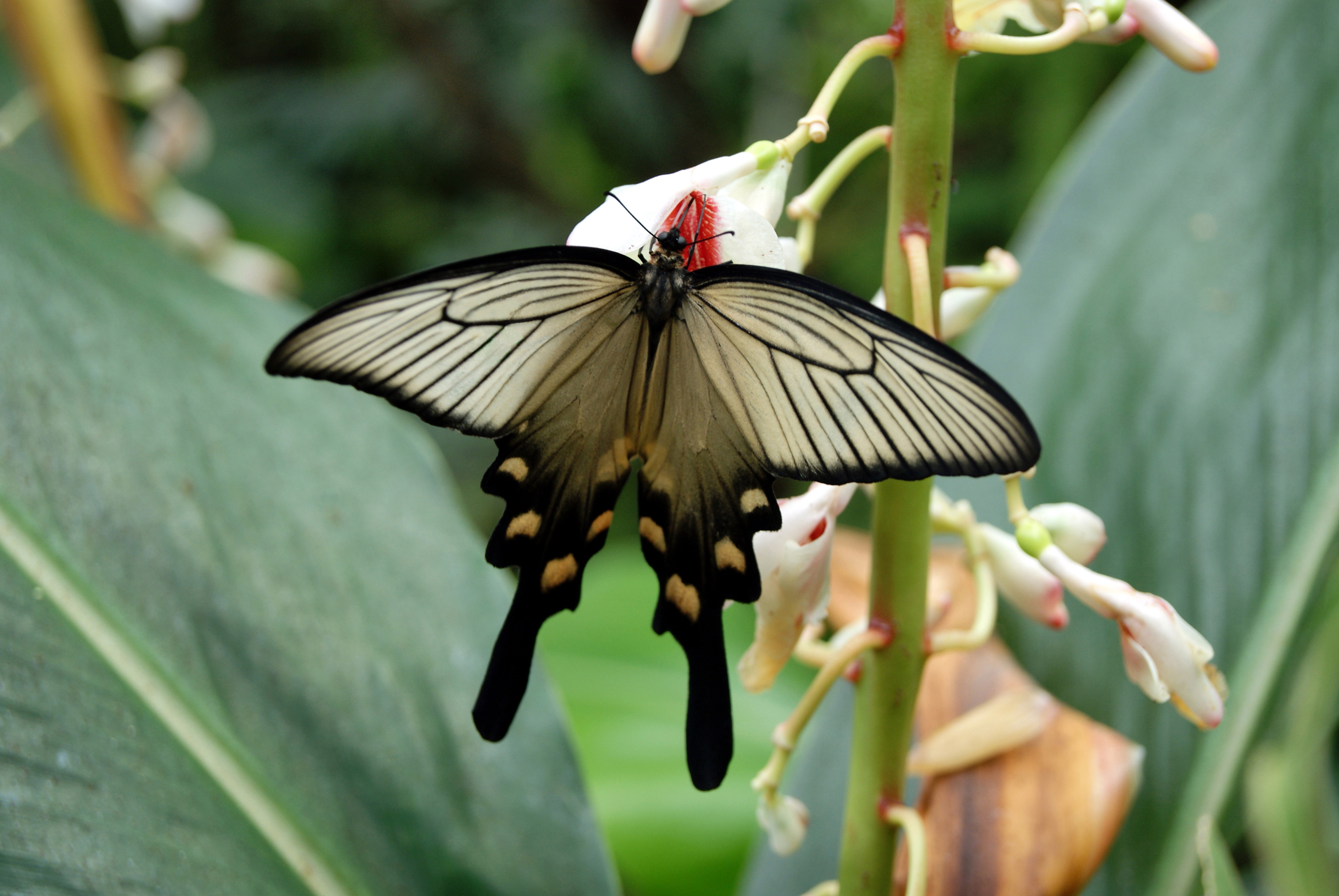
Jakou-ageha Atrophaneura alcinous rare in central Tokyo, was seen in the Palace

==== Beetles ====
According to the survey between 1996 and 1998, three families and 738 species of Beetles were confirmed in the Palace including Prosopocoilus inclinatus, which is rarely seen in central Tokyo. Oomidzusumashi or a kind of whirligig beetle which has become extinct in central Tokyo was also confirmed. Beetles in the Palace suggests close relationships with those in the Izu Peninsula and Miura Peninsula. The presence of chairochibigengoro, or a kind of Dytiscidae, which is seen near the sea, may suggest that the Palace was once near the seashore. 2 families and 39 species of longhorn beetle were confirmed in the Palace. Five families and 161 species of rove beetles were confirmed between 1996 and 1997 and the following monitoring.

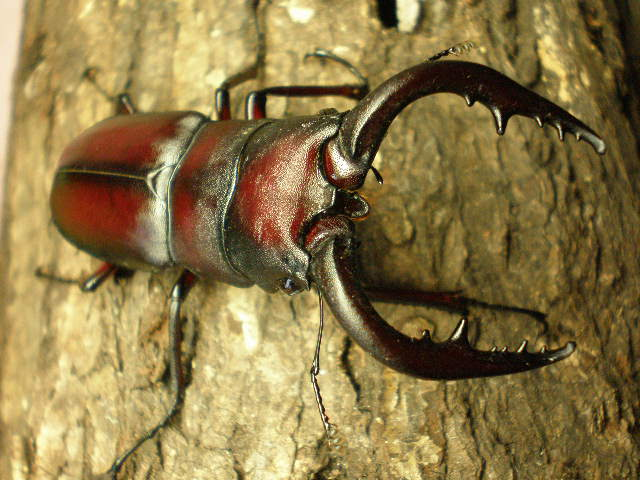
Nokogiri kuwagara, rare in central Tokyo, was seen in the Palace

==== Wasps ====
Forty-eight families and 513 species of bees were confirmed in the investigations of 1996 to 1999.

==== Ants ====
Forty-nine species of ants were confirmed in the Palace; which is a larger number than that in Ota-ku, Nakano-ku, and Itabashi-ku, Tokyo. Ants in the Palace were characterized by their not being the species spreading their spheres artificially.

==== Vespinae ====
18 families and 128 species of vespinae were confirmed, including Vespinae and honeybees. Most honeybees are Apis cerana japonica Rad, which is common in Japan. The reason why western honey bees are smaller in number might be that Apis cerane japonica has resistance to larger Vespinae.

==== Flies and mosquitoes ====
525 species of flies and mosquitoes, including kogata-akaieka (Culex tritaeniorhynchus) which transmits Japanese encephalitis, were confirmed in 1996 and 1997. There were 74 species of Chironomidae, this number corresponded to the whole number seen in the area of Tama River. The species of flies were the same as those of Tama Area of Tokyo and those multiply in the garbage were few in number. Among the flies, there were 77 species of Drosophilidae in the Palace. The ecology studies with Drosophilidae in the Palace and the experimental plantation in Chiba revealed that both places have woods, and grassland and marshland in common, serving to the diversity of animals. Although the Palace is a secluded circumstance, its connections with outer circumstances are apparent and important.

==== Protura ====
Three families and 16 species of Protura were confirmed, indicating the richness of nature of the palace.

==== Springtails ====
Twelve families and 74 species of springtail were confirmed in the Palace indicating the favorable circumstances of the Palace.

== Characteristics of the Biota of Tokyo Imperial Palace ==
Based on the distribution of Myriapoda and spiders, the Tokyo Imperial Palace area had been a laurel forest facing the sea, before the entry of Tokugawa Ieyasu into the Edo castle. Since then, it had been changed in a number of ways such as the castle, residences of daimyōs, gardens and a golf course. In 1937, the administration as a park had been discontinued and in 1948, at the request of Hirohito that nature of old Musashino or old Tokyo should be revived, some of the plants of Musashino or old Tokyo were transplanted. Although it is not a virgin forest, the Tokyo Imperial Palace is exceptionally rich in nature, considering its location in the heart of a great city. Therefore, the biota of the Palace is rich in vegetation as well as in animals of the Animal Kingdom. While small Japanese mole has outlived a long history since the Edo era, this is an exceptional case, and it is considered that many living creatures and plants have disappeared. Especially due to urbanization and pollution, such as photochemical smog in the 1970s, big trees such as fir and Cryptomeria have withered. Large sized lichens have completely disappeared. As a constituent of the biota of the Palace, the bringing of animals or plants from outside, either intentionally or unintentionally, is important. In the present investigations, many new species have been observed. Although the Palace is a closed circumstance, the effects from other places should be watched for any changes. As constituents of animals and vegetation, Cryptoparlatorea edentata (Takagi et Kawai, 1966) might have been introduced in the Edo era with transplanted fir, indicating the effects of trees at large. Some of land shellfishes might also have been introduced. Some species which had not been documented were found in algae, Oribatida and earthworms. The Palace is encircled by Central Tokyo, and bordered by moats. Some of the living creatures without an ability to move may disappear, while the introduction of bullfrogs produced immense effects on other animals. There is closedness of the Palace but at the same time, there are also strong connections with the outer world. The northern goshawk has become a sedentary bird, producing great changes in the ecology of other birds. The biota has shown constant changes, and it should be maintained, with the least artificial modulations of the circumstances.
