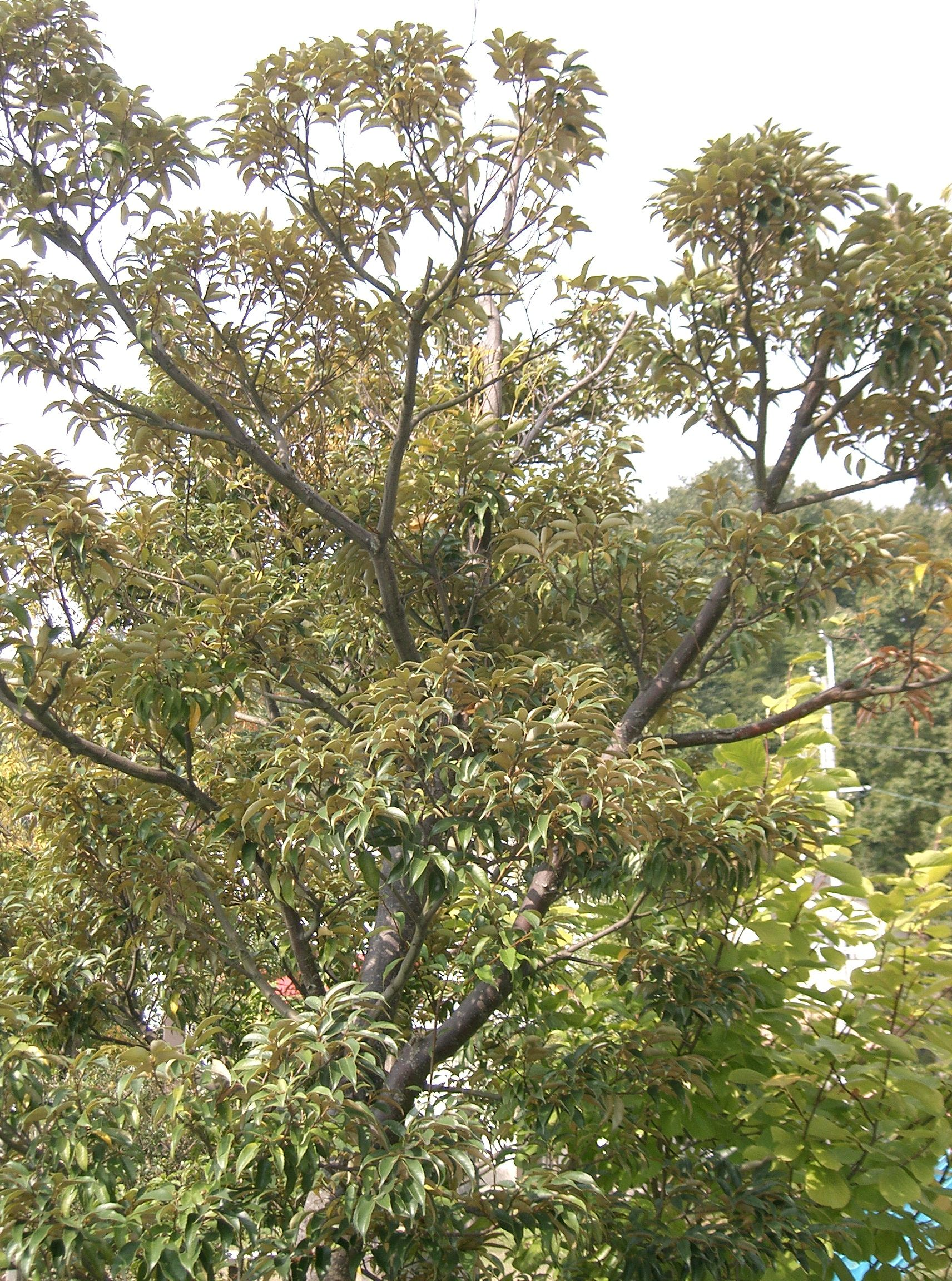

Conservation status
- Least Concern (IUCN 3.1)

Scientific classification
- Kingdom: Plantae
- Clade: Tracheophytes
- Clade: Angiosperms
- Clade: Eudicots
- Clade: Rosids
- Order: Fagales
- Family: Fagaceae
- Genus: Castanopsis
- Species: C. sieboldii

Binomial name
- Castanopsis sieboldii (Makino) Hatus.

Varieties
- Castanopsis sieboldii var. lutchuensis (Koidz.) T.Yamaz. & Mashiba; Castanopsis sieboldii var. sieboldii

Synonyms
- Homotypic Synonyms: Castanopsis cuspidata var. sieboldii (Makino) Nakai; Lithocarpus cuspidatus var. sieboldii (Makino) Nakai; Lithocarpus sieboldii } (Makino) Nakai; Pasania cuspidata var. sieboldii Makino; Pasania sieboldii (Makino) Makino; Pasaniopsis sieboldii (Makino) Kudô; Shiia sieboldii (Makino) Makino; Synaedrys sieboldii (Makino) Koidz.

= Castanopsis sieboldii =

Species of flowering plant

Castanopsis sieboldii is a species of flowering plant in the family Fagaceae. This evergreen tree is sometime referred to by the common names Itajii chinkapin or Itajii. It is native to Japan, including the Ryukyu Islands, and Korea.

This is a climax species that is commonly found in the Japanese temperate rainforest. Specimens are also present within the forest area of the Tokyo Imperial Palace.

Castanopsis sieboldii was once thought to be a subspecies of the similar Castanopsis cuspidata.

Plants and animals associated with this tree include:

- Mitrastemon yamamotoi, a non-photosynthetic plant that parasitizes Castanopsis sieboldii.
- Aspidistra elatior, the cast-iron plant, grows in the understorey.
- Acrocercops mantica, Chrysocercops castanopsidis, and Lymantria albescens larvae of these Asian moths likely mine the leaves.
- Amantis nawai, a small praying mantis species native to Eastern Asia is known to live around C. sieboldii where it eats insects.
- Okinawa rail, a Japanese bird, lives among these trees.

== Gallery ==
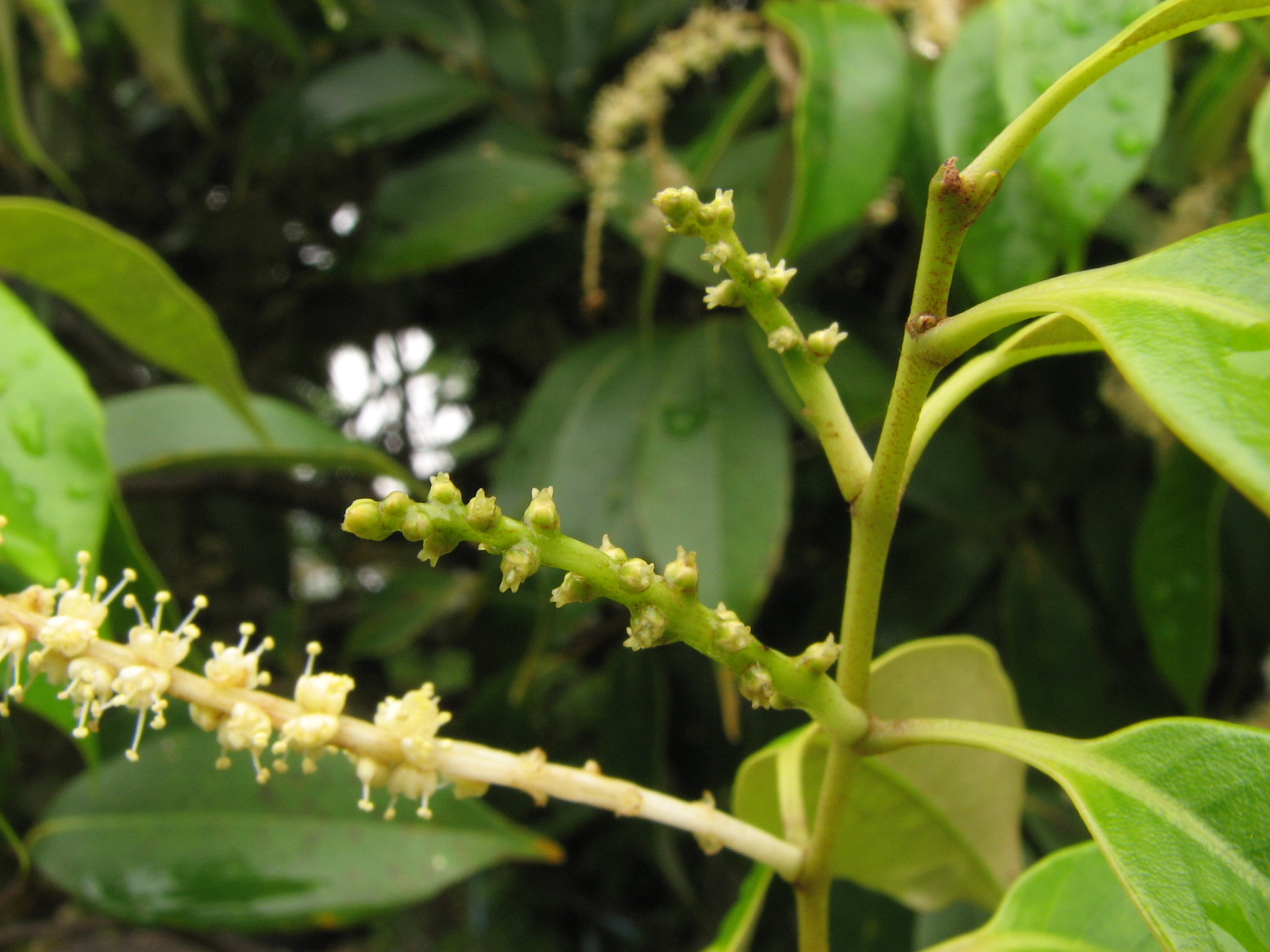
Flower, female

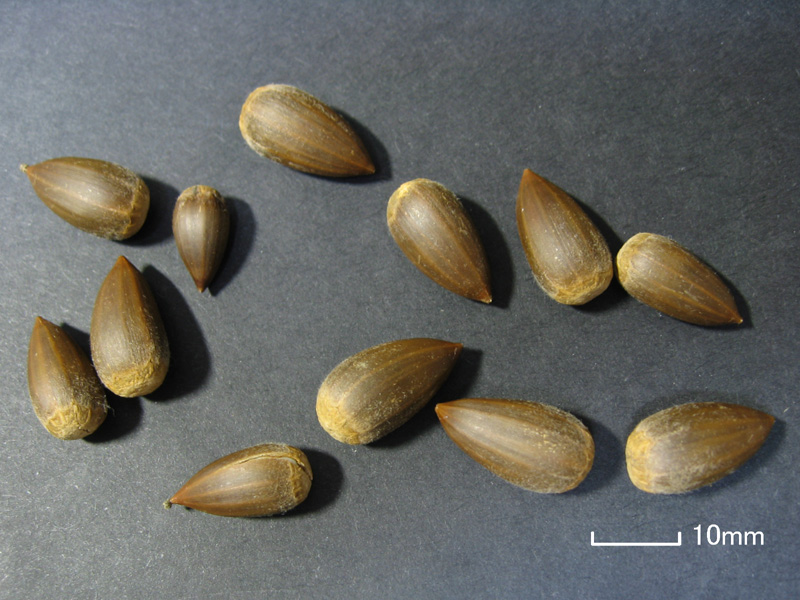
Nuts

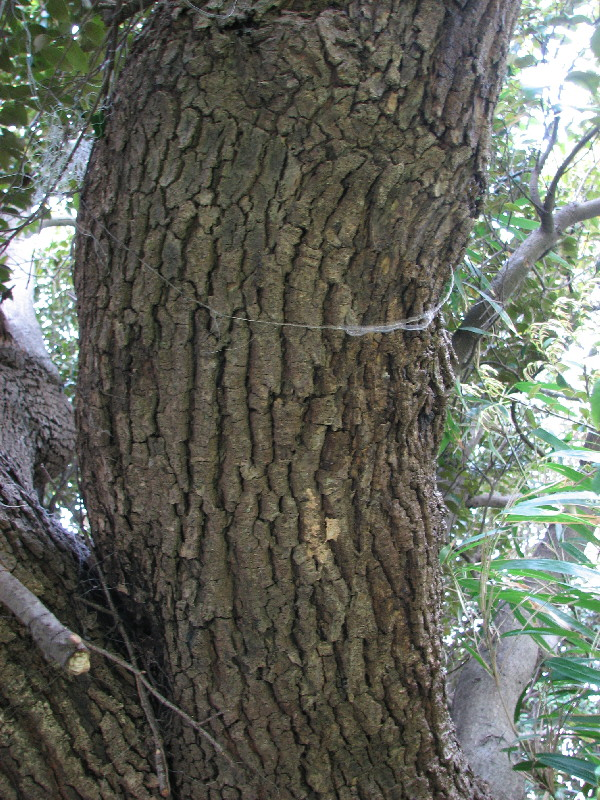
Bark
