= Acrocercops mantica =

Scientific classification
- Domain: Eukaryota
- Kingdom: Animalia
- Phylum: Arthropoda
- Class: Insecta
- Order: Lepidoptera
- Family: Gracillariidae
- Genus: Acrocercops
- Species: A. mantica

Binomial name
- Acrocercops mantica Meyrick, 1908

Synonyms
- Acrocercops delographa Meyrick, 1939

Species of moth

Acrocercops mantica is a moth of the family Gracillariidae. It is known from China (Guangdong), Hong Kong, India (Meghalaya), Indonesia (Java), Japan (Tusima, the Ryukyu Islands, Honshū, Shikoku, Kyūshū), Korea and Nepal.

The wingspan is 7.8-10.2 mm.

The larvae feed on Castanopsis cuspidata, Castanopsis lamontii, Castanopsis sieboldii and Castanopsis tribuloides. They mine the leaves of their host plant.
