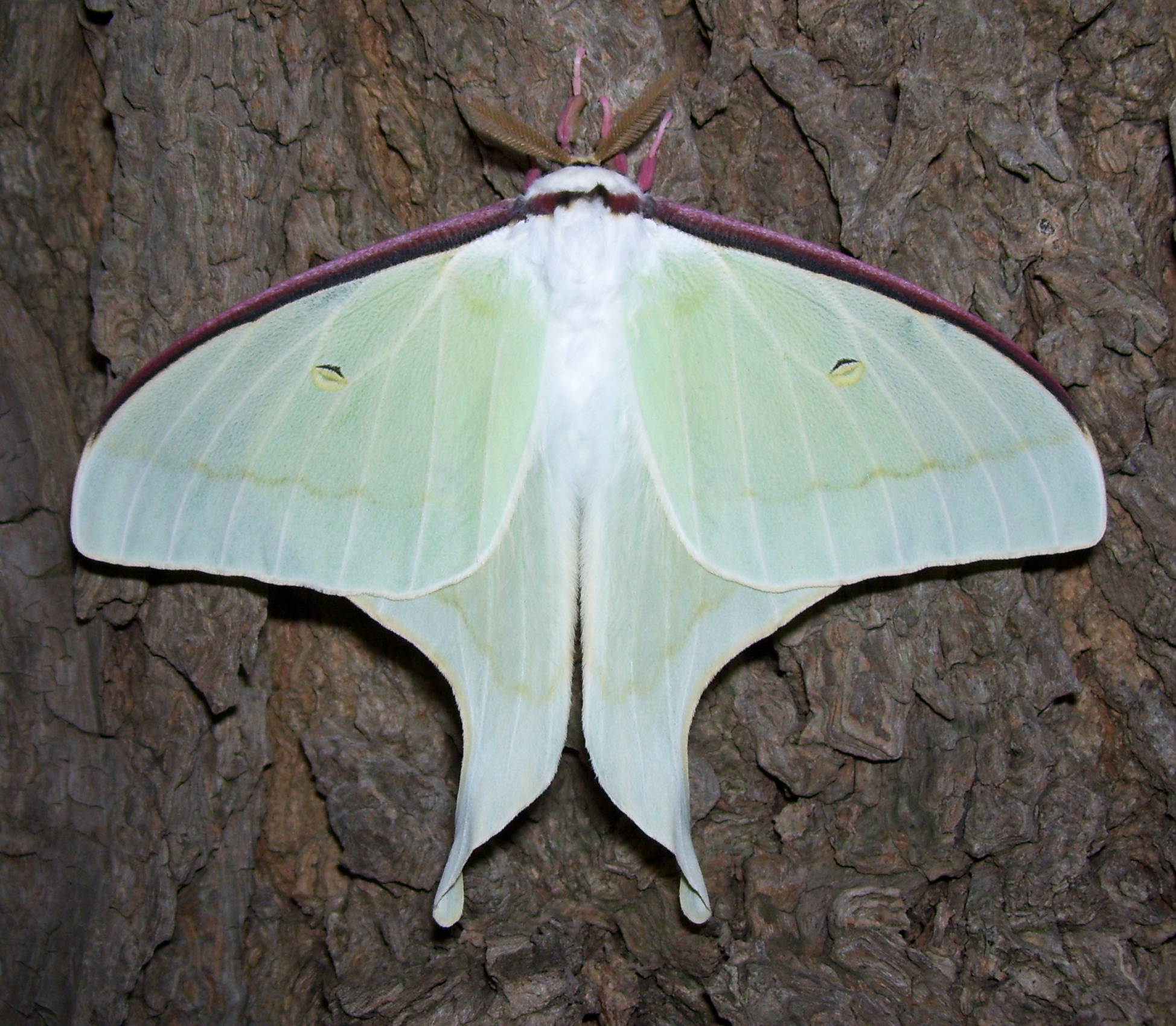

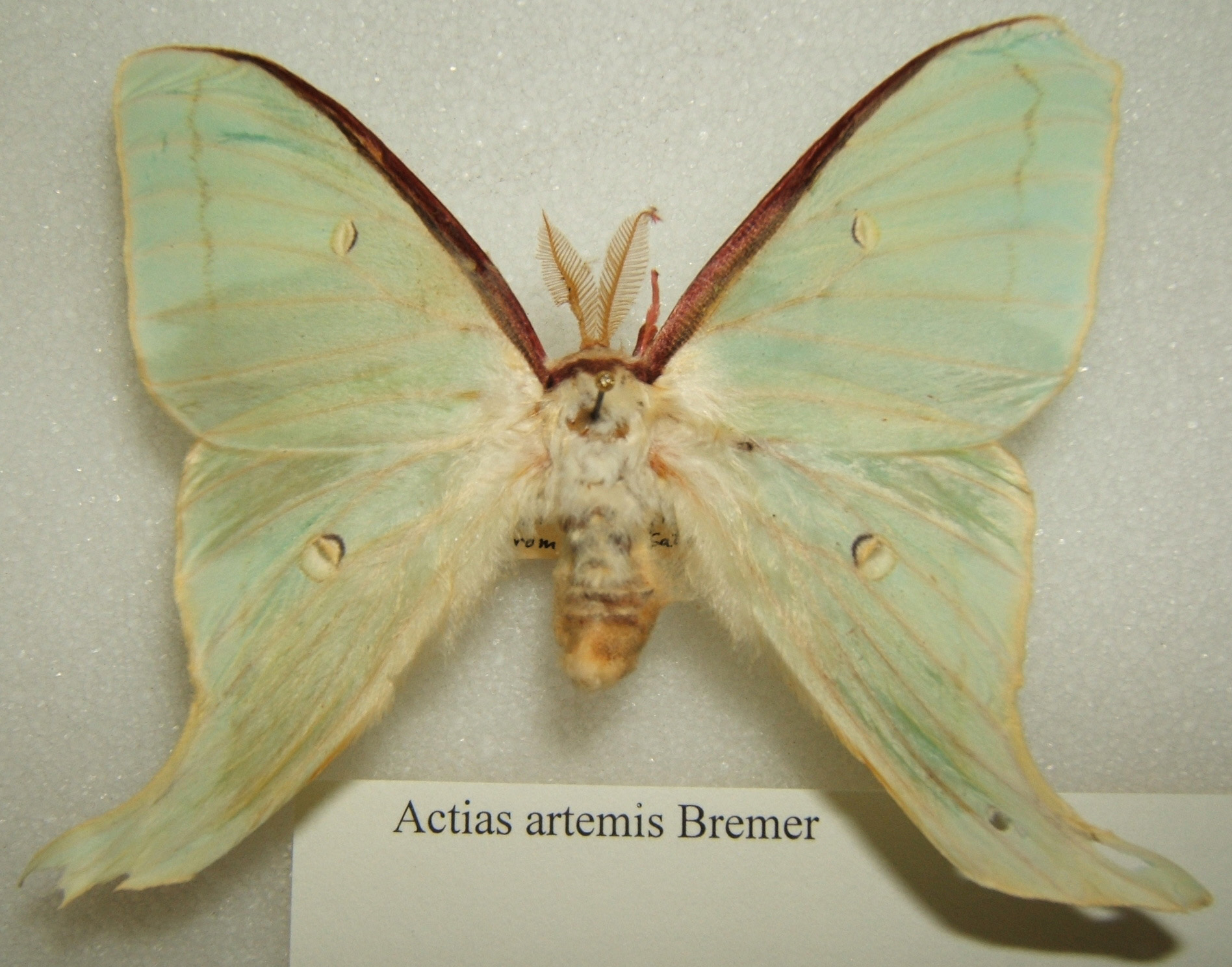
- Adult male

Scientific classification
- Kingdom: Animalia
- Phylum: Arthropoda
- Clade: Pancrustacea
- Class: Insecta
- Order: Lepidoptera
- Family: Saturniidae
- Genus: Actias
- Species: A. artemis

Binomial name
- Actias artemis (Bremer & Grey, 1853)

= Actias artemis =

Species of moth

Actias artemis is a moth native to Russia, Korea, and China. The species was first described by Otto Vasilievich Bremer and William Grey in 1853. Actias artemis is a close relative and look-alike of Actias luna, the American Luna moth.

== Images of life cycle ==
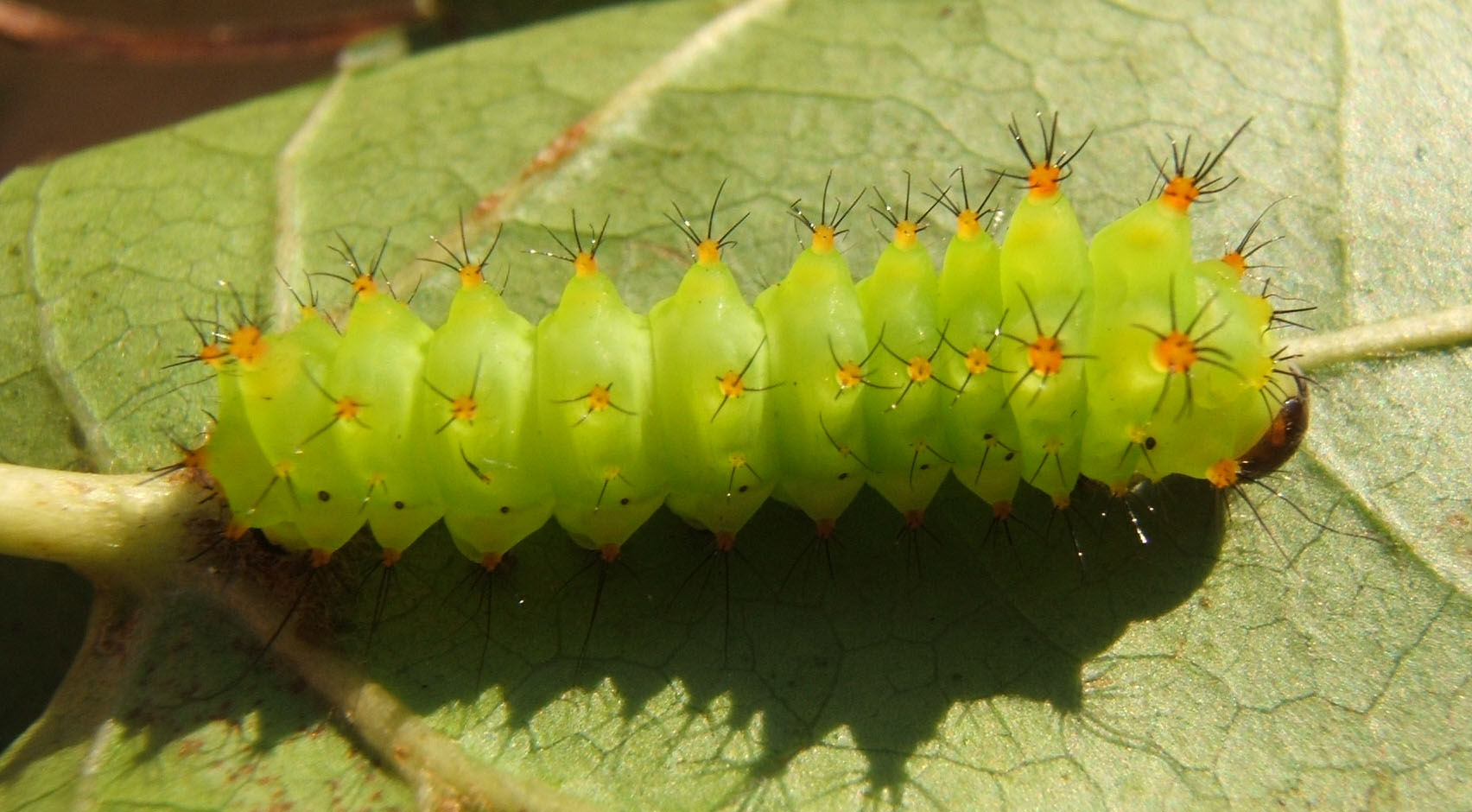
2nd-instar larva reared on American sweetgum

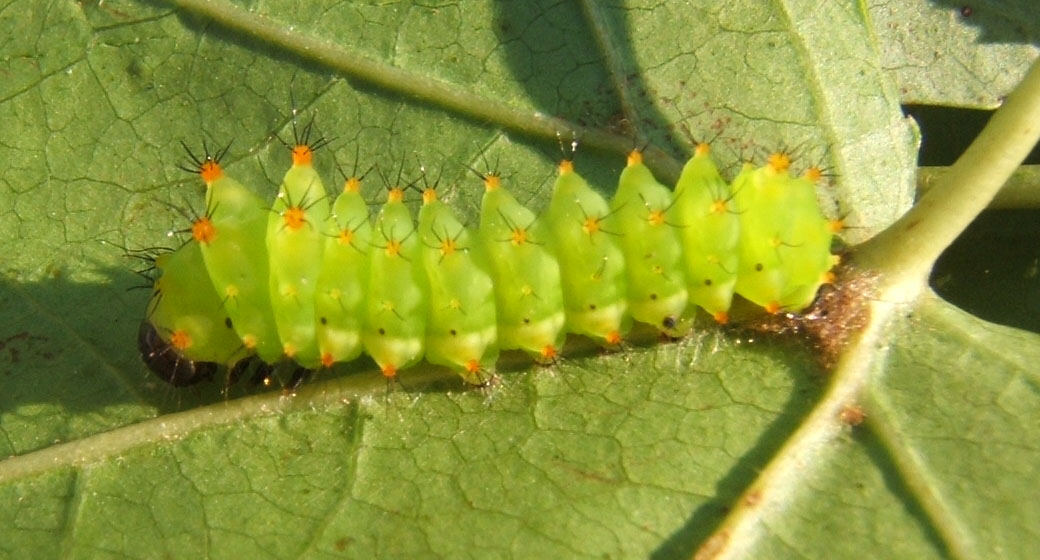
2nd-instar larva

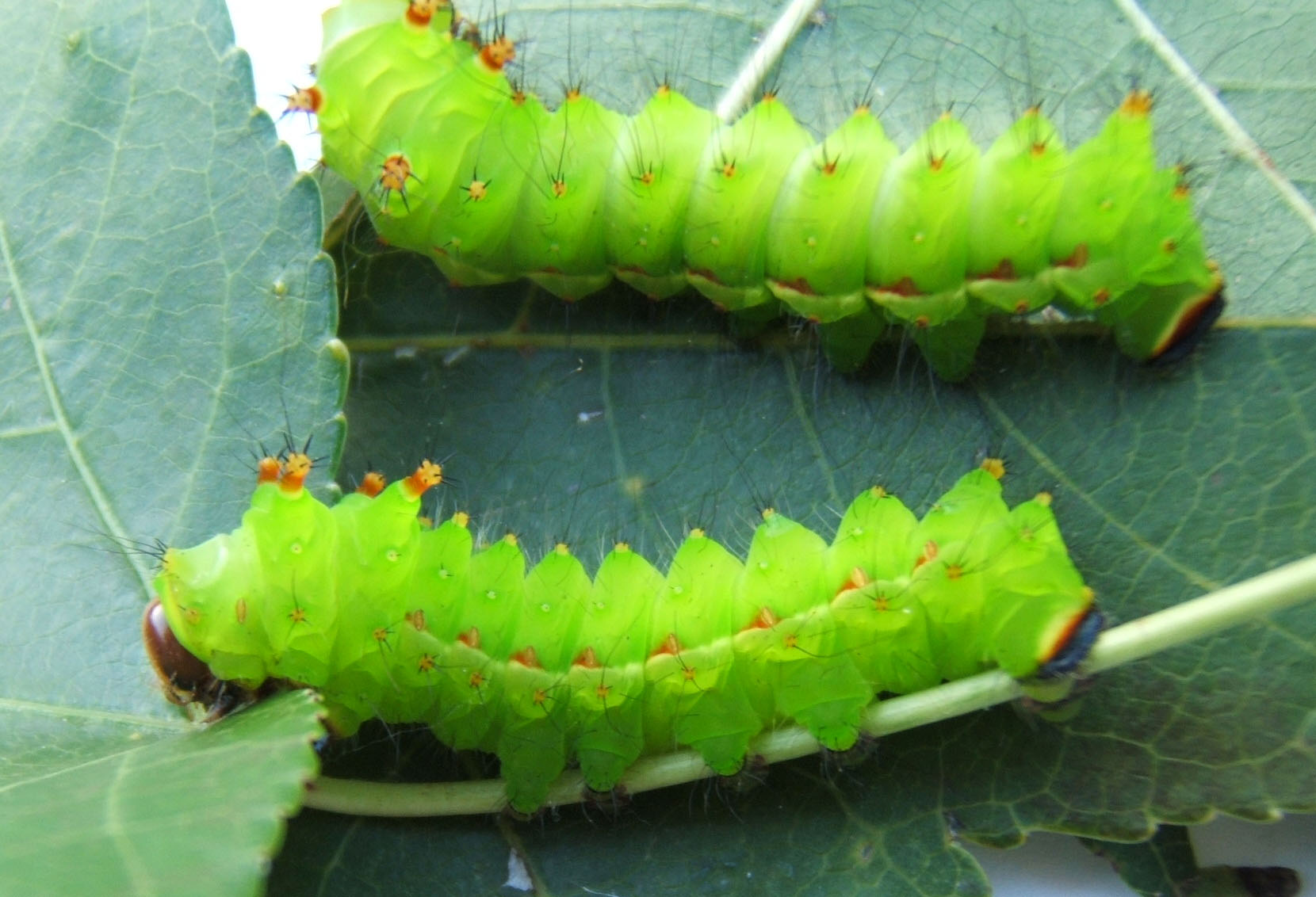
4th-instar larvae

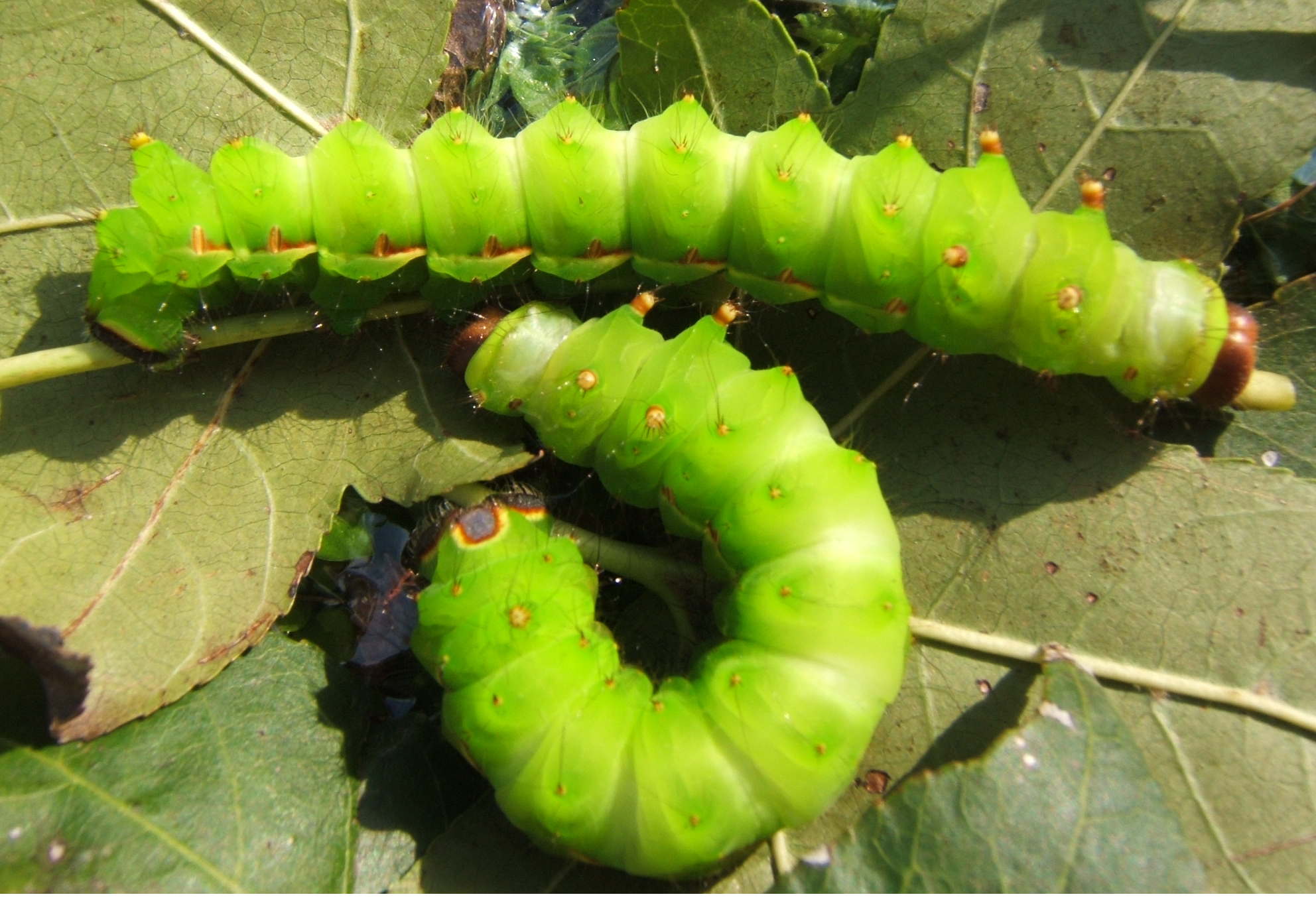
5th-instar larvae

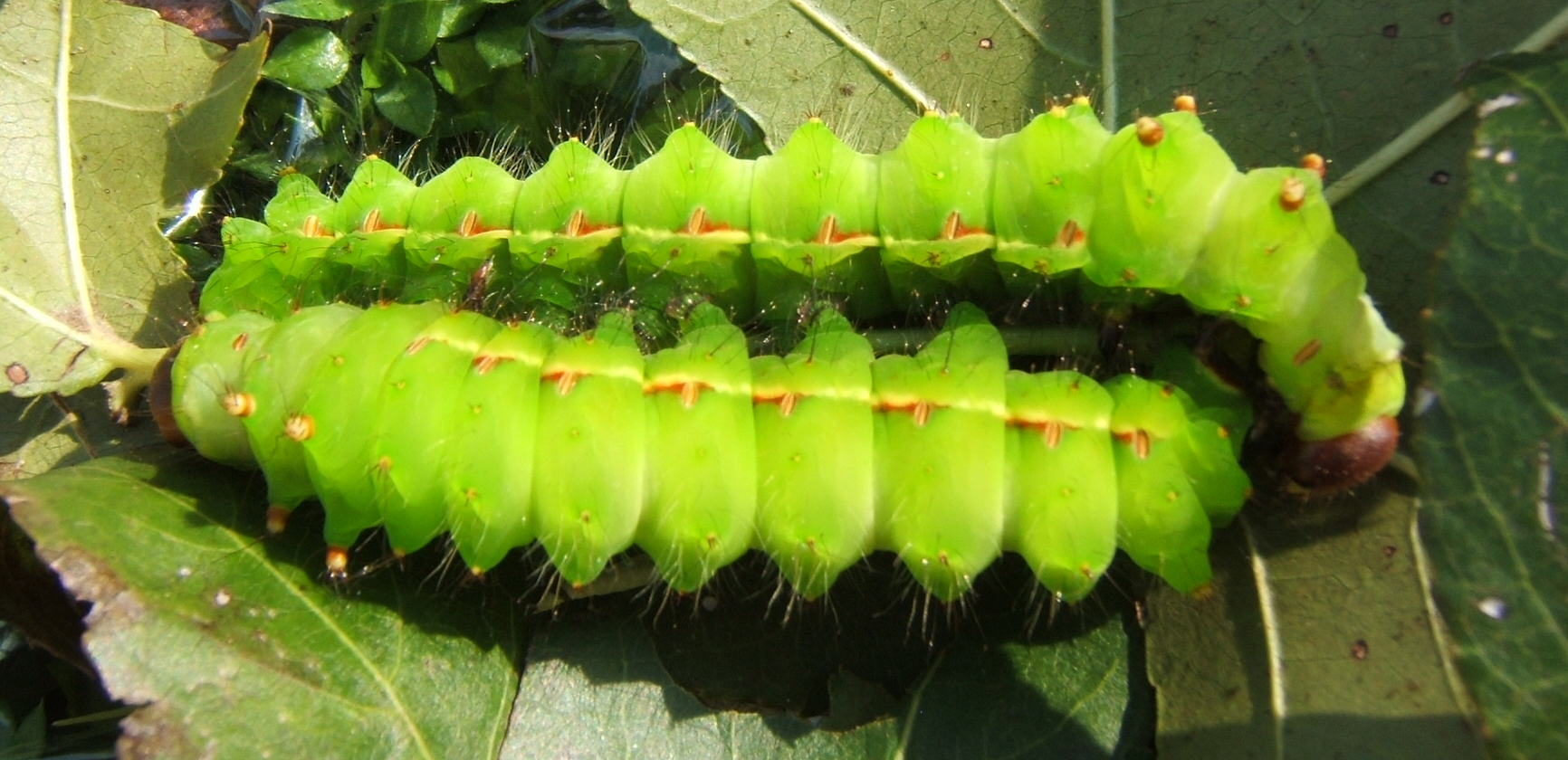
5th-instar larvae

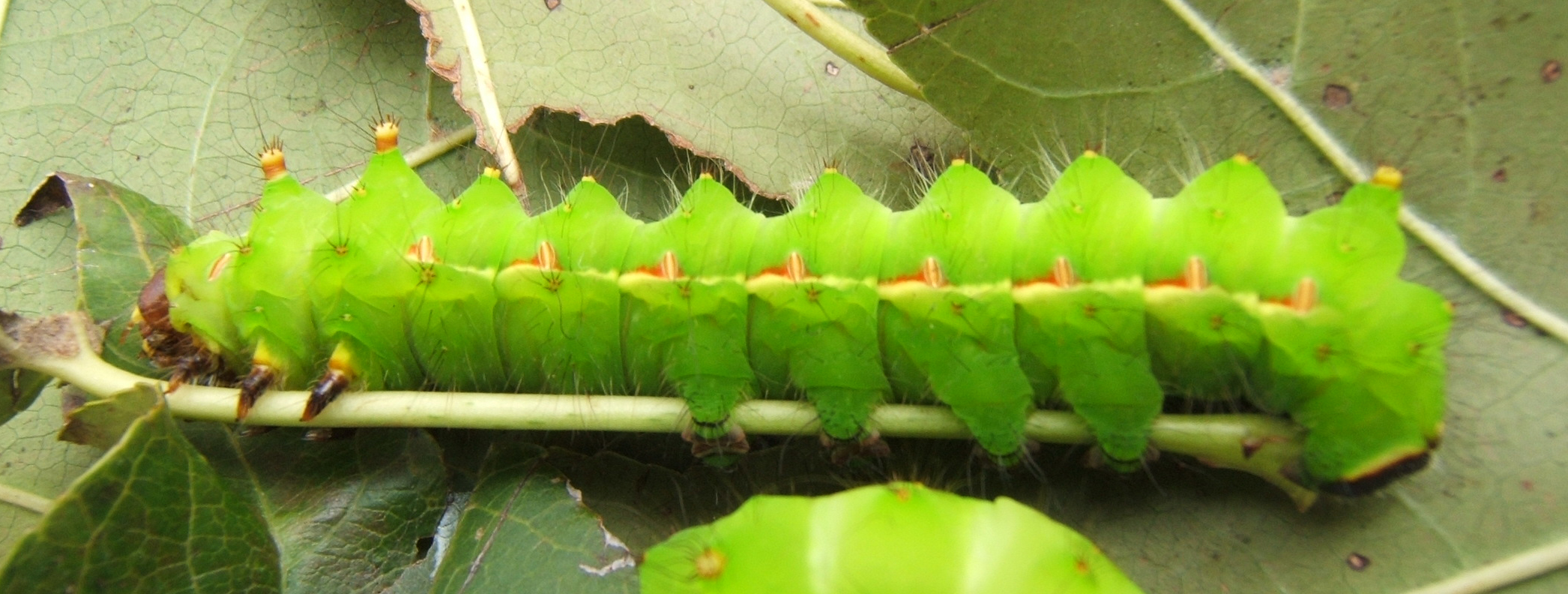
5th-instar larva

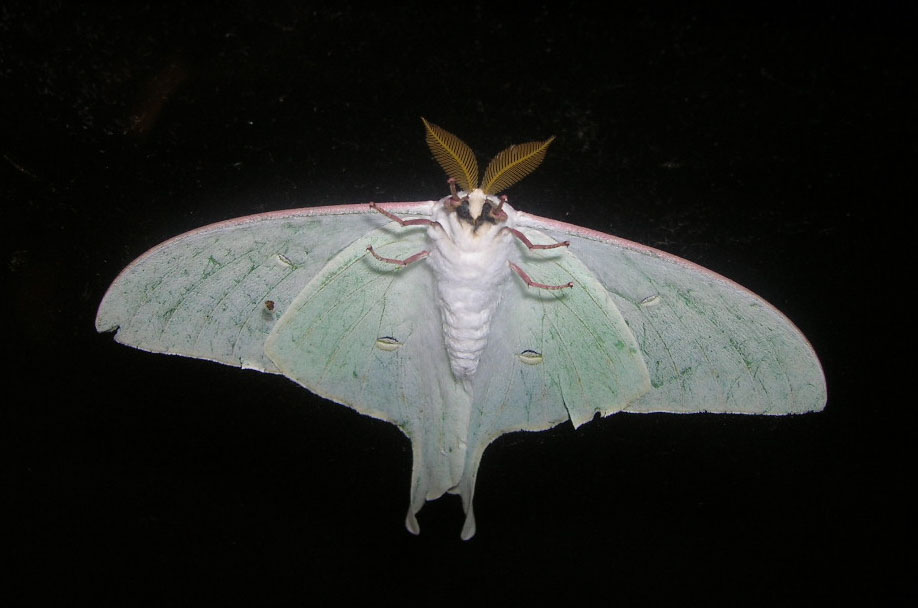
Adult male

== Host plants ==
Larvae can be fed on willow (Salix), alder (Alnus), hickory (Carya), oak, plum, walnut and maple.
