= Japanese temperate rainforest =

Temperate Rainforest in Japan

The Japanese temperate rainforest is located in the Japanese archipelago, in small batches over a wide range of islands, from Kyushu in the South to Hokkaido in the North. Due to its geographic features and climate, the Japanese temperate rainforest is very different from other temperate rainforests in the world. The islands in the Japanese archipelago comprise about 1/400 of the world’s land. The islands are located on a latitude that is normally dry; desert can be found elsewhere in the world at this latitude. However, the oceans surrounding Japan provide enough precipitation to maintain a temperate rainforest.

== General description ==
Japanese temperate rainforest can be classified into three types: the warm temperate zone found in the southern islands and lower elevations in the north, the cool temperate zone found in the northern islands and higher elevations in the south, and the subalpine forest in the higher elevations of northern Honshu and Hokkaido. The distribution of the Japanese temperate rainforest is also highly dependent on altitude; one may see all of three types of temperate rainforest on the higher mountains such as Mount Fuji or Mount Miyanouradake.

== Climate ==
The climate of this region is warm and wet. The mean annual temperature is 6 – 13 °C in the cool temperate zone and 13 – 23 °C in the warm temperate zone. Annual precipitation is 1,200 – 1,800 mm. Some regions have an annual precipitation of more than 2,800 mm. The precipitation pattern of cool and warm temperate zones is almost opposite: the southern warm temperate rainforest has higher precipitation in summer and less precipitation in winter, and the northern cool temperate rainforest has lower precipitation in summer and higher in winter with the snowfall. High precipitation is caused by oceanic circulation and the rain shadow effect. Summer typhoons from the tropics bring warm; moist air to the southern islands, especially on the Pacific Ocean side. Westerly from Siberian High and Tsushima Current cause heavy snowfall on the Sea of Japan side of northern Japan.

== Flora ==
The Japanese temperate rainforest is home to about 5300 plant species, 40 percent of which are unique to Japan. The Japanese archipelago was not influenced by the glacier extension in the last ice age; therefore, it provided refugia for many species. Also, there is no dry, desert area within the islands; thus, flora moved fluently between north and south after the last ice age. In addition, the Japanese islands are isolated, reducing immigration of organisms from the Eurasian continent.

The subalpine (cold) temperate rainforests are dominated by tsuga and fir. Veitch’s fir (Abies veitchii), Maries’ fir (Abies mariesii) and northern Japanese hemlock are commonly seen. Also, Japanese cypress (Chamaecyparis), Thujopsis (also called hiba) can be found there. Other than those trees, broad-leaf trees such as Japanese beech (Fagus crenata) and oak are co-dominant canopy trees in this area. The understory is dominated by the bamboo Sasa veitchii in most lower elevation sites in western Hokkaido. Ferns, sedges (Carex), and shrubs are co-dominant understory species in this area.

The cool temperate rainforest is dominated by Japanese beech (Fagus crenata). Also, Marie's fir, (Abies mariesii), Pinus pumila, oak (Quercus crispula), and Japanese cypress are commonly seen in the cool temperate zone. The understory is dominated by another bamboo species called Chisimazasa (Sasa kurilensis); willow and shrubs such as (Camellia rusticana) are also common in this zone.

The warm temperate rainforest is dominated by Japanese cedar (Cryptomeria), Japanese stone oak (Lithocarpus edulis), and Castanopsis sieboldii. Trochodendron, Isu tree (Distylium racemosum), oak (Quercus crispula), and Machilus thunbergii are co-dominant trees in the warm temperate zone. The understory is dominated by another Sasa species called moso bamboo (Phyllostachys edulis), and Rhododendron, and Rhododendron subg. Hymenanthes. The warm temperate rainforest is home to a great diversity of lichen and mosses due to the warm temperature and high precipitation.

== Fauna ==
Temperate rainforests, especially old-growth forests, provide quality habitat for many species, including natural monument animals or those on the IUCN Red List—species such as the black woodpecker, Japanese black bear, Japanese dormouse, Japanese giant salamander, Japanese serow, Japanese macaque, Japanese golden eagle, sika deer, Japanese grass lizard, and Japanese rat snake. Larger mammals, such as sika deer and Japanese macaque, are commonly seen in all of the temperate zones, but most amphibians and small mammals are unique to each zone. Some species, such as the black woodpecker, live in only old-growth forests and the ongoing loss of their habitat is a serious problem for these species.

== Historical usage ==
Most of the Japanese temperate rainforest has been logged and used as fuel and building materials over time. Before industrial development, people lived with the forest; they respected the forest and mountains. Mountain worship and mountain asceticism have been very common in Japan through the ages. However, industry and war have forced people to cut the forest. The natural old-growth forest has declined rapidly with economic development and the government's policies. Some areas are turned into plantation forest (secondary forest) of Japanese cedar, Quercus serrate, and sawtooth oak (Quercus acutissime).

These forests are known as Satoyama and were well-managed until the government changed its policies again. Takeuchi explains Satoyama as “secondary woodlands and grassland near human settlements that have traditionally used these lands as coppices and meadows for fuel, fertilizer, and fodder.” Increased importing of fossil fuel and timber changed the value of Satoyama in the 1960s. The Japanese forest industry was reduced and people lost interest in forest management and timber harvesting. The population’s aging and loss of timber jobs caused a population decrease in a rural area, which made it difficult to maintain the Satoyama area. Today, however, society’s attention is being pulled back to the function of Satoyama and people have started to maintain the forest again.

== Disturbance and conservation ==
Common disturbances in Japanese temperate rainforests are triggered by typhoons that have a strong influence on both the forests and human populations. Typhoons cause trees to fall as well as floods and landslides. Although some trees falling is a normal part of the forest lifecycle, large numbers of trees falling all at once can alter or damage the ecosystem.

Other recent concerns include damage by animals. Insect infestation and sika deer foraging have become big issues. Infestations by insects have increased rapidly since the 1980s, especially in the last decade, and have impacted the forestry industry. The sika deer's foraging has a less direct impact on the forest itself; however, it represents about 60% of all damage from animals. The deer also eat seedlings, which increases the risk of future canopy decline. Occasionally, sika deer attack orchards in search of food; this may suggest overpopulation of sika deer, possibly due to human impact on their habitat. Ongoing losses from land conversion and climate change also represent serious threats to the conservation of Japanese temperate rainforests.
