= Minami River =

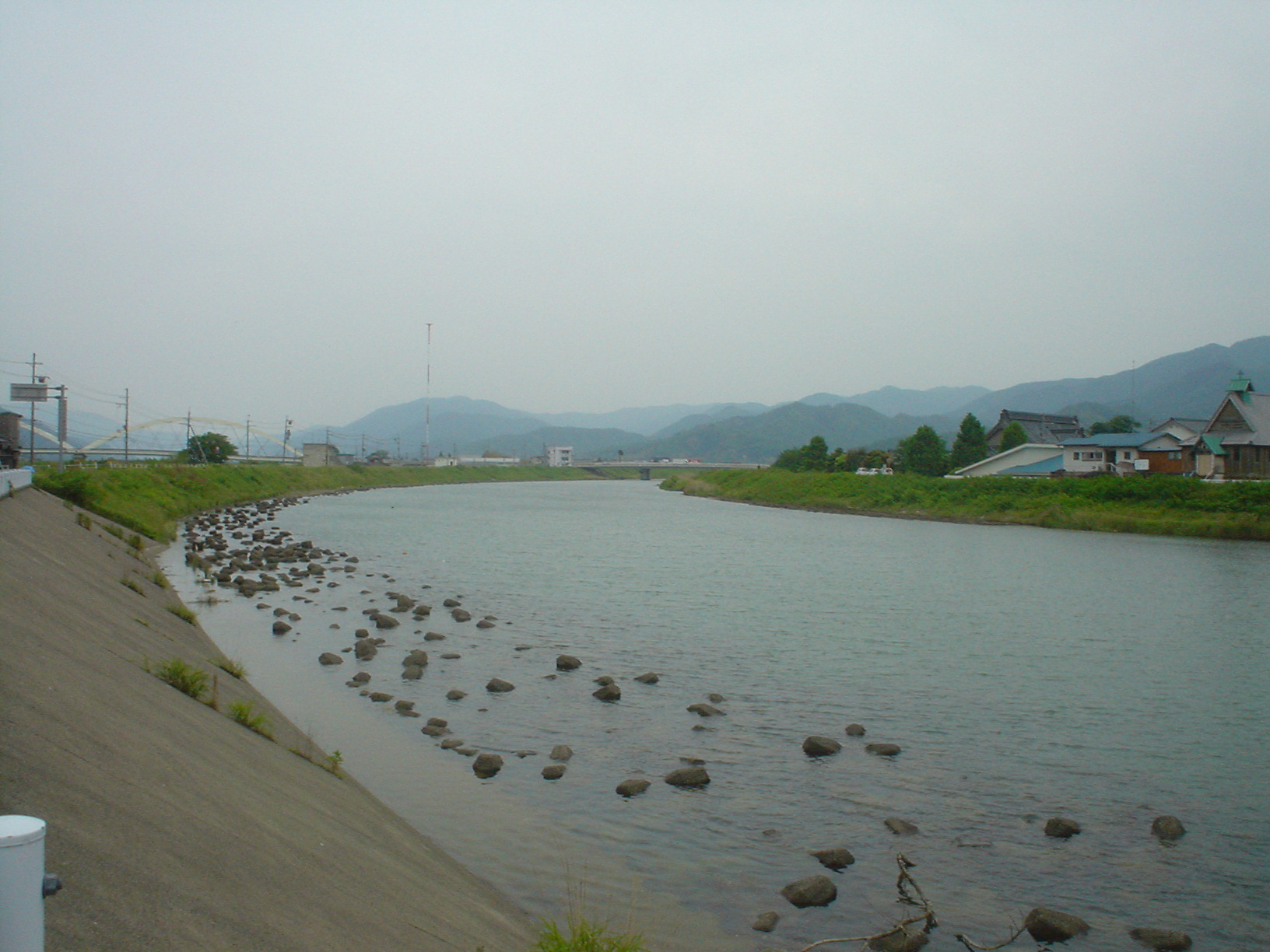
- Minami River in 2007

- Minami River location in Fukui Prefecture.
- Native name: 南川 (Japanese)

Location
- Country: Japan
- State: Honshu
- Region: Fukui
- Municipalities: Ōi, Obama

Physical characteristics
- Source: Tokinzan
  - location: Ōi, Fukui Prefecture and Ayabe, Kyoto Prefecture
  - coordinates: 35.377222°N 135.534444°E
  - elevation: 564 m (1,850 ft)
- Mouth: Obama Bay
  - location: Obama, Fukui
  - coordinates: 35°30′14″N 135°44′20″E
  - elevation: 0 m (0 ft)
- Length: 34 km (21 mi)
- Basin size: 460 km^{2} (180 mi^{2})

Basin features
- Tributaries
  - left: Sakamoto River; Tamura River
  - right: Somegatani River; Kuda River; Fukaya River

The Minami River (南川, Minami-gawa) is a river in Fukui Prefecture, Japan. It is designated Class B by the Ministry of Land, Infrastructure, Transport and Tourism (MLIT). It empties into Obama Bay, a sub-bay of Wakasa Bay on the Sea of Japan about 280 metres (920 ft) southwest of the mouth of the Kita River.

== Geography and development ==
The source of the Minami River is found near Amaki Pass on the slopes of Tokinzan (a mountain straddling the border between Ōi, Fukui Prefecture and Ayabe, Kyoto Prefecture) about 564 metres (1,850 ft) above sea level. Minami River Sabō Dam (南川砂防ダム, Minami-gawa Sabō Damu) is located a few kilometers below the headwaters of the river. The river travels for 34 kilometres (21 mi) through the municipalities of Ōi (in Ōi District) and Obama before emptying into Obama Bay right next to the mouths of the Kita and Tada Rivers.

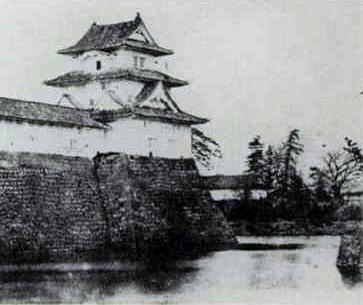
Obama Castle prior to 1874.

The drainage basin for the river covers 460 square kilometres (180 mi^{2}). The Fukaya, Kubotani, and Kuda Rivers in Ōi, and the Makitani, Okutanawa, Sakamoto, Somegatani, Sunawa, and Tamura Rivers in Obama are all tributaries. The Ministry of Land, Infrastructure, Transport and Tourism designated the Minami a Class B river. Japan National Route 162 runs alongside the Minami River from just below the Buddhist temple Dankeiji to near the river's mouth at Obama Bay.

Obama Castle was built on the narrow delta formed by the mouths of the Minami, Kita, and Tada Rivers, giving the castle natural protection due to the rivers and Obama Bay protecting it on three sides.

=== Flooding ===
In September 1953, heavy rainfall from Typhoon Tess caused major flooding along the Minami River and its tributaries, destroying many fields, damaging ships, and injuring or killing almost nearly 500 people. Typhoon Trix in 1971 also caused major flooding, crop damage, and loss of life.

=== Tributaries ===
The Minami River has several main tributaries.

- Fukaya River (五十谷川, Fukaya-gawa) (Obama)
- Kubotani River (窪谷川, Kubotani-gawa) (Obama)
- Kuda River (久田川, Kuda-gawa) (Ōi)
- Makitani River (槇谷川, Makitani-gawa) (Ōi)
- Okutanawa River (奥田縄川, Okutanawa-gawa) (Obama)
- Sakamoto River (坂本川, Sakamoto-gawa) (Ōi)
- Somegatani River (染ヶ谷川, Somegatani-kawa) (Ōi)
- Sunawa River (須縄川, Sunawa-gawa) (Obama)
- Tamura River (田村川, Tamura-gawa) (Obama)

== Flora and fauna ==
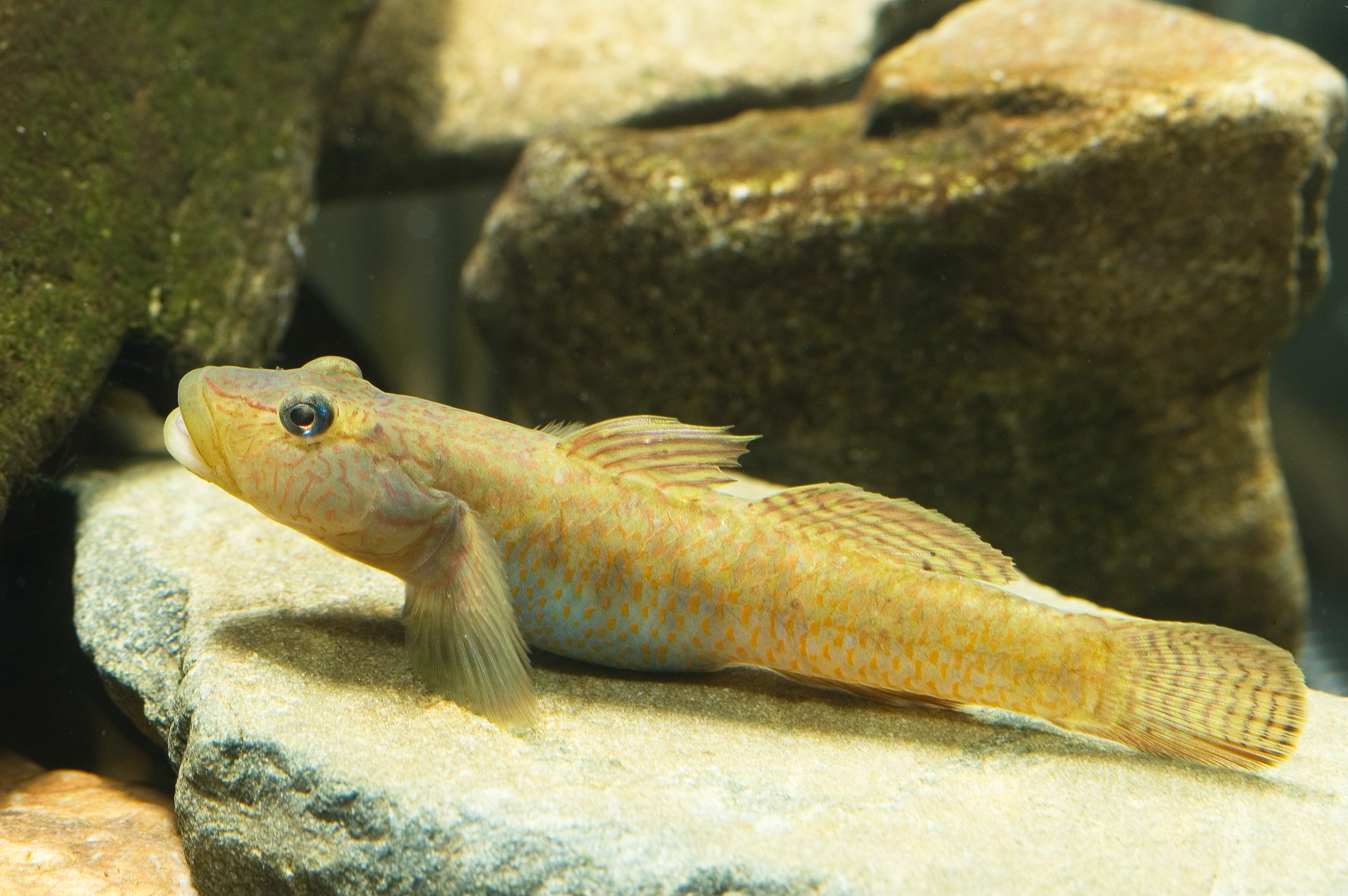
Rhinogobius sp. 'CB'

The Minami River is home to many types of fish and other animals.

- Amur catfish
- Ayu sweetfish
- Big-scaled redfin
- Dark chub
- Dark sleeper
- Eurasian carp
- Flathead grey mullet
- Fourspine sculpin
- Ginbuna
- Grass puffer
- Gymnogobius:
  - G. scrobiculatus
  - G. urotaenia
- Ice goby
- Japanese fluvial sculpin
- Japanese gudgeon
- Japanese river goby
- Japanese sea bass
- Japanese striped loach
- Leiognathus nuchalis
- Lethenteron:
  - Arctic lamprey
  - Far Eastern brook lamprey
- Liobagrus reinii
- Oily bitterling
- Oncorhynchus:
  - Cherry trout
  - Chum salmon
  - Rainbow trout
  - Red-spotted masu salmon
- Pale chub
- Pond loach
- Phoxinus:
  - P. jouyi
  - P. steindachneri
- Pungtungia herzi
- Rhinogobius:
  - R. sp. CB
  - Lizard goby
  - R. giurinus
  - R. sp. LD
- Whitespotted char
- Sarcocheilichthys variegatus microoculus
- Sharp-nosed sand goby
- Squalidus gracilis
- Tachysurus nudiceps (Pseudobagrus nudiceps)
- Tridentiger:
  - T. brevispinis
  - T. obscuras
