= Kita River =

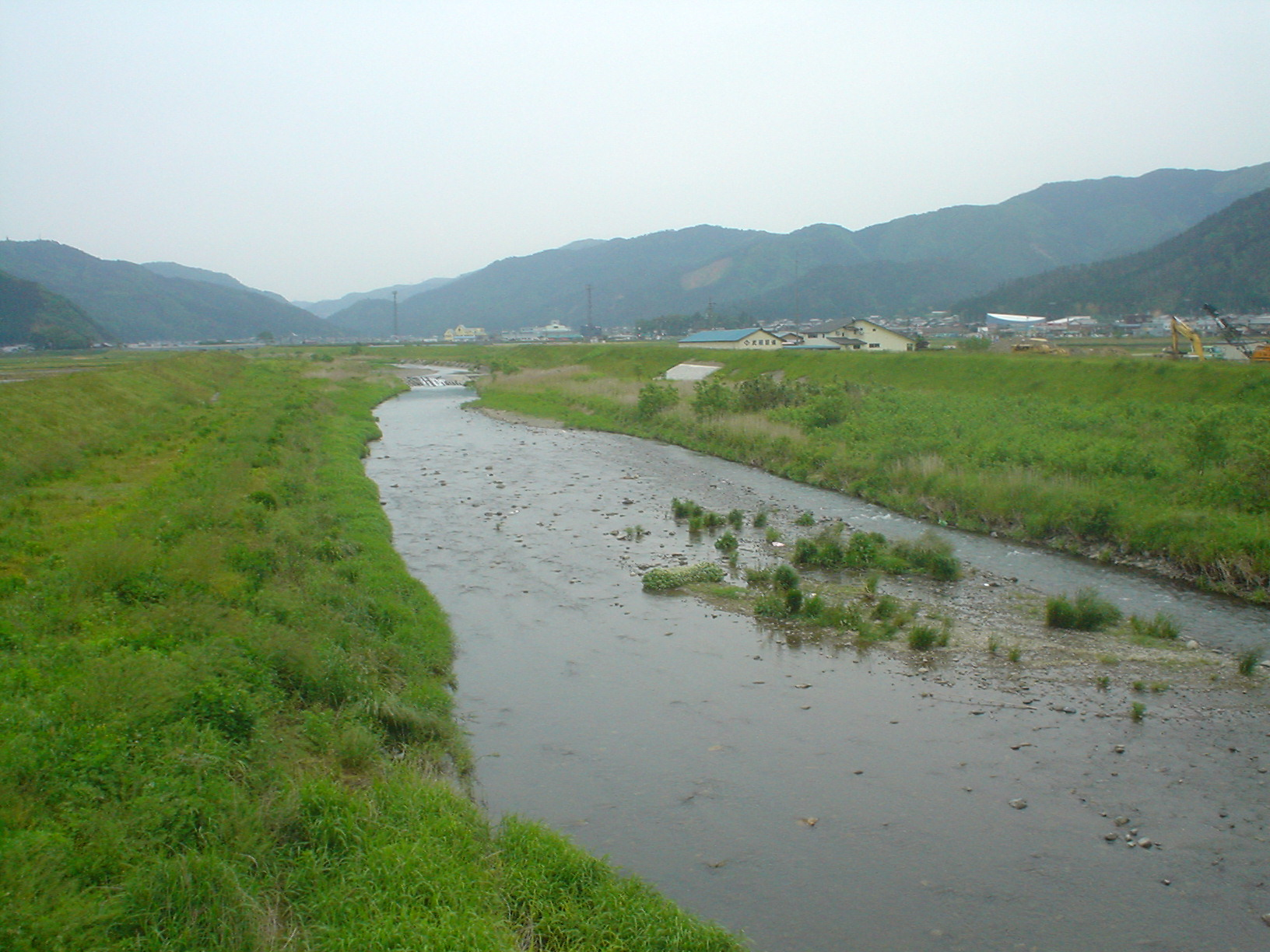
- Kita River in 2007

- Location within Japan
- Native name: 北川 (Japanese)

Location
- Country: Japan
- State: Honshu
- Region: Shiga, Fukui

Physical characteristics
- Source: Mount Sanjūsangen
  - location: Takashima, Shiga Prefecture, Japan
  - coordinates: 35.5186081°N 135.9385466°E
  - elevation: 842 m (2,762 ft)
- Mouth: Obama Bay
  - location: Obama, Fukui
  - coordinates: 35°30′26″N 135°44′31″E
  - elevation: 0 m (0 ft)
- Length: 30.3 km (18.8 mi)
- Basin size: 210.2 km^{2} (81.2 mi^{2})
- Discharge
  - average: 9.51 m^{3} (336 ft^{3})

Basin features
- Tributaries
  - left: Samukaze River; Kōchi River; Onyū River; Matsunaga River
  - right: Amasu River; Toba River; Nogi River; Eko River

The Kita River (北川, Kita-gawa) is a river in Shiga and Fukui Prefectures, Japan. It is designated a Class A river by the Ministry of Land, Infrastructure, Transport and Tourism (MLIT). It empties into Obama Bay, a sub-bay of Wakasa Bay on the Sea of Japan about 280 metres (920 ft) northeast of the mouth of the Minami River. It has been ranked among the best rivers in Japan for water quality since 1981.

== Geography ==
The source of the Kita River is found at an elevation of about 842 metres (2,762 ft) on the slopes of Mount Sanjūsangen in Takashima, Shiga Prefecture, Japan. Its length is 30.3 kilometres (18.8 mi) from its source to its mouth.

It flows in a generally northwesterly direction, with the Toba River joining it in Wakasa and the Onyū River in Obama. Its left-hand tributaries include the Samukaze, Kōchi, Onyū, and Matsunaga Rivers, and its right-hand tributaries include the Amasu, Toba, Nogi, and Eko Rivers.

Its drainage basin covers an area of 210.2 square kilometres (81.2 mi^{2}), with approximately 80 percent of that in mountainous terrain. The drainage basin is about 83 percent forest, 13 percent agricultural, and 4 percent other use such as residential and commercial. Since 1981, it has been ranked as the top Class A river for water quality among those overseen by the Kinki Regional Development Bureau.

Uriwari Falls is located 1.5 kilometres (0.93 mi) southwest of the confluence of the Toba River with the Kita River. These falls are ranked 36th in the top 100 famous water features of Japan as named by the Ministry of the Environment. Unose, a series of rapids on the Onyū, is located 4 kilometres (2.5 mi) downstream from where Route 27 crosses the Onyū River (about 500 metres (1,600 ft) from the Onyū's confluence with the Matsunaga River, and about 1.5 kilometres (0.93 mi) from where the Matsunaga meets the Kita).

=== Drainage basin and tributaries ===
The Kita River drainage basin is contained with the city of Takashima in Shiga Prefecture, and the city of Obama and the town of Wakasa in Fukui Prefecture. The river has several main tributaries, listed here in order from the source in Takashima to the mouth at Obama Bay in Obama.

- Amasu River (天増川, Amasu-gawa) (Takashima) (source)
- Samukaze River (寒風川, Samukaze-gawa) (Takashima)
- Kōchi River (河内川, Kōchi-gawa) (Wakasa)
- Toba River (鳥羽川, Toba-gawa) (Wakasa)
- Nogi River (野木川, Nogi-gawa) (Wakasa)
- Onyū River (遠敷川, Onyū-gawa) (Obama)
- Matsunaga River (松永川, Matsunaga-gawa) (Obama)
- Eko River (江古川, Eko-gawa) (Obama)

== Flora and fauna ==
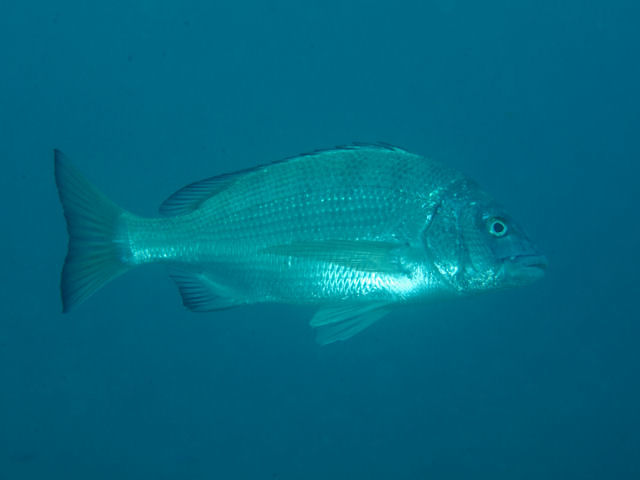
Black seabream

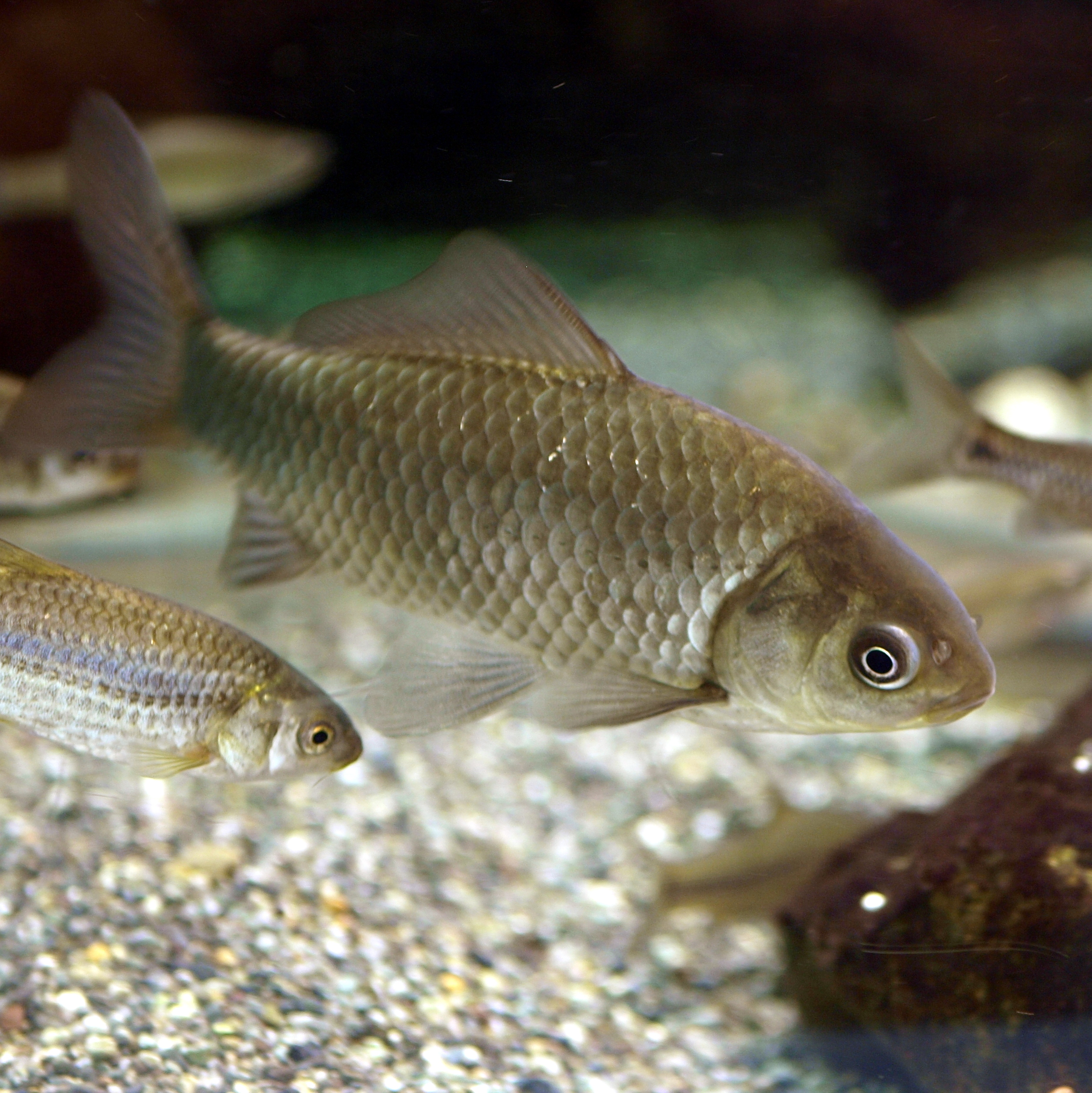
Ginbuna

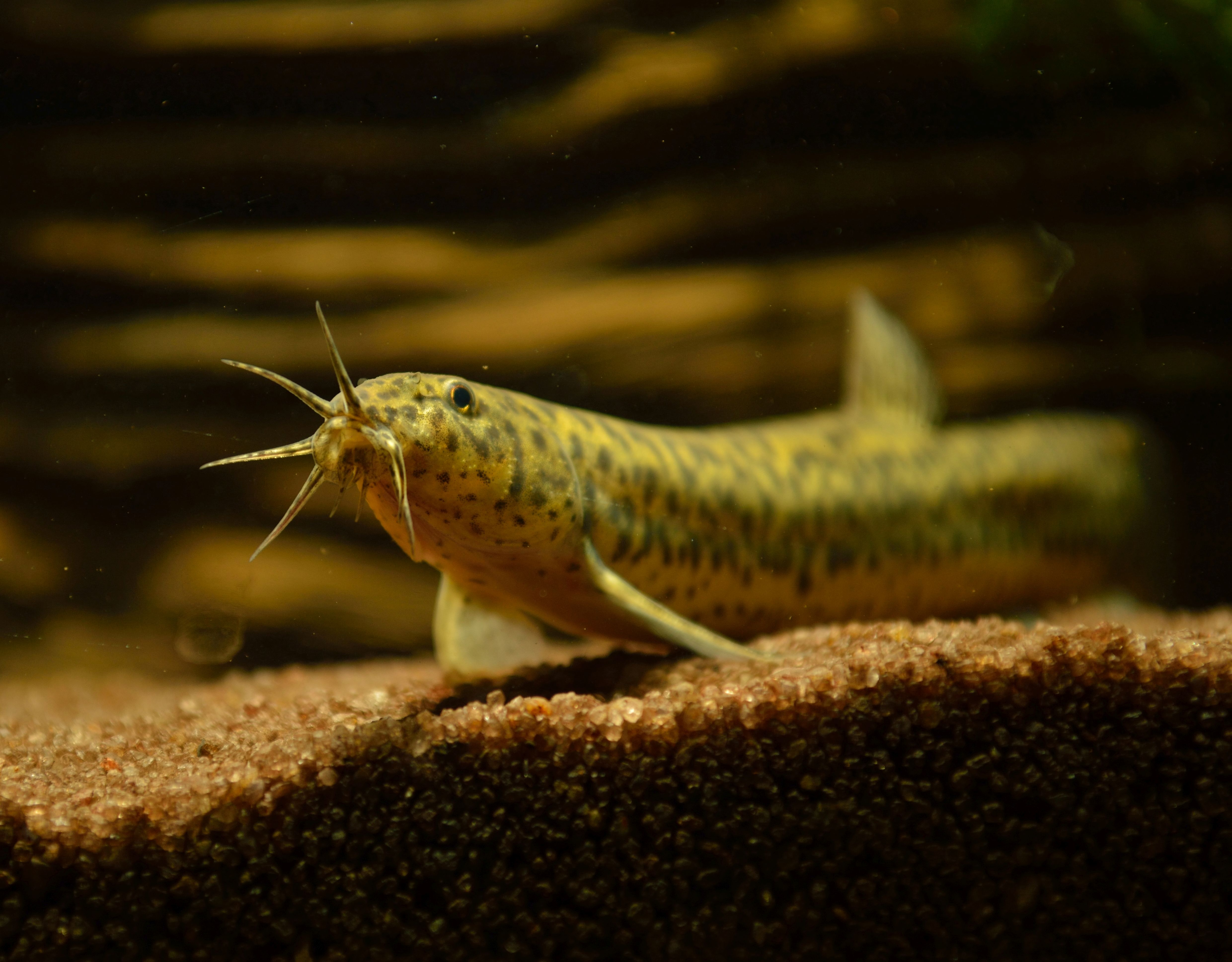
Pond loach

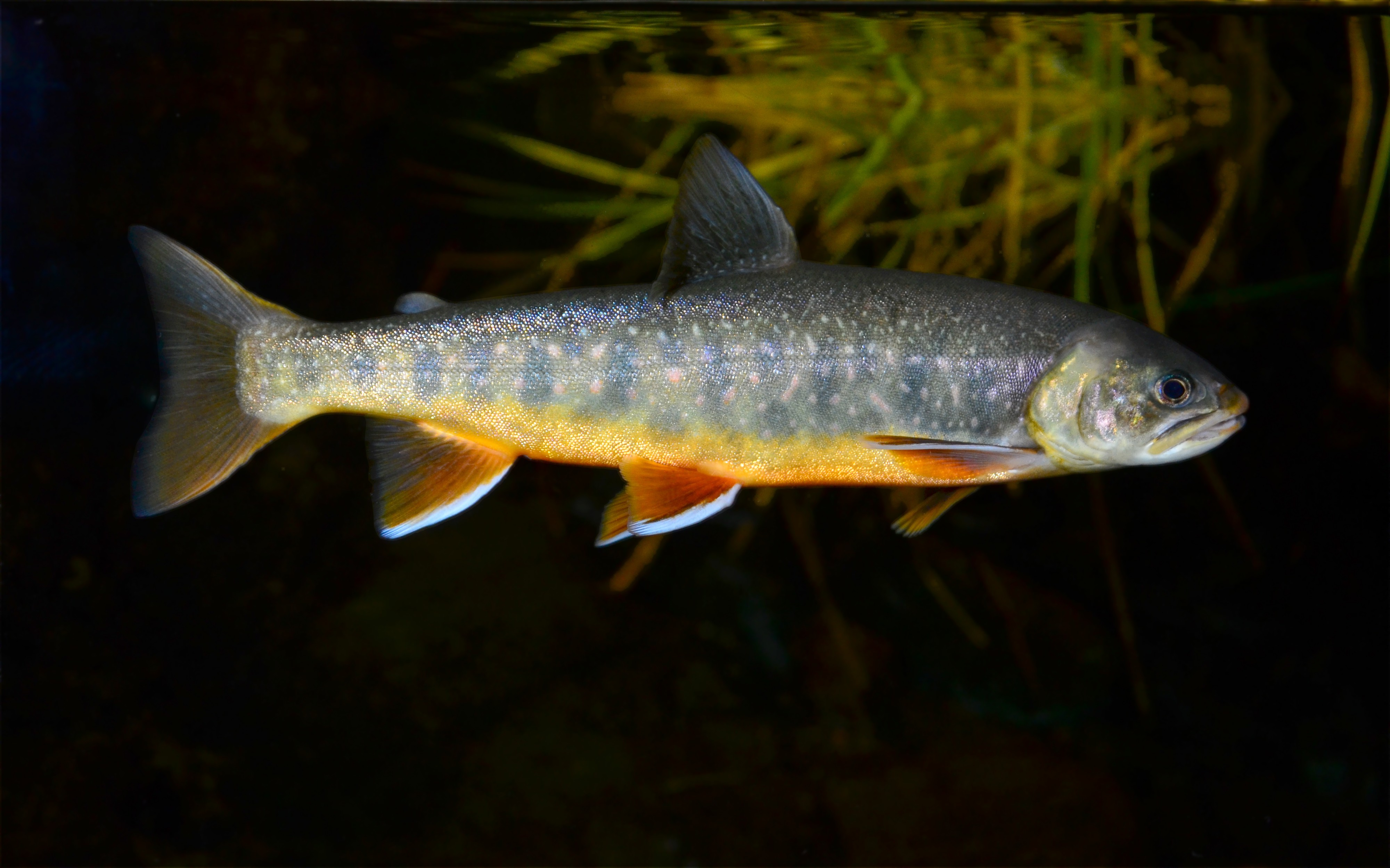
Whitespotted char

The Kita River is home to many types of fish and other animals.

- Arctic lamprey
- Ayu sweetfish
- Big-scaled redfin
- Blackhead seabream
- Dark chub
- Dark sleeper
- Eurasian carp
- Flathead grey mullet
- Fourspine sculpin
- Ginbuna
- Grass puffer
- Gymnogobius urotaenia
- Japanese fluvial sculpin
- Japanese gudgeon
- Japanese river goby
- Japanese sea bass
- Japanese striped loach
- Japanese white crucian carp
- Leiognathus nuchalis
- Liobagrus reinii
- Oncorhynchus:
  - Cherry trout
  - Red-spotted masu salmon
- Pale chub
- Phoxinus:
  - P. jouyi
  - P. steindachneri
- Pond loach
- Pungtungia herzi
- Rhinogobius:
  - R. sp. CB
  - R. giurinus
  - R. sp. LD
- Sharpbeak terapon
- Squalidus gracilis
- Tridentiger:
  - Shimofuri goby
  - T. brevispinis
  - T. obscuras
- Whitespotted char

== Development ==
The JR West Obama Line follows the river from near the junction of Japan National Routes 303 and 27 and where Route 27 crosses the Matsunaga River. The Maizuru-Wakasa Expressway crosses the Kita about 1.4 kilometres (0.87 mi) north of the intersection of Routes 27 and 162, at which it crosses the Tada River.

=== Flooding ===
In September 1953, heavy rainfall from Typhoon Tess caused major flooding along the Kita River and its tributaries, destroying many fields and injuring or killing almost nearly 500 people. This was the largest flooding of the river and its tributaries since 1896.
