= Obama Bay =

- 小浜湾 (Japanese)
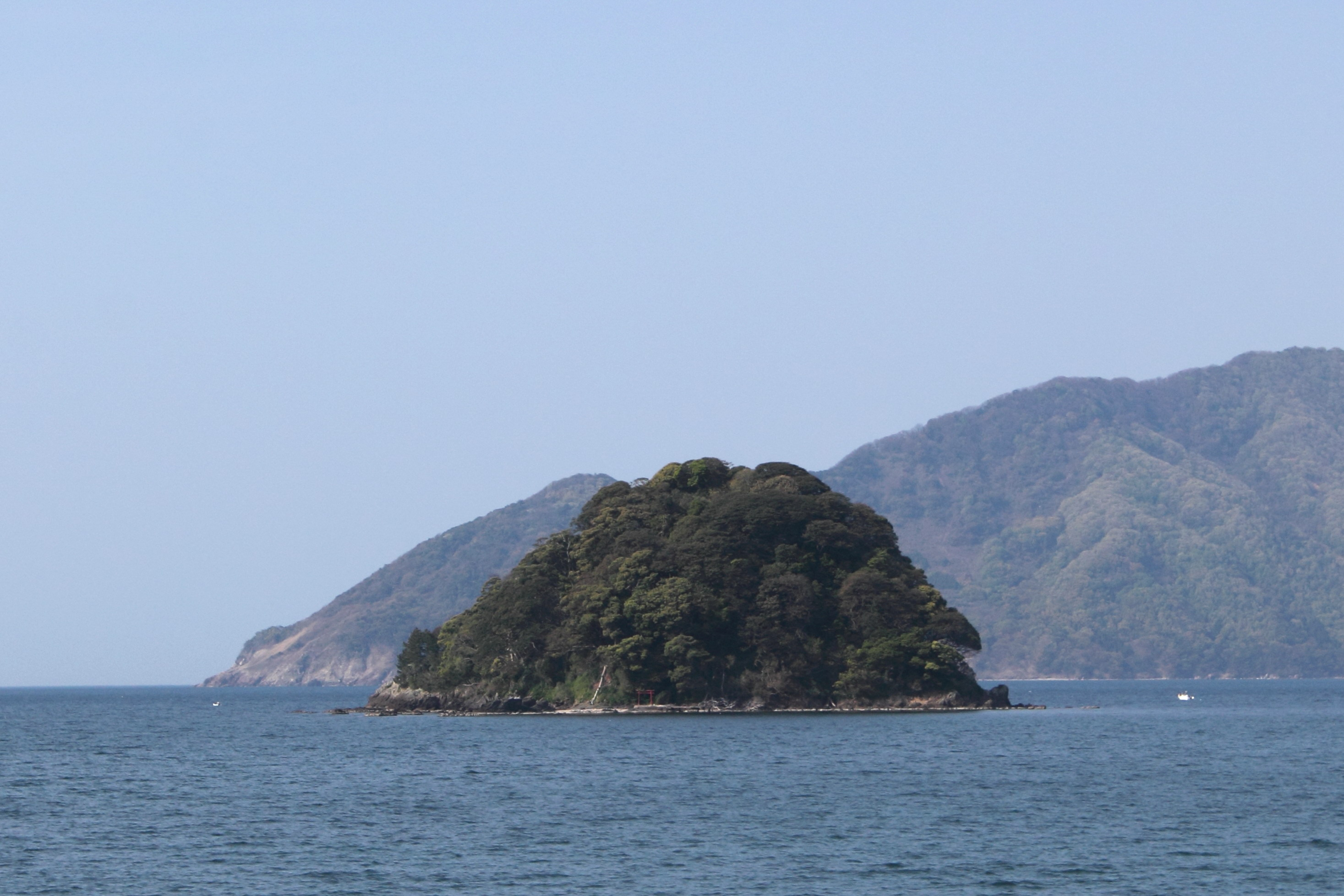
- Aoshima (island) in Obama Bay.

- Location within Japan
- Location: Fukui Prefecture, Japan
- Coordinates: 35°30′38.16″N 135°41′21.52″E
- Type: Bay
- Part of: Wakasa Bay; Sea of Japan
- River sources: Kita River; Minami River; Saburi River; Tada River
- Basin countries: Japan
- Surface area: 58.7 km^{2} (22.7 mi^{2})
- Average depth: 13 m (43 ft)
- Max. depth: 35 m (115 ft)
- Water volume: 0.74 cubic kilometres (0.18 mi^{3})
- Settlements: Ōi; Obama

Obama Bay (小浜湾, Obama-wan) is a bay within Wakasa Bay in the Chūbu region of Japan, within the municipal boundaries of both Ōi and Obama. Its surface area is about 58.7 square kilometres (22.7 mi^{2}), with a mean depth of 25 metres (82 ft). Due to its clear waters and large beaches, it is a popular beach destination in the summer.

== Geography ==
Obama Bay is bay within Wakasa Bay in the Chūbu region of Japan. Its mouth is bounded by Matsugazaki on the Uchitomi Peninsula on the east (part of Obama) and Ogasaki on the Ōshima Peninsula (part of Ōi) on the west. It covers an area of 58.7 square kilometres (22.7 mi^{2}). It has a volume of 0.74 cubic kilometres (0.18 mi^{3}), a maximum depth of 35 metres (115 ft), and a mean depth of 13 metres (43 ft). The bay has a ria coast, and part of the coastline borders Wakasa Wan Quasi-National Park.

The bay is a natural breakwater. Its water level is less affected by high tides, having a tidal range of less than 20 centimetres (7.9 in). The bay has a single Class A river, the Kita, feeding into it. Two Class B rivers, the Tada and Minami, also empty into the bay, forming a delta within Obama Bay. Another delta is formed by the Saburi River within Ōi near Wakasa-Hongō Station. Its watershed has an annual precipitation of over 2,000 millimetres (79 in), and discharge into the bay is highest during March-April and June-September. Its alluvial plain has over 100 active artesian wells.

Its waters are very clear and it has many beaches, so it is a popular summertime beach destination.

=== Border communities ===
Obama Bay is found within Fukui Prefecture, with the following municipalities bordering the bay:

- Ōi, Fukui
- Obama, Fukui

=== Major rivers ===
The following rivers discharge into Obama Bay:

- Kita River
- Minami River
- Saburi River
- Tada River

=== Major islands ===
Major islands found in Obama Bay include Ao Island and Kanja Island.

== Flora and fauna ==
Flora include various phytoplankton and benthic microalgae, including the following:

- Bacteriastrum hyalinum
- Ceratocorys horrida
- Chaetoceros:
  - C. curvisetus
  - C. didymus
  - C. lorenzianus
- Protoperidinium:
  - P. depressum (Peridinium depressum)
  - P. grande (Peridinium grande)
  - P. oceanicum var. oblongum (Peridinium oceanicum)
- Pseudo-nitzschia seriata
- Pyrocystis pseudonoctiluca (Pyrocystis noctiluca)
- Sargassum:
  - S. confusum
  - S. coreanum
  - S. gigantifolium
  - S. hemiphyllum
  - S. horneri
  - S. macrocarpum
  - S. micracanthum
  - S. miyabei
  - S. muticum
  - S. patens
  - S. piluliferum
  - S. ringgoldianum
  - S. sagamianum
  - S. serratifolium
  - S. siliquastrum
  - S. thunbergii
  - S. tortile
- Thalassionema nitzschioides
- Tripos:
  - T. candelabrum (Ceratium candelabrum)
  - T. fusus (Ceratium fusus)
  - T. mollis (Ceratium molle)
  - T. muelleri (Ceratium tripos)
  - T. pennatus (Ceratium pennatum)
  - T. ranipes (Ceratium palmatum var. ranipes)
  - T. sumatranus (Ceratium smatoranum)
  - T. trichoceros (Ceratium trichoceros)

Obama Bay contains a wide diversity of fauna:

- Acartia:
  - A. clausi
  - A. spinicauda
- Ascidiacea
- Apoprionospio dayi (Spionidae)
- Asian date mussel (musculus senhousia)
- Black seabream
- Corycaeus (Corycaeidae)
- Euterpina acutifrons (Euterpe acutifrons)
- Gammarids (various)
  - Ampelisca brevicornis (Ampeliscidae)
- Glycera chirori
- Hermit crab
- Holothuria
- Japanese sea bass
- Linopherus (Pseudeurythoe)
- Lumbrineris longifolia
- Magelona japonica
- Mediomastus
- Microsetella:
  - M. norvegica
  - M. rosea
- Nannocalanus minor (Calanus minor)
- Nephtys paradoxa
- Notomastus
- Oithona:
  - O. nana
  - O. plumifera
  - O. similis
- Oncaea:
  - O. media
  - O. venusta
- Paracalanus parvus
- Paraprionospio
- Polydora flava orientalis
- Prionospio ehlersi
- Spiophanes kroyeri (Spionidae)
- Tambalagamia fauveli (Nereididae)
- Terebellides stroemii
- Theora lubrica
- Timoclea micra (Veremolpa micra, part of Veneridae)
- Turban snail

== Works cited ==
- Hayashi, Isao (18 November 1982). "Distribution of Macrobenthic Animals on the Flat Bottom in Obama Bay". Bulletin of the Japanese Society of Scientific Fisheries. 49 (12). Japanese Society of Scientific Fisheries: 1765–1775. doi:10.2331/suisan.49.1765. Archived from the original on 27 April 2019.
- Kobayashi, Shiho; Sugimoto, Ryo; Honda, Hisami; Miyata, Yoji; Tahara, Daisuke; Tominaga, Osamu; Shoji, Jun; Yamada, Makoto; Nakada, Satoshi; Taniguchi, Makoto (24 March 2017). "High-resolution mapping and time-series measurements of ^{222}Rn concentrations and biogeochemical properties related to submarine groundwater discharge along the coast of Obama Bay, a semi-enclosed sea in Japan" (PDF). Progress in Earth and Planetary Science. 4 (6). Japan Geoscience Union. Bibcode:2017PEPS....4....6K. doi:10.1186/s40645-017-0124-y. ISSN 2197-4284. Archived (PDF) from the original on 10 January 2024.
