= Obama Castle (Wakasa Province) =

Seaside-style castle in Edo period Japan

Obama Castle 小浜城
- Obama, Fukui, Japan
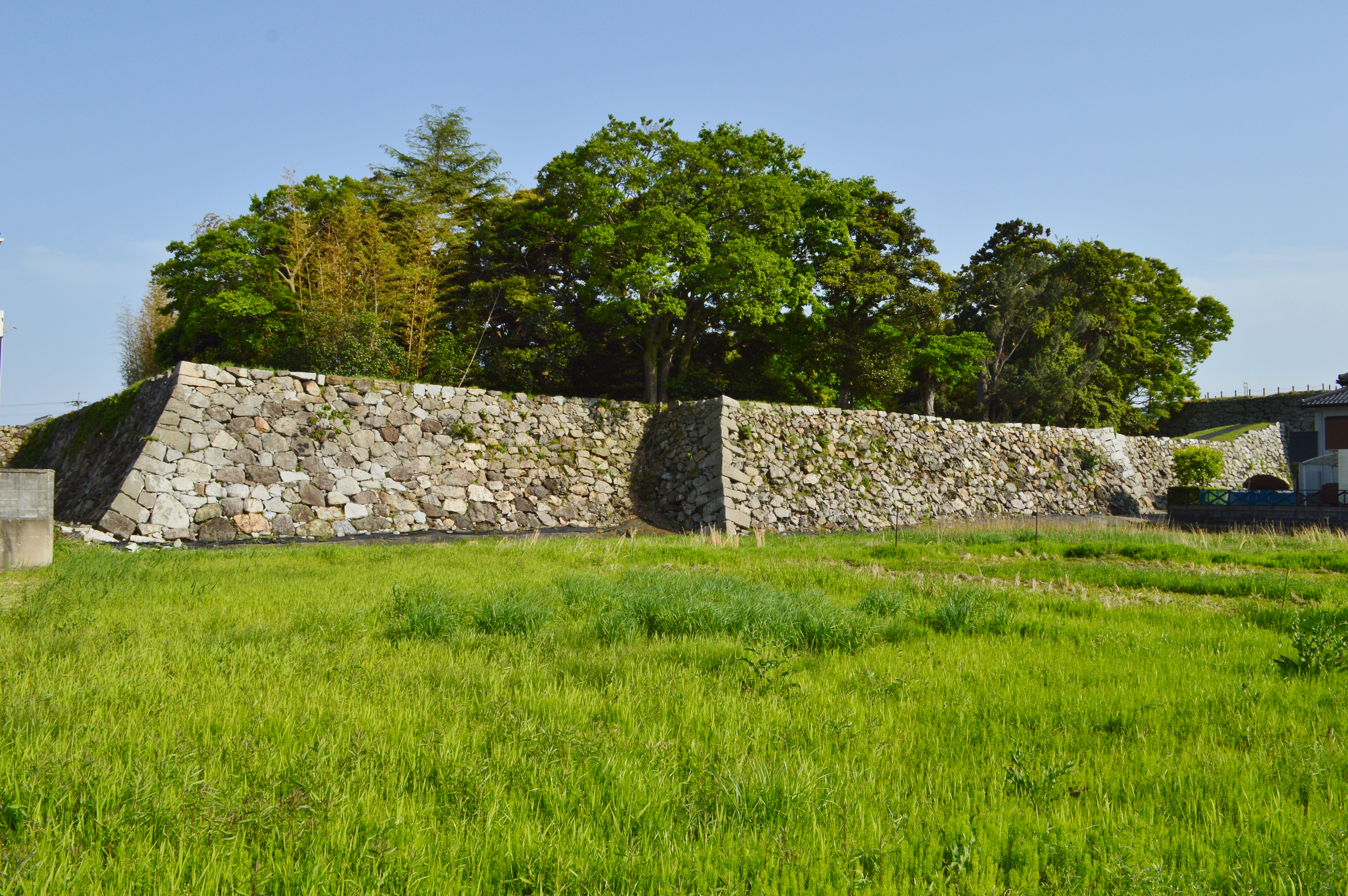
- Donjon foundation

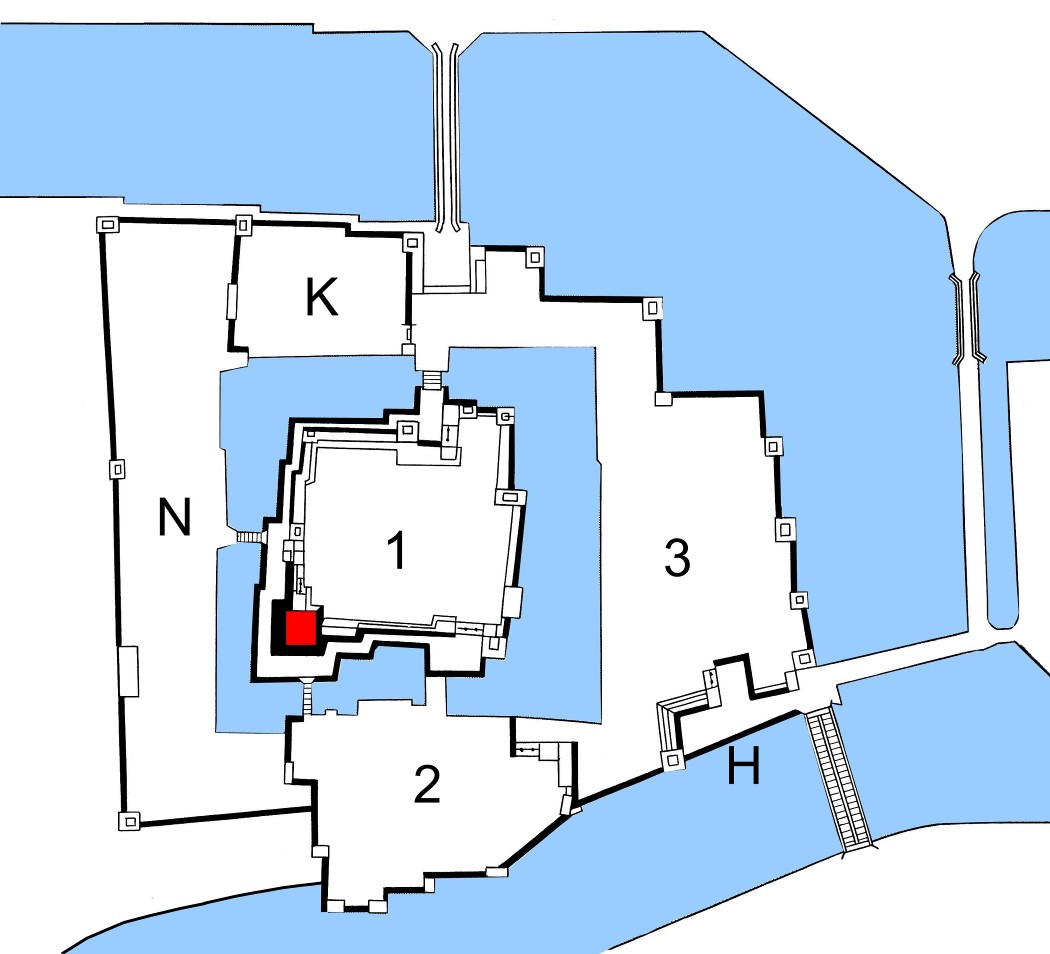
- Layout of Obama Castle - 1: main keep; 2: outer keep; 3: outermost keep; N: eastern keep; K: northern keep; H: main gate; Red: tower.

Site information
- Type: seaside-style Japanese castle
- Controlled by: Sakai clan

Location
- Coordinates: 35°30′14.3″N 135°44′45″E

Site history
- Built: 1641
- Built by: Sakai Tadakatsu
- In use: Edo period
- Materials: wood, stone
- Demolished: 1871

Obama Castle (小浜城, Obama-jō) was a seaside-style castle located in what is now the city of Obama, Fukui Prefecture, Japan. During the Edo period, it was the headquarters of a junior branch of the Sakai clan, who were hereditary daimyō of Obama Domain under the Tokugawa shogunate. The castle was also known by the name of Unpin Castle (雲浜城, Unpin-jō).

== History ==
Following the Battle of Sekigahara in 1601, the victorious Tokugawa Ieyasu awarded Wakasa Province to his general, Kyōgoku Takatsugu. At first, Takatsugu moved into Nochiseyama Castle, the ancestral seat of the Takeda clan, which was built on a mountain overlooking the city of Obama. However, he quickly decided to build a new castle on a river delta in Obama Bay, which would give him greater control of the jōkamachi and the strategic port. Construction was continued by his son Kyōgoku Tadataka from 1609; however, Tadataka was transferred to Izumo Province in 1634, before the castle was completed.

The Kyōgoku clan was replaced by Sakai Tadakatsu, an important retainer of the shogunate, who had served as Tairō under shōgun Tokugawa Iemitsu and Tokugawa Ietsuna. He modified the layout of the castle and completed it in 1641. The Sakai clan continued to rule from Obama Castle for fourteen generations over 237 years to the end of the Edo period. Most of the castle was destroyed by a fire in 1871 during the construction of an Imperial Japanese Army barracks, and although the donjon survived, it was scrapped in 1875. Much of the second bailey is now occupied by residential housing, and only a portion of the moats, strong ramparts and foundation of the donjon survive. A Shinto shrine, the Obama Jinja is now located near the site of the donjon. In 1956, the site of Obama Castle was designated a prefectural historic site.

== Layout ==
Obama Castle was built on the shores of the Sea of Japan, on a needle-like peninsula formed by the Kita, Tada, and Minami Rivers, which contribute greatly to its natural defences. At the southwestern edge of the inner bailey was a 29-meter three-story donjon modelled after the Fujimi Yagura at Edo Castle. The inner bailey was projected by a concentric outer bailey with 30 yagura watchtowers and by water moats.

== Gallery ==
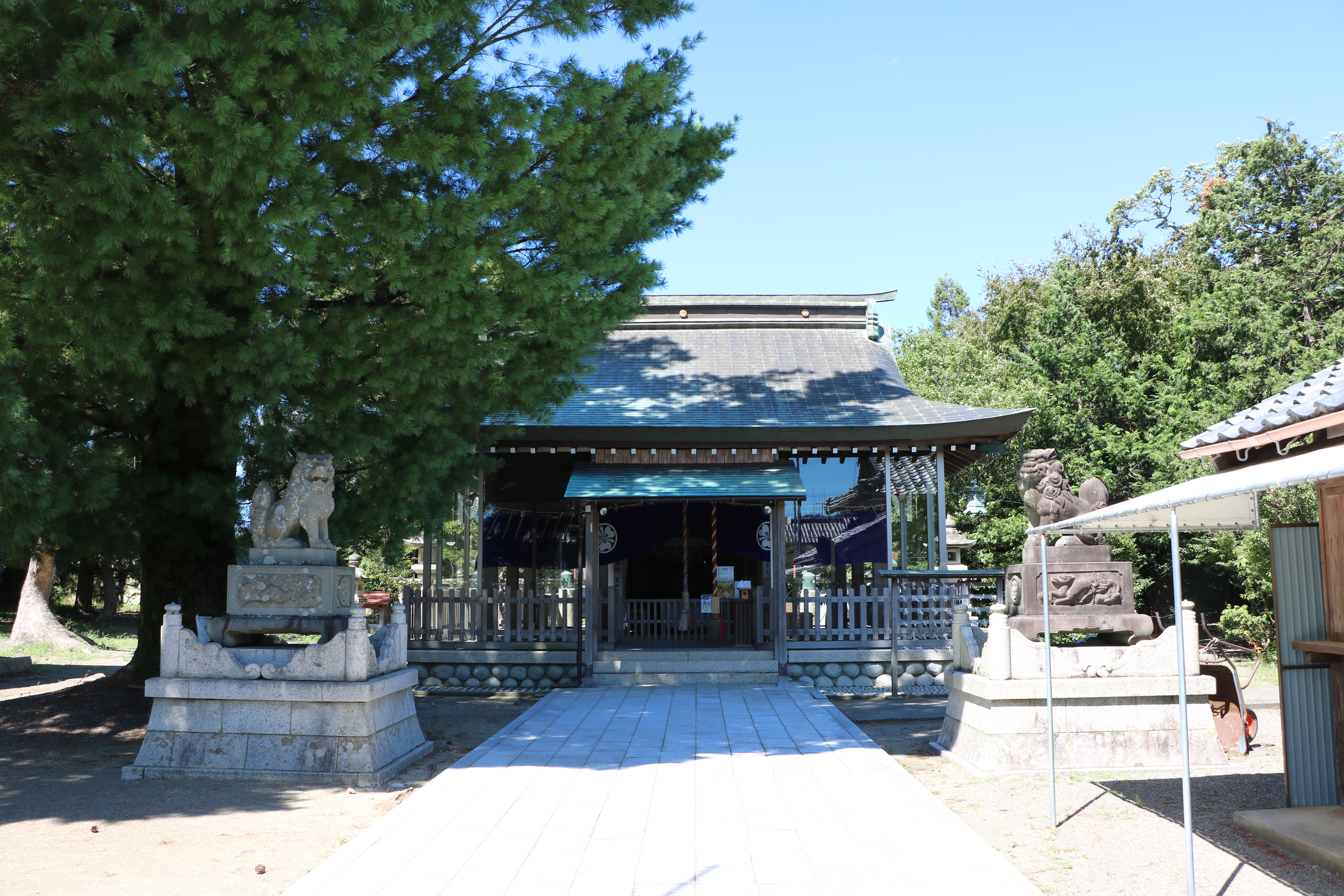
The Obama shrine hall near the ruined castle

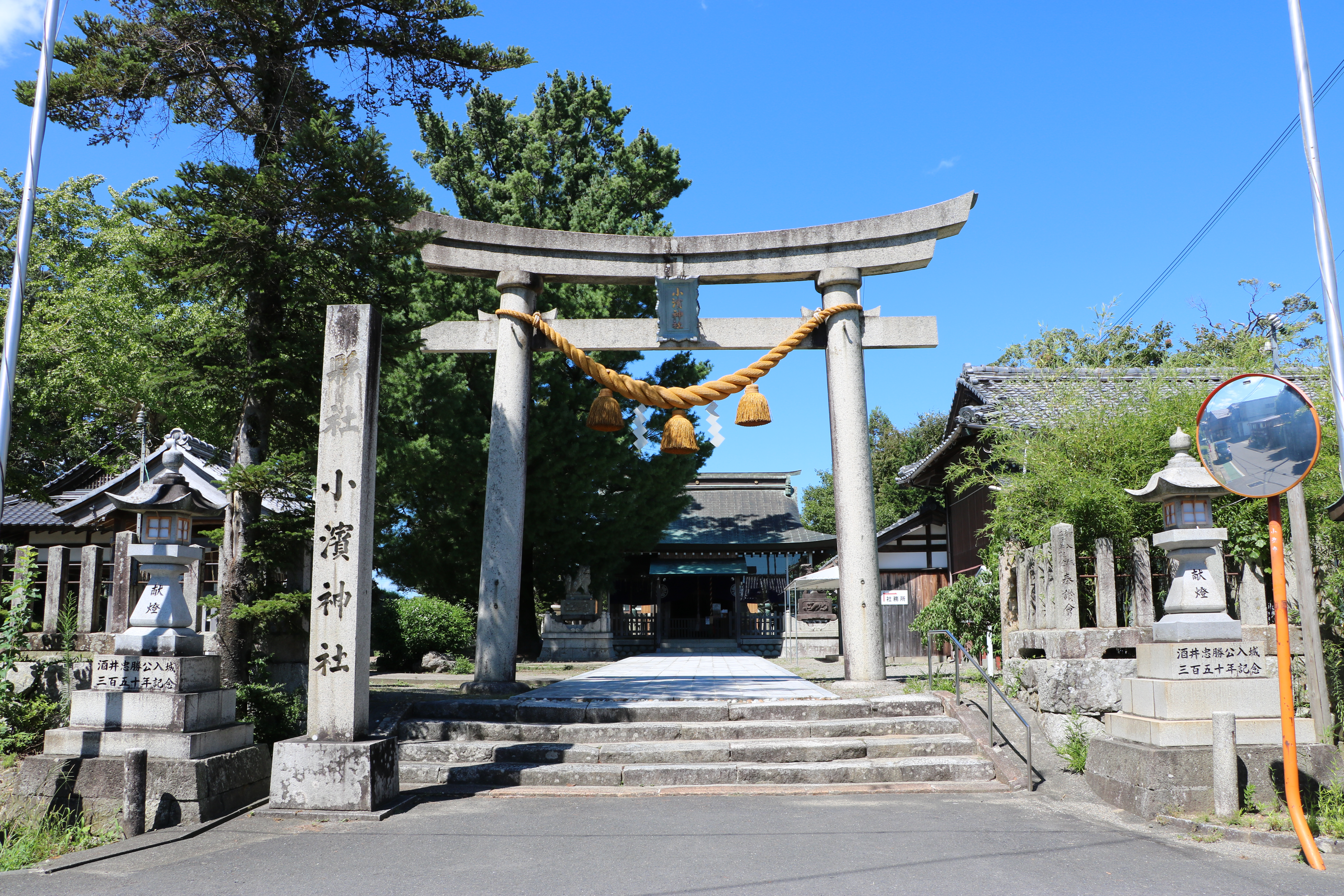
The Obama shrine torri near the ruined castle

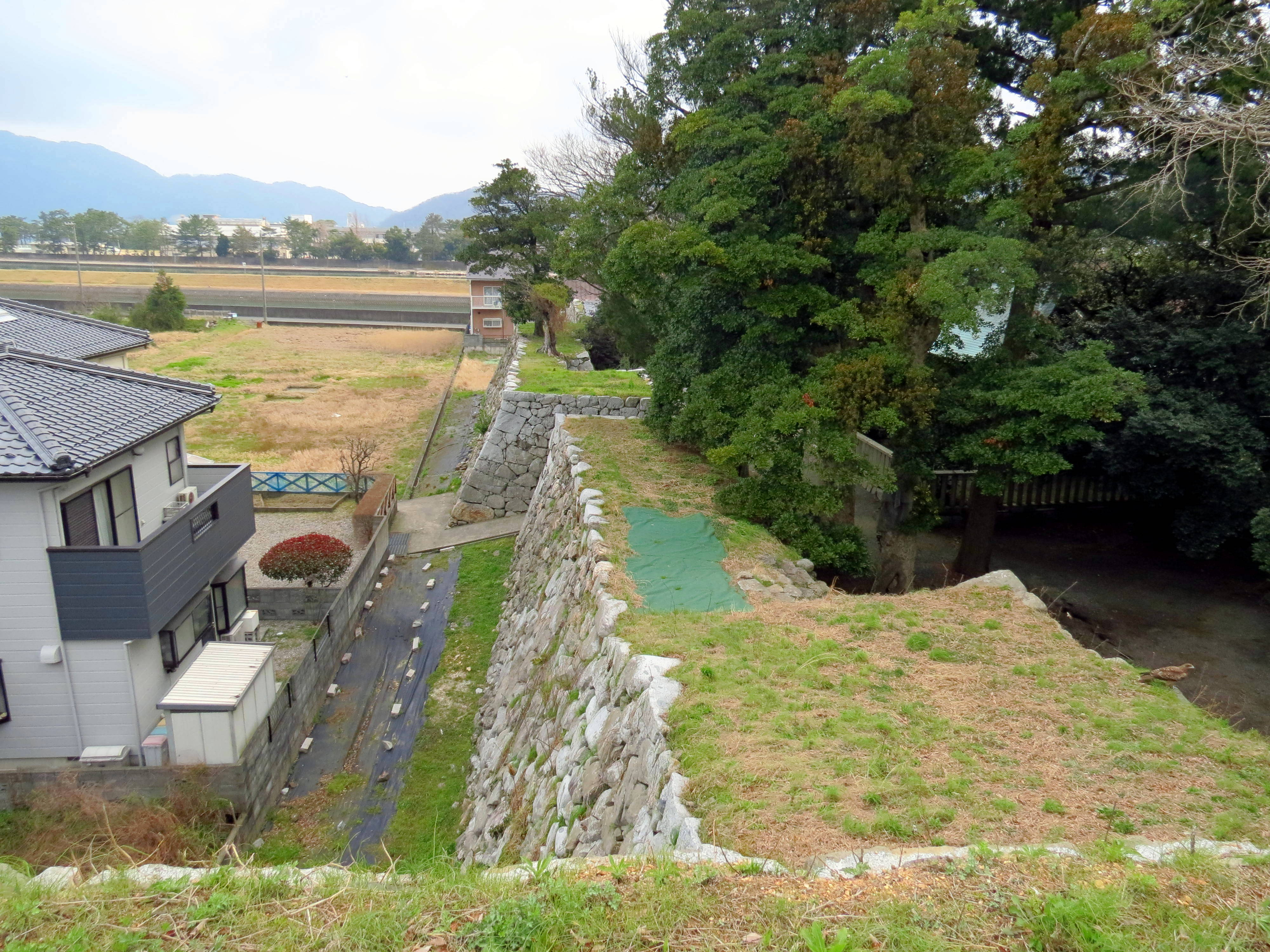
The Obama castle ruins

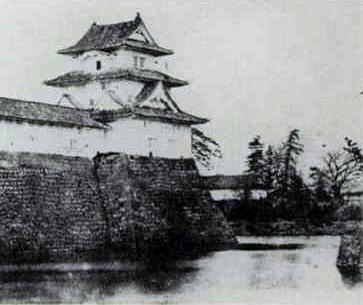
Obama Castle donjon, pre-1871

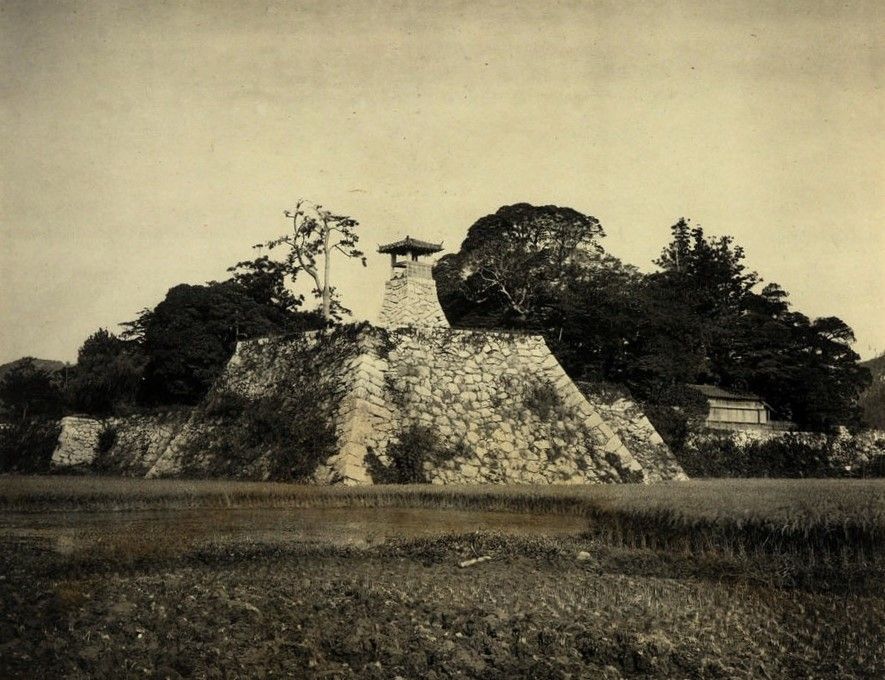
The Obama castle in 1910

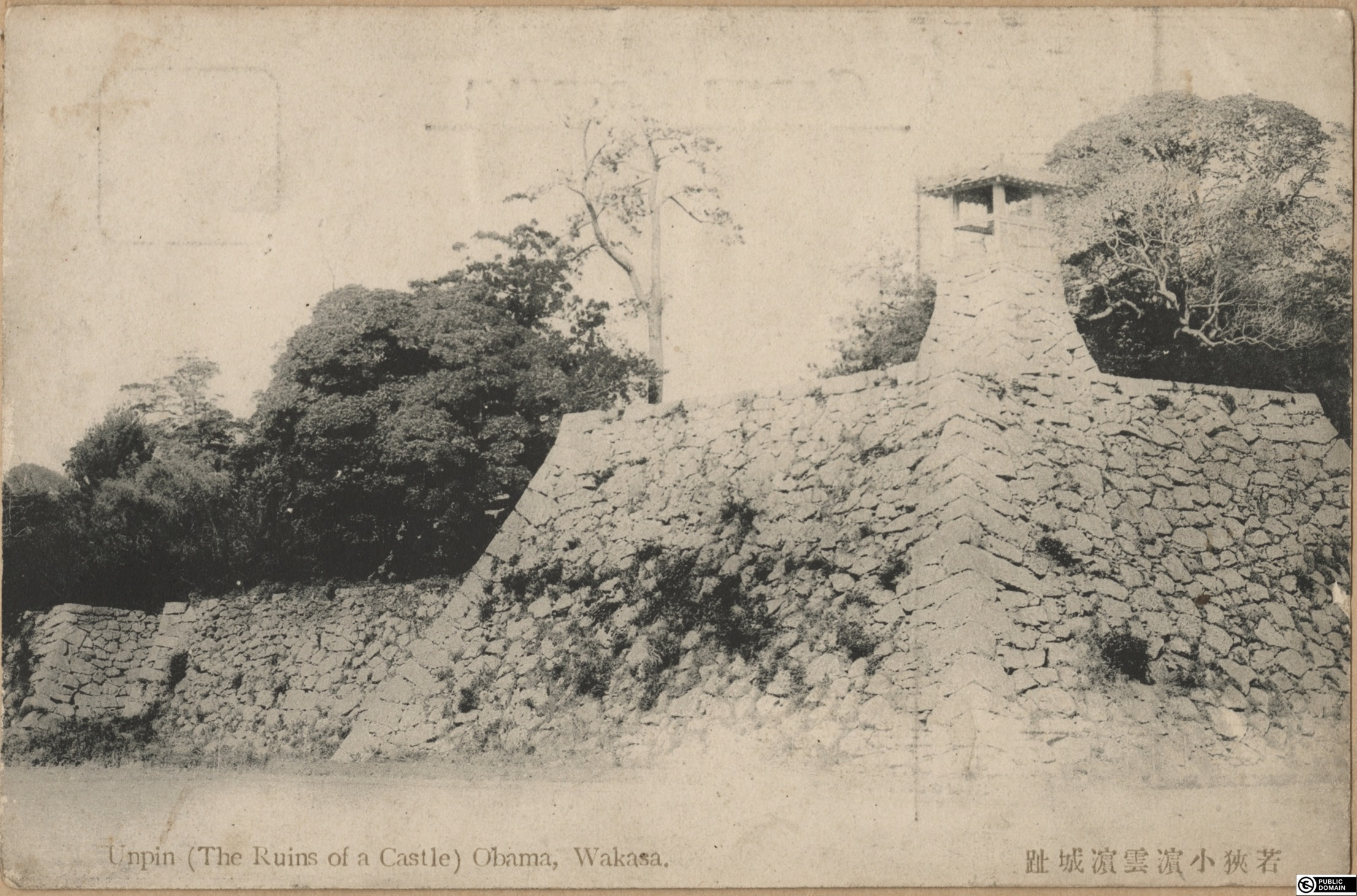
The Obama castle before the end of World War II
