= Japan National Route 161 =

Road in Japan

National Route 161
- 国道161号
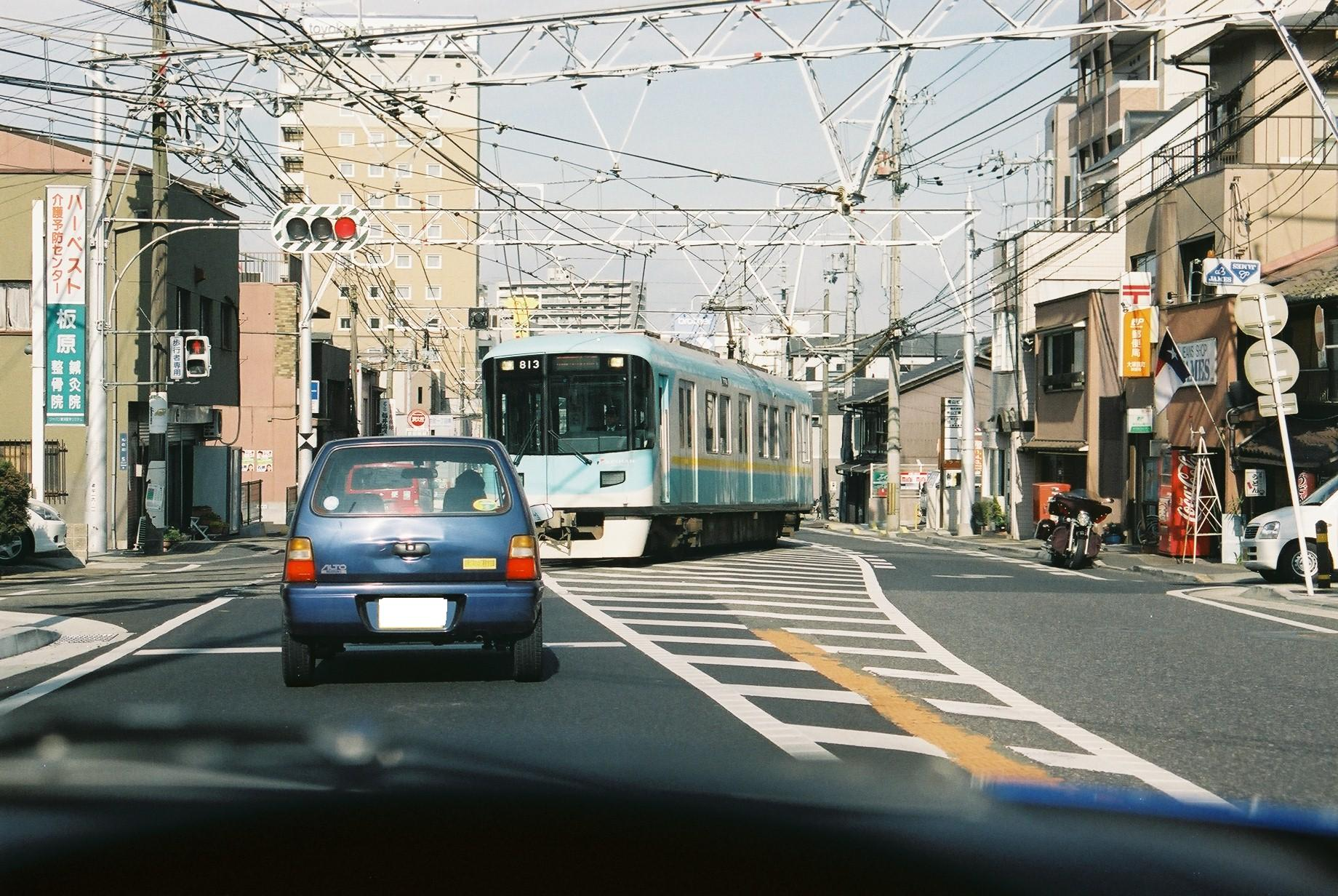

Route information
- Length: 86.4 km (53.7 mi)
- Existed: 18 May 1953–present

Major junctions
- North end: National Route 8 / National Route 162 in Tsuruga, Fukui
- South end: National Route 1 in Ōtsu

Location
- Country: Japan

Highway system
- National highways of Japan; Expressways of Japan
← National Route 160	→ National Route 162

National Route 161 is a national highway of Japan connecting Tsuruga, Fukui, and Ōtsu, Shiga, in Japan, with a total length of 86.4 km (53.7 mi).
