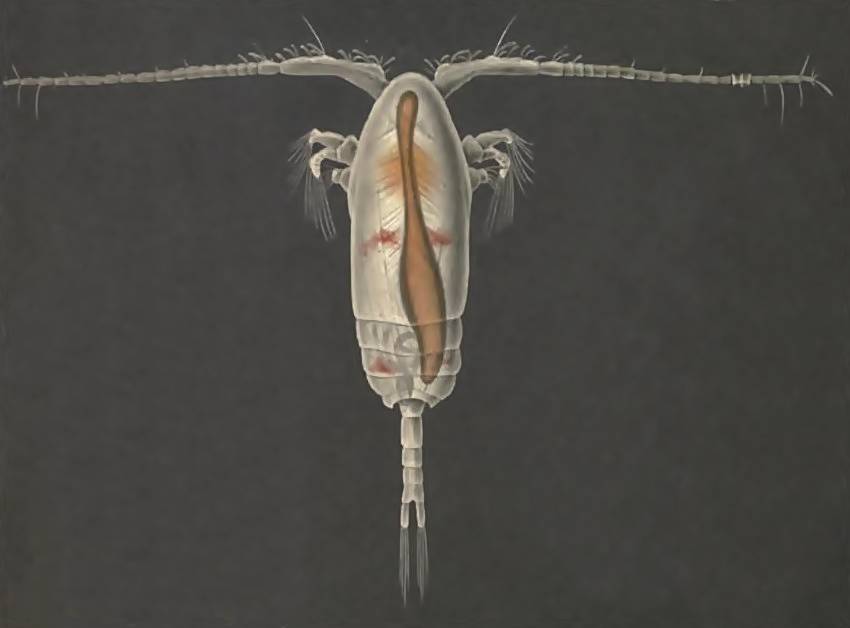

Scientific classification
- Domain: Eukaryota
- Kingdom: Animalia
- Phylum: Arthropoda
- Class: Copepoda
- Order: Calanoida
- Family: Paracalanidae
- Genus: Paracalanus
- Species: P. parvus

Binomial name
- Paracalanus parvus (Claus, 1863)

= Paracalanus parvus =

Species of crustacean

Paracalanus parvus is a copepod found throughout the world, except the Arctic.

== Description ==
The female P. parvus usually ranges from about 0.6 to 1.3 millimetres (0.024 to 0.051 in) in length, and the male is usually between about 0.5 and 1.4 millimetres (0.020 and 0.055 in) in length.

== Distribution ==
Paracalanus parvus is nearly cosmopolitan, found in waters throughout the world, with the exception of the Arctic.

== Ecology ==
=== Life cycle and reproduction ===
Paracalanus parvus breeds continuously, although its abundance and egg production rate vary seasonally, with it being abundant from April to December. Its egg production rate is positively correlated to temperature and concentrations of chlorophyll a.
