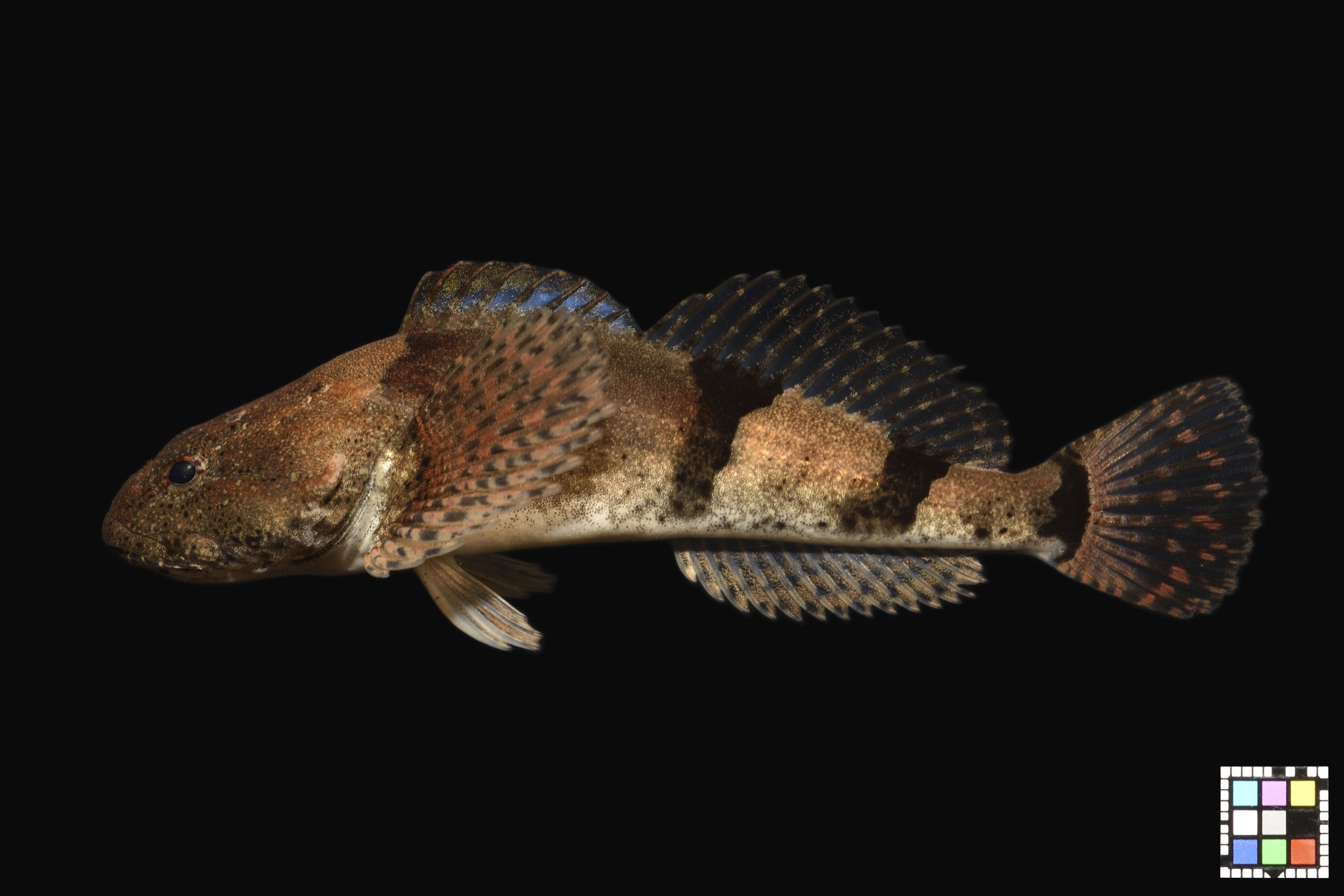

Conservation status
- Least Concern (IUCN 3.1)

Scientific classification
- Kingdom: Animalia
- Phylum: Chordata
- Class: Actinopterygii
- Order: Perciformes
- Suborder: Cottoidei
- Family: Cottidae
- Genus: Rheopresbe; Jordan & Starks, 1904
- Species: R. kazika

Binomial name
- Rheopresbe kazika (D. S. Jordan and Starks, 1904)

Synonyms
- Cottus kazika Jordan & Starks, 1904; Rheopresbe fujiyamae Jordan & Starks, 1904

= Fourspine sculpin =

Species of fish

The fourspine sculpin (Rheopresbe kazika) is a species of freshwater ray-finned fish belonging to the family Cottidae, the typical sculpins. It is the only member of the genus Rheopresbe. It is endemic to Japan. It reaches a maximum length of 30 cm (12 in).

== Taxonomy ==
The fourspine sculpin was first formally described in 1904 by the American ichthyologists David Starr Jordan and Edwin Chapin Starks with its type locality given as Niigata in Japan. This species is placed in the monospecific genus Rheopresbe by some authorities, as molecular analyses indicated that this species was a sister taxon to Trachidermus fasciatus, another catadromous Japanese sculpin. This taxonomy is followed by Eschmeyer's Catalog of Fishes. The specific name kazika is a Japanese word for river sculpins.
