= Japan National Route 162 =

National highway in Japan

National Route 162
- 国道162号
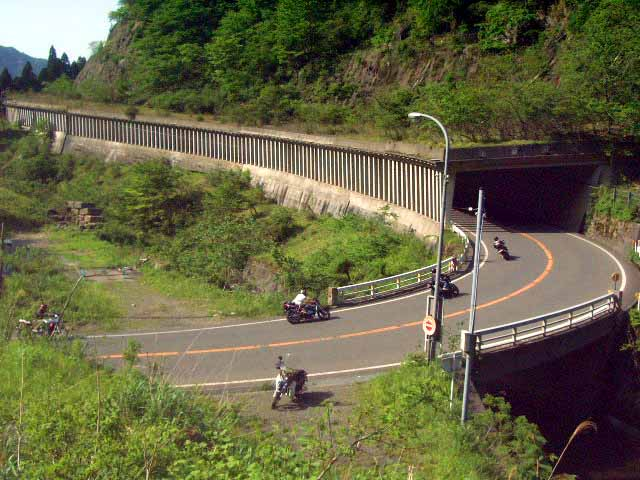

Route information
- Length: 148 km (92 mi)
- Existed: 18 May 1953–present

Major junctions
- North end: National Route 8 / National Route 161 in Tsuruga, Fukui
- South end: National Route 9 in Shimogyō-ku, Kyoto

Location
- Country: Japan

Highway system
- National highways of Japan; Expressways of Japan
← National Route 161	→ National Route 163

National Route 162 is a national highway of Japan connecting Shimogyō-ku, Kyoto and Tsuruga, Fukui in Japan, with a total length of 148 km (92 mi).

== History ==
Route 162 was designated on 18 May 1953 from Kyoto to Obama. On 1 April 1982, the road was extended to Tsuruga.
