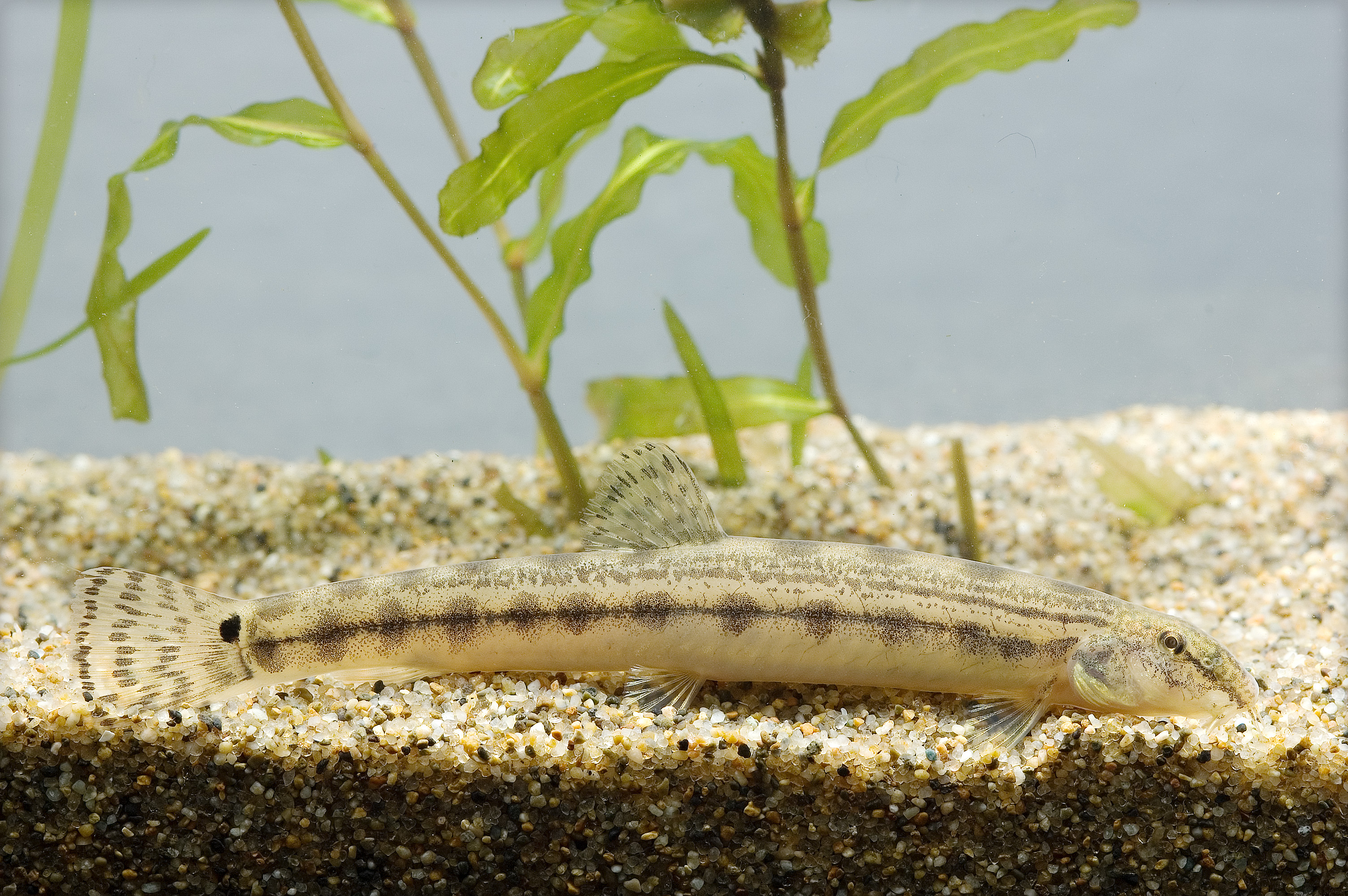

Scientific classification
- Kingdom: Animalia
- Phylum: Chordata
- Class: Actinopterygii
- Order: Cypriniformes
- Family: Cobitidae
- Genus: Cobitis
- Species: C. biwae

Binomial name
- Cobitis biwae Jordan & Snyder, 1901

= Cobitis biwae =

Species of fish

Cobitis biwae, or the Japanese striped loach, is a species of fish in the family cobitidae native to Japan. It is found in sandy and gravel substrate in rivers.

== Range ==
This species is native to Honshu. However, it is not found in Yamaguchi prefecture. It is considered invasive in Chuzenjiko Lake and Eastern Shizuoka prefecture.
