= Obama, Fukui =

Obama 小浜市
- City
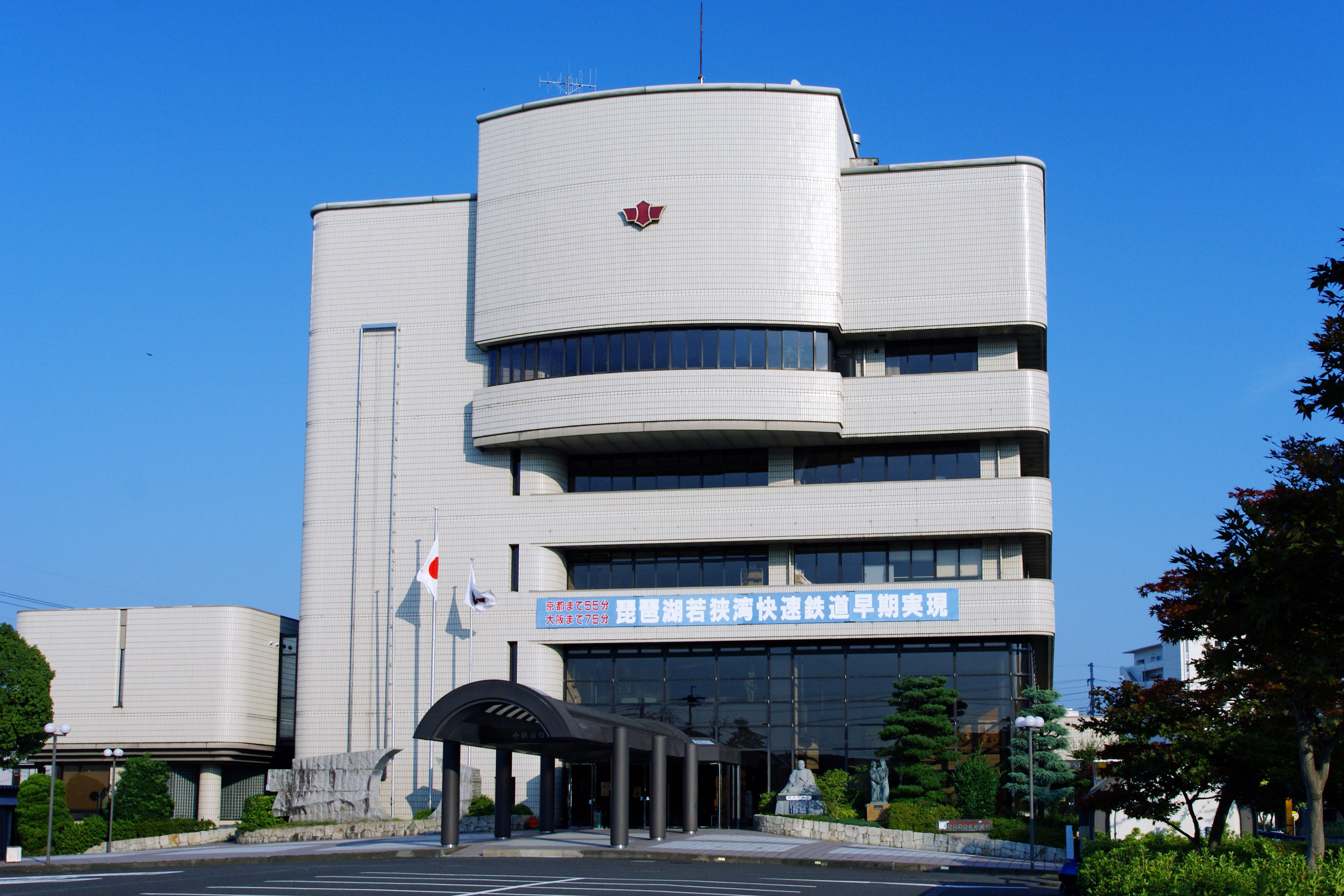
- Obama City Hall

- Flag Seal

- Location of Obama in Fukui Prefecture

- Coordinates: 35°29′44.4″N 135°44′47.8″E
- Country: Japan
- Region: Chūbu (Hokuriku)
- Prefecture: Fukui

Government
  - – Mayor: Kazunori Sugimoto

Area
  - Total: 233.09 km^{2} (90.00 sq mi)

Population (1 August 2018)
  - Total: 29,435
  - Density: 126.28/km^{2} (327.07/sq mi)
- Time zone: UTC+9 (Japan Standard Time)
- Phone number: 0770-53-1111
- Address: 6–3 Ote-machi, Obama-shi, Fukui-ken 917-8585
- Climate: Cfa
- Website: www1.city.obama.fukui.jp
- Symbols
- Flower: Azalea
- Mascot: Nana-chan
- Tree: Maple

Obama (小浜市, Obama-shi; Japanese pronunciation: [ò̞.bä́.mä́(.ɕì)]; lit. 'Small Beach') is a city located in Fukui Prefecture, Japan. As of 1 August 2018, the city had an estimated population of 29,435 in 12,057 households and a population density of 240 persons per km^{2} (327/sq mi). The total area of the city was 233.09 square kilometres (90 sq mi).

== Geography ==
Obama is located in far southwestern Fukui Prefecture, bordered by Shiga Prefecture to the south and the heavily indented ria coast of Obama Bay (within Wakasa Bay) on the Sea of Japan to the north. It is due north of Kyoto, and is about four to seven hours by train from Tokyo. Parts of the city are within the borders of the Wakasa Wan Quasi-National Park.

=== Neighbouring municipalities ===
- Fukui Prefecture
  - Ōi
  - Wakasa
- Shiga Prefecture
  - Takashima

=== Climate ===
Obama has a humid subtropical climate (Köppen Cfa) characterized by warm, wet summers and cold winters with heavy snowfall. The average annual temperature in Obama is 14.8 °C (58.6 °F). The average annual rainfall is 2,018.7 mm (79.48 in) with September as the wettest month. The temperatures are highest on average in August, at around 27.0 °C (80.6 °F), and lowest in January, at around 3.8 °C (38.8 °F).

Climate data for Obama (1991−2020 normals, extremes 1978−present)
Month	Jan	Feb	Mar	Apr	May	Jun	Jul	Aug	Sep	Oct	Nov	Dec	Year
Record high °C (°F)	18.5 (65.3)	21.6 (70.9)	26.6 (79.9)	30.9 (87.6)	34.0 (93.2)	37.5 (99.5)	38.9 (102.0)	39.1 (102.4)	38.0 (100.4)	31.4 (88.5)	26.6 (79.9)	21.8 (71.2)	39.1 (102.4)
Mean daily maximum °C (°F)	7.4 (45.3)	8.0 (46.4)	12.1 (53.8)	18.0 (64.4)	23.0 (73.4)	26.3 (79.3)	30.5 (86.9)	32.1 (89.8)	27.6 (81.7)	21.9 (71.4)	16.3 (61.3)	10.5 (50.9)	19.5 (67.1)
Daily mean °C (°F)	3.8 (38.8)	4.1 (39.4)	7.4 (45.3)	12.6 (54.7)	17.7 (63.9)	21.6 (70.9)	25.7 (78.3)	27.0 (80.6)	22.9 (73.2)	17.2 (63.0)	11.6 (52.9)	6.5 (43.7)	14.8 (58.7)
Mean daily minimum °C (°F)	0.4 (32.7)	0.4 (32.7)	2.8 (37.0)	7.5 (45.5)	12.8 (55.0)	17.6 (63.7)	22.1 (71.8)	23.0 (73.4)	19.1 (66.4)	12.8 (55.0)	7.1 (44.8)	2.6 (36.7)	10.7 (51.2)
Record low °C (°F)	−9.4 (15.1)	−10.1 (13.8)	−6.7 (19.9)	−1.5 (29.3)	3.9 (39.0)	6.3 (43.3)	13.6 (56.5)	14.0 (57.2)	8.5 (47.3)	2.7 (36.9)	−1.2 (29.8)	−7.8 (18.0)	−10.1 (13.8)
Average precipitation mm (inches)	217.6 (8.57)	156.6 (6.17)	135.4 (5.33)	108.4 (4.27)	137.9 (5.43)	137.8 (5.43)	180.7 (7.11)	157.1 (6.19)	234.4 (9.23)	179.9 (7.08)	160.0 (6.30)	222.6 (8.76)	2,018.7 (79.48)
Average snowfall cm (inches)	66 (26)	62 (24)	9 (3.5)	0 (0)	0 (0)	0 (0)	0 (0)	0 (0)	0 (0)	0 (0)	0 (0)	20 (7.9)	157 (62)
Average precipitation days (≥ 1.0 mm)	21.0	17.6	15.1	12.3	11.2	11.6	12.8	9.8	12.8	12.0	14.6	19.5	170.3
Average snowy days (≥ 3 cm)	6.8	6.2	1.1	0	0	0	0	0	0	0	0	2.0	16.1
Mean monthly sunshine hours	64.1	77.4	124.7	169.3	196.8	141.2	162.6	205.2	140.6	136.9	104.3	81.5	1,613.4
Source: Japan Meteorological Agency

== Demographics ==
Per Japanese census data, the population of Obama has been on gradual decline since its peak population of ~38,500 in the late 1960s and early 1970s.

Historical population
Year	Pop.	±%
1940	38,554	—
1950	36,236	−6.0%
1960	33,702	−7.0%
1970	38,138	+13.2%
1980	34,049	−10.7%
1990	33,774	−0.8%
2000	33,295	−1.4%
2010	31,340	−5.9%
2020	28,991	−7.5%

== History ==
Obama developed as a seaport with connections to the Asian continent even before the start of written history in Japan, and artefacts from China have been found in local tombs from the Kofun period. From the Asuka period and Nara period, salt and seafood from the Obama area were supplied to the imperial dynasty, and under the Ritsuryō system, Obama was the capital of Wakasa Province. Many temples and cultural remains from the Nara and Heian period are found in the Obama area, and the city labels itself "Nara by the sea" in its tourist promotions. As a result of its location in the Wakasa Province area, which travelers passed through when traveling between China and Kyoto, the area was influenced by Chinese culture for a long period. There are many buildings and houses in the Sancho-machi area of the city whose design was influenced by trade with China.

Obama is one of the locations where Japanese citizens were abducted by North Korean agents on 7 July 1978.

The economy of Obama is mixed, with agriculture and commercial fishing playing important roles. Seasonal tourism is of growing importance. Wakasa lacquered chopsticks, agate accessories, and other crafts are made in the area.

Fukui Prefectural University has a branch campus located in Obama since 1992. In this short period, the university's Research Center for Marine Bioresources has been noted for its research of preservation and in the fields of fish embryogenesis, aquaculture stock enhancement, fish disease, and microalgeal bloom. The university also has schools (faculties) of Economics, Nursing, Arts and Sciences, Biotechnology, and others.

== Transportation ==
=== Railway ===
- JR West – Obama Line
  - Shin-Hirano, Higashi-Obama, Obama, Seihama, Kato

=== Highway ===
- Maizuru-Wakasa Expressway
- National Route 27
- National Route 162

== International relations ==
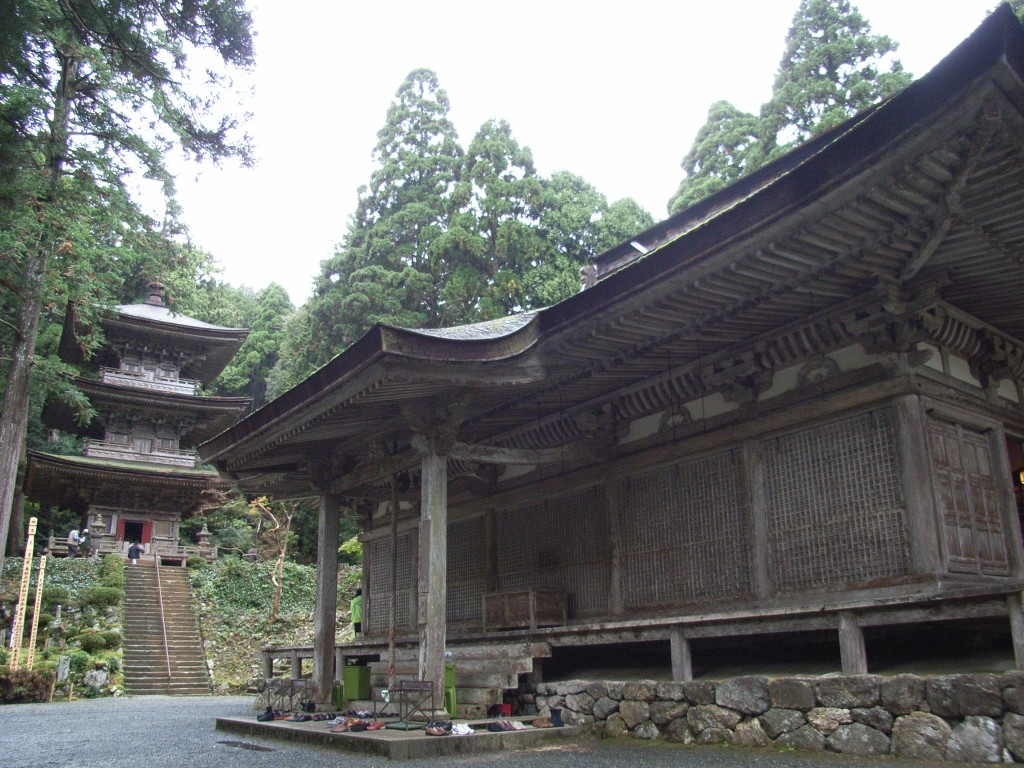
Myotsu-ji Temple

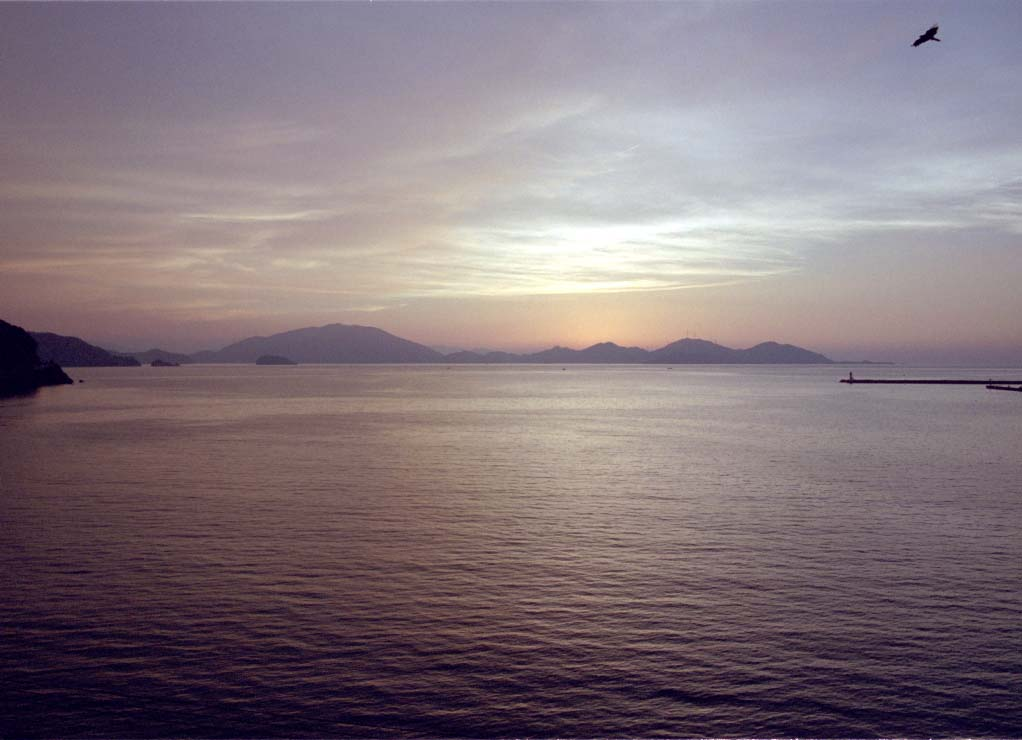
Obama Bay

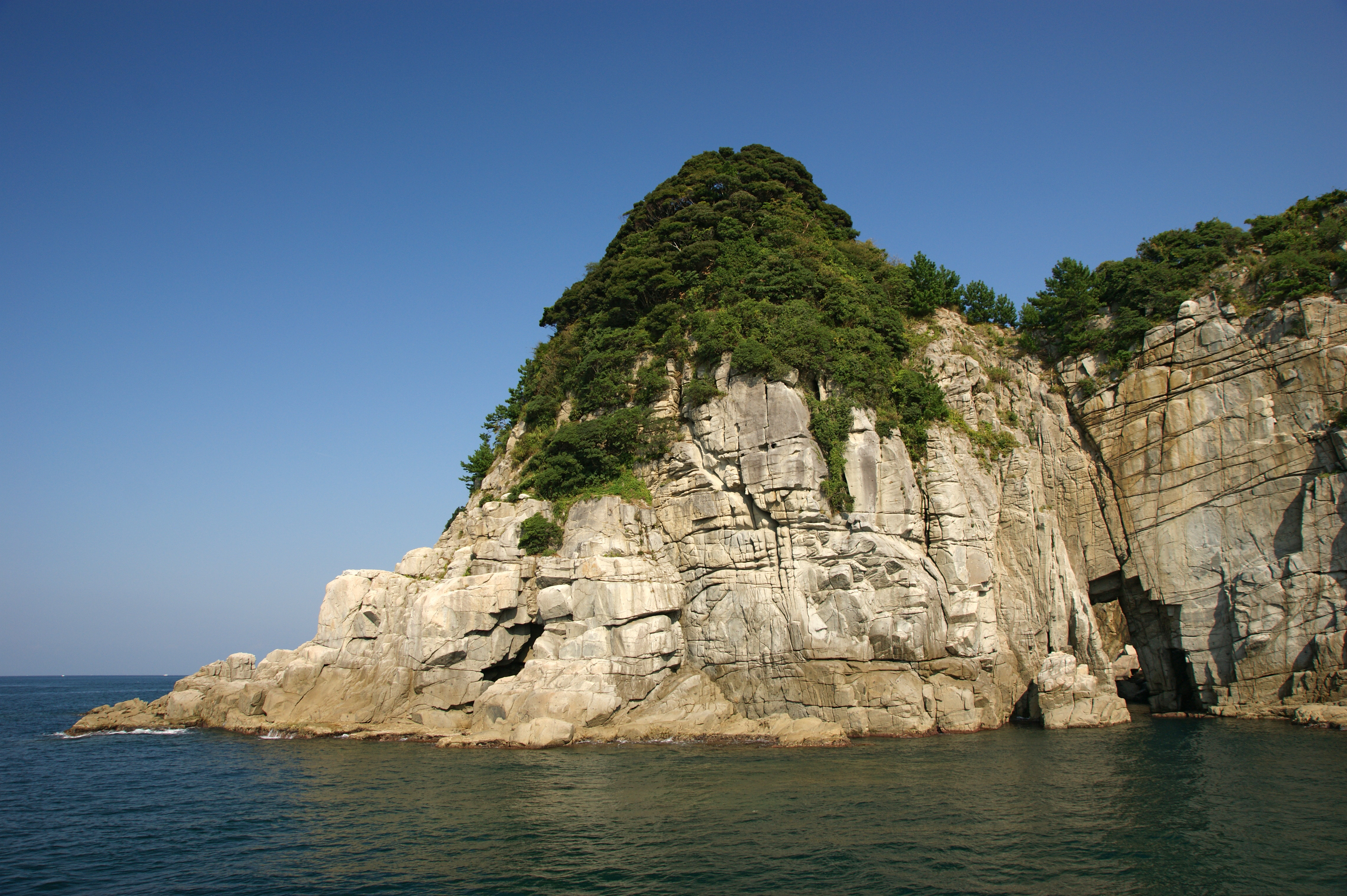
Sotomo coast

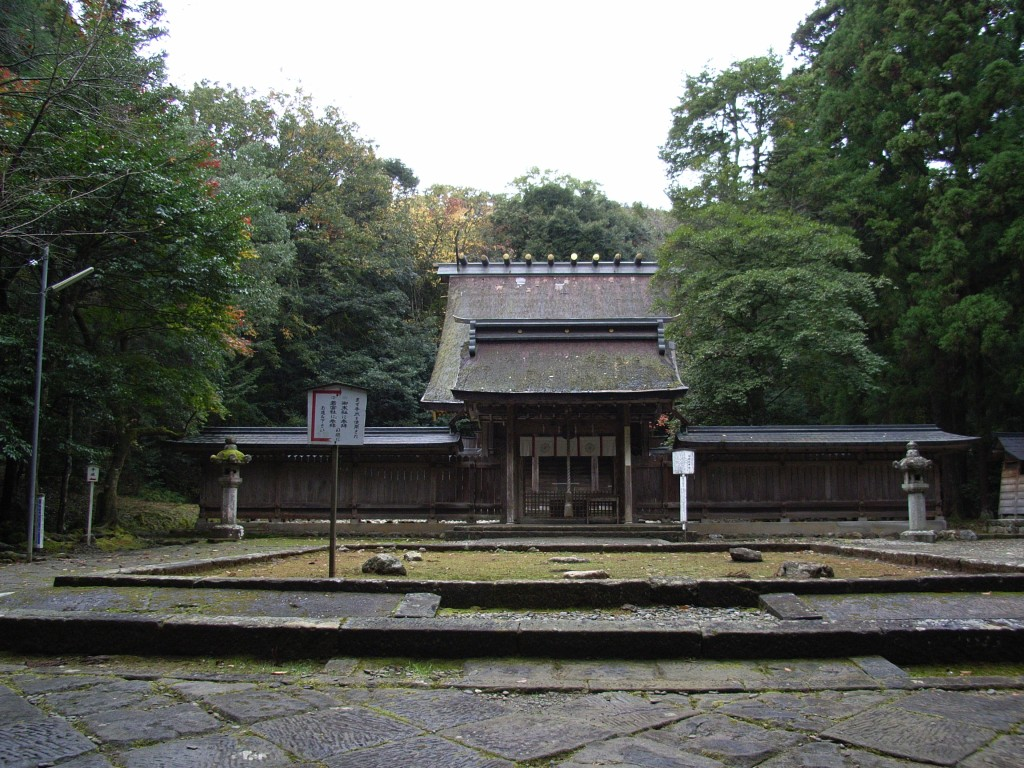
Wakasa-Hiko-jinja

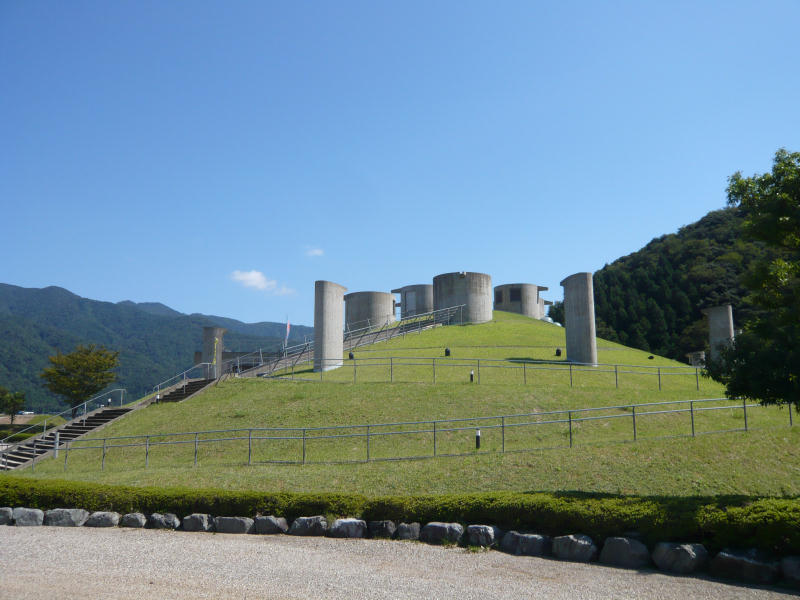
The Wakasa Historical and Folk Museum

=== Sister cities ===
- Kawagoe, Saitama, Japan
- Nara, Nara, Japan
- Gyeongju, Gyeongsangbuk-do, South Korea

=== Friendship cities ===
- Fujinomiya, Shizuoka, Japan
- Pinghu, Zhejiang, China
- Xi'an, Shaanxi, China

=== Relationship with Barack Obama ===
The city of Obama has received much publicity because it shares its name with former U.S. President Barack Obama. In 2006, Obama, as a senator, gave an interview to Japanese television network TBS in which he noted that, when passing through customs in Narita Airport, the official who inspected his visa said that he was from Obama. The Obama City Hall heard about the interview, and Mayor Toshio Murakami, sent Senator Obama a set of the city's famous lacquer chopsticks, a DVD about the city, and a letter wishing him the best. As Obama's presidential campaign progressed, more local businesses began to organize primary parties and put up "Go Obama!" posters, sell "I love Obama" T-shirts, and produce manjū (a type of Japanese confectionery) with Obama's face on them. A hula group began in the town in honor of Obama's home state of Hawaii. The troupe visited Honolulu in June to perform at the Pan Pacific Festival.

Obama has since thanked the town for their gifts and support, saying: "I look forward to a future marked by the continued friendship of our two great nations and a shared commitment to a better, freer world".

There are a number of Japanese people with the surname "Obama". Though the former American president is of Kenyan Luo heritage, it is not uncommon for Japanese and East African names to sound alike.

As a result of Obama's victory in the 2008 presidential election, the mayor of Obama City announced to the Japanese press that he intended to commission a statue of him, to be put in front of the city hall "as a token of the great historical moment for the name Obama". On 20 January 2009, the day that Barack Obama was sworn into office, the city of Obama celebrated the inauguration with women dancing the hula at the Hagaji Temple.

On 14 November 2009, President Obama specifically acknowledged his connection with Obama by mentioning it and its citizens in a speech at Suntory Hall in Tokyo. In 2013, Obama mayor Koji Matsuzaki gave a red lacquer pen to Japanese Prime Minister Shinzo Abe to give to President Obama.

== Local attractions ==
Street between old plastered and wooden houses, Obama

- Bukkokuji, a working Zen monastery
- Hosshinji, a working Zen monastery
- Mantoku-ji, Buddhist temple with Japanese garden designed a National Place of Scenic Beauty
- Myōtsū-ji
- site of Nochiseyama Castle, a National Historic Site
- site of Obama Castle
- Wakasa Historical and Folk Museum
- Wakasa Kokubun-ji, provincial temple of Wakasa Province
- Wakasa Wan Quasi-National Park
- Wakasahiko Shrine, ichinomiya of Wakasa Province

== Festivals ==
- Omizu-okuri (Water Carrying) Festival is held every 2 March on which water is drawn from the Onyu River and presented to the principal image of the temple. This annual event dates back more than 1,200 years.
