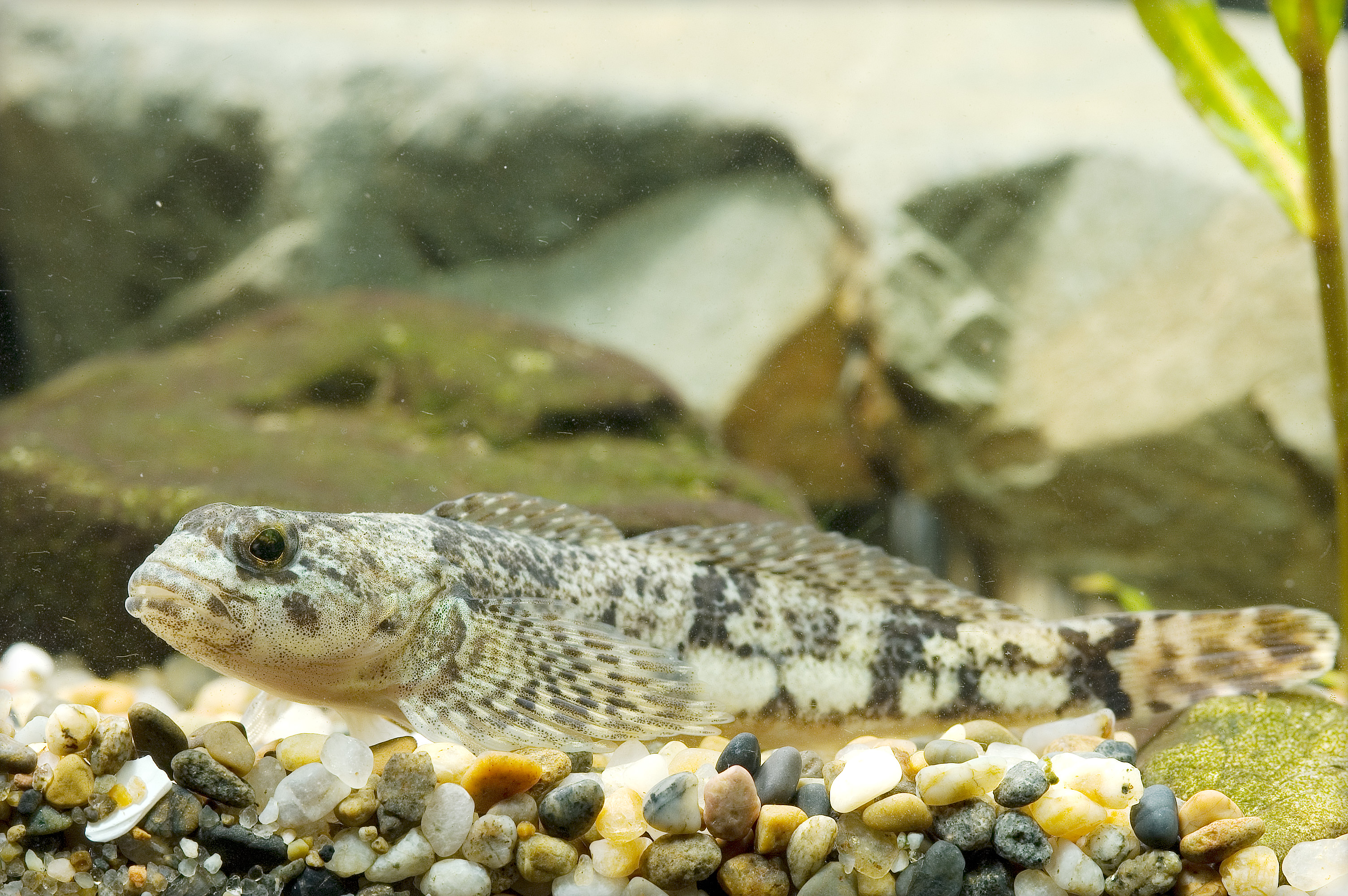

Conservation status
- Least Concern (IUCN 3.1)

Scientific classification
- Kingdom: Animalia
- Phylum: Chordata
- Class: Actinopterygii
- Order: Perciformes
- Suborder: Cottoidei
- Family: Cottidae
- Genus: Cottus
- Species: C. pollux

Binomial name
- Cottus pollux Günther, 1873

= Japanese fluvial sculpin =

Species of fish

The Japanese fluvial sculpin (Cottus pollux) is a species of freshwater ray-finned fish belonging to the family Cottidae, the typical sculpins. It is endemic to Japan, where it inhabits mountain streams in Honshu, Shikoku, and Kyushu. It reaches a maximum length of 15.0 cm (5.9 in). It is also known as the Japanese bullhead.
