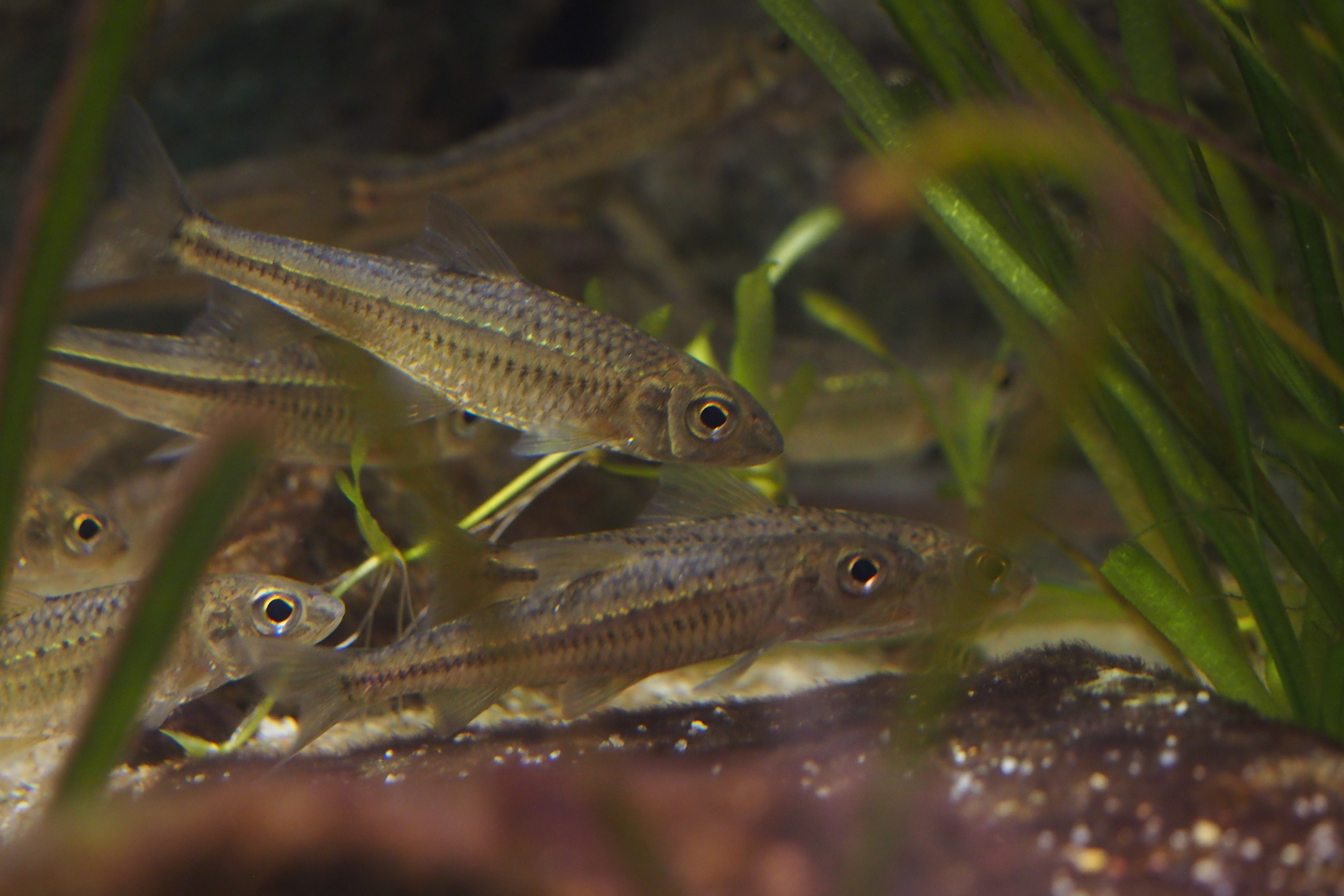
- Squalidus gracilis gracilis

Conservation status
- Least Concern (IUCN 3.1)

Scientific classification
- Kingdom: Animalia
- Phylum: Chordata
- Class: Actinopterygii
- Order: Cypriniformes
- Suborder: Cyprinoidei
- Family: Gobionidae
- Genus: Squalidus
- Species: S. gracilis

Binomial name
- Squalidus gracilis (Temminck & Schlegel, 1846)

Synonyms
- Capoeta gracilis Temminck & Schlegel, 1846; Gnathopogon gracilis (Temminck & Schlegel, 1846); Barbus homozonus Günther, 1868; Gnathopogon ishikawae D. S. Jordan & W. F. Thompson, 1914; Gnathopogon longifilis D. S. Jordan & Hubbs, 1925; Gnathopogon majimae D. S. Jordan & Hubbs, 1925; Gnathopogon tsuchigae D. S. Jordan & Hubbs, 1925; Squalidus gracilis minkiangensis Bănărescu & Nalbant, 1964

= Squalidus gracilis =

Species of fish

Squalidus gracilis is a species of freshwater ray-finned fish belonging to the family Gobionidae, the gudgeons. This species is found in Japan and the Korean peninsula.
