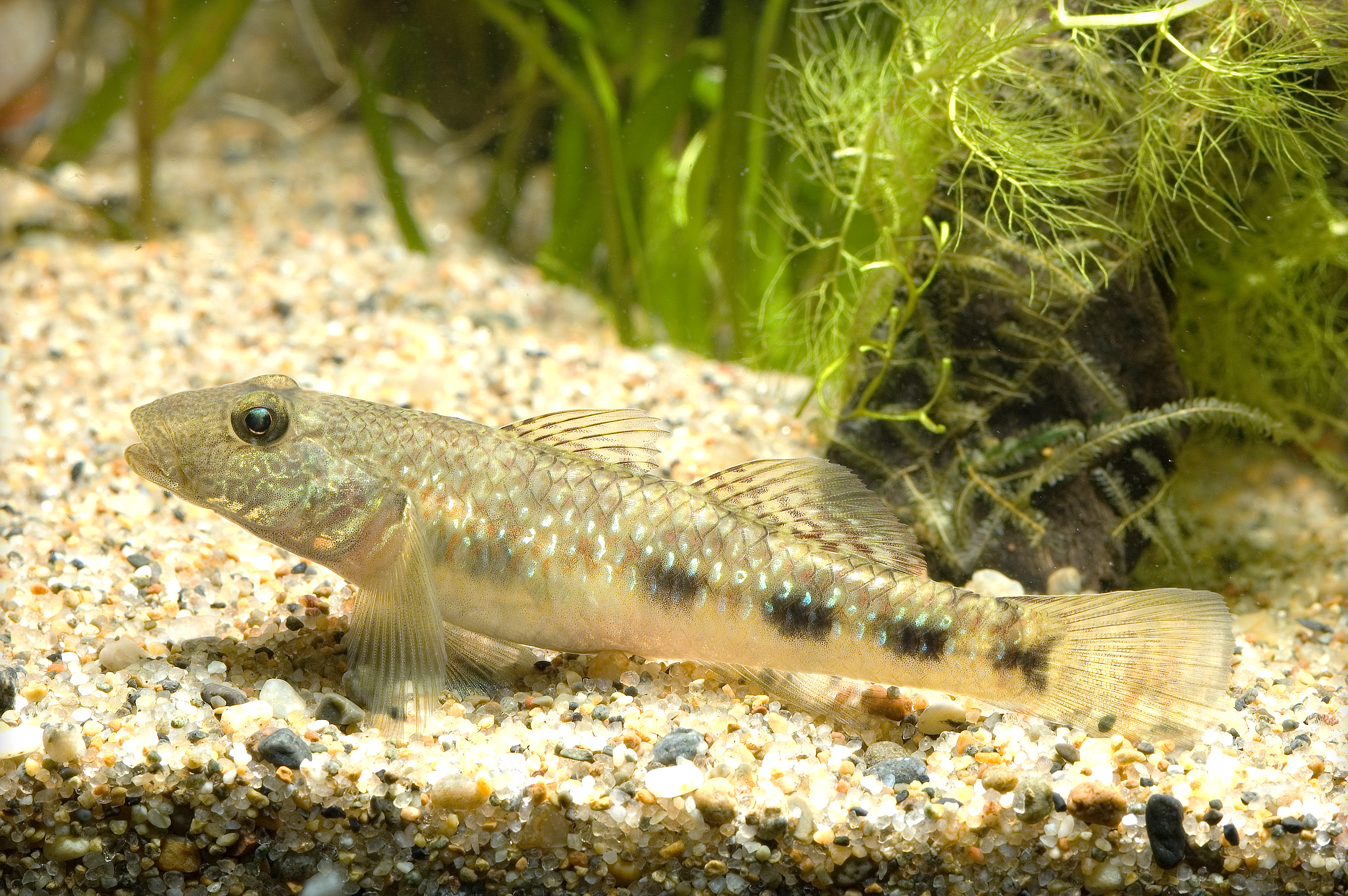
- Rhinogobius giurinus, from Hamamatsu, Shizuoka, Japan

Conservation status
- Least Concern (IUCN 3.1)

Scientific classification
- Kingdom: Animalia
- Phylum: Chordata
- Class: Actinopterygii
- Division: Teleostei
- Order: Gobiiformes
- Family: Oxudercidae
- Genus: Rhinogobius
- Species: R. giurinus

Binomial name
- Rhinogobius giurinus (Rutter, 1897)

Synonyms
- Gobius giurinus Rutter, 1897; Ctenegobius giurinus (Rutter, 1897); Ctenogobius giurinus (Rutter, 1897); Ctenogobius hadropterus D. S. Jordan & Snyder, 1901; Rhinogobius hadropterus (D. S. Jordan & Snyder, 1901)

= Rhinogobius giurinus =

Species of fish

Rhinogobius giurinus is a species of goby native to eastern Asia where it inhabits marine, brackish and fresh waters of rivers and estuaries. This species can reach a length of 8 centimetres (3.1 in) TL. It is of importance to local peoples as a food fish.

== Distribution ==
The fish's native range includes the Yellow River, Yangtze River, Qiantang River, Lingjiang, Pearl River, Fujian, Guangdong and Hainan regions (except the northwestern part of China including Tibetan Plateau and Yunnan–Guizhou Plateau), Taiwan, Hong Kong, the Korean Peninsula, from Tone River to Iriomote in Ibaraki Prefecture, Kawahara Lake in Nagasaki Prefecture in Japan, Bonin Islands, Ryukyu Islands and North Vietnam.

The species is also introduced into Singapore, Tibetan Plateau and Yunnan.

== Habitat ==
Its habitats include rivers, reservoirs, ponds and estuaries. Though it is a migratory fish, it can survive and reproduce in a completely closed drainage system.

== Diet ==
The fish feeds on aquatic insects, invertebrates, small fish, zooplankton, phytoplankton and plant detritus.
