= Wakasa Bay =

Bay in Chūbu, Japan

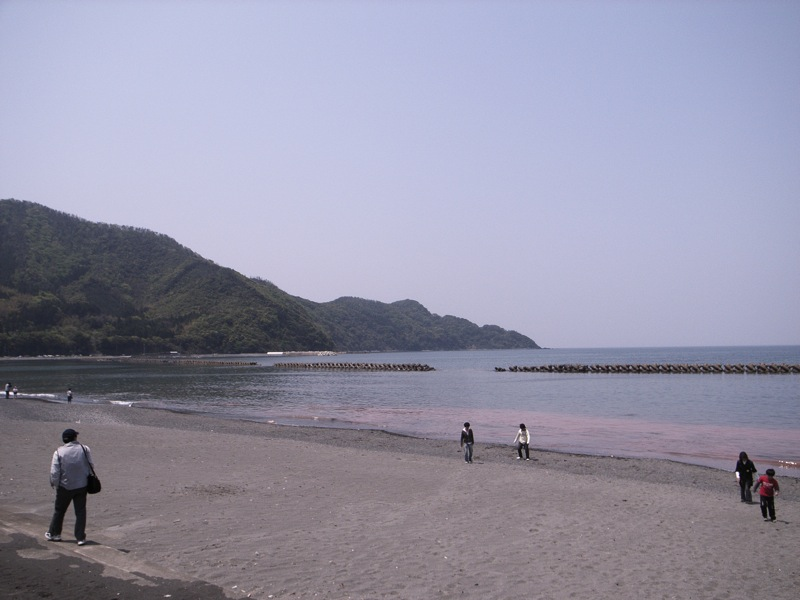
- Wakasa Bay from a beach in Fukui Prefecture

- Location within Japan
- Coordinates: 35°43′17.1″N 135°39′36.6″E
- River sources: Yura, Shono, Saburi
- Ocean/sea sources: Sea of Japan
- Basin countries: Japan
- Surface area: 2,657 square kilometres (1,026 sq mi)
- Settlements: Tsuruga, Obama, Maizuru, Miyazu, Kyōtango

Location on Wakasa Bay

Wakasa Bay (若狭湾, Wakasa-wan) is a bay located in the Chūbu region of Japan, and spans the coasts of Kyoto Prefecture, and Fukui Prefecture.

== Geography ==
Headland and bay on Wakasa Bay in a winter snowstorm, Mihama

Wakasa Bay is the area south of the straight line from Cape Kyoga on the west of Tango Peninsula to Cape Echizen on the east Echizen town. This area covers about 2,657 square kilometres (1,026 sq mi). Obama Bay is a sub-bay of Wakasa Bay.

=== Border communities ===
Fukui prefecture
Echizen town, Minamiechizen, Tsuruga, Mihama, Wakasa, Obama, Ōi, Takahama
Kyoto prefecture
Maizuru, Miyazu, Yosano, Ine, Kyōtango

=== Rivers ===
Yura, Shono, Saburi, etc.

== Development ==
=== Ports ===
Some of the most important ports on Japan's western coast are located in Wakasa Bay, these are the Ports of Tsuruga and Kyoto Maizuru Port.

=== Military facilities ===
The Port of Maizuru contains the naval bases of the Japan Maritime Self-Defense Force.
