= Funazushi =

Dish of fermented stuffed crucian carp

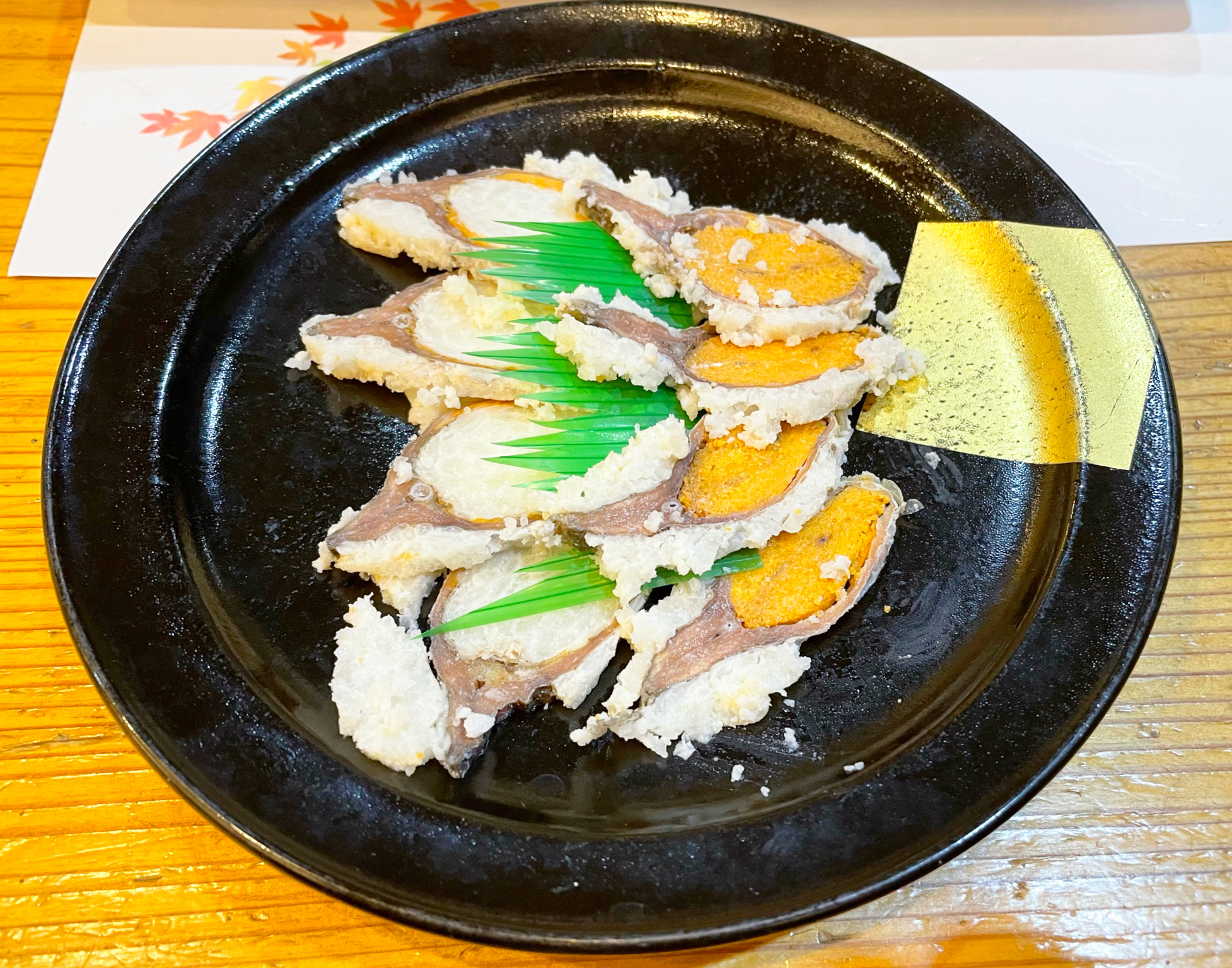
Funazushi cut into bite-sized pieces and served on a dish, Maibara, Shiga. What appears white is lactic acid fermented rice. The orange color is the egg.

Funazushi is a type of nare-zushi, an ancient Japanese type of sushi. It is a local dish of Shiga Prefecture (formerly Ōmi Province), where it has been made since ancient times using Lake Biwa's nigorobuna (Carassius auratus grandoculis) and other fish as the main ingredients.

== Overview ==
Funazushi is a type of nare-zushi. Nare-zushi is a food made by salting raw fish for several months, removing the salt, and then mixing it with cooked rice and fermenting it with lactic acid bacteria. Generally, the rice used for fermentation is discarded and only the fish is eaten. Modern sushi is made with rice mixed with vinegar, but this has been around since the 17th century; until then, the word sushi meant nare-zushi.

Many literature claim that nare-zushi originated from a fish storage method found in the mountainous region of Yunnan in Southeast Asia, but there are also different theories.

Today, crucian carp with the ovaries is generally used for funazushi. However, until the 19th century, the ovaries were often absent. The egg part smells similar to cheese.

Often cut into thin slices before eating. Often eaten as a snack with sake. It is sometimes made into chazuke.

In 1998, it was selected as one of Shiga Prefecture's Intangible Folk Cultural Assets as food.

Nigorobuna (Carassius auratus grandoculis) is used to make funazushi. The lactic acid softens the bones so that the fish can be eaten down to the bones. Until the Edo period, many documents stated that gengorobuna (Carassius cuvieri) was used as the raw material, but it is now believed that these were actually nigorobuna.

Funazushi was eaten as a substitute for medicine in the past because it contains lactobacillus, which helps to improve intestinal health.

In recent years, due to the deterioration of the spawning environment in Lake Biwa and feeding damage by invasive fishes, the number of nigorobuna has decreased, and the number of households making funazushi is decreasing.

== Method of manufacture ==
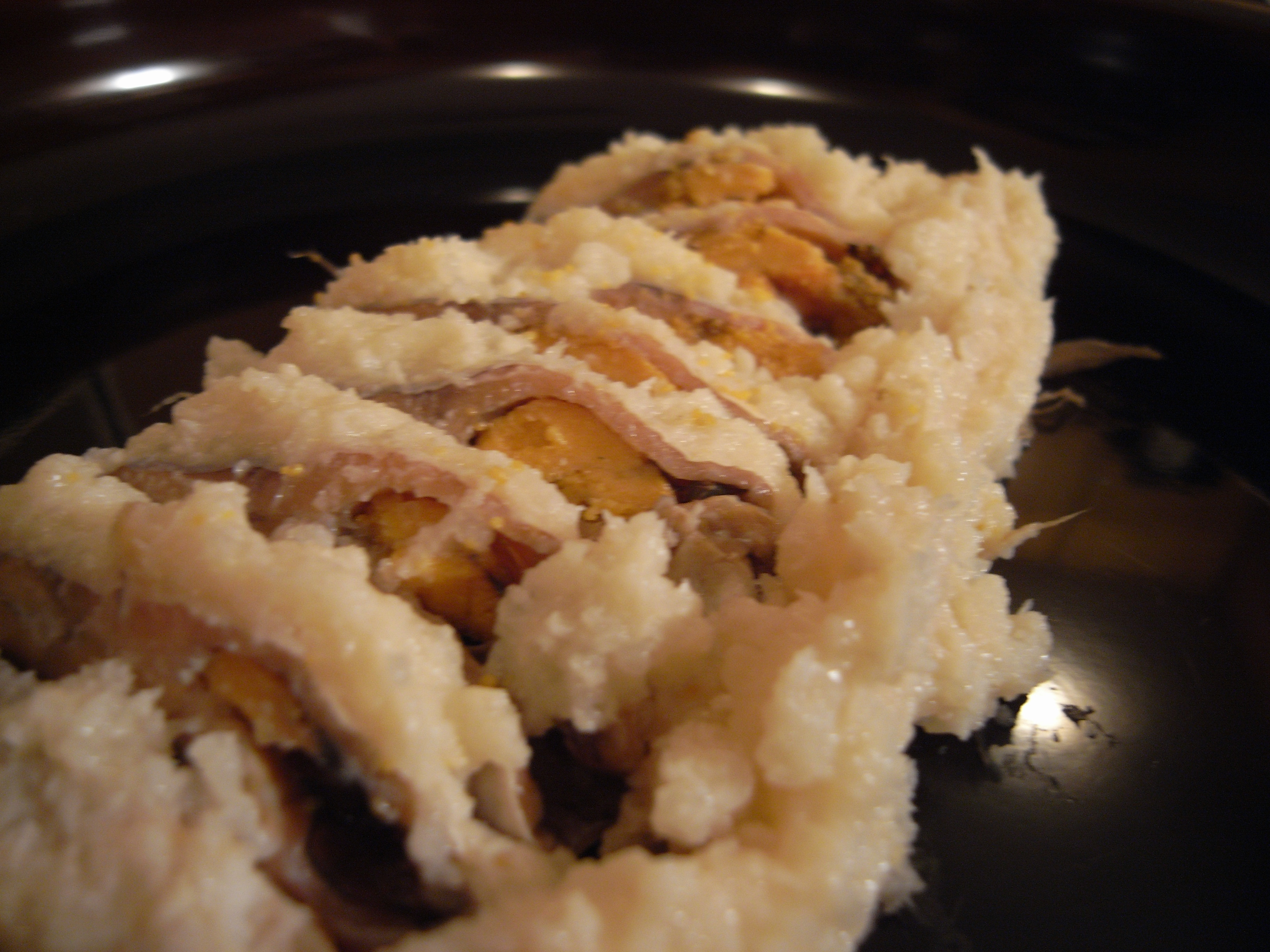
Funazushi made in Shiga Prefecture

Funazushi is a specialty of Shiga Prefecture and is believed to be the oldest form of nare-zushi existing in Japan.

Generally, nigorobuna with eggs are used as a raw material, but gengorobuna are also used.

Its manufacturing process varies from vendor to vendor and home to home.

In most modern times, the fish is salted in early spring. That is, after the scales, gills, and internal organs except for the ovaries of the raw fish are removed, the belly cavity is stuffed with salt and stored in layers in wooden vats until summer.

In summer, the fishes are rinsed for desalt, dried, and placed in a wooden bucket on a bed of cooked rice. On top of that, more rice is spread, and fishes are placed again. After several layers, a drop-lid is placed on top, and a weight is placed on the lid. After this, it is stored for several months until winter to ferment.

It is believed that the flavor and shelf life of funazushi is mainly imparted during this rice pickling process. The process of salting in the preliminary stage is also thought to inhibit the growth of spoilage bacteria, inhibit the progress of autolysis, and dehydrate, harden, and bleed the meat.

Funazushi is a fermented food that uses the action of lactic acid bacteria and yeast.

Air deprivation is important for lactic acid fermentation, and water has been used to cover the top of the drop-lid. Currently, a plastic bag is placed over the bucket, the bag is filled with fishes and rice, the mouth of the bag is closed, and a drop-lid and weight are placed on the bag to keep out air without water.

To make it with 1 kg per fish, one barrel contains 40 to 50 fish, 27 kg of rice and 15 kg of salt.

In Shiga Prefecture, in addition to funazushi made from nigorobuna, nare-zushi is also made from freshwater fish such as ugui, hasu, moroko, Ayu Biwa trout, koi, and dojo. Nare-zushi has been designated as Shiga's food cultural asset in Shiga Prefecture's Intangible Folk Cultural Assets in 1998.。

The decline of nigorobuna, the fish used to make funazushi, has become a problem, and Shiga Prefecture is working to release young fish into Lake Biwa and to conserve the reed community along the lake's shores.

== Biochemistry ==
Funazushi contains organic acids such as lactic acid, formic acid, acetic acid, propionic acid, and butyric acid. These organic acids lower the pH, which also imparts preservative properties.

== History ==
=== Ancient China ===
The character zha "鮓," meaning "sour fish," appears in the Shuowen Jiezi in the 2nd century. However, this book does not describe the production method, so it is unclear if it was fermented with rice like funazushi.

The Shiming, written in southern China in the 3rd century, describes fermenting fish mixed with salt and rice, indicating that the basic process was already developed at this time. However, as discussed below, there is a theory that Japanese sushi was rediscovered by Japan on its own.

=== Ancient Japan ===
The relationship between the ancient Chinese zha 鮓 and the Japanese nare-zushi is unclear. In Japan, the character for "鮓" appears in the Yōrō Code, a law book written in the 8th century. Furthermore, the word "sushi" appears in Shinsen Jikyō, written in the 9th century. However, since the word "sushi" is the noun form of the adjective "sour," there is no doubt that the fish was sour, but whether it was lactic fermentation using rice is not known.

=== Funazushi ===
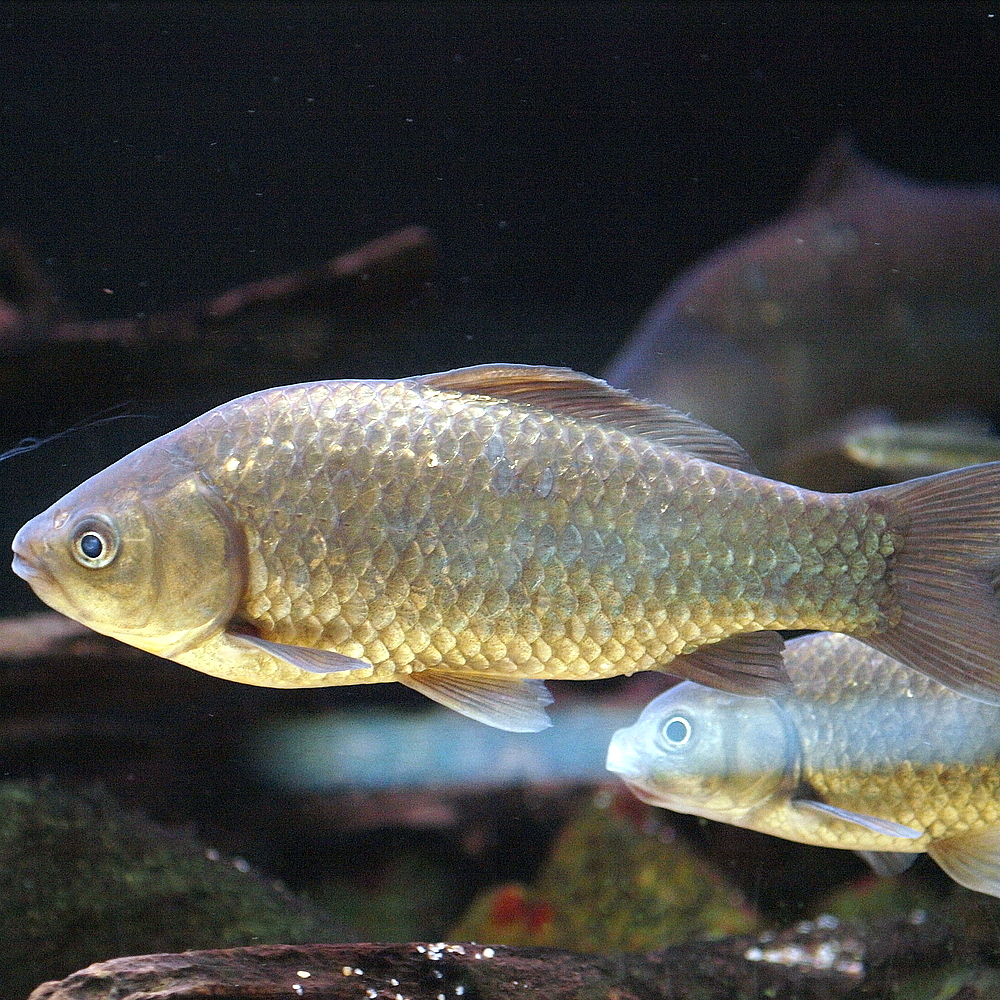
Nigorobuna

Funazushi was made in many parts of Japan in ancient times. Wooden tubs are now used as containers for making funazushi, but until the 14th century, jar-like earthenware vessels were used.

There is a legend that Toyoki Irihiko, prince of Emperor Sujin, a legendary figure sometimes attributed to the 3rd or 4th century, was offered funazushi by the villagers when he stopped by today's Moriyama, Shiga.

The words funazushi and sushi-funa are found in the Prince Nagaya (684 – 20 March 729)'s palace Mokkan and Nijō Street Mokkan.

The Engishiki, an administrative manual written in the 10th century, describes how nare-zushi, a type of fish produced in various parts of Japan, was collected in the capital as a tax. Twentieth-century Japanese food historian Osamu Shinoda (篠田統) considers Japanese sushi to have developed independently in Japan, since Engishiki does not mention carp sushi, which is common in China.

The same Engishiki also states that the central government provided containers, cloth, hemp, sake, rice, salt, and soybeans to Chikuma-kuriya (now Maibara, Shiga) in Ōmi Province, which is still known today as a producer of funazushi, which were then pickled in soy sauce (but not the soy sauce of today), salted, and made into sushi-funa. From this description, it is thought that the prototype of funazushi, in which crucian carp is lacto-fermented with rice, was already in existence at this time.

The 11th century Shinsarugakuki mentions Ōmi when it comes to crucian carp.

It is not certain when the use of crucian carp with ovaries began as an ingredient for funazushi, but the Konjaku Monogatarishū of the 12th century mentions pickled crucian carp with ovaries began in vinegar. However, until the 19th century, ovaries were often absent.

In the 14th century, the process of making wooden tabs/barrels were developed. Tubs were also used in the production of funazushi, but the date of their initiation is unknown. New wood was preferred for sake barrels, while old wood was preferred for funazushi. Because funazushi tubs were small, sake barrels were disassembled and reassembled.

In 1483 and 1485, Chikamoto's diary mentions a gift of funazushi from the Rokkaku clan based in the Ōmi Province.

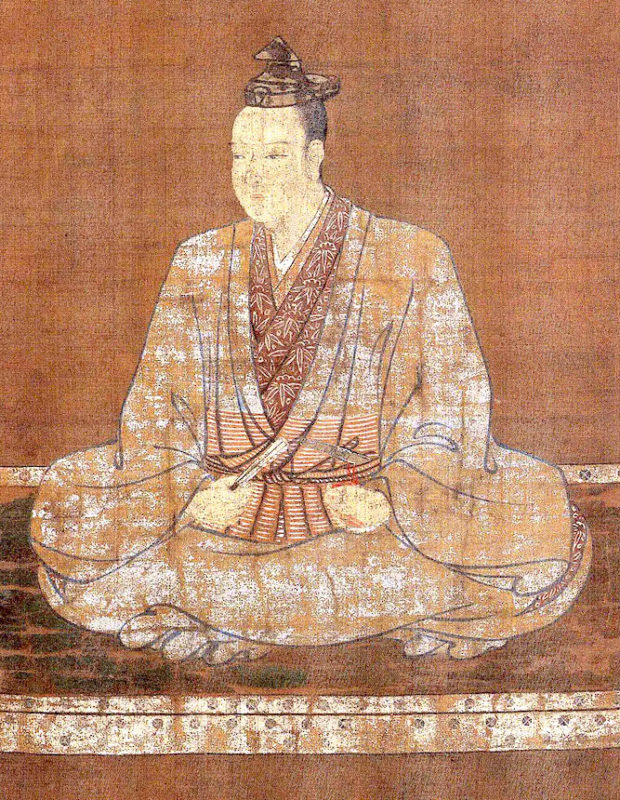
Akechi Mitsuhide. Some say that he killed his lord Oda Nobunaga because Nobunaga complained about the smell of the funazushi Mitsuhide served.

Oda Nobunaga, who helped end the Sengoku period of Japanese civil war in the 16th century, was killed by his subordinate Akechi Mitsuhide. There are various theories as to the cause of the murder, but one theory is that Mitsuhide, who prepared a dinner for Nobunaga just before the murder, held a grudge against Nobunaga because he complained that the fish he was served was rotten. Funazushi was also served at this meal.

In the Edo period, which began in the 17th century, funazushi was made in Ōmi Province (Shiga Prefecture) from crucian carp caught in the spring season and red-leaf crucian carp in the fall and winter. However, it is thought that the fermentation process of funazushi made from red-leaf crucian carp that did not undergo the high temperatures of the summer season was slow and gradually fell into disuse. The current "funazushi" of Shiga Prefecture is made from spring crucian carp.

The 17th century cookbook Gorui Nichiyou Ryouri Shou (合類日用料理抄) describes how to make "sushi from funa in Ōmi".

In winter, the fish is gutted through the gill holes, the head is removed, folded over with salt in a container and pickled in salt. After that, black rice is cooked with less water, mixed with salt, and placed in a container with the fish, with a drop lid and a weight on top. After about 20 days, lighten the weight a little. After about 70 days, they can be eaten. If you put heavy weights on top of the lid after even out the load, and store salt water on top of the lid (to keep the air out,) the bones will be tender and taste better if you leave it on until the following fall.

The water on the lid is changed daily. The fact that production begins in winter is the exact opposite of today, when production begins in summer. In addition, the current method of preparing funazushi is not exactly the same as that practiced in ancient times, as in many modern cases the weights are gradually increased.

In addition, literature from this period often refers to Ōmi crucian carp as gengorobuna. However, this is because many of the crucian carp caught in Lake Biwa were sold under the name of gengorobuna, which was considered a luxury at the time, and it was not until the 1920s that gengorobuna and nigorobuna became generally distinguished from each other.

Yosa Buson, an 18th century poet, left haiku such as "can see clouds over Hikone Castle while trying to eat funazushi" (鮒鮓や彦根が城に雲かかる), "when in a field in the summer, realize whom haven't seen funazushi for a while" (鮒鮓の便りも遠き夏野哉).

In August 1788, Shiba Kōkan, a painter, stopped in Hino, Shiga, where he ate funazushi that had been preserved for three years.

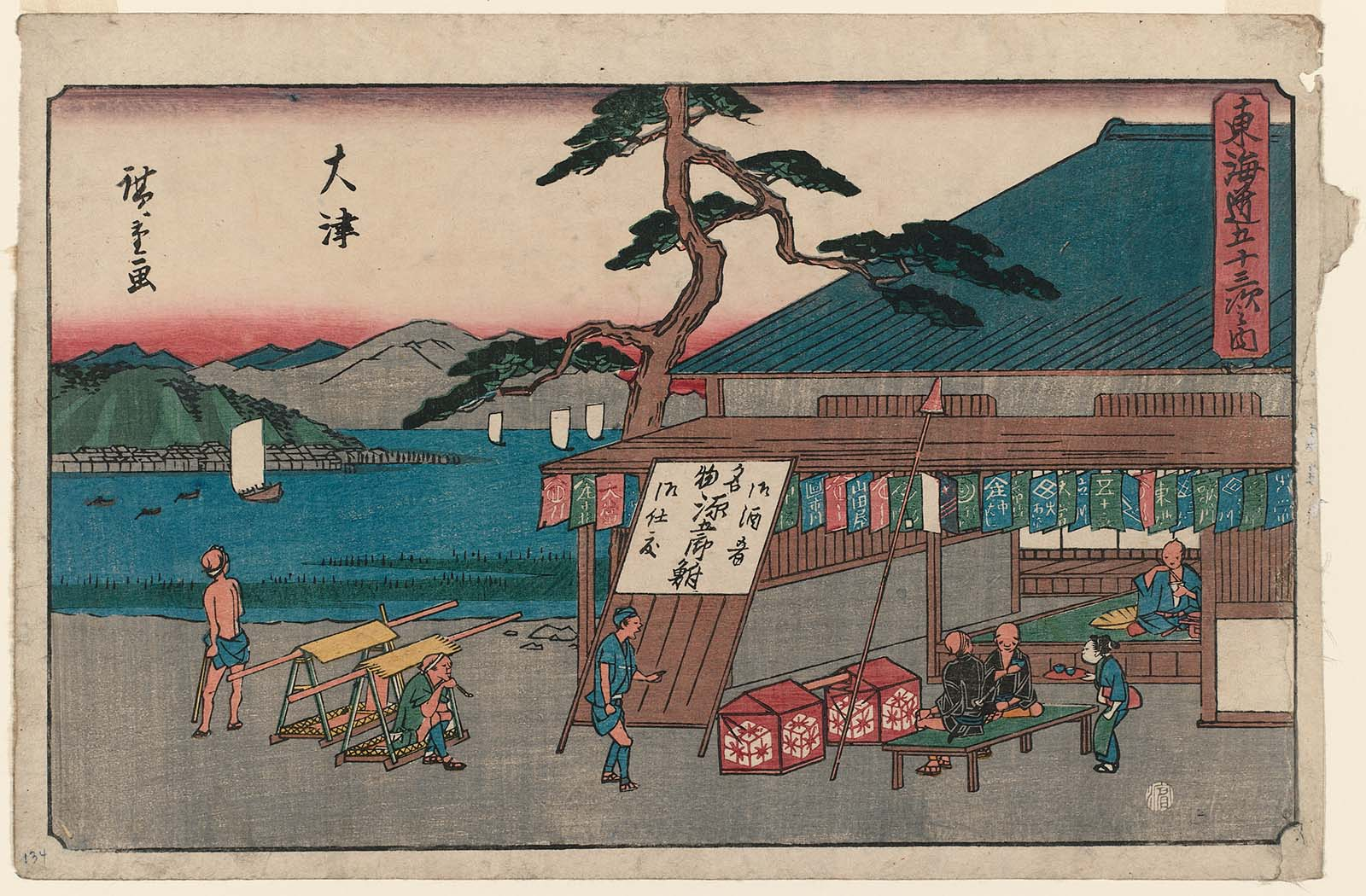
A view of the area around Ōtsu-juku, depicted in the 19th century as The Fifty-three Stations of the Tōkaidō. There is a sign that reads "Sake snacks: The famous gengorobuna is ready." (御酒肴 名物源五郎鮒 御仕度) This "gengorobuna" appears to refer to funazushi.

In 1896, Japanese poet Masaoka Shiki wrote a haiku as "while eating funazushi, Seta became evening and the bell of Mii-dera temple was heard." (鮒鮓や瀬田の夕照三井の鐘) In an essay titled "A Drop of Bokuju," he also wrote a complaint that "people these days use words derived from funazushi without knowing how to make it."

A book published in 1904 states, "Add a little salt to funazushi in a soup dish, pour in hot water, cover with a lid, and after a while it becomes a delicious soup.

In an essay published in 1916, the author gave his landlord some gengorobuna funazushi from his hometown, which pleased the landlord, who loved to drink. However, when the author served it to his friends, they all refused to eat it because of the smell. So the author put the funazushi on top of rice, covered it with hot bancha green tea, and ate it in chazuke (rice with green tea.)"

In 1935, the commercial production of funazushi was Yasu, Inukami, Takashima, Kurita, Gamo, Kanzaki, and Higashiazai, in that order.

In the 1950s, containers for making funa zushi switched from wooden tubs to plastic. Maintenance became easier and fermentation became more stable.

== See also ==
- Surströmming
- Hongeo-hoe
- Gravlax
- Kiviak
