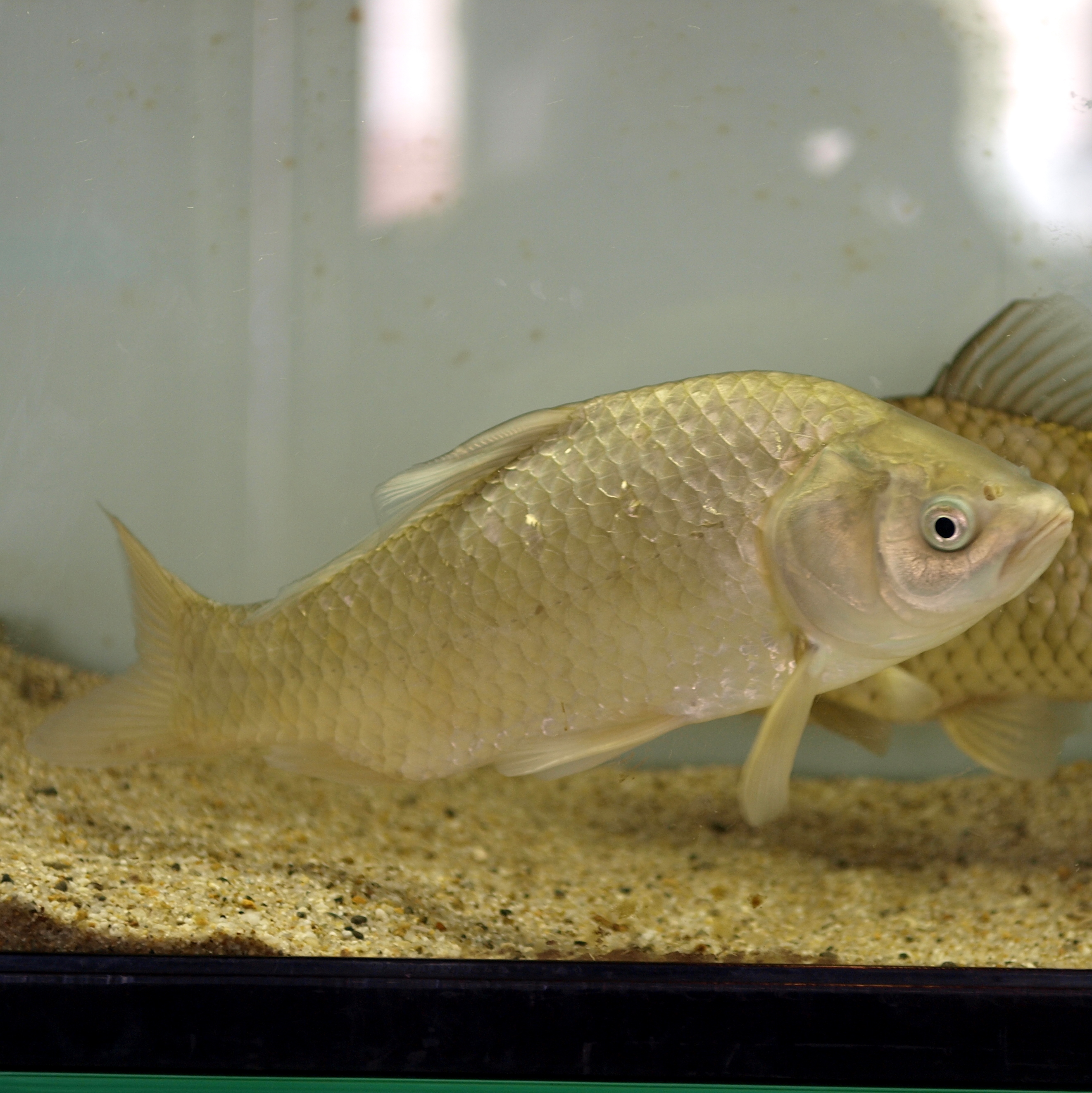

Conservation status
- Endangered (IUCN 3.1)

Scientific classification
- Kingdom: Animalia
- Phylum: Chordata
- Class: Actinopterygii
- Order: Cypriniformes
- Family: Cyprinidae
- Subfamily: Cyprininae
- Genus: Carassius
- Species: C. cuvieri

Binomial name
- Carassius cuvieri Temminck & Schlegel, 1846

Synonyms
- C. auratus caviers Temminck & Schlegel, 1846; C. auratus cuvieri Temminck & Schlegel, 1846; C. carassius cuvieri Temminck & Schlegel, 1846

= Japanese white crucian carp =

Species of fish

The Japanese white crucian carp, also known as Japanese carp, white crucian carp, or gengoro-buna (Carassius cuvieri), is a species of freshwater fish in the carp family (family Cyprinidae). It is found in Japan and, as an introduced species, in several other countries in Asia. This fish is closely related to the commonly known goldfish.

== Description ==
This is a medium-sized fish, growing up to 50 cm, with a broad head and a blunt snout. The lips are fleshy, and lacking barbels. The body is deep and laterally compressed, with a distinctly humped back. The scales are large and cycloid in shape, with a complete lateral line. Serration is present on the last ray of the dorsal and anal fins, and the caudal fin is forked.

== Taxonomy ==
The Japanese white crucian carp was formerly considered a subspecies of wild goldfish, and was classified as C. auratus cuvieri. It has now been elevated to species rank, however some authors are in disagreement. Genetic studies using mitochondrial DNA indicate that this species diverged from the ancestral form approximately one million years ago, during the early Pleistocene.

The original wild species unique to Lake Biwa is called gengorō-buna (ゲンゴロウブナ (源五郎鮒)). Fossil pharyngeal teeth that appear to belong to ancestral form of Japanese white crucian carp have been found in the upper part of the Katata Formation, derived from sediment layers of the former Paleo-lake Katata, on the southwest shore of Lake Biwa.

== Distribution and habitat ==
Historically, the Japanese white crucian carp was endemic to Lake Biwa, as well as the connected Yodo River system, in Japan. However, it has been introduced to Taiwan and Korea. In South Korea initial introductions were the result of stocking by government agencies. Subsequently, the species has also been spread through the Buddhist practice of "life releasing", in which animals destined for slaughter are instead released into the wild.

Possession of this species without a permit is prohibited in the state of Vermont.

It is a freshwater fish, preferring still or slow moving waters, and occurs at depths up to 20 meters. Typical habitats include lakes, canals, and backwaters.

== Feeding, diet, and related information ==
An omnivorous species, Japanese white crucian carp feed on a variety foods, including algae, phytoplankton, macrophytes, and invertebrates, such as insects and crustaceans. During the larval stage, zooplankton comprise the primary food source. Upon reaching 1.8 cm the young fish form schools and move offshore to feed on phytoplankton. Phytoplankton remains the primary food source through adulthood. This is reflected in the unique structure of their pharyngeal teeth, which are specialized to feed on phytoplankton.

== Reproduction ==
Spawning occurs from April to June, and takes place in areas of aquatic vegetation, including reed beds. Some individuals will migrate into connected satellite water bodies in order to spawn. Larvae and juveniles tend to remain close to spawning areas.

== Importance to humans ==
Japanese white crucian carp, as well as other crucian carp species, are the target of an established local fishing industry on Lake Biwa. It is being used as a substitute for the depleted stock of nigoro-buna in the preparation of the intense-smelling fermented local dish funazushi due to the nigoro-buna's falling numbers.

A larger cultivated variant, with a taller body depth known as hera-buna (ヘラブナ), was developed from the original species, cultured in the Osaka area and now released in many areas of Japan for sport fishing. It is enjoyed for catch-and-release. It is a major carp species in Chinese aquaculture, where it is raised for food.

This species has been identified as an intermediate host of Clinostomum complanatum, a parasitic fluke capable of infecting humans.

== Conservation status ==
The wild species in Lake Biwa is listed as an endangered species in the Japanese Red Data Book. Factors in its decline include water pollution, invasive species, and overfishing.
