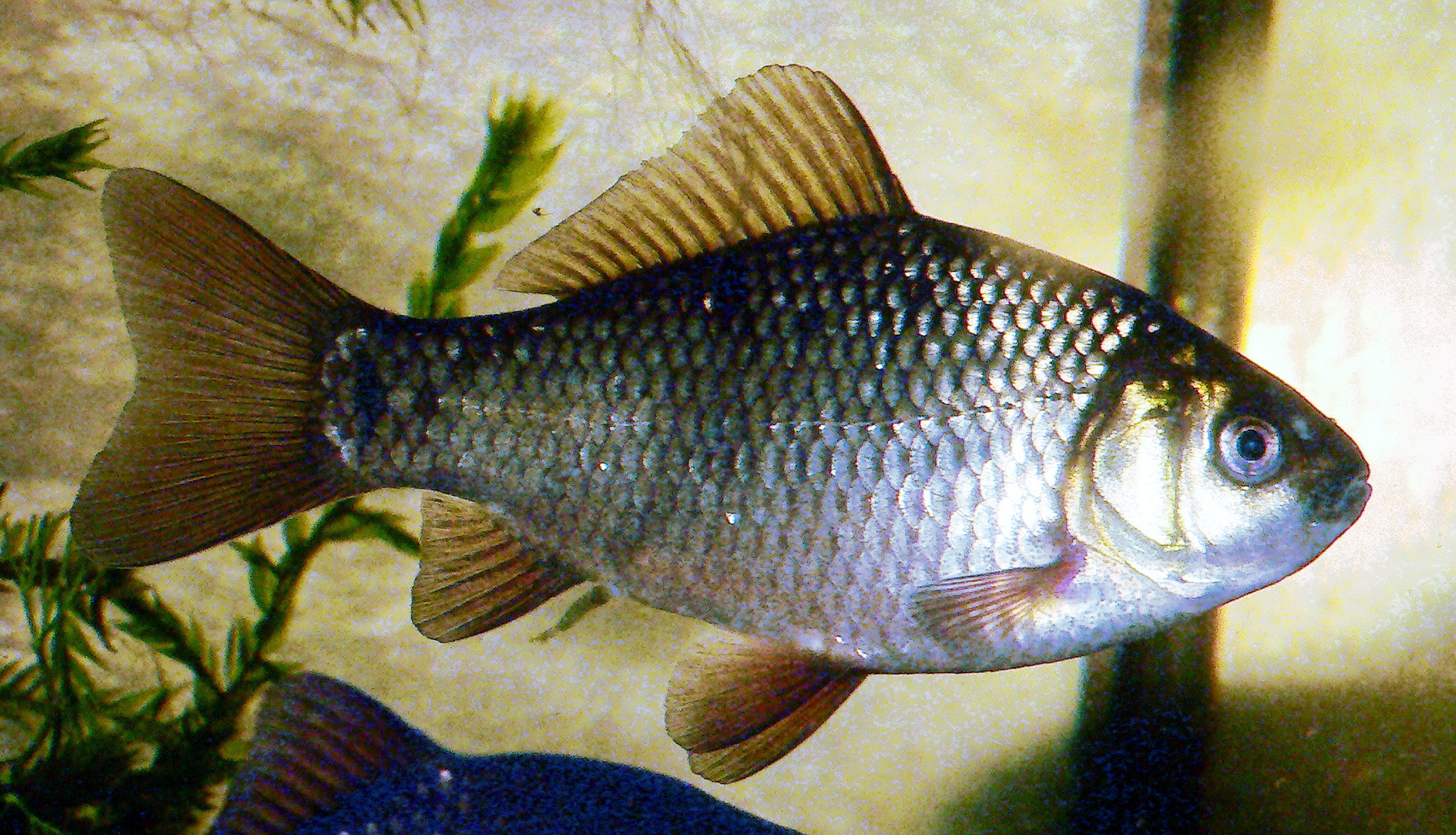
- Crucian carp, Carassius carassius
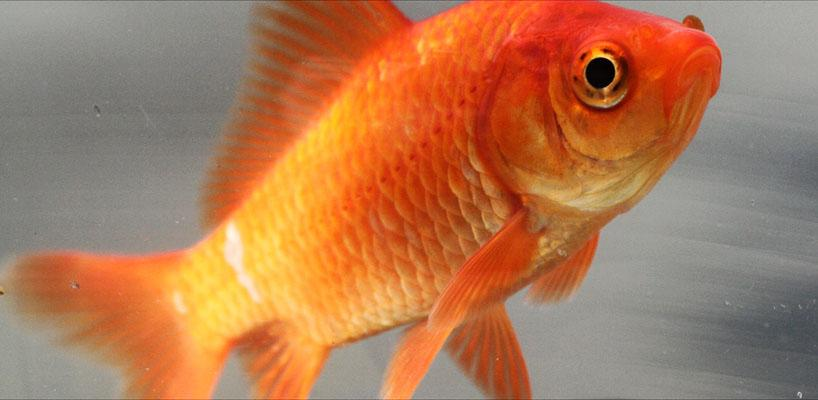
- Goldfish, Carassius auratus

Scientific classification
- Kingdom: Animalia
- Phylum: Chordata
- Class: Actinopterygii
- Division: Teleostei
- Order: Cypriniformes
- Family: Cyprinidae
- Subfamily: Cyprininae
- Genus: Carassius; Jarocki, 1822

Type species
- Carassius carassius Linnaeus, 1758

Synonyms
- Cyprinopsis Fitzinger, 1832; Neocarassius Castelnau, 1872

= Carassius =

Genus of fishes

Carassius is a genus in the ray-finned fish family Cyprinidae. Most species in this genus are commonly known as crucian carps, though that term often refers specifically to C. carassius. The best-known species is the goldfish (C. auratus). They have a Eurasian distribution, apparently originating further to the west than the typical carps (Cyprinus genus, which includes the common carp).

The genus may not be monophyletic, with molecular phylogenetics finding that the genus Carassiodes is nested within Carassius; that clade is in turn sister to the typical carps in the genus Cyprinus.

== Species ==
Carassius contains the following species:

- Carassius auratus (Linnaeus, 1758) (Goldfish)
- Carassius buergeri Temminck & Schlegel, 1846
- Carassius carassius (Linnaeus, 1758) (Crucian carp)
- Carassius cuvieri Temminck & Schlegel, 1846 (Japanese white crucian carp)
- Carassius gibelio (Bloch, 1782) (Prussian carp)
- Carassius langsdorfii Temminck & Schlegel, 1846 (Ginbuna)
- Carassius praecipuus Kottelat, 2017
