= Nigorobuna =

Subspecies of fish

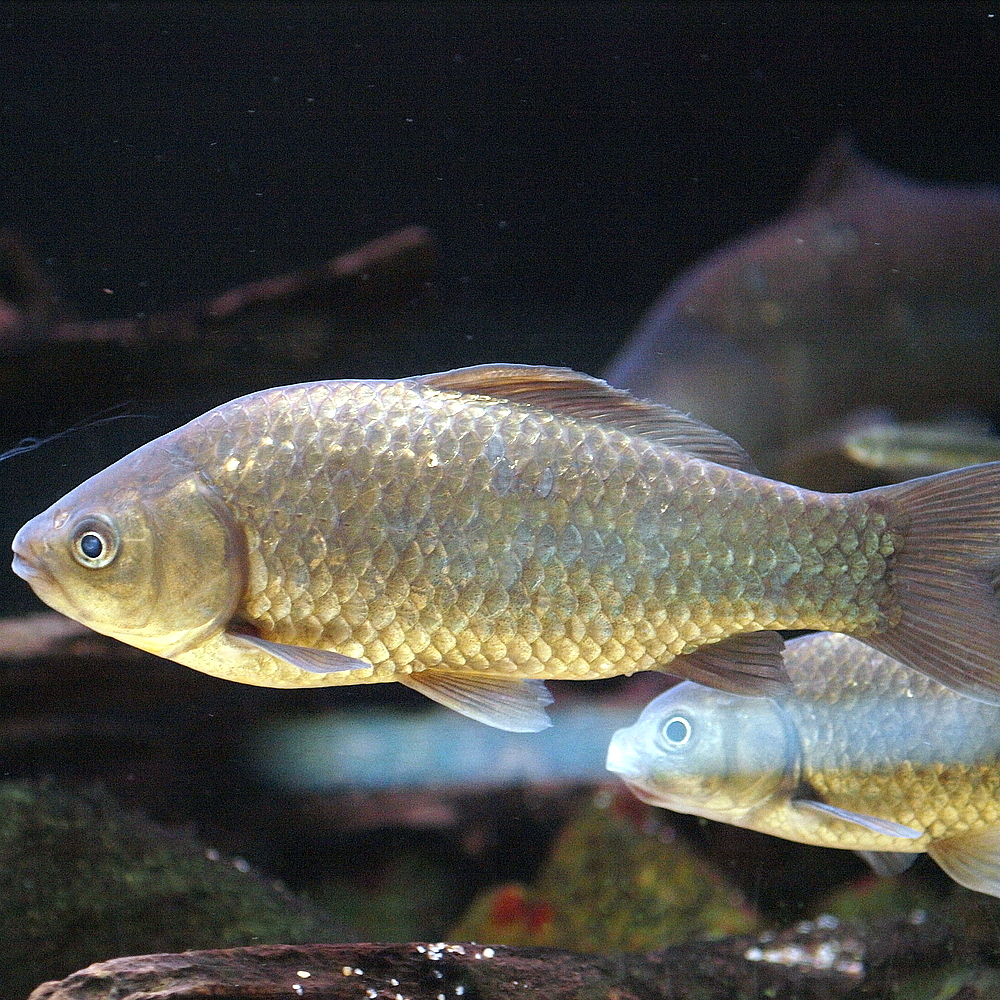
A nigorobuna of Lake Biwa

Nigoro-buna, sometimes called round crucian carp, is a type of wild goldfish (Carassius auratus grandoculis) or related cyprinid (Carassius buergeri grandoculis) endemic to Japan. Its habitat is limited to Lake Biwa, its tributaries and distributaries, and irrigation canals, in the Shiga Prefecture (west-central Honshu), northeast of Kyoto.

The fish is of culinary importance locally in Shiga Prefecture, where it is used as an ingredient for funazushi, a type of narezushi. The fermented fish is closely packed with rice and salt in tubs.

== Etymology ==
The Japanese name nigorobuna (ニゴロブナ) has been ascribed various etymologies. One has it that it earned the name ni-gorō-buna (Japanese: 似五郎鮒) meaning "gorō-buna's look-alike", because once it attains sizes of approximately 1.2–1.3 shaku (≈feet), it begins to look confusingly similar to the gengorō-buna (源五郎鮒) (C. cuvieri, the wild form of the Japanese crucian carp) which is a closely related species that is also endemic to the lake. It is alternatively styled nigorobuna 煮頃鮒, which crudely translates to "braising-timely-carp".

== Taxonomy ==
Some literature refer to nigorobuna as subspecies Carassius auratus grandoculis,

It is also given as subspecies Carassius buergeri grandoculis in governmental and academic literature as well as the Japanese database. The subspecies exhibits polyploidy.

== Morphology ==
A typical adult nigorobuna attains 35 cm (14 in)length at maturity. (Note: Nihon no tansuigyo (1989) gives 35cm; and its 2nd ed. has 20-35 cm.) (Note: Shin nihon dōbutsu zukan gives 200-400 mm,;Shokuhin kenkō daijiten gives 35-40 cm (13¾-15¾ inches).)

Its shape resembles the nagabuna (Note: The MOE Red databook gave "subspecies 1", and FishBase (version of 2006) gave this subspecies C. a. buergeri. But FishBase no longer lists this subspecies.) that populate Lake Suwa; its body depth is short, and breadth is wide.

The head is large, with a ventricular contour that is characteristically ridged. The mouth slit is slanted upwards. Around 61 (or 52–72) gill rakers can be counted, and the dorsal fin rays consist of one spine and 17 (or 15 to 18) soft rays. The anal fin has one spine and five soft rays. The basal length of the dorsal fin is rather long. The total length is 2.7× the body depth.

== Behavior ==
Larvae and juveniles are found on the surface and medium depths entrenched within reeds around the lake, in other words, inlets rich in aquatic plants. Adults occupy shallower waters in summer and move to deeper waters during the cold winter.

One study showed that when larvae of about 1 cm length were compared, nigorobuna was "scarce(ly)" feeding on algae, compared with local genogoro-buna, which had 25–50% algal digestive tract content by bulk. The fish showed a preference for certain water fleas over another, relying heavily on Chydorus spp. (Note: Cf. Data related to Chydorus at Wikispecies.) and to a lesser extent on Mesocyclops. By contrast, the gengoro-buna kept in the same enclosure preferred rotifer spp. The fry (larvae) of both species largely ignored other types of zooplankton (such as Alona, Scapholeberis, and copepodid larvae) which were plentiful. As they grow into juveniles exceeding 1 cm, the nigorobuna begin pecking at aquatic plants to feed on attached algae, so by the time they attain 2 cm lengths, algae account for half their diet (and rotifers represent a small percentage). When they grow larger, they capture somewhat bottom-dwelling zooplankton.

Adults spawn from April to June, laying eggs on aquatic plants when water levels rise due to the rainy season. The hatchlings live by the reedy shore, and move offshore as they grow, reaching full size in 2 to 3 years.

== Uses ==
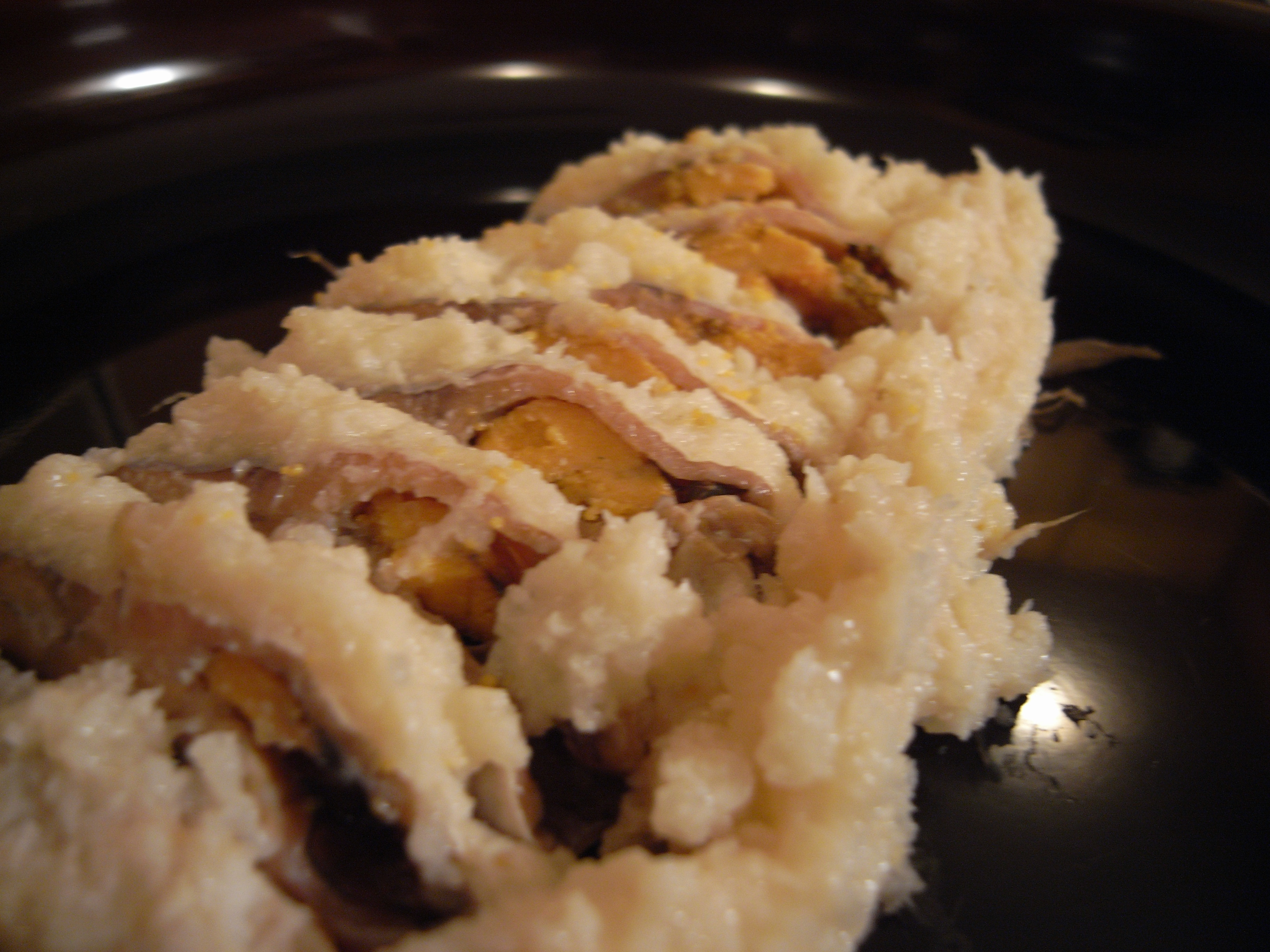
Funa-zushi made from "nigoro crucian carp": Females carrying roe (pictured) are especially prized.

This is a highly prized fish commercially, made into funazushi, where whole fish are salted and fermented in beds of cooked rice. An authentic funazushi traditionally must use the "round crucian carp", and for this reason it has been dubbed sushi-buna meaning "the crucian carp for sushi". The dish, a type of narezushi, is a local delicacy of Shiga Prefecture, and known for its pungent odor.

This species is said to make superior funazushi that is tender down to the bones, in contrast to imitations made by using gengoro-buna (Carassius cuvieri) as a substitute. The ginbuna (Carassius langsdorfii) is also said to be used as a substitute.

== Fishing regulations ==
The annual catch was estimated to be 500 tons in 1965, fell to 178 tons by 1989, and drastically down to 18 tons by 1997 so that efforts were begun to release fishery-raised spawn into nearby rice paddies connected with the water system. Nowadays, the species is also farmed in Saitama Prefecture.

Shiga Prefecture, in its announced project to recover the fish stock, promulgated rules through its Lake Biwa Fisheries Management Commission, effective April 1, 2007, prohibiting the capture of fish measuring 22 cm or less.

== Vulnerability ==
The Japanese Ministry of the Environment's published Red List (2018) listed the fish subspecies as endangered (IB).

The devastation of numbers is blamed on habitat loss (spawning ground), as well predation by introduced species. Adults are known to be taken by black bass, and the larvae and eggs are fed on by bluegill, both of which have become invasive in the Lake.

The impact of predatory fish may be a secondary aggravating factor, the core cause being man-made changes to the lake's landscape according to some opinion.

The nigorobuna's spawning grounds are the reed belts in Lake Biwa and the lagoons attached to the lake referred to as naiko (内湖), as well as rice paddies. Most of the reed belt zones were altered by the lake shore dykes project (1976–1991), the number of lagoons fell to just over twenty, (Note: Reclaimed to be converted to rice paddies, and so forth.) and by 1995 the total lagoon area was 425 ha (1,050 acres) (15% of the total size in 1940). Also the canals connecting the bodies of water were fitted with sluice gates, hampering the fish from traveling.

The current situation is not well-described as blockage by gates; the farmland consolidation (hojō- seibi) project was conducted that raised the ground of the rice paddies, (Note: To prevent the paddies from being flooded whenever the water level of the lake went up.) and instead of drawing water from canals, these farms switched to pumping water via PVC pipes, depriving the aquatic life of their conduits to enter..
