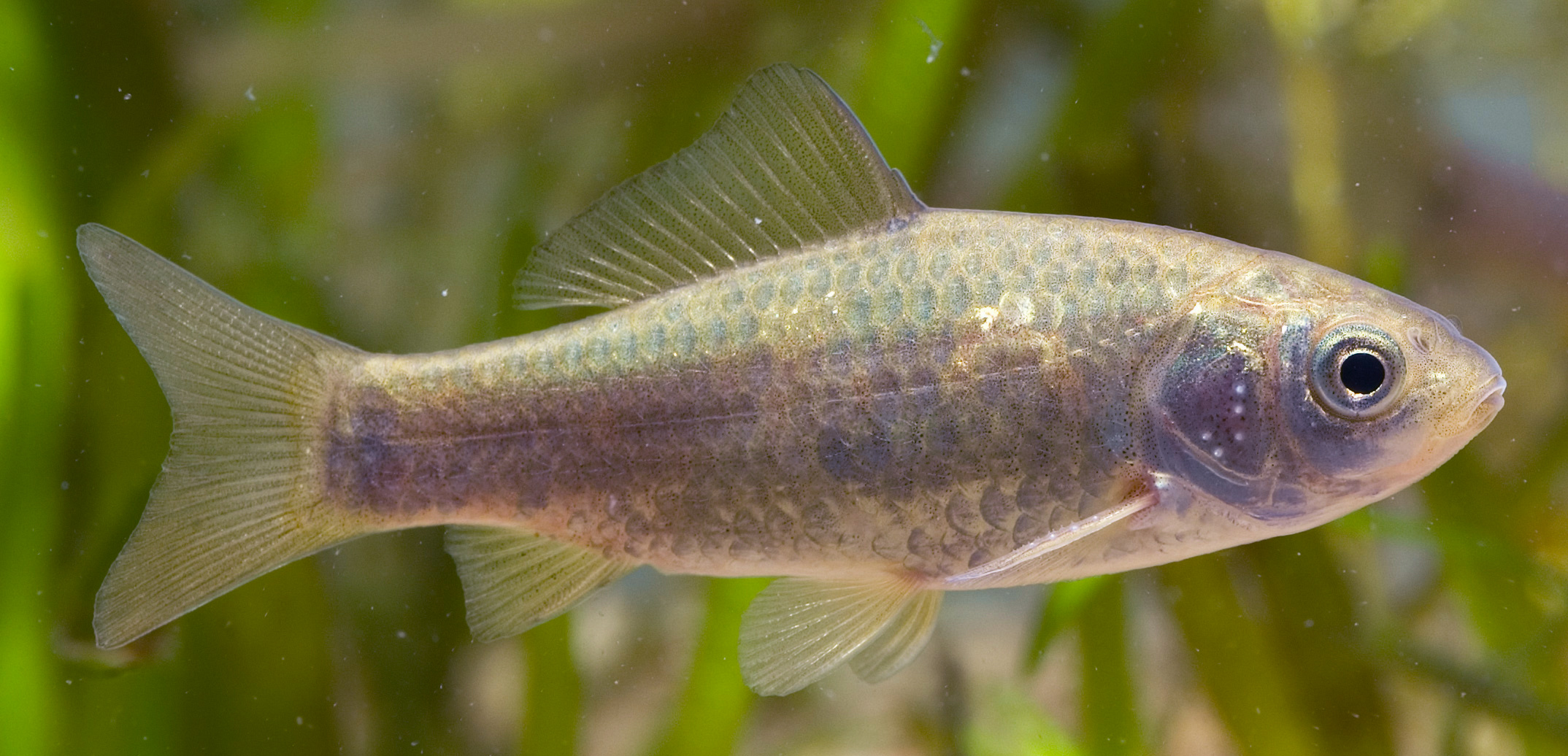

Scientific classification
- Kingdom: Animalia
- Phylum: Chordata
- Class: Actinopterygii
- Division: Teleostei
- Order: Cypriniformes
- Family: Cyprinidae
- Genus: Carassius
- Species: C. buergeri

Binomial name
- Carassius buergeri Temminck & Schlegel, 1846

= Carassius buergeri =

Naga-buna

Species of fish

Carassius buergeri (Japanese: naga-buna, ナガブナ) is a species related to the goldfish in the ray-finned fish genus Carassius, within the carp family Cyprinidae.

== See also ==
Nigorobuna, which may be a sub-species.
