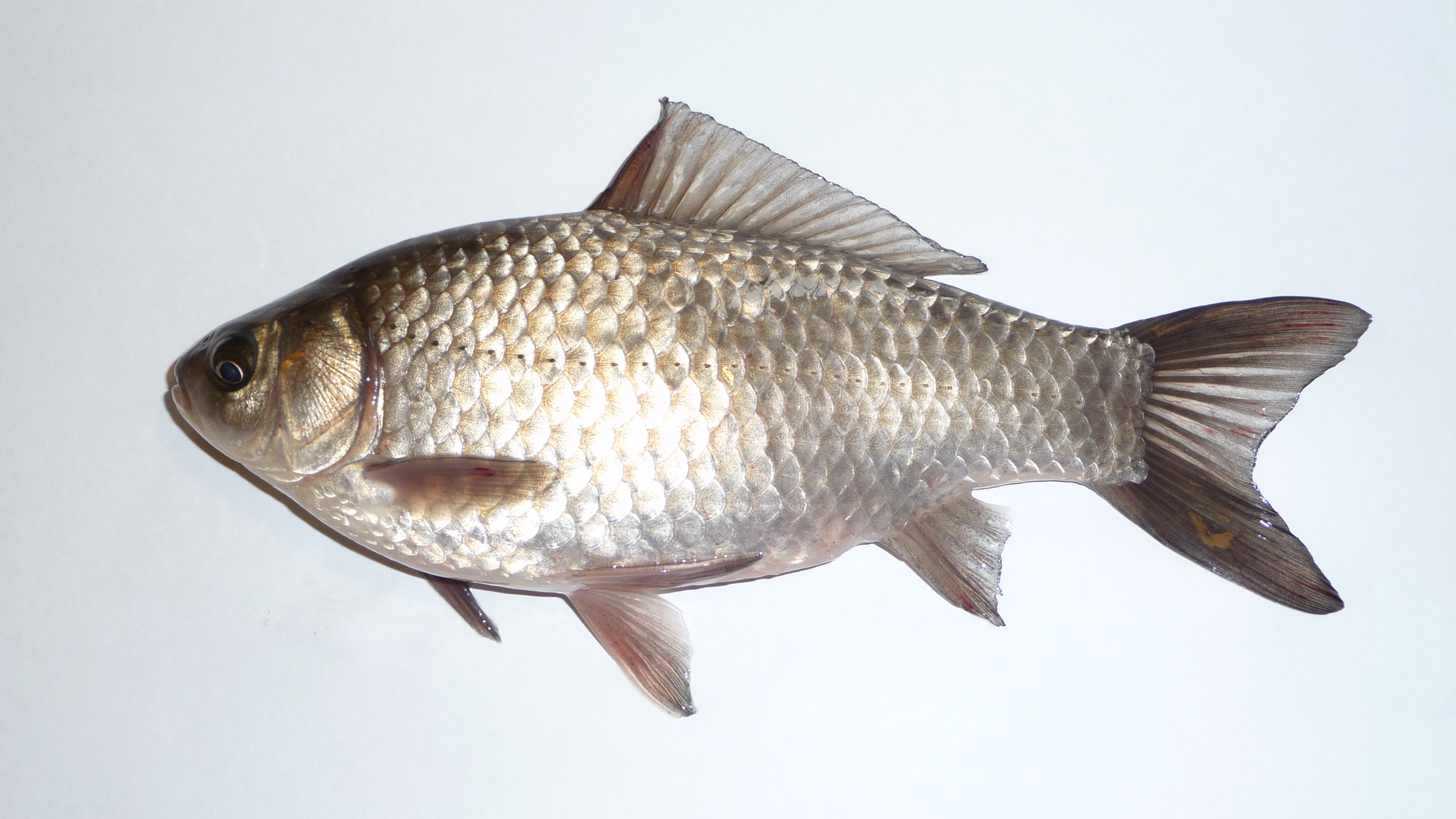

Scientific classification
- Kingdom: Animalia
- Phylum: Chordata
- Class: Actinopterygii
- Division: Teleostei
- Order: Cypriniformes
- Family: Cyprinidae
- Subfamily: Cyprininae
- Genus: Carassius
- Species: C. gibelio

Binomial name
- Carassius gibelio (Bloch, 1782)

Synonyms
- Carassius auratus gibelio (Bloch, 1782); Carassius auratus gibelio natio vovkii Johansen, 1945; Carassius bucephalus Heckel, 1837; Carassius ellipticus Heckel, 1848; Carassius vulgaris kolenty Dybowski, 1877; Carassius vulgaris ventrosus Walecki, 1863; Cyprinus gibelio Bloch, 1782

= Prussian carp =

Species of fish

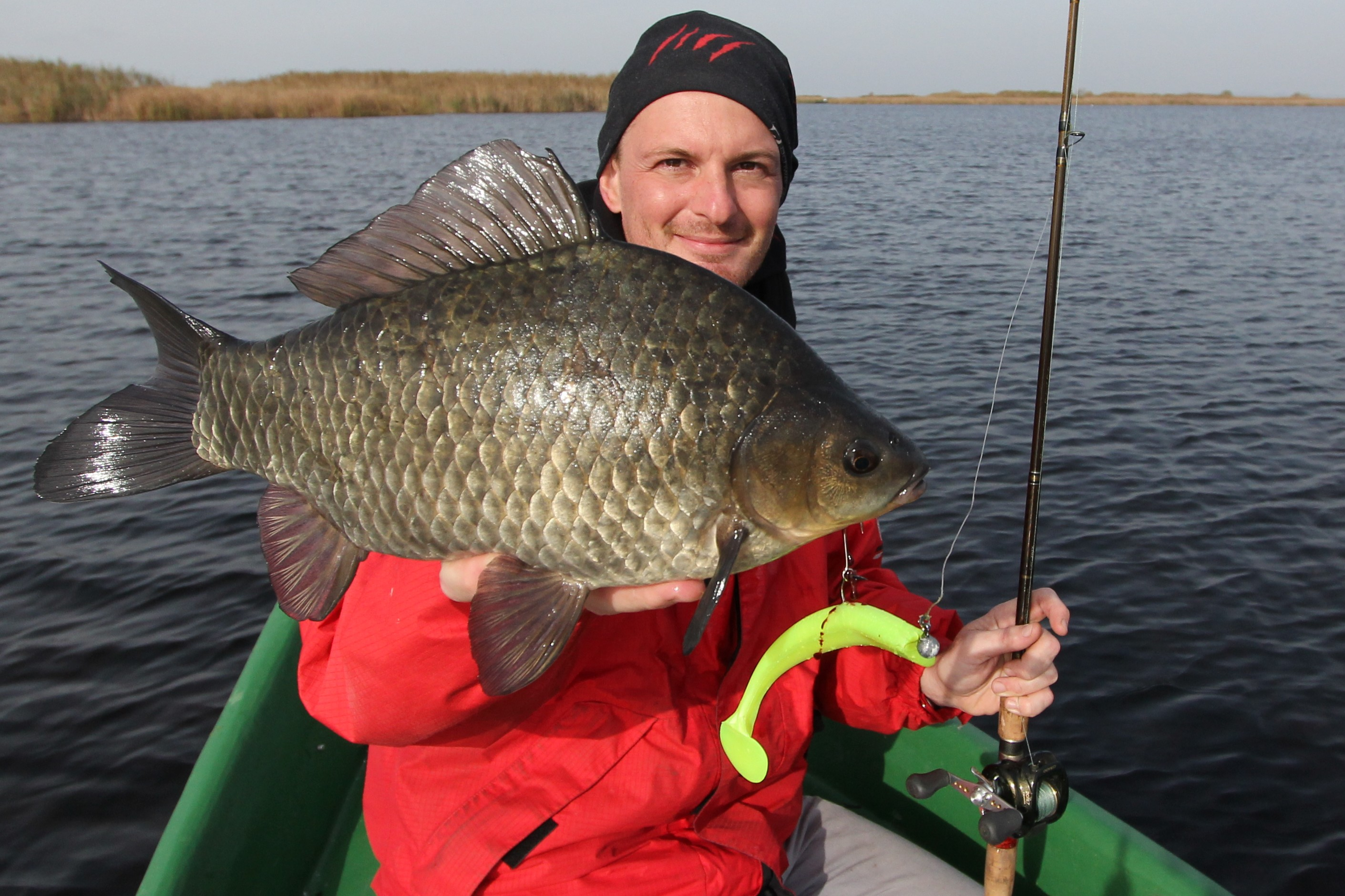
Large Carassius gibelio caught at Holbina, Romania, in October 2015

The Prussian carp, silver Prussian carp or Gibel carp (Carassius gibelio) is a cyprinid of the genus Carassius in the subfamily Cyprininae, which includes other fish such as the Crucian carp, goldfish, and barbs. It is medium-sized when fully-grown, and does not exceed a weight of 3 kilograms (6.6 lb) and a length of 45 centimetres (18 in). They are usually silver, although other color variations exist. They are omnivorous and feed on plankton, invertebrates, plant material and detritus. Originally from Siberia or central Europe, they have been introduced to and are now inhabiting lakes, ponds, and slow-moving rivers throughout Europe, North America, and Asia. It has become one of the most successful introduced fish species in the European Russia region, now abundant in both the Volga and Kama rivers, particularly in coastal areas overgrown with aquatic vegetation.

Prussian carps are a highly invasive fish species in areas outside their native range. They reproduce and spread rapidly. In 2020, scientists demonstrated that a small proportion of fertilized Prussian carp eggs ingested by waterfowl survive passing through the digestive tract and hatch after being retrieved from the feces. Birds exhibit strong preference for fish eggs, while cyprinids produce hundreds of thousands of eggs at a single spawning event. These data indicate that despite the low proportion of eggs surviving the digestive tract of birds, endozoochory might provide a potentially overlooked dispersal mechanism of Prussian carps. If proven under natural circumstances, endozoochorous dispersal of invasive fish could be a strong conservation concern for freshwater biodiversity.

Prussian carp are capable of gynogenesis, meaning sperm is required to fertilize their eggs, but the male gamete does not contribute any DNA to the embryo. Females lay eggs and then "steal" sperm from related species. In other words, they are able to reproduce from unfertilized egg.

== Description ==
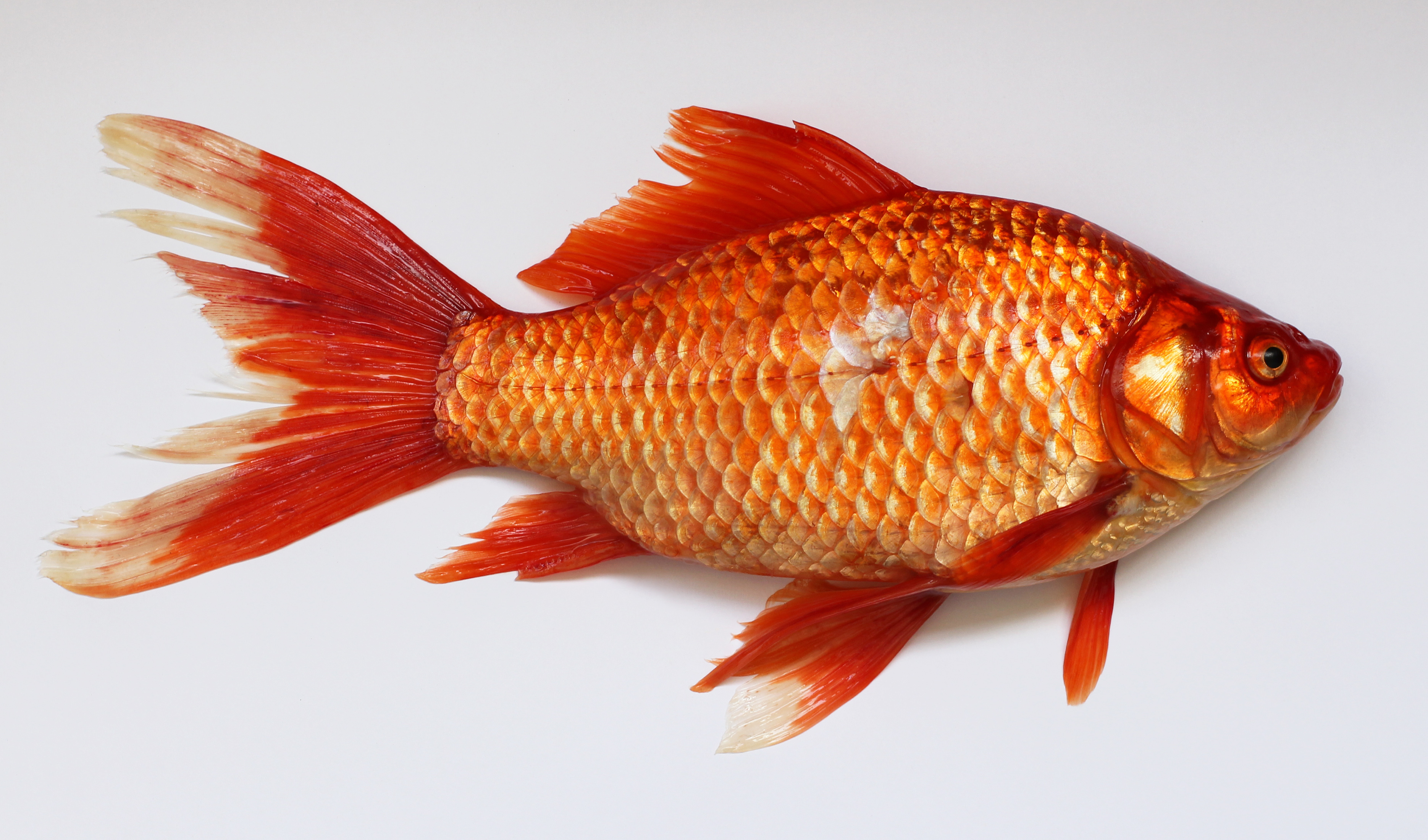
An orange colored wild-caught Prussian carp with goldfish-like coloration.

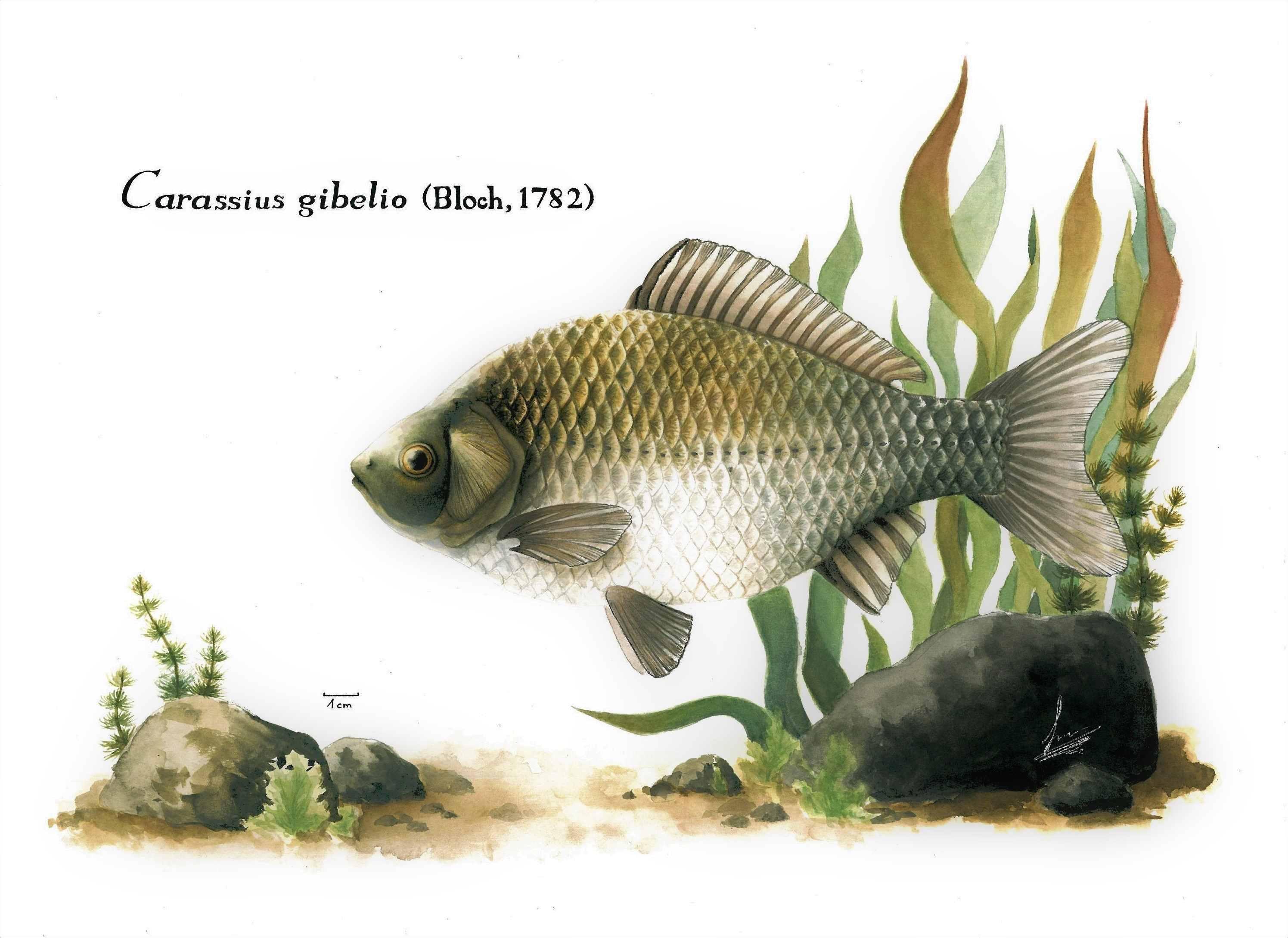
Carassius gibelio illustration

The Prussian carp is a deep-bodied, robust fish which resembles the crucian carp (Carassius carassius) and grows to about 10 to 35 cm (4 to 14 in) in length. Its scales are larger than those of the crucian carp, and it typically has 27 to 32 scales along the lateral line, whereas the crucian carp usually has between 31 and 35. The species is silvery, sometimes with a faint golden tinge, while the crucian carp has a burnished gold appearance. The Prussian carp's tail is more deeply forked than that of the crucian carp.

Video of Prussian carp in Kõrvemaa, Estonia (October 2022)
