= Carassius praecipuus =

Scientific classification
- Kingdom: Animalia
- Phylum: Chordata
- Class: Actinopterygii
- Order: Cypriniformes
- Family: Cyprinidae
- Genus: Carassius
- Species: C. praecipuus

Binomial name
- Carassius praecipuus Maurice Kottelat, 2017

Species of cyprinid

Carassius praecipuus is a species of cyprinid found in the Nam Chat river in Xiangkhouang province in Laos. It has a compressed, moderately elongate body with a brownish-yellow coloration.

== Taxonomy ==
Its species name (Latin: praecipuus, lit. 'uncommon') alludes to the unexpected presence of Carassius genus in the Mekong drainage.

The species was described by Maurice Kottelat in 2017.

== Distribution and habitat ==
It is only found in the Nam Chat river in Laos. However, it may also be present in nearby bodies of water in the Mekong drainage.

== Description ==
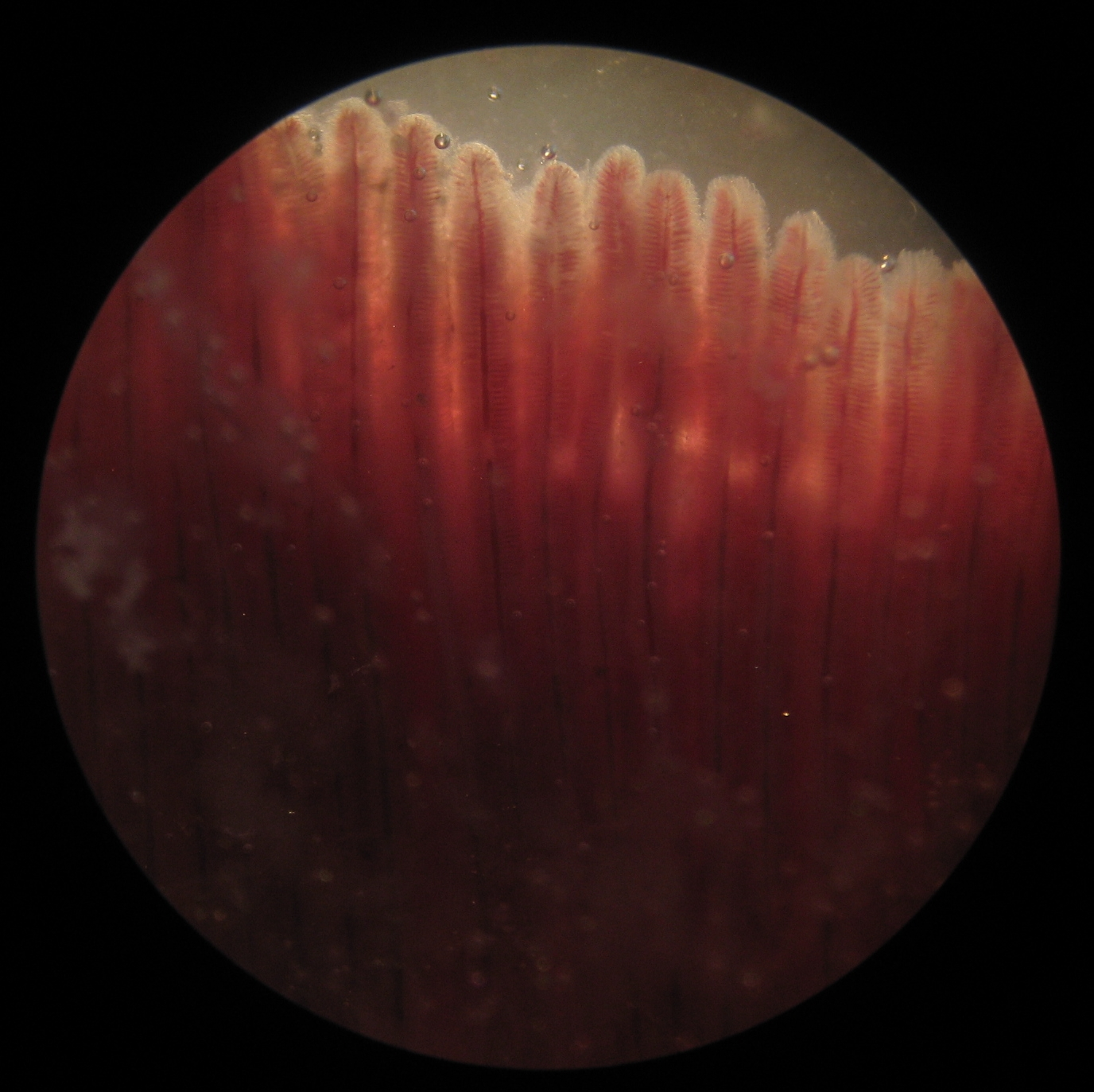
Crucian carp gills under a microscope, showing high density of gill rakers.

It is yellowish-brown in body color and reaches up to 62 millimetres (2.4 in) in standard length and 80.8 millimetres (3.18 in) in total length. It can be distinguished from other species of Carassius by its low count of dorsal fin rays (9-11 1/2), lateral line scales (25-27), and gill rakers (20-21).

== Behaviour ==
=== Reproduction and life cycle ===
Oocytes have been collected from a specimen in February, so it can be inferred that the species spawns at the end of the dry season or the start of the wet season. The specimen measured was the largest and measured 62 mm (2.4 in) SL, so sexual maturity is presumably attained at this length. Eggs of the closely related Carassius auratus hatch within 4-6 days, so Carassius praecipuus eggs could be assumed to hatch quickly.

=== Feeding ===
Not much is known about the feeding behavior of the species. Carassius auratus consumes invertebrates and plant matter in the wild.

== See also ==
Carassius auratus
