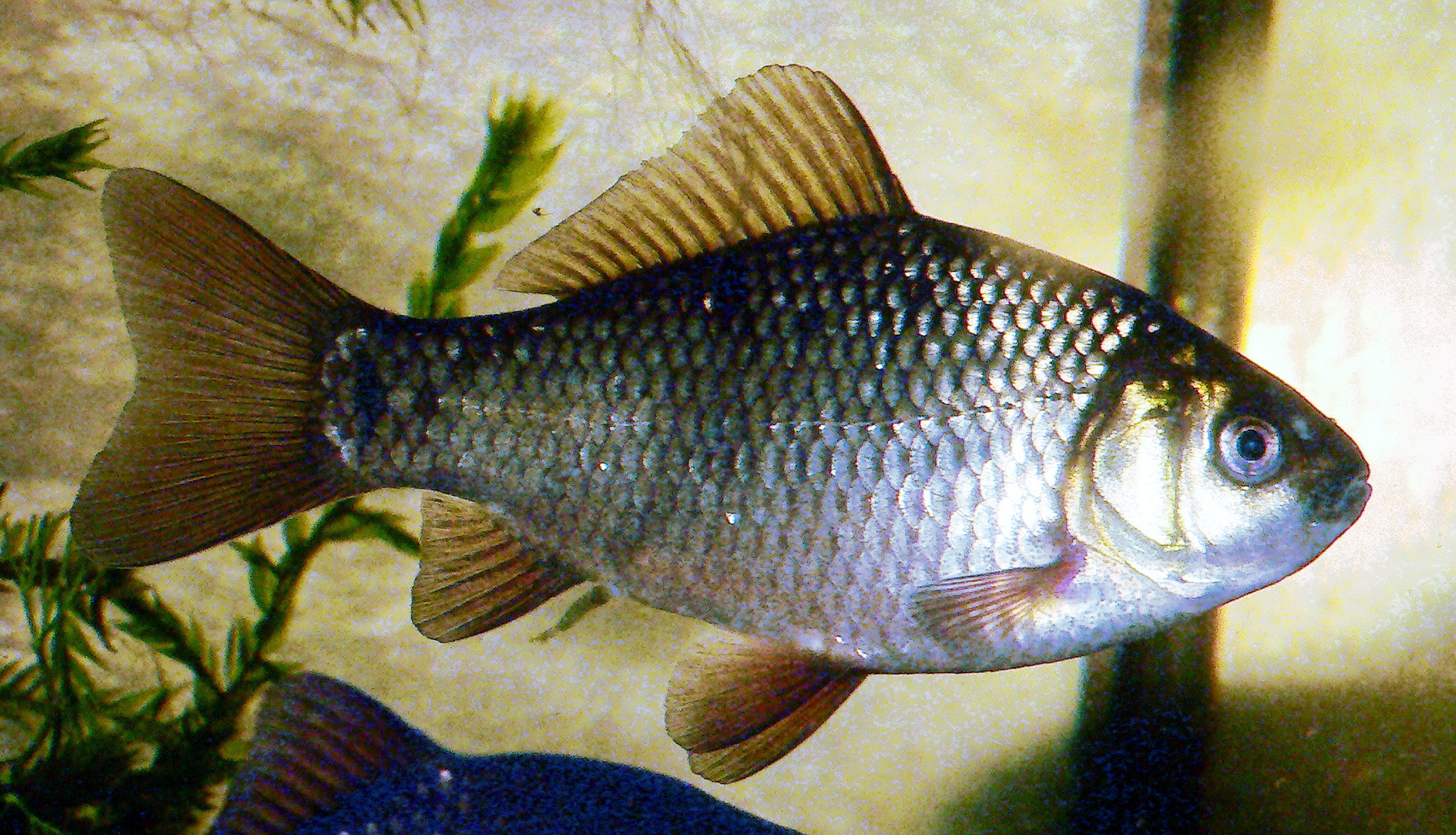

Conservation status
- Least Concern (IUCN 3.1)

Scientific classification
- Kingdom: Animalia
- Phylum: Chordata
- Class: Actinopterygii
- Division: Teleostei
- Order: Cypriniformes
- Family: Cyprinidae
- Subfamily: Cyprininae
- Genus: Carassius
- Species: C. carassius

Binomial name
- Carassius carassius (Linnaeus, 1758)

Synonyms
- Carassius moles (Agassiz, 1835); Cyprinus carassius Linnaeus, 1758; Cyprinus moles Agassiz, 1835; Carassius humilis Heckel, 1837; Cyprinus charax Lesniewski, 1837; Carassius charax (Lesniewski, 1837); Carassius vulgaris Nordmann, 1840; Carassius linnaei Bonaparte, 1845; Carassius oblongus Heckel & Kner, 1858; Carassius linnei Malm, 1877

= Crucian carp =

Species of fish

The crucian carp (Carassius carassius) is a medium-sized member of the carp family Cyprinidae. It occurs widely in northern European regions. Its name derives from the Low German karusse or karutze, possibly from Medieval Latin coracinus (a kind of river fish).

== Distribution ==
The crucian carp is a widely distributed European species, its range spanning from England to Russia; it is found as far north as the Arctic Circle in the Scandinavian countries, and as far south as central France and the region of the Black Sea. Its habitat includes lakes, ponds, and slow-moving rivers. It has been established that the fish is native to England and not introduced.

The crucian carp is a medium-sized cyprinid, typically 15 centimetres (5.9 in) in body length, and rarely exceeds in weight over 2 kilograms (4.4 lb), but a maximum total length of 64 centimetres (25 in) has been reported for a male, and the heaviest published weighed 3 kilograms (6.6 lb).

They are broadly described as having a body of "golden-green shining color", but a more precise source states that young fish are golden-bronze but darken with maturity, until they gain a dark green back, deep bronze upper flanks, and gold on the lower flanks and belly, and reddish or orange fins, although other colour variations exist. One distinguishing characteristic is a convexly rounded fin, as opposed to goldfish (or C. gibelio) hybrids which have concave fins.

The crucian carp is also the type species for the genus, which has led to confusion in the taxonomy of species native to East Asia.

There are reports of hybridisation between the crucian and domestic or feral goldfish, which has been verified by production of viable hybrids in laboratory conditions. Although the hybrids thus produced were sterile or nearly so, genetic contamination of the native population has been raised as a concern; even if the hybrids cannot continue to propagate, the F1 hybrids exhibit hybrid vigour or heterosis, being much more adept at finding food and evading predators than either of their parents, which has been proposed to constitute a possible threat to the native crucian carp population.

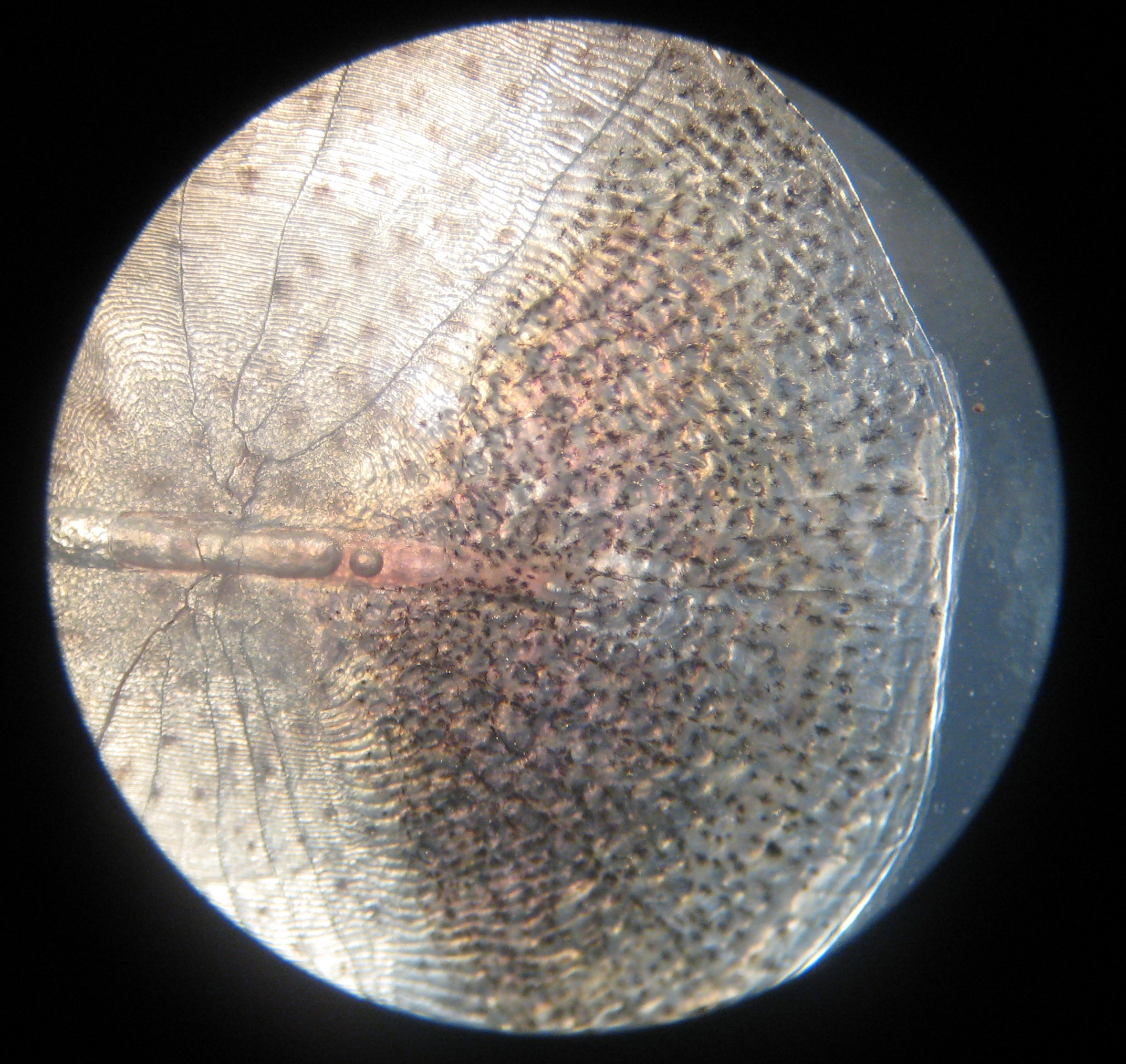
Scale

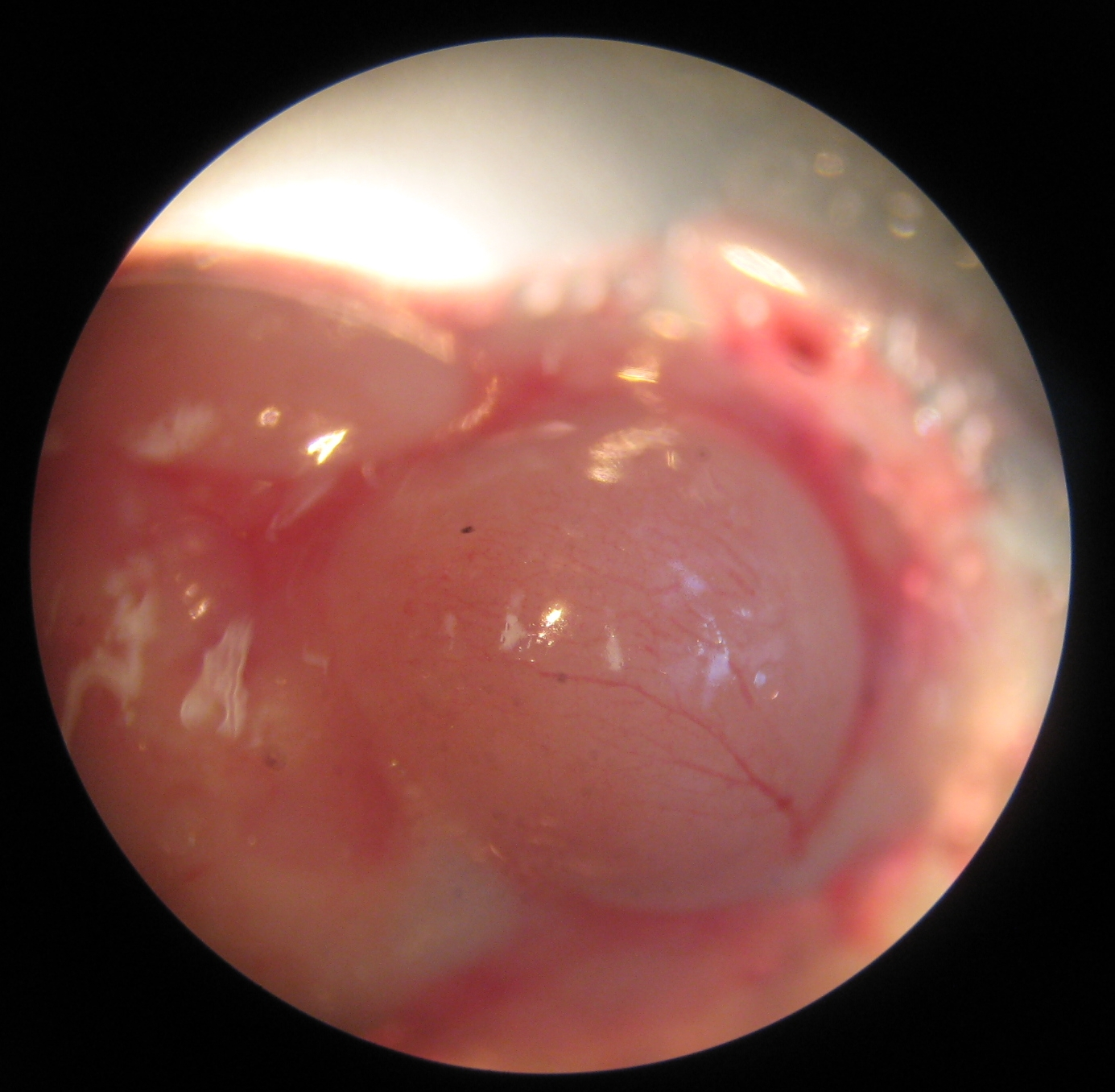
Brain

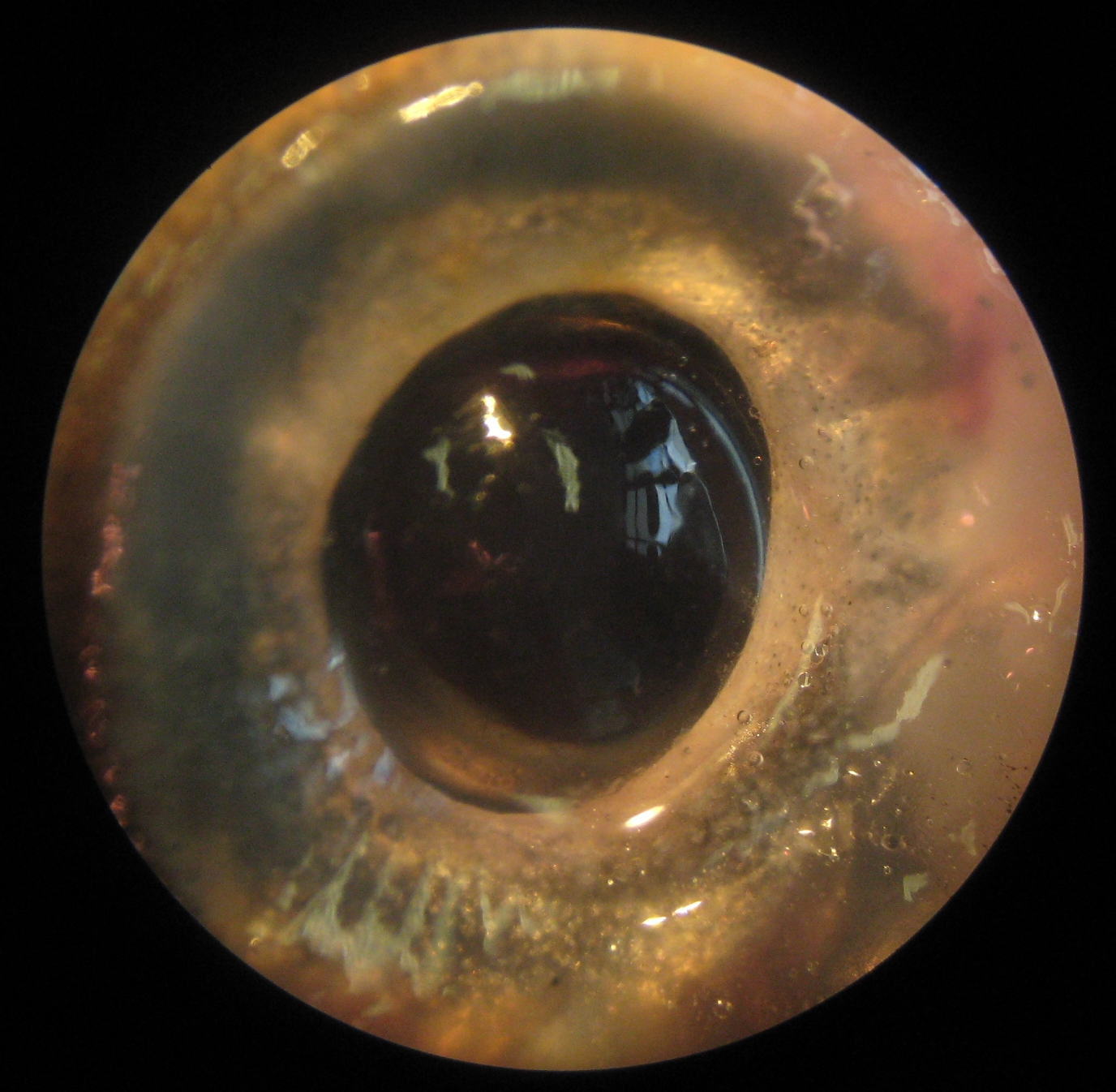
Eye

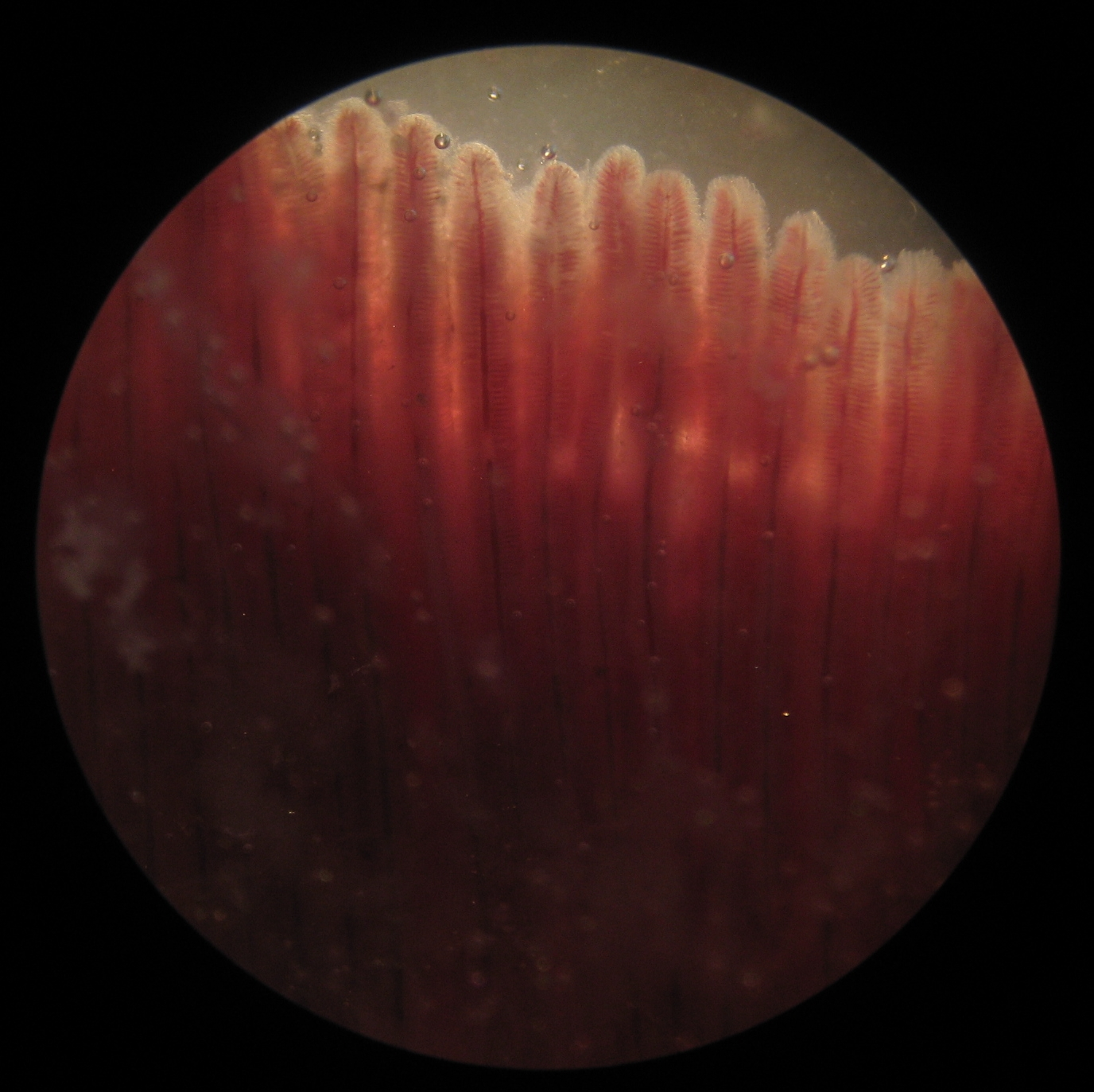
Gills

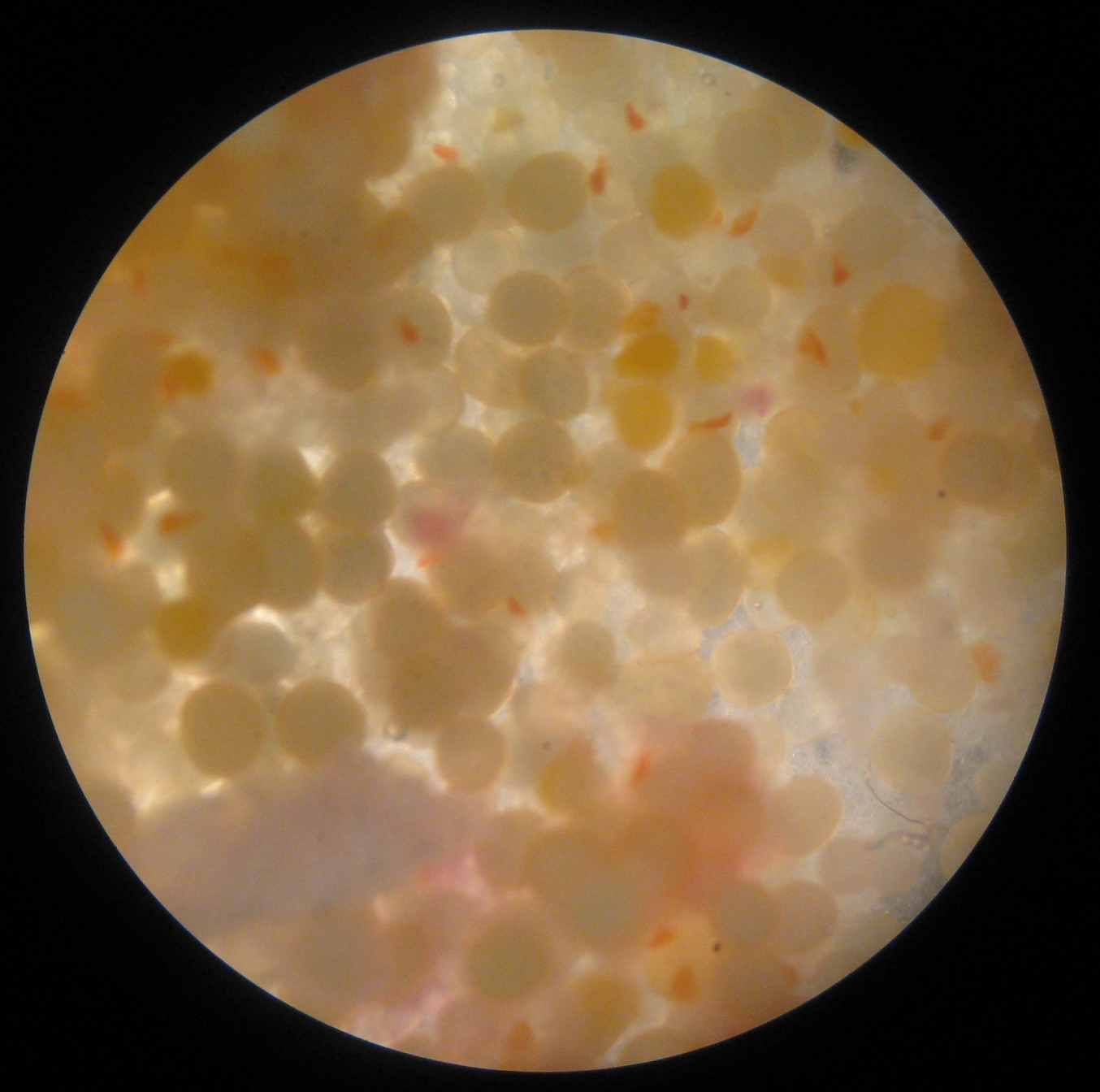
Eggs

== Predator defenses ==
The variation in shape of a crucian carp can be very high. When cohabiting waters where predatory fish are present, there occurs an induced change in the morphology of the population from a sleek-bodied form to a deep-bodied form, which makes it difficult for predator fish to fit the crucian carp within its jaws. However, because the deep-bodied morph is not permanent, it is expected that the trait might have some survivability trade-offs in the absence of predators. Notably, the deep-bodied morph is associated with compromised immune function and resource allocation. Specifically, deep-bodied crucian carp have a lower level of baseline natural antibodies relative to the sleeker-bodied morphs. In addition, crucian carp with the deep-bodied morphology exhibit reduced growth rates when compared to their sleeker-bodied counterparts.

== Physiology ==
Carassius species exhibit some remarkable physiological adaptations to their environment. For example, in entirely anoxic conditions during winter C. carassius can survive for considerable periods in oxygen-depleted waters by ethanol fermentation, a facility that is highly unusual among vertebrates. It is believed this adaptation evolved over millions of years, when in winter, surface ice covers a pond or lake, sealing off exposure to atmospheric oxygen, surviving fish adapting the traits through natural selection.

During summer the fish also may survive anaerobic conditions by this metabolic expedient, though only to a far more limited extent; the winter phenotype can sustain fermentation as a substitute for respiration for several weeks on end. Experimentally the fish have been maintained under anoxic conditions for 140 days. Anoxia can be tolerated longest in the coldest water, even down to 0 °C, because colder conditions lower the metabolic rate. Alcohol production occurs mainly in the muscle tissues, but also in the liver, where the process is thought to have originated. Similarly goldfish can produce alcohol in muscle tissues, but to a much more limited extent.

Experimentally it has been demonstrated that the metabolic process involves the production of pyruvate from lactate, followed by decarboxylation to acetaldehyde which then is hydrogenated to ethanol as the major metabolic end product. In turn the fish largely excretes the ethanol into the water rather than accumulating it to toxic levels in the tissues. Excretion of lactate in significant quantities is not a common nor a desirable metabolic facility, but the excretion of ethanol presents no serious metabolic challenges. This metabolic expedient avoids the fatal accumulation of acid end-products of anaerobic glycolysis.

== Sport fishing ==
In Britain, leisurely or competitive catching of this fish by rod and tackle belongs in the coarse fishing category. The British rod-caught record for largest crucian is 4 lb 14.0 oz (2.212 kg) landed by Adam Broodbanks on 30 October 2024 at Barham Syndicate, Suffolk. This beat the previous British record, a fish of 4 lb 12 oz (2.155 kg) captured by Julian Barnes on 3 May 2021 at Johnsons Lake, Milford, Godalming, Surrey. Various bids for the record have been rejected as not "true" crucians" but rather, e.g. a "brown goldfish variant" (i.e., hybrid born between the non-native goldfish or gibelo species and the British crucian). In the Netherlands, a typical crucian specimen of 54 cm, weighing 3 kg has been caught and photographed.

== Relation to goldfish ==
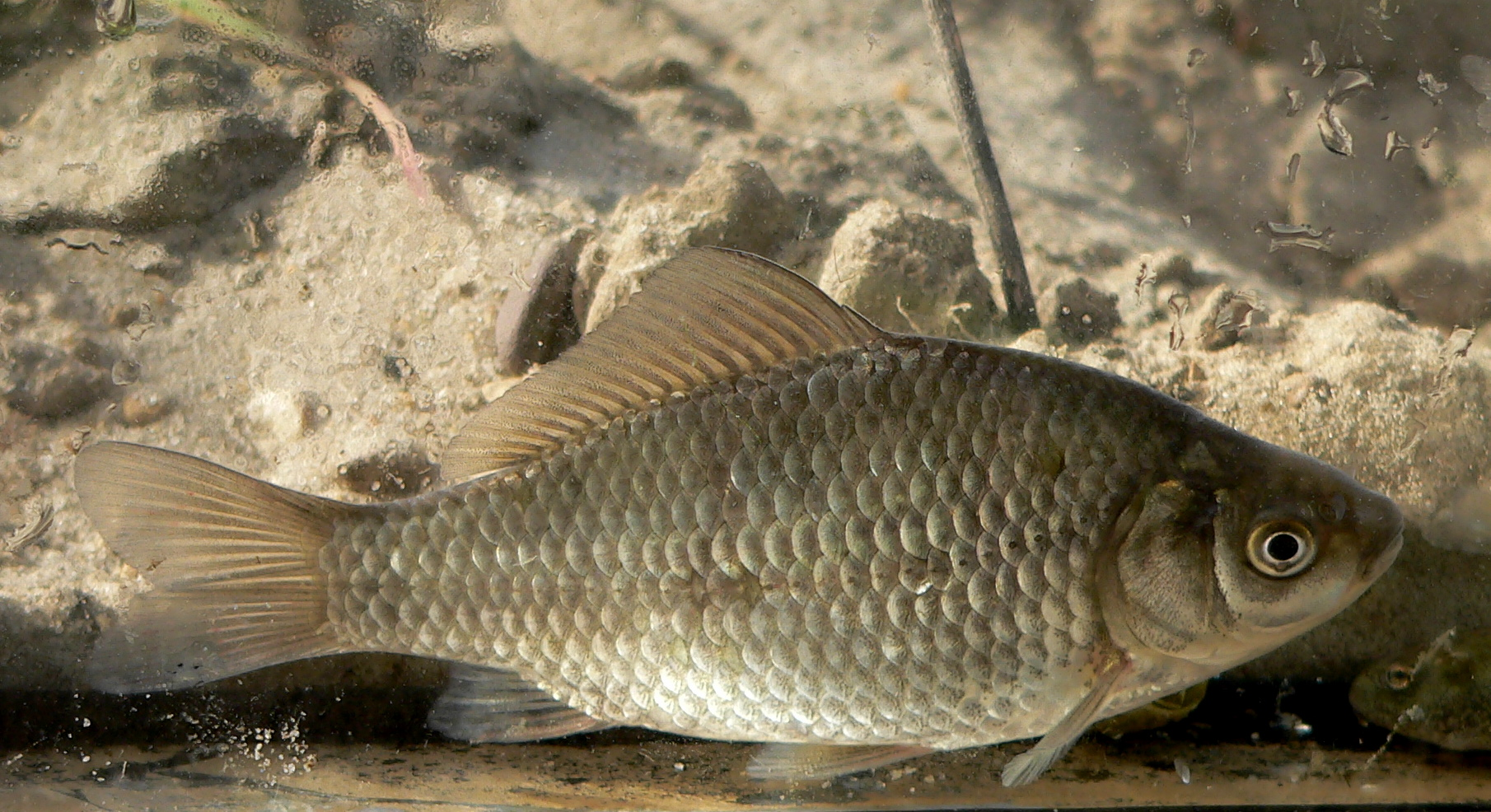
Prussian carp Carassius gibelio as comparison

Some sources state that the goldfish (Carassius auratus) is a cultivated breed of crucian carp taken from the wild.

Aside from confusion in nomenclature, there is the practical issue of distinguishing true crucian carp from goldfish hybrids in, e.g., competitive coarse fishing. The following is based on a similar table of guidelines constructed by the Farnham Angling Society:

Crucian carp (C. carassius)	Goldfish (C. auratus)
a) snout well rounded	a) more pointed snout
b) Always golden bronze	b) Can be golden bronze, often has a grey/greenish colour
c) 33+ scales along lateral line (33; 31–36 scales)	c) 31 or fewer scales on lateral line (27–31)
d) Juveniles have a black spot at the base of the tail, which disappears with age. ("transient dark marking on the caudal peduncle")	d) This tail spot is never present.
e) The leading ray of the dorsal fin is weak	e) The leading ray of the dorsal fin is strong
f) The dorsal fin is higher for longer and convex in shape	f) The dorsal fin is concave in shape
g) caudal fin bluntly lobed	g) caudal fin deeply forked and sharp

== Use ==
These carp are also occasionally kept as freshwater aquarium fish, as well as in water gardens, although they are not commonly available commercially, mainly because they are not in particularly high demand due to the presence of more colourful fish such as the koi or orfe. Crucian carp are considered a vital part of the pond ecosystem as they possess an ability to clean up the excrement of other organisms, thus preventing nitrogen overload.

It has been suggested that this is a heavily farmed fish worldwide; FAO's newest statistics from 2008 (pub. 2011) show total production C. crassius at 1,957,337 tonnes, worth US$2,135,857,000, ranked 9th in worldwide in aquaculture, including marine fish and crustaceans, however these statistics treat the Asian C. gibelio carp as a subspecies of the European crucian carp, and it is evident that the greater bulk of this number is from the Asian fish farmed in China.

In terms of freshwater catches of C. crassius (read Carassius spp.), FAO's 2006 statistics show 5.53 thousand tons harvested, which ranked 13th worldwide among freshwater fishes caught. The breakdown was Kazakhstan 2.2, Japan 1.12, Serbia 0.84, Moldova 0.19, Uzbekistan 0.19, Poland 0.13. In these figures, the tonnage from European countries may represent C. crassius in some part.

In Poland, crucian carp (Polish: karaś) is considered the best-tasting pan fish, and traditionally served with sour cream (karasie w śmietanie). King's carp (previously Galician carp as in Galicia in the Austro-Hungarian Empire) is the breed of carp created in Poland; the "hump" is bigger than average and the scales are larger than average. Carp is included amongst the holiday foods in Poland. The tradition might have Jewish origins.

In Russia, this particular species is called Золотой карась meaning "golden crucian", and is one of the fish used in a borscht recipe called borshch s karasey (Борщ с карасе́й) or borshch s karasyami (Борщ с карася́ми). Another classic Russian recipe is fried crucians in sour cream. The variety of lake Nedzheli is highly appreciated in Yakutia and has been introduced to other lakes in the region.
