= List of governors of Kyoto Prefecture =

Governor of Kyoto
- 京都府知事
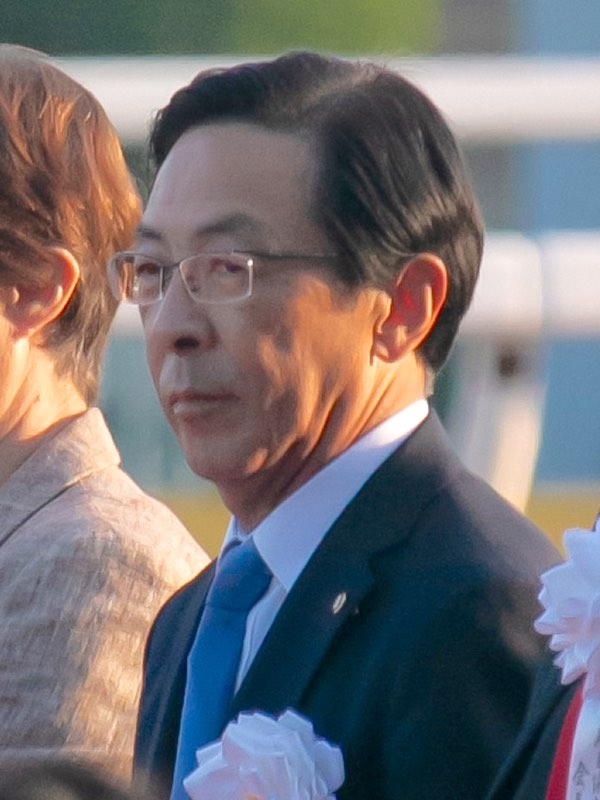
- Incumbent; Takatoshi Nishiwaki since April 16, 2018
- Type: Governor (Japan)
- Status: Head of government
- Abbreviation: Governor of Kyoto Prefecture
- Term length: Four years, no term limits
- Constituting instrument: Local Autonomy Act Article 139
- Inaugural holder: Nobuatsu Nagatani
- Formation: June 15, 1868 (158 years ago)
- Deputy: Vice Governor of Kyoto Prefecture
- Salary: ¥1,188,640 per month (2020)
- Website: www.pref.kyoto.jp/en/greeting.html

The governor of Kyoto, officially Governor of Kyoto Prefecture, is the chief executive of Kyoto, a prefecture in Japan. It serves from 1868 and comes from Kyoto machi-bugyō. The governors were appointed by the Home Ministry until 1947. The current governor is Takatoshi Nishiwaki, who was inaugurated on April 16, 2018.

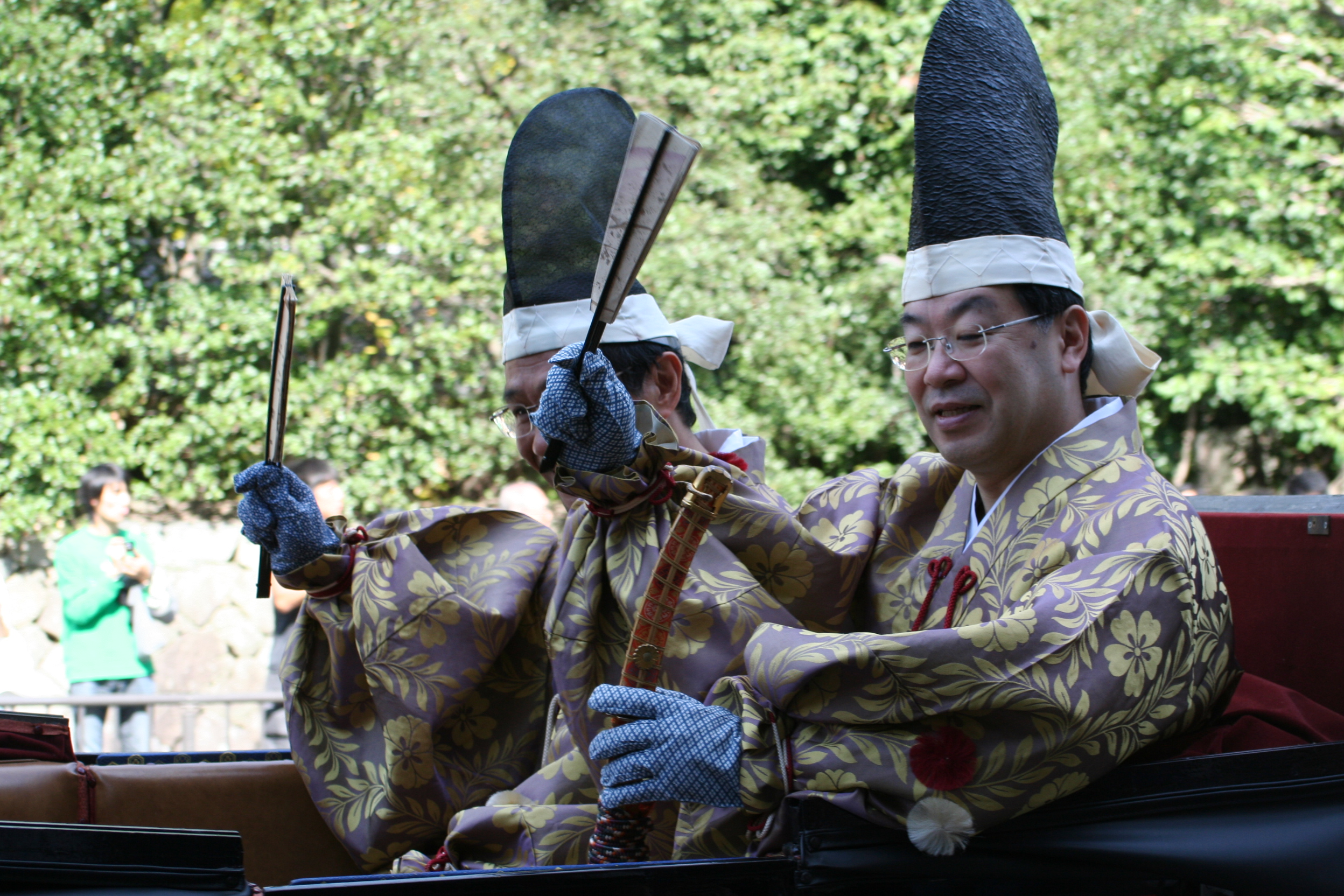
Governor at costume procession of Jidai Matsuri in 2009

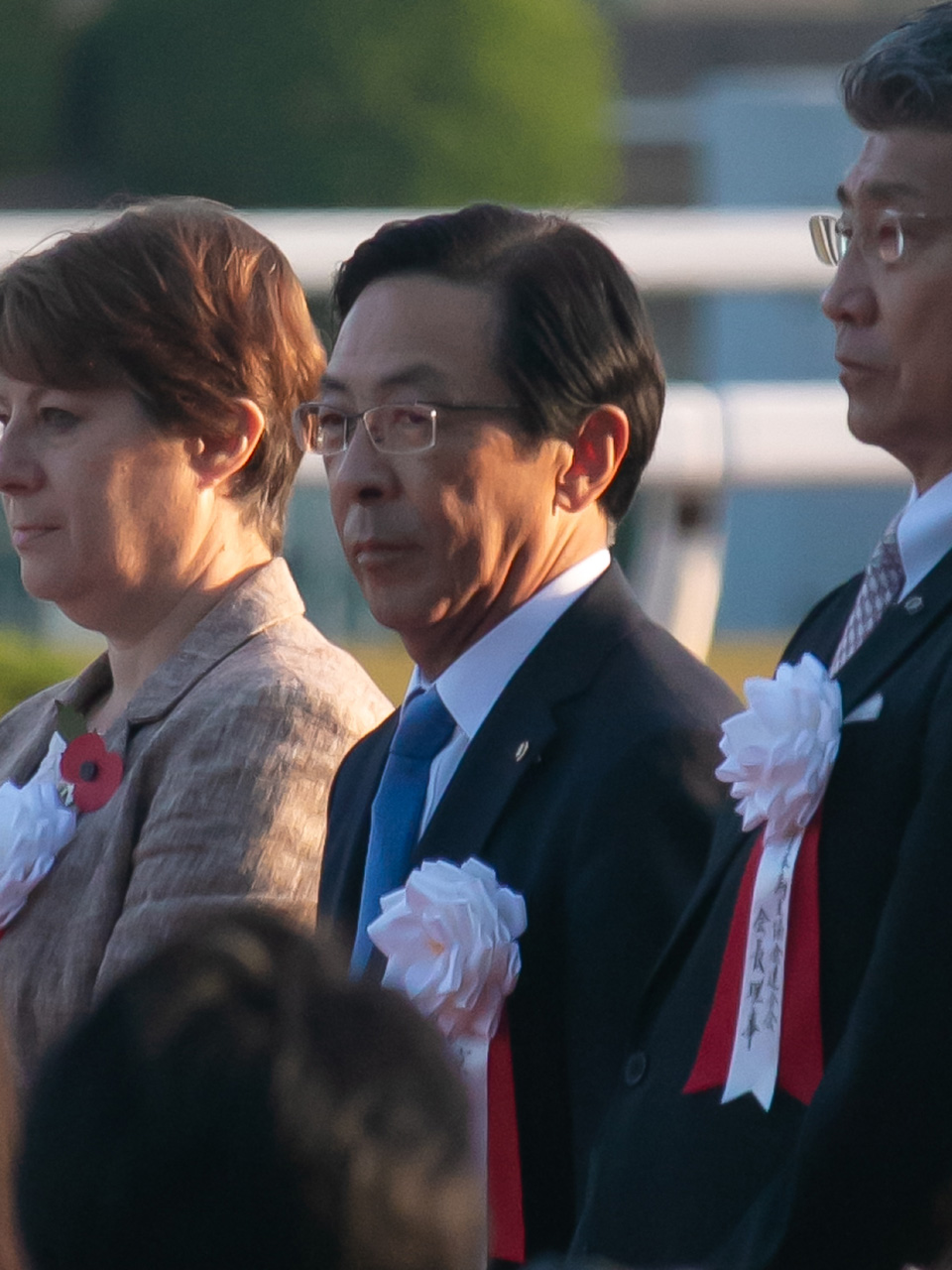
Governor at the Queen Elizabeth II Cup horse race

== Appointed governors, 1868–1947 ==
Governors of Kyoto Prefecture
No.	Portrait	Name	Term of office		
No.	Portrait	Name	Took office	Left office	Time in office
1		Nobuatsu Nagatani	June 1868	July 1875	7 years, 1 month
2		Masanao Makimura	July 1875	January 1881	5 years, 6 months
3		Kunimichi Kitagaki	January 1881	July 1892	11 years, 6 months
4		Sadaaki Senda	July 1892	November 1893	1 year, 4 months
5		Hiroshi Nakai	November 1893	October 1894	11 months
6		Chiaki Watanabe	October 1894	October 1895	1 year
7		Nobumichi Yamada	October 1895	November 1897	2 years, 1 month
8		Tadakatsu Utsumi	November 1897	March 1900	2 years, 4 months
9		Chikaaki Takasaki	March 1900	February 1902	1 year, 11 months
10		Shoichi Omori	February 1902	April 1916	14 years, 2 months
11		Jūshirō Kiuchi	April 1916	May 1918	2 years, 1 month
12		Eitaro Mabuchi	May 1918	July 1921	3 years, 2 months
13		Raizo Wakabayashi	July 1921	October 1922	1 year, 3 months
14		Tokikazu Ikematsu	October 1922	December 1924	2 years, 2 months
15		Hiroshi Ikeda	December 1924	September 1926	1 year, 9 months
16		Tsunenosuke Hamada	September 1926	April 1927	7 months
17		Shigoro Sugiyama	April 1927	July 1927	3 months
18		Shigeyoshi Omihara	July 1927	July 1929	2 years
19		Shin'ichi Sagami	July 1929	October 1931	2 years, 3 months
20		Shinya Kurosaki	October 1931	December 1931	2 months
21		Sukenari Yokoyama	December 1931	June 1932	6 months
22		Munenori Saito	June 1932	January 1935	2 years, 7 months
23		Shintarō Suzuki	January 1935	April 1936	1 year, 3 months
24		Keiichi Suzuki	April 1936	April 1939	3 years
25		Kotora Akamatsu	April 1939	April 1940	1 year
26		Jitsuzo Kawanishi	April 1940	January 1941	9 months
27		Kyoushiro Ando	January 1941	July 1943	2 years, 6 months
28		Chiyoji Yukizawa	July 1943	April 1944	9 months
29		Zentaro Arai	April 1944	June 1945	1 year, 2 months
30		Shigeo Miyoshi	June 1945	October 1945	4 months
31		Atsushi Kimura	October 1945	March 1947	1 year, 5 months
32		Yoshiaki Yamamoto	March 1947	April 1947	1 month

== Elected governors, 1947–present ==
Governors of Kyoto Prefecture
No.	Portrait	Name	Term of office			Election
No.	Portrait	Name	Took office	Left office	Time in office	Election
33		Atsushi Kimura (木村惇)	April 12, 1947	April 2, 1950	2 years, 355 days	1947
34		Torazo Ninagawa (蜷川虎三)	April 20, 1950	April 15, 1978	27 years, 360 days	1950
35		Torazo Ninagawa (蜷川虎三)	April 20, 1950	April 15, 1978	27 years, 360 days	1954
36		Torazo Ninagawa (蜷川虎三)	April 20, 1950	April 15, 1978	27 years, 360 days	1958
37		Torazo Ninagawa (蜷川虎三)	April 20, 1950	April 15, 1978	27 years, 360 days	1962
38		Torazo Ninagawa (蜷川虎三)	April 20, 1950	April 15, 1978	27 years, 360 days	1966
39		Torazo Ninagawa (蜷川虎三)	April 20, 1950	April 15, 1978	27 years, 360 days	1970
40		Torazo Ninagawa (蜷川虎三)	April 20, 1950	April 15, 1978	27 years, 360 days	1974
41		Yukio Hayashida (林田悠紀夫)	April 16, 1978	April 15, 1986	7 years, 364 days	1978
42		Yukio Hayashida (林田悠紀夫)	April 16, 1978	April 15, 1986	7 years, 364 days	1982
43		Teiichi Aramaki (荒巻禎一)	April 16, 1986	April 15, 2002	15 years, 364 days	1986
44		Teiichi Aramaki (荒巻禎一)	April 16, 1986	April 15, 2002	15 years, 364 days	1990
45		Teiichi Aramaki (荒巻禎一)	April 16, 1986	April 15, 2002	15 years, 364 days	1994
46		Teiichi Aramaki (荒巻禎一)	April 16, 1986	April 15, 2002	15 years, 364 days	1998
47		Keiji Yamada (山田啓二)	April 16, 2002	April 15, 2018	15 years, 364 days	2002
48		Keiji Yamada (山田啓二)	April 16, 2002	April 15, 2018	15 years, 364 days	2006
49		Keiji Yamada (山田啓二)	April 16, 2002	April 15, 2018	15 years, 364 days	2010
50		Keiji Yamada (山田啓二)	April 16, 2002	April 15, 2018	15 years, 364 days	2014
51		Takatoshi Nishiwaki (西脇隆俊)	April 16, 2018		8 years, 144 days	2018
52		Takatoshi Nishiwaki (西脇隆俊)	April 16, 2018		8 years, 144 days	2022
53		Takatoshi Nishiwaki (西脇隆俊)	April 16, 2018		8 years, 144 days	2026
