= 2018 Kyoto gubernatorial election =

Japanese gubernatorial election

- 8 April 2018
- Turnout: 35.17% ▲0.72%
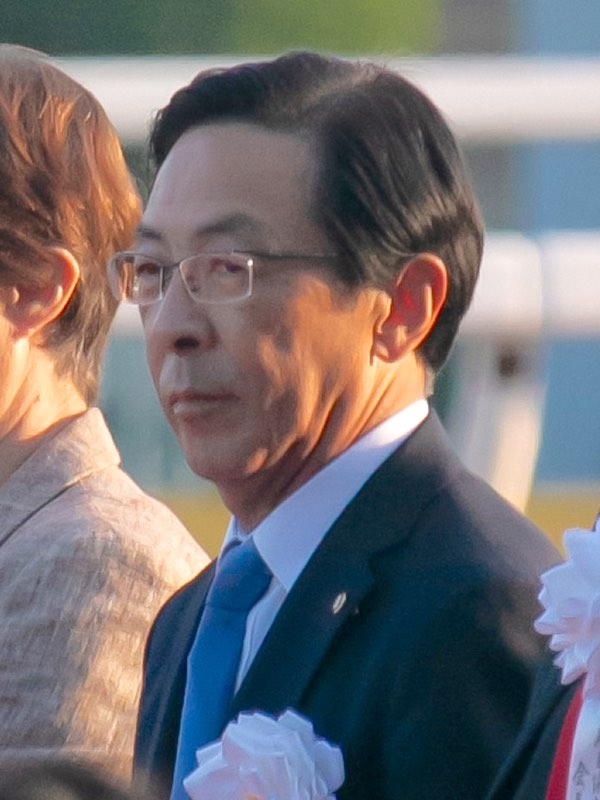

Candidate	Takatoshi Nishiwaki	Kazuhito Fukuyama
Party	Independent	Independent
Popular vote	402,672	317,617
Percentage	55.90%	44.10%
Supported by	LDP, Komeito, DP, CDP, Kibo	JCP
Governor before election
Keiji Yamada
Independent
Elected Governor
Takatoshi Nishiwaki
Independent

The 2018 Kyoto gubernatorial election was held on 8 April 2018 to elect the next governor of Kyoto. Incumbent Governor Keiji Yamada declared that he was not running for a fifth consecutive term, ending his 16-year tenure in office. This is the first gubernatorial election in Kyoto since the voting age was lowered to 18.

Former bureaucrat Takatoshi Nishiwaki won the election by 55.9% to 44.1% against Kazuhito Fukuyama, amidst the second-lowest ever turnout in a Kyoto gubernatorial election. Nishiwaki vowed to continue the policies of Governor Yamada.

== Candidates ==
=== Running ===
- Takatoshi Nishiwaki, former undersecretary for the Reconstruction Agency. (endorsed by LDP, Komeito, DP, CDP, Kibo no To)
- Kazuhito Fukuyama, former deputy chairman of the Kyoto Bar Association. (endorsed by JCP)

=== Declined ===
- Keiji Yamada, incumbent governor.

== Results ==
Kyoto gubernatorial election, 2018
Party	Candidate	Votes	%	±%
Independent	Takatoshi Nishiwaki	402,672	55.90	
Independent	Kazuhito Fukuyama	317,617	44.10	
Total valid votes		720,289	97.86	
Rejected ballots		15,742	2.14	
Turnout		736,031	35.17	▲0.72
Registered electors		2,092,500		

=== Breakdown ===
Division	Subdivision										
Division	Subdivision	Nishiwaki Independent		Fukuyama Independent		Valid votes		Invalid votes		Turnout	
Division	Subdivision	Votes	%	Votes	%	Votes	%	Votes	%	Total	%
Cities	Kyoto	195,196	53.53	169,441	46.47	364,637	97.73	8,459	2.27	373,115	32.29
Cities	Kita-ku	16,534	52.10	15,199	47.90	31,733	97.83	703	2.17	32,436	35.38
Cities	Kamigyō-ku	12,236	53.38	10,600	46.42	22,836	97.67	544	2.33	23,380	36.99
Cities	Sakyō-ku	21,449	47.16	24,030	52.84	45,479	97.84	1,006	2.16	46,485	37.15
Cities	Nakagyō-ku	15,155	51.75	14,131	48.25	29,286	97.59	722	0.41	30,008	34.30
Cities	Higashiyama-ku	5,286	55.48	4,241	44.52	9,527	97.79	215	2.21	9,742	32.12
Cities	Yamashina-ku	17,293	54.49	14,445	45.51	31,738	97.77	723	2.23	32,461	30.03
Cities	Shimogyō-ku	11,438	58.64	8,069	41.36	19,507	97.76	447	2.24	19,954	31.16
Cities	Minami-ku	11,566	51.79	10,766	48.21	22,332	97.93	473	2.07	22,805	28.82
Cities	Ukyō-ku	27,829	53.47	24,221	46.53	52,050	97.90	1,117	2.10	53,167	33.07
Cities	Nishikyō-ku	20,688	54.35	17,374	45.65	38,062	97.87	829	2.13	38,891	31.91
Cities	Fushimi-ku	35,722	57.54	26,365	42.46	62,087	97.33	1,700	2.67	63,787	28.52
Cities	Fukuchiyama	15,120	57.67	11,098	42.33	26,218	97.72	611	2.28	26,829	41.67
Cities	Maizuru	16,904	61.59	10,540	38.41	27,444	98.01	557	1.99	28,001	41.22
Cities	Ayabe	7,200	60.88	4,627	39.12	11,827	98.39	170	1.61	11,997	42.07
Cities	Uji	27,152	53.68	23,430	46.32	50,582	98.32	864	1.68	51,446	33.57
Cities	Miyazu	4,581	62.01	2,806	37.99	7,387	98.39	121	1.61	7,508	47.79
Cities	Kameoka	16,070	52.38	9,691	37.62	25,761	98.01	522	1.99	26,283	35.61
Cities	Jōyō	12,456	58.17	8,957	41.83	21,413	98.49	328	1.51	21,741	33.87
Cities	Mukō	8,108	53.29	7,106	46.71	15,214	98.04	304	1.96	15,518	33.54
Cities	Yawata	10,071	54.22	8,503	45.78	18,574	98.03	374	1.97	18,948	32.13
Cities	Kyōtanabe	10,790	57.52	7,968	42.48	18,758	97.95	392	2.05	19,150	35.31
Cities	Kyōtango	12,639	58.33	9,028	41.67	21,667	98.19	400	2.81	22,067	47.17
Cities	Nantan	9,780	60.91	6,277	39.09	16,057	97.41	427	2.59	16,484	60.81
Cities	Kizugawa	11,728	59.03	8,141	40.97	19,869	97.90	427	2.10	20,296	34.02
Towns and villages	Otokuni District	2,765	55.08	2,255	44.92	5,020	97.93	106	2.07	5,126	39.57
Towns and villages	Ōyamazaki	2,765	55.08	2,255	44.92	5,020	97.93	106	2.07	5,126	39.57
Towns and villages	Kuse District	2,981	64.93	1,610	35.07	4,591	98.79	56	2.21	4,647	35.83
Towns and villages	Kumiyama	2,981	64.93	1,610	35.07	4,591	98.79	56	2.21	4,647	35.83
Towns and villages	Tsuzuki District	5,207	67.14	2,549	32.86	7,756	97.77	177	2.23	7,933	56.19
Towns and villages	Ide	2,840	66.12	1,455	33.88	4,295	97.24	122	2.76	4,417	68.69
Towns and villages	Ujitawara	2,367	68.39	1,094	31.61	3,461	98.44	55	1.56	3,516	45.74
Towns and villages	Sōraku District	9,146	60.09	6,074	39.91	15,220	98.10	295	1.90	15,515	41.60
Towns and villages	Kasagi	389	59.75	262	40.25	651	98.04	13	1.96	664	51.43
Towns and villages	Wazuka	1,543	69.95	663	30.05	2,206	98.13	42	1.87	2,248	62.51
Towns and villages	Seika	6,297	57.53	4,649	42.47	10,946	98.09	213	1.91	11,159	37.36
Towns and villages	Minamiyamashiro	917	64.71	500	35.29	1,417	98.13	27	1.87	1,444	56.87
Towns and villages	Yosa District	7,839	58.18	5,634	41.82	13,473	96.16	538	3.84	14,011	68.21
Towns and villages	Ine	799	63.67	456	36.33	1,255	98.51	19	1.49	1,274	66.88
Towns and villages	Yosano	7,040	57.62	5,178	42.38	12,218	95.93	519	4.07	12,737	68.34
Total		402,672	55.90	317,617	44.10	720,289	97.86	15,742	2.14	736,031	35.17
Source: Results Turnout
