= List of cities in Fukui Prefecture by population =

The following list sorts all cities (including towns and villages) in the Japanese prefecture of Fukui with a population of more than 5,000 according to the 2020 Census. As of October 1, 2020, 16 places fulfill this criterion and are listed here. This list refers only to the population of individual cities, towns and villages within their defined limits, which does not include other municipalities or suburban areas within urban agglomerations.

== List ==
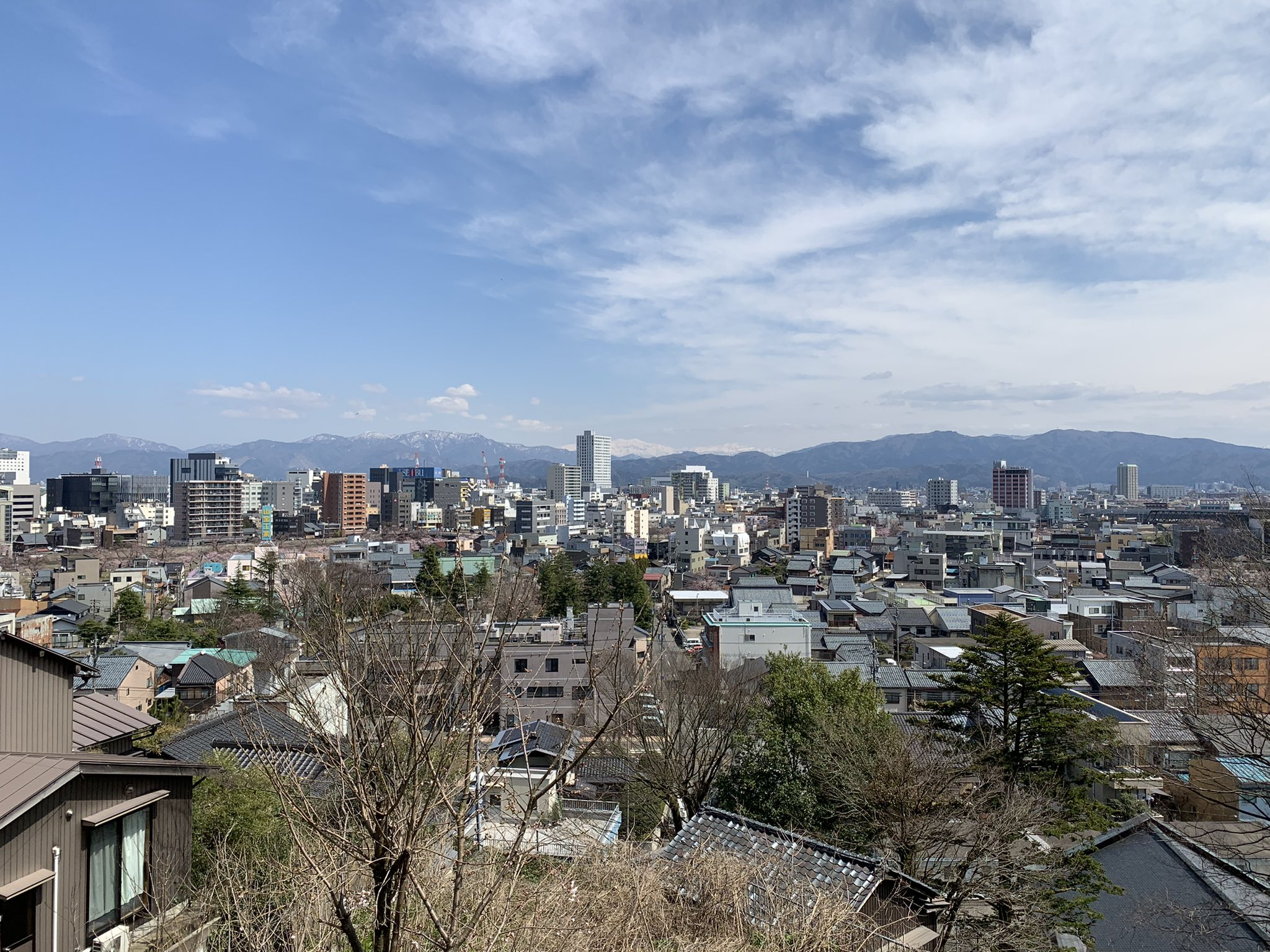
01.Fukui

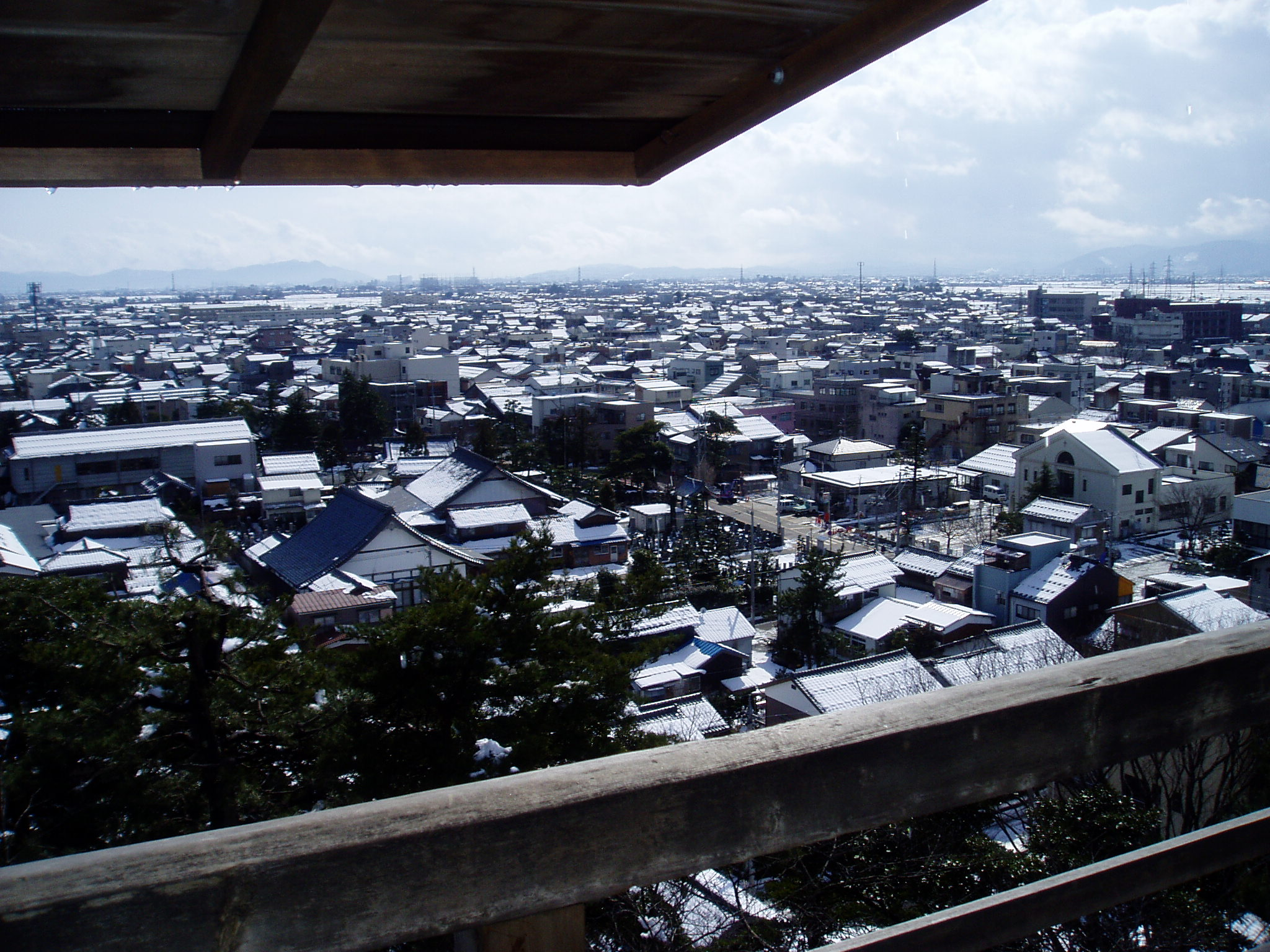
02.Sakai

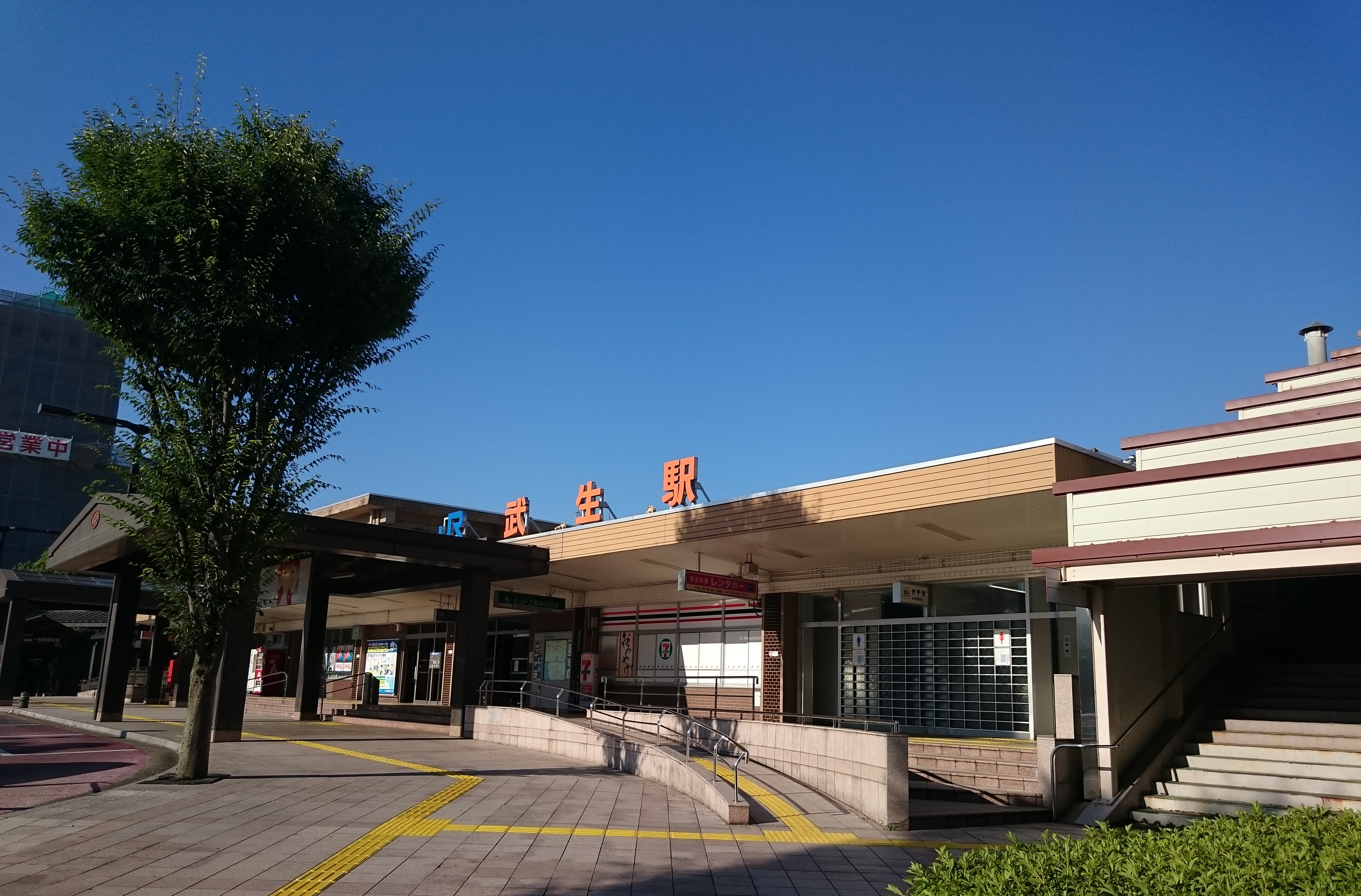
03.Echizen

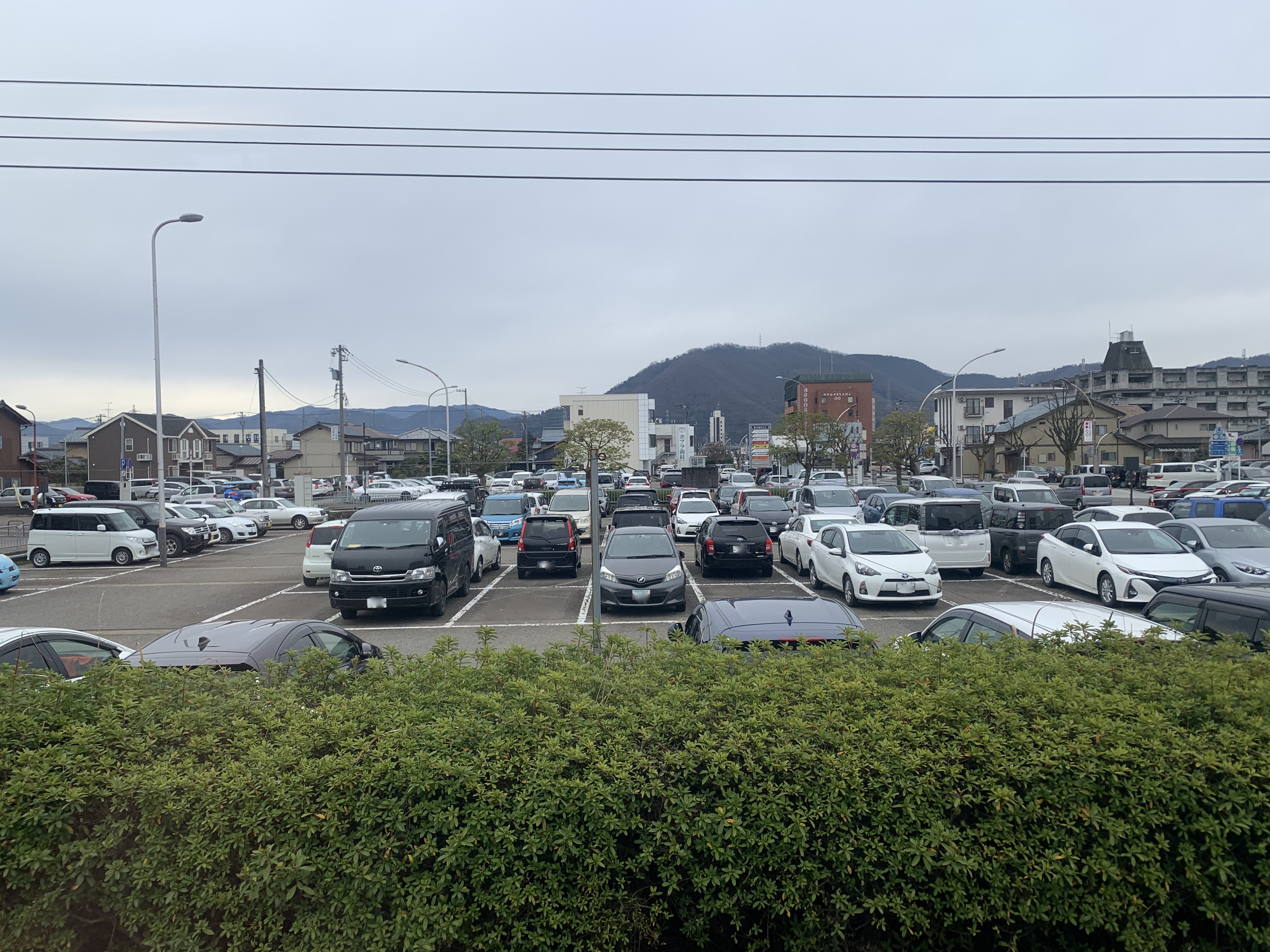
04.Sabae

The following table lists the 16 cities, towns and villages with a population of at least 5,000 on October 1, 2020, according to the 2020 Census. The table also gives an overview of the evolution of the population since the 1995 census.

Rank (2015)	Name	Status	2020	2015	2010	2005	2000	1995
1	Fukui	City	262,501	265,904	266,796	269,144	269,557	272,970
2	Sakai	City	88,533	90,280	91,900	92,318	91,173	86,870
3	Echizen	City	80,667	81,524	85,614	87,742	87,699	85,533
4	Sabae	City	68,363	68,284	67,450	66,831	64,898	62,890
5	Tsuruga	City	64,302	66,165	67,760	68,402	68,145	67,204
6	Ōno	City	31,324	33,109	35,291	37,843	39,632	41,069
7	Obama	City	29,019	29,670	31,340	32,182	33,295	33,496
8	Awara	City	27,539	28,729	29,989	31,081	32,178	32,432
9	Katsuyama	City	22,180	24,125	25,466	26,961	28,143	29,162
10	Echizen	Town	20,126	21,538	23,160	23,995	25,017	25,158
11	Eiheiji	Town	18,980	19,883	20,647	20,764	21,182	20,183
12	Wakasa	Town	14,019	15,257	16,099	16,780	17,313	17,567
13	Takahama	Town	10,332	10,596	11,062	11,630	12,119	12,201
14	Minamiechizen	Town	10,009	10,799	11,551	12,274	13,221	13,616
15	Mihama	Town	9,202	9,914	10,563	11,023	11,630	12,362
16	Ōi	Town	7,913	8,325	8,580	9,217	9,983	10,251
