= Ōi Nuclear Power Plant =

Nuclear power plant in Fukui Prefecture, Japan

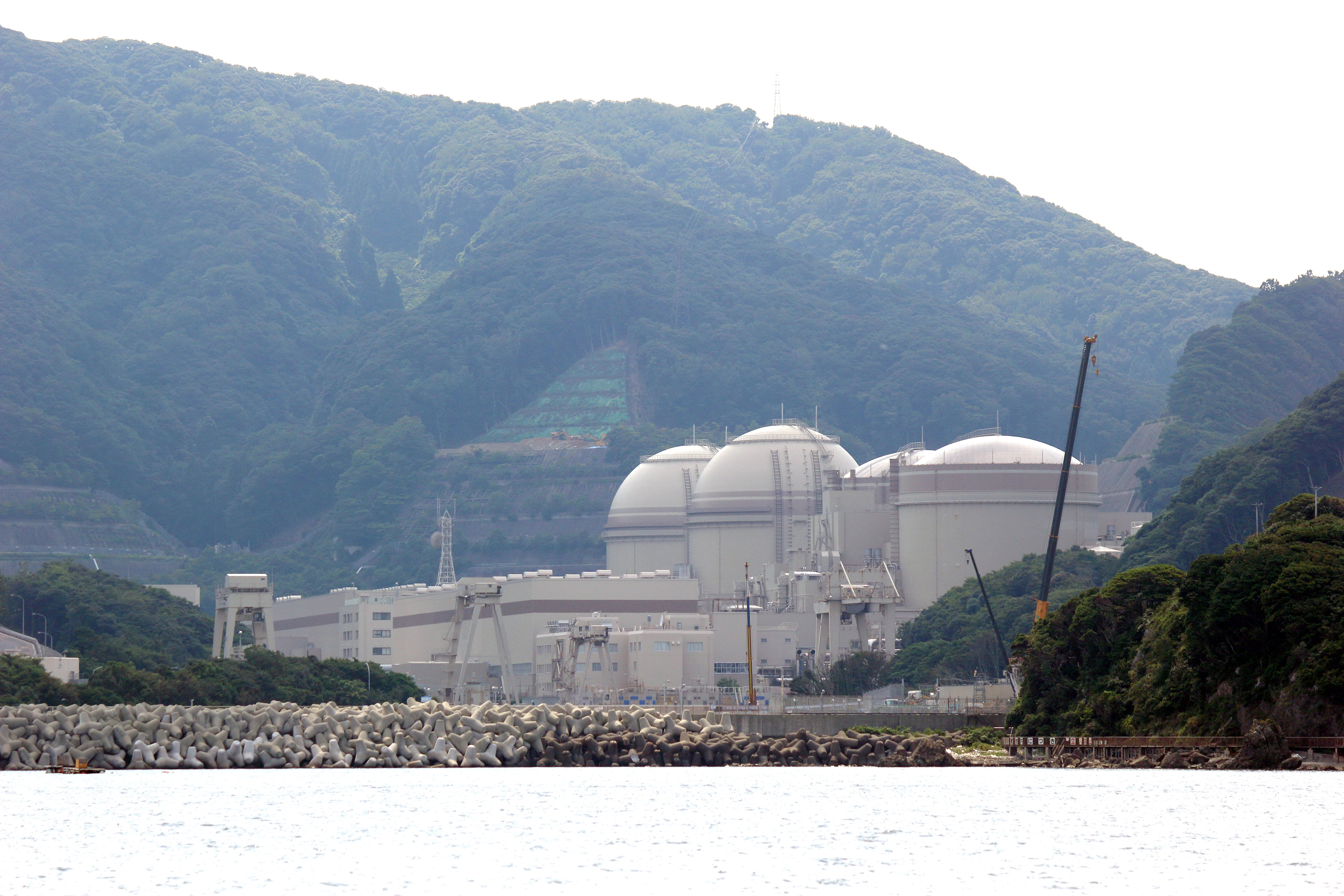
- Country: Japan
- Location: Ōi, Fukui Prefecture
- Coordinates: 35°32′26.25″N 135°39′7.32″E
- Status: Operational
- Construction began: Unit 1: 26 October 1972; Unit 2: 8 December 1972; Unit 3: 3 October 1987; Unit 4: 13 June 1988
- Commission date: Unit 1: 27 March 1979; Unit 2: 5 December 1979; Unit 3: 18 December 1991; Unit 4: 2 February 1993
- Owner: Kansai Electric Power Company
- Operator: Kansai Electric Power Company

Nuclear power station
- Reactor type: PWR
- Reactor supplier: Units 1–2: Westinghouse; Units 3–4: MHI
- Cooling source: Sea of Japan
- Cogeneration?: Yes (desalination)
- Thermal capacity: 2 × 3423 MW_{th}

Power generation
- Units operational: 2 × 1127 MW
- Make and model: Units 1–2: WH 4-loop Units 3–4: M (4-loop)
- Units decommissioned: 2 × 1120 MW
- Nameplate capacity: 2254 MW
- Capacity factor: 0%
- Annual net output: 0 GW·h

External links
- Website: www.kepco.co.jp/wakasa/ooi/ooi.html
- Commons: Related media on Commons

The Ōi Nuclear Power Plant (大飯発電所, Ōi hatsudensho; Ōi power plant), also known as Oi or Ohi, is a nuclear power plant located in the town of Ōi, Fukui Prefecture, managed by the Kansai Electric Power Company. The site is 1.88 square kilometers (460 acres). Ōi Units 3 and 4 were taken offline in September 2013. In December 2017 Kansai Electric Power announced that it will decommission reactors no. 1 and 2 because of their age and the difficulty of making safety upgrades within their small containment vessels. Unit 3 was restarted on 14 March 2018, and unit 4 was restarted on 9 May 2018.

== Reactors on site ==
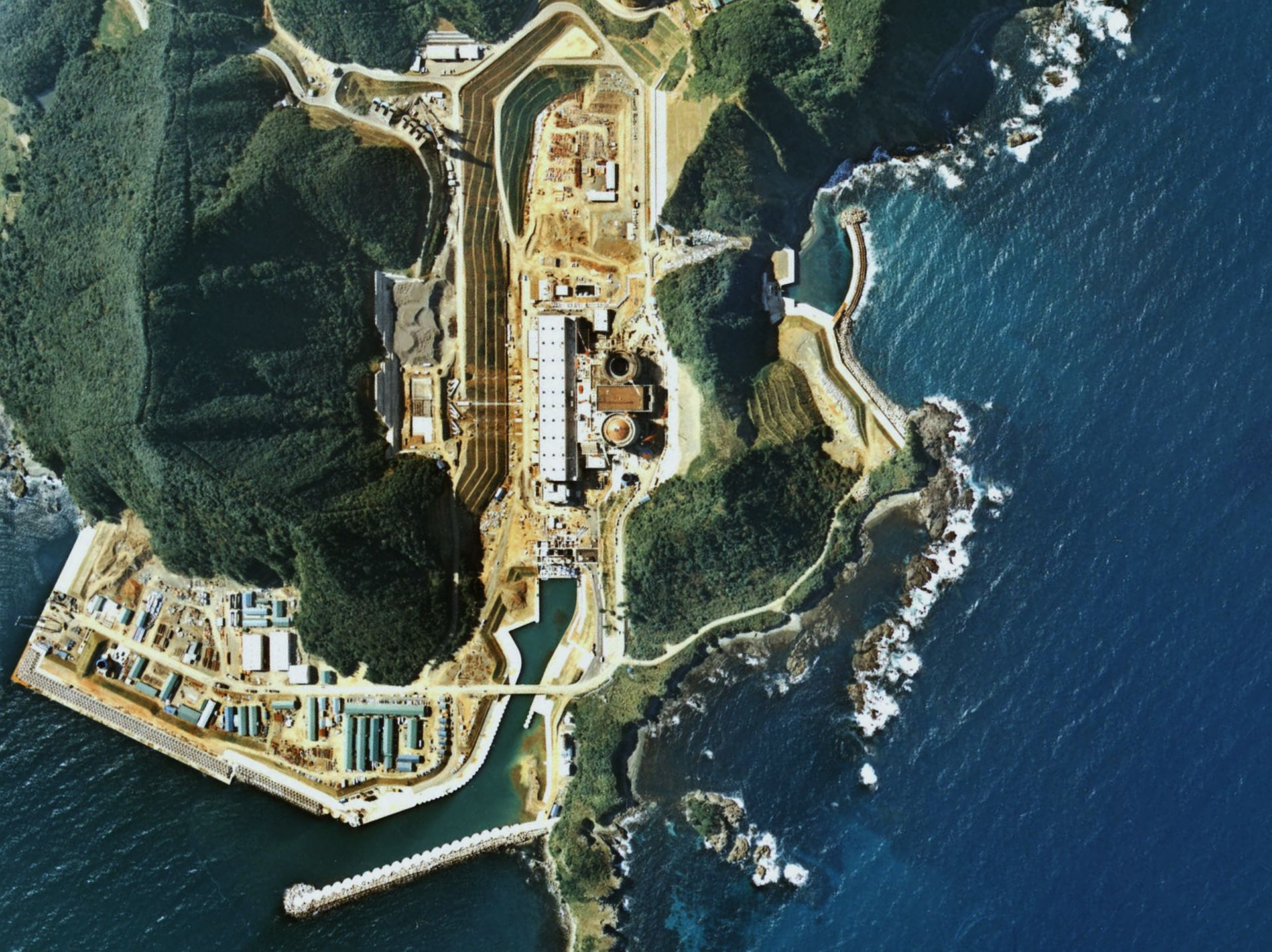
Aerial view of the 1 and 2 units during construction

| Unit | Type | Commercial Operation | Electric Power |
|---|---|---|---|
| Ōi – 1 | PWR | 27 March 1979 | 1,175 MW |
| Ōi – 2 | PWR | 5 December 1979 | 1,175 MW |
| Ōi – 3 | PWR | 18 December 1991 | 1,180 MW |
| Ōi – 4 | PWR | 2 February 1993 | 1,180 MW |

The closure of Ōi-1 and Ōi-2 was formally announced in December 2017. They had not been operated since 2011.

== History ==
=== Stress tests ===
On 16 December 2011 Kansai Electric Power Company halted the No.2 reactor for a 4-month safety check following the Fukushima nuclear accident. The results of the stress-tests of reactor no. 3 and no. 4 were approved after a meeting on 9 February 2012 of a panel of nuclear experts. The report said that the tests on the reactors were conducted appropriately and measures for earthquakes and tsunami were in place at the plant.

=== Local opposition ===
Local governments of Fukui prefecture and the town Ōi were still very cautious about restarting the reactors and they urged the central government to create new safety standards based on the lessons learned after the Fukushima disaster. In August 2011 citizens of Shiga prefecture started a lawsuit at the Otsu District Court, and asked a court order to prevent the restart of seven reactors operated by Kansai Electric Power Company in Fukui prefecture.

On 29 March 2012 the governor Keiji Yamada of Kyoto said to the Japanese Nuclear and Industrial Safety Agency (NISA) that the prefecture would not accept the restart of reactor 3 and 4 at the Ōi nuclear power plant. Officials of the agency did visit Kyoto, to explain that the stress tests on the two idled reactors were approved. The governor of Shiga Yukiko Kada, who was visited later for a likewise explanation, reacted in a similar way: she asked for no hasty decisions. Although the approval of local governments was not legally required, prime minister Noda had made it clear that the participation of the local communities would be taken into account.

=== Safety improvements and restart ===
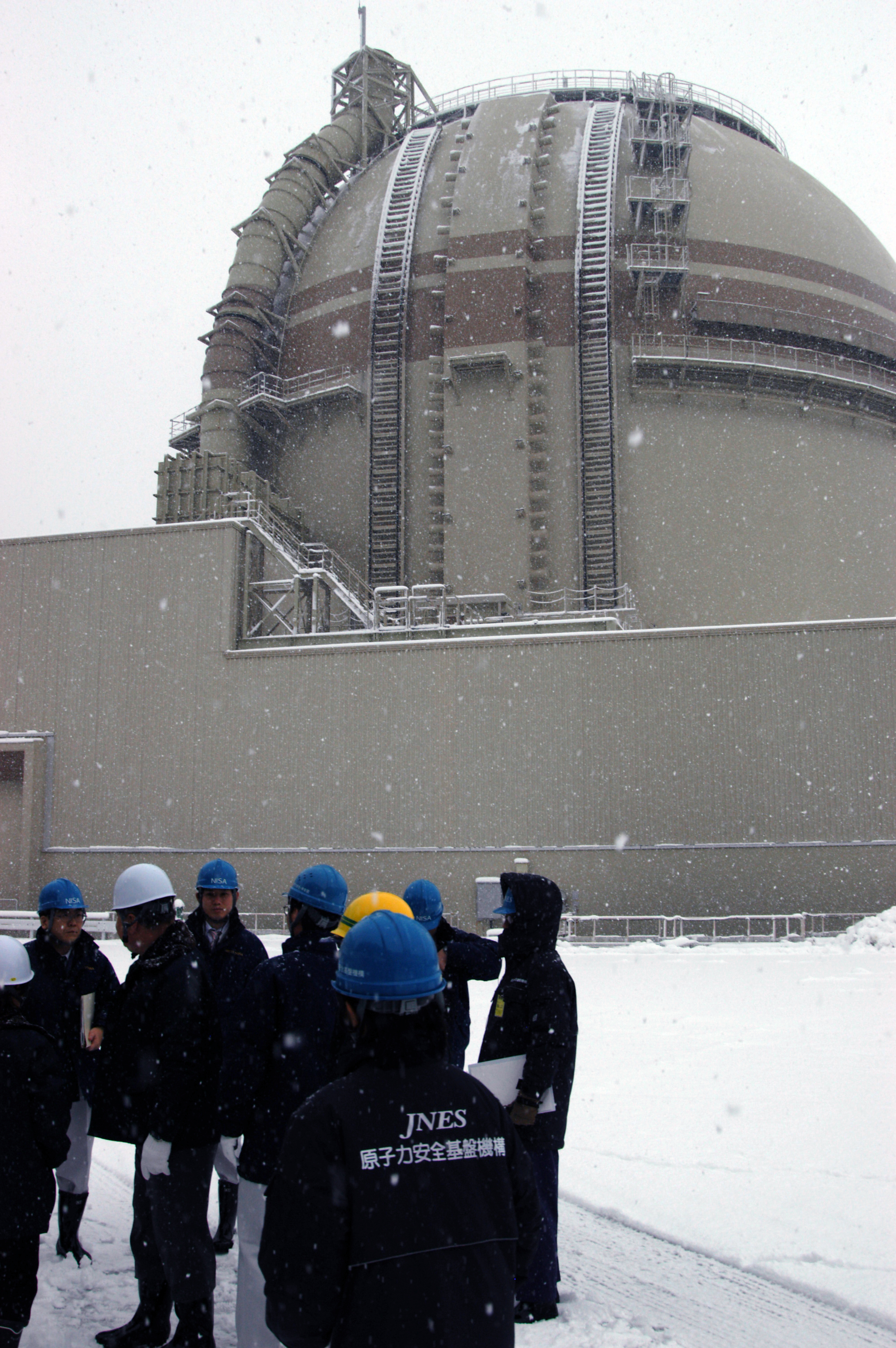
Japanese officials and IAEA team members discuss safety measures outside Unit 3 of Japan's Ōi Nuclear Power Plant in January 2012

To improve the safety at the plant an action plan was designed with a total of 91 possible measures. On 9 April 2012 of this only 54 were already implemented: the earthquake resistance of the power transmission towers was improved, satellite telephone communication was installed, seawater could be taken in to cool the systems. But an earthquake-resistant office building was not to be completed before April 2015. Until that time the assembly room close to the central control room would act as emergency-management office. Because this place offers only accommodation for some 50 people, experts had doubts about this place. Venting systems to release steam from the containment with filters to remove radioactive isotopes were planned to be built in 2015. The dam that would offer better protection against tsunamis was to be finished around March 2014.

On 13 April 2012 at a meeting of the Japanese government the stress-tests of two reactors of the Ōi nuclear plant and the safety action plan submitted by KEPCO were approved satisfactory and conform safety standards. To prevent the rise of electricity charges and an estimated power shortage of 18% in the summer of 2012 the two reactors needed to be restarted. Industry minister Yukio Edano said, that the 2 reactors were safe enough to be restarted and there was a need for their resumption.

On 14 May 2012 Oi assembly approved the restart of the reactors. The assembly made the decision in consideration of the economic damage that a prolonged suspension could cause and conveyed its view to Oi Mayor Shinobu Tokioka later in the day. The mayor was set to make a decision on whether to approve the restarts after reflecting on the assembly's conclusion and the results of the appraisal made by Fukui's nuclear safety commission and other matters. Reactor no. 3 was restarted on 1 July and reached criticality on 2 July 2012. Power generation at reactor no. 4 started on 21 July.

In September 2012 the city and prefecture of Osaka requested that both units 3 and 4 be shut down, stating that the power was not needed.

On 29 October 2012 Kansai Electric Power Co. announced in an interim report that the F-6 fault running north–south between the plant's Nos. 1–2 reactors and Nos. 3–4 reactors was found to be not active. Digging and boring surveys gave no indication of danger.

=== Shutdown ===
On 19 March 2013 the NRA announced that it would check the power plant on the site according to the new safety standards, before their introduction in July 2013, in order to keep the plant in operation. When no problems were found, than continued operation until September would be authorized by the NRA. After this date the reactors needed their routine maintenance. The NRA expected that the No. 3 and 4 reactors at the Oi plant would be able to clear most of the new safety standards, because countermeasures were in place. But the NRA intended to do a close examination.

In the first weeks of June 2013 a team of inspectors, including NRA Commissioner Toyoshi Fuketa, examined the two operating reactors. On 3 July 2013 the NRA allowed the plant to keep the two operating reactors on line, although on 8 July new safety requirements for atomic plants would take effect. The NRA saw no serious problems at that moment. After September because of the mandatory routine checks the reactors would be taken offline. To resume operations, the reactors needed to comply with the new requirements, including the absence of active faults under the plant. Half July the outcome of the latest trench survey was expected.

The Kansai Electric Power Company's Unit 3 at the Ohi nuclear power plant in Japan was shut down on 3 September 2013. On 14 September 2013, the day before the no. 4 Oi reactor was scheduled to close down for regular inspections, some 9000 demonstrators gathered at the Kameido Chuo Park and later marched close to JR Kinshicho Station and the Tokyo Skytree. They called for an end of Japan's dependency on nuclear power. The day after the Oi-reactor closed down, leaving Japan without any nuclear power for the third time in 40 years.

In May 2014 the Fukui District ruled that it will not allow the restart of the Ōi-3 and Ōi-4 reactors.

=== Restart ===
In December 2017 Kansai Electric Power announced that it will decommission Ōi-1 and Ōi-2 because of their age and the difficulty of making safety upgrades within their small containment vessels. Unit 3 was restarted on 14 March 2018. Unit 4 was restarted on 9 May 2018.

== See also ==
- List of nuclear power plants in Japan
