= Obama Domain Battery Sites =

Obama Domain Battery
- 小浜藩台場跡 (Japanese)
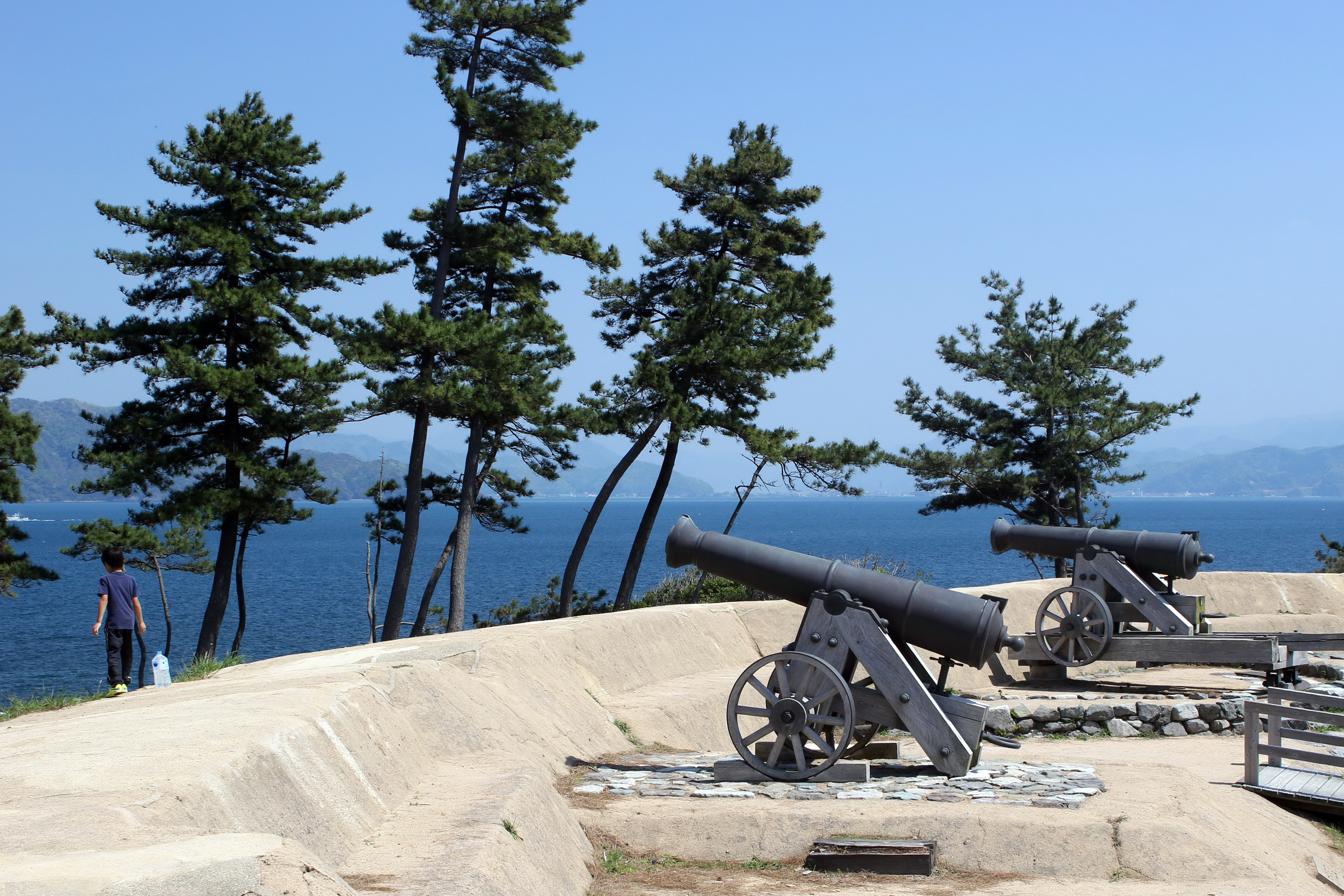
- Obama Domain Battery Site (Matsugase)

- Location within Fukui Prefecture Location within Japan
- 35°31′58.12″N 135°39′58.36″E (Matsugase)
- Type: fortification
- Location: Obama, Fukui, Japan

History
- Built: 1851
- Demolished: 1871
- National Historic Site of Japan

The Obama Domain Battery (小浜藩台場跡, Obama-han Hōdai-ato) was a series of 30 Bakumatsu period coastal artillery battery sites erected by Obama Domain on the Sea of Japan coast along what is now the coasts of the city of Obama and town of Ōi in the Hokuriku region of northern Japan. The ruins of these fortifications were collectively designated a National Historic Site in 2001.

== Background ==
In the late Edo period, the Tokugawa shogunate was increasing alarmed by incursions by foreign ships into Japanese territorial waters, fearing that these kurofune warships of the United States or other Western powers would attempt the end Japanese self-imposed national isolation policy by force, or would attempt an invasion of Japan by landing hostile military forces. Numerous feudal domains were ordered to establish fortifications along their coastlines with shore artillery located at strategic locations. The most powerful daimyō of Echizen Domain, Matsudaira Yoshinaga was at the time a hard-line supporter of the sonnō jōi movement, and quickly responded by 26 cannons in several batteries along his coastline in 1848. In neighboring Wakasa Province, the Sakai clan of Obama Domain was quick to emulate this example, completing these batteries in 1854, the year after the arrival of the Perry Expedition at Uraga.

=== Matsugase Battery ===
The Matsugase Battery (松ヶ瀬台場) was a pair of batteries at the entrance to Obama Bay intended to defend the port against a possible attack. Matsugase No.1 Battery faced the entrance to the bay, and had five cannons in a row, behind an earthen rampart which extended for 50 meters. The rampart was in the form of a redan with an open back. The rampart had openings for five cannon. Matsugase No.1 Battery faced the Sea of Japan, and had a bow-shaped earthen rampart with a height of 2.2–2.4 metres (7.2–7.9 ft), faced with stone on its inner and side surfaces, extending for 80 meters. The rampart was also in the form of a redan with an open back. The rampart had an opening for one cannon, which was mounted on a swivel mount, and two square turrets for fixed cannons on either side. At the ends of both earthworks are traces of an ammunition depot. The site is located within the grounds of a public campground, and replica cannon have been installed.

=== Nokogirizaki Battery ===
The site of the Nokogirizaki Battery (鋸崎台場跡) 35°32′48.14″N 135°39′42.95″E was discovered in 1994 and was added to the National Historic Site listing in 2004. It consists of five box-shaped ramparts with open rears, surrounding two box-shaped ramparts in the centre. As the site is within the grounds of the Ōi Nuclear Power Plant, public access is prohibited.

=== Kawasaki Battery ===
The Kawasaki Battery (川崎台場跡) 35°30′1.4″N 135°44′30.1″E was built in 1854 and consists of seven locations in the inner bay close to Obama Castle, with mountings for a total of 55 cannon.

== Gallery ==
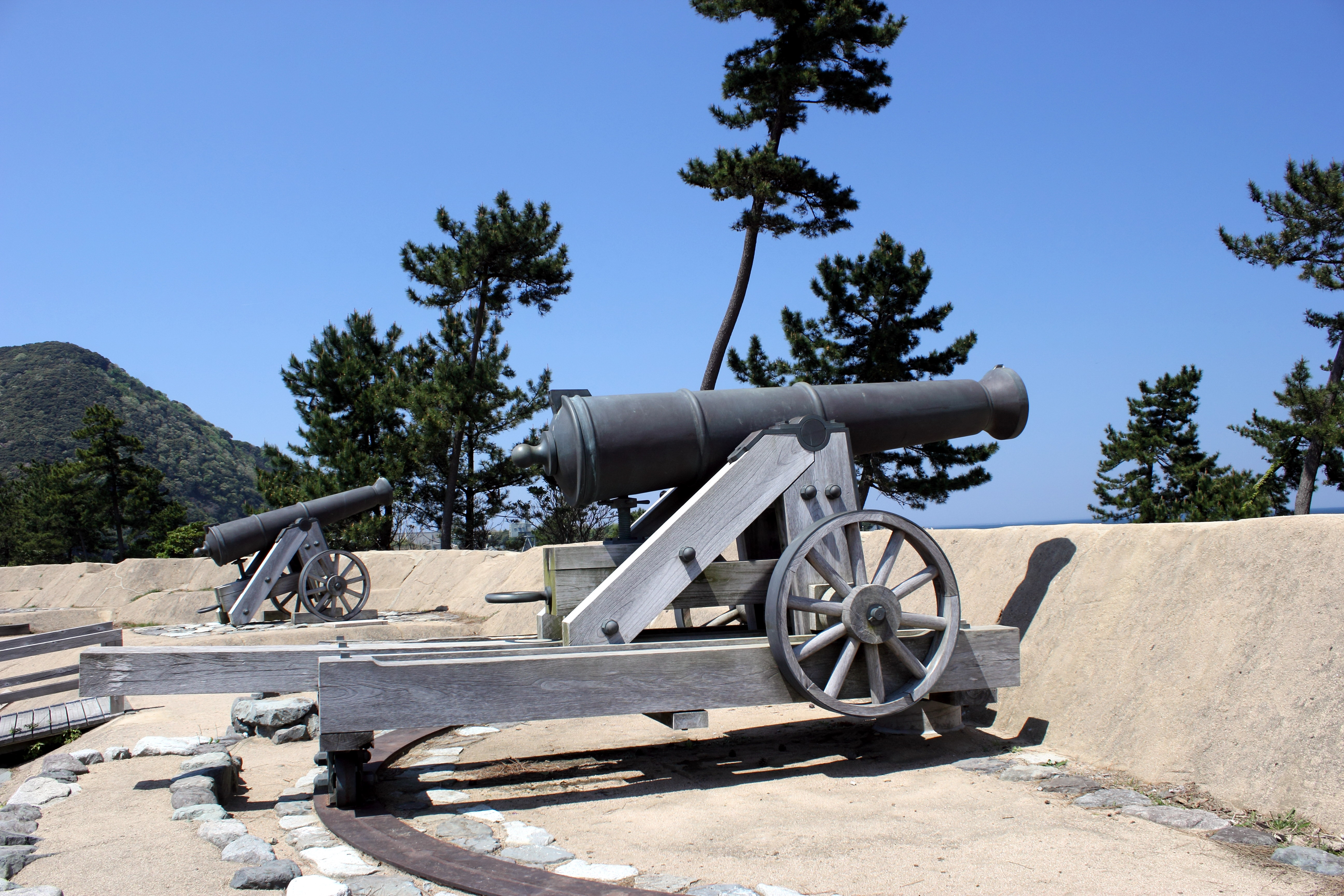
replica cannon at the Matsugase No.2 Battery

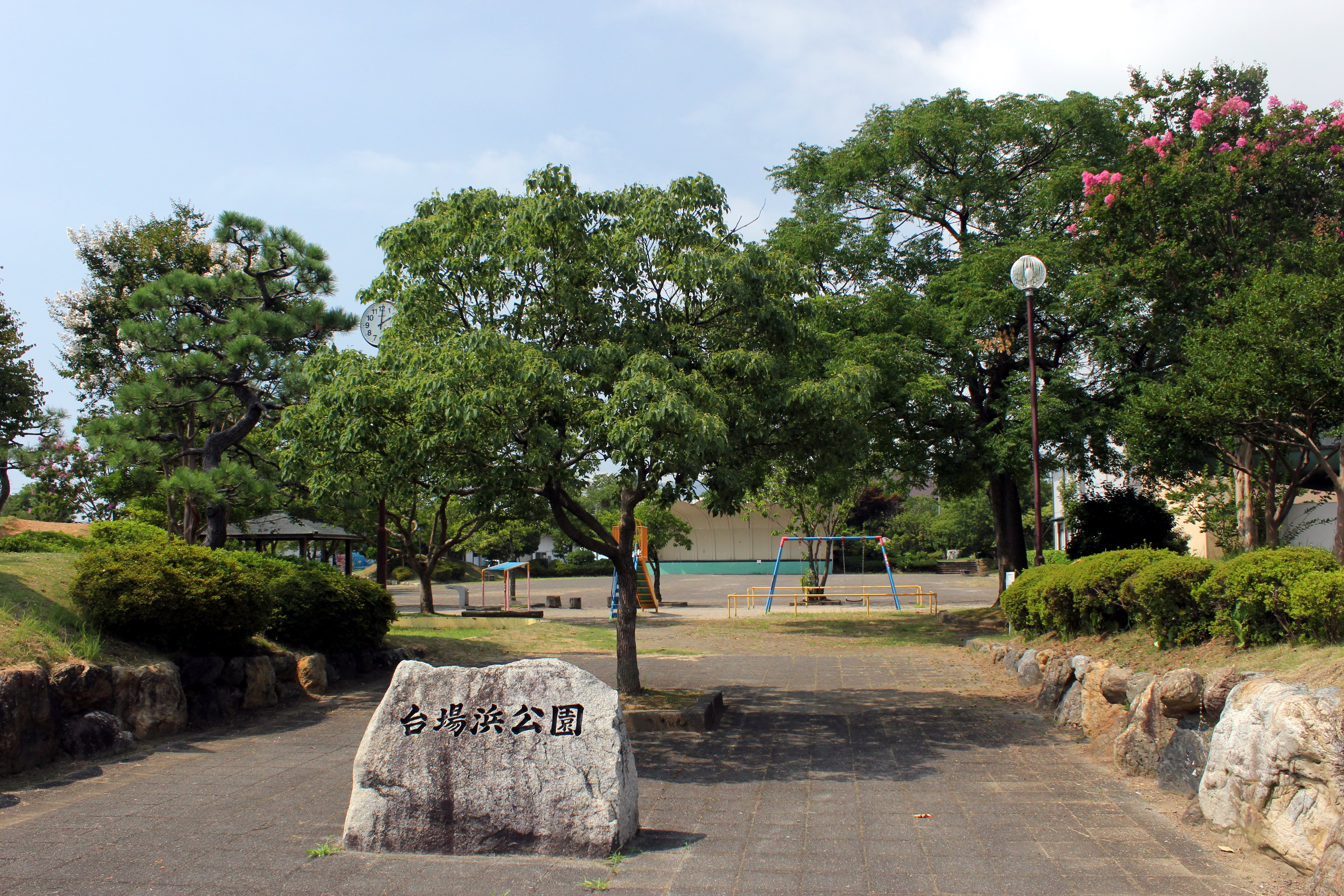
Site of the Kawasaki Battery

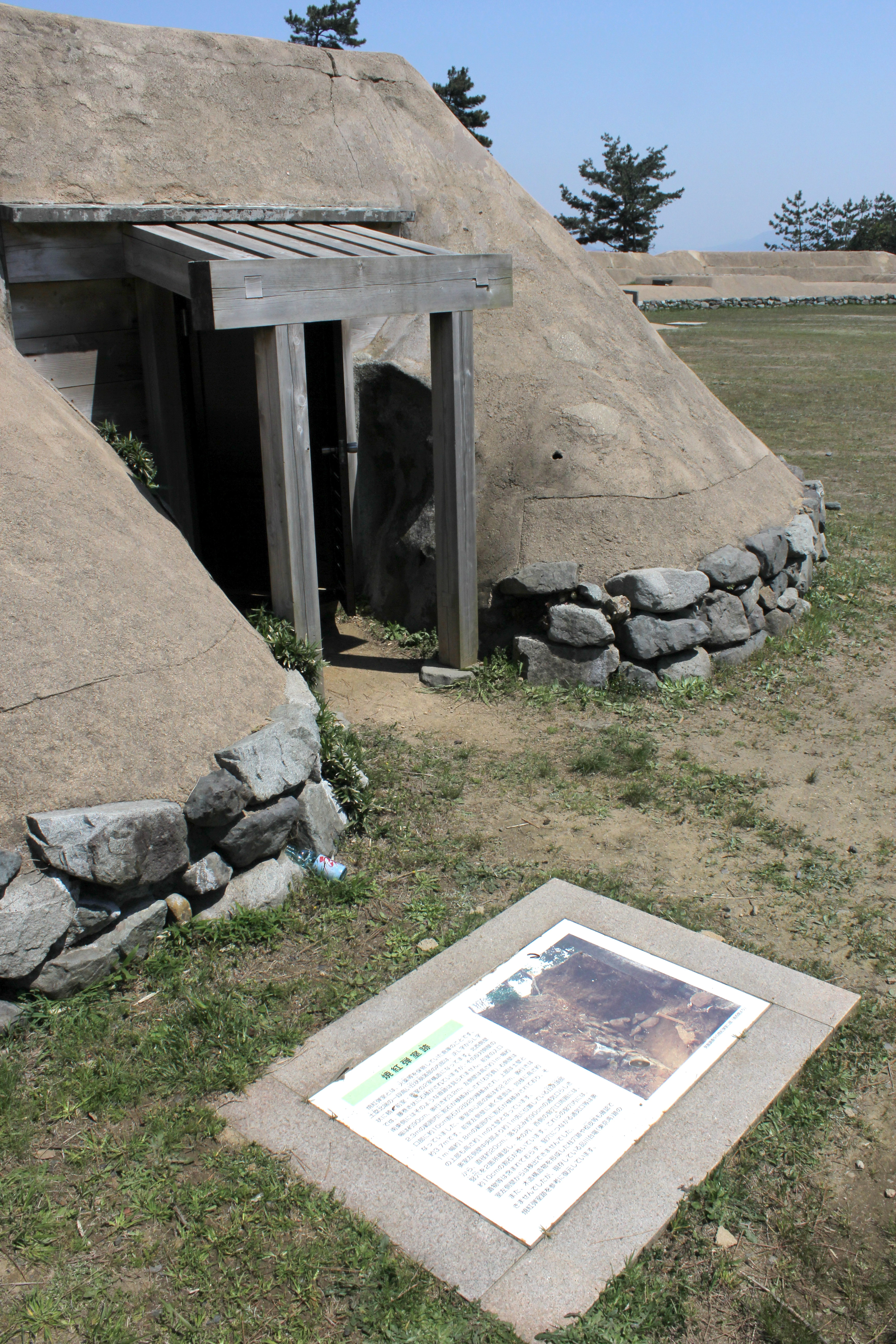
reconstructed ammunition depot for Matsugase No.2 Battery

== See also ==
- List of Historic Sites of Japan (Fukui)
