= 2010 Kyoto gubernatorial election =

Japanese gubernatorial election

- 11 April 2010
- Turnout: 41.09 ▲2.65
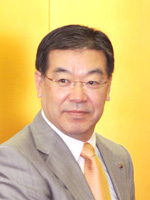
Candidate	Keiji Yamada	Mon Yusuke
Party	LDP	JCP
Popular vote	529,927	307,826
Percentage	63.26%	36.74%
Governor before election
Keiji Yamada
LDP
Elected Governor
Keiji Yamada
LDP

The 2010 Kyoto gubernatorial election was held on 11 April 2010 to elect the next governor of Kyoto (京都府, Kyoto-fu), a prefecture of Japan located in the Kansai region of Honshu island. Governor Keiji Yamada was re-elected for a third term, defeating Mon Yusuke with 63.26% of the vote.

== Candidates ==
- Keiji Yamada, 56, incumbent (since 2002), former Home Affairs Ministry bureaucrat, former vice governor of the prefecture. He was supported by the LDP, Komeito party, as well as the opposition DPJ and SDP.
- Mon Yusuke, of the Association for a Democratic Kyoto Government, endorsed by JCP.

== Results ==
Kyoto gubernatorial 2010
Party	Candidate	Votes	%	±%
LDP	Keiji Yamada	529,927	63.26	▼2,36
JCP	Mon Yusuke	307,826	36.74	▲2.36
Turnout		849.767	41,09	▲2.65
Registered electors		2,068.135		
LDP hold		Swing		
