= 2002 Kyoto gubernatorial election =

Japanese gubernatorial election

- 7 April 2002
- Turnout: 49.18 ▲5.07
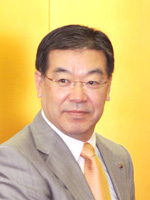
Candidate	Keiji Yamada	Akira Morikawa
Party	LDP	JCP
Popular vote	482,158	391,638
Percentage	48.69%	39.55%
Governor before election
Teiichi Aramaki
LDP
Elected Governor
Keiji Yamada
LDP

The 2002 Kyoto gubernatorial election was held on 13 March 2002 to elect the next governor of Kyoto (京都府, Kyoto-fu), a prefecture of Japan located in the Kansai region of Honshu island.

== Candidates ==
- Teiichi Aramaki, 71, incumbent since 1986, not seeking re-election. He supported Keiji Yamada.
- Keiji Yamada, 48, former Home Affairs Ministry bureaucrat, former vice governor of the prefecture. He was supported by the LDP, New Komeito party and the NCP, as well as the opposition DPJ, the LP and the SDP.
- Akira Morikawa, 53, lawyer, endorsed by JCP.
- Yasuhiro Nakagawa, 50, former mayor of the town of Yagi for the (LDP).
- Yutaka Imada, 36, former company employee.

== Results ==
Kyoto gubernatorial 2002
Party	Candidate	Votes	%	±%
LDP	Keiji Yamada	482,158	48.69	
JCP	Akira Morikawa	391,638	39.55	
LDP	Yasuhiro Nakagawa	99,144	10.01	
	Yutaka Imada	17,240	1.74	
Turnout		1.005.704	49,18	▲5.07
Registered electors		2,044.864		
LDP hold		Swing		
