= 2014 Kyoto gubernatorial election =

Japanese gubernatorial election

- 06 April 2014
- Turnout: 34.45 ▼7.45
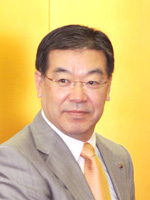
Candidate	Keiji Yamada	Nozomu Ozaki
Party	LDP	JCP
Popular vote	481,195	215,744
Percentage	69.04%	30.96%
Governor before election
Keiji Yamada
LDP
Elected Governor
Keiji Yamada
LDP

The 2014 Kyoto gubernatorial election was held on 6 April 2014 to elect the next governor of Kyoto (石川県, Kyoto-ken), a prefecture of Japan located in the Kansai region of Honshu island. Governor Keiji Yamada was re-elected for a fourth term, defeating Nozomu Ozaki with 69.04% of the vote.

== Candidates ==
- Keiji Yamada, 60, incumbent (since 2002), former Home Affairs Ministry bureaucrat, former vice governor of the prefecture. He was supported by the LDP, Komeito party, as well as the opposition DPJ and SDP.
- Nozomu Ozaki, of the Association for a Democratic Kyoto Government, endorsed by JCP.

== Results ==
Kyoto gubernatorial 2014
Party	Candidate	Votes	%	±%
LDP	Keiji Yamada	481,195	69.04	▲5,78
JCP	Nozomu Ozaki	215,744	30.96	▼5.78
Turnout		708.889	34,45	▼7.45
Registered electors		2,057.594		
LDP hold		Swing		
