= Takatoshi Nishiwaki =

Japanese politician

- 西脇 隆俊
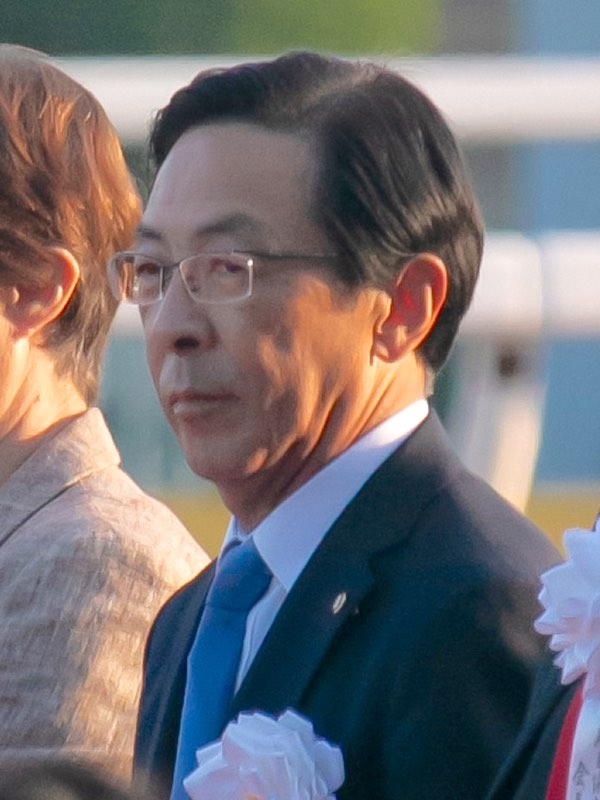

Governor of Kyoto Prefecture
- Incumbent
- Assumed office 16 April 2018
- Monarchs: Akihito; Naruhito
- Preceded by: Keiji Yamada

Personal details
- Born: 15 July 1955 (age 71) Shimogyō-ku, Kyoto, Japan
- Party: Independent
- Education: University of Tokyo

Takatoshi Nishiwaki (西脇 隆俊, Nishiwaki Takatoshi; born 15 July 1955) is a Japanese politician and the current Governor of Kyoto Prefecture.

== Governor of Kyoto ==
Nishiwaki won the 2018 gubernatorial election, defeating his sole opponent Kazuhito Fukuyama, with 55.90% of the vote. In the race, Nishiwaki was backed by the ruling LDP and Komeito, as well as major opposition parties including the Democratic Party, Constitutional Democratic Party, and Kibō no Tō. After his election victory, Nishiwaki vowed to continue the policies of his predecessor, Keiji Yamada, who had served as governor for 16 years. Nishiwaki is considered to have strong relations with the central government, and is expected to use his Tokyo connections to influence national decisions on major projects involving the prefecture. Nishiwaki is also a former Reconstruction Agency vice minister and transport ministry official. In the 2022 Kyoto gubernatorial election, Nishiwaki was re-elected to a second term, receiving 66.8% of the vote. Nishiwaki was re-elected once more in the 2026 election with 55.46% of the vote.
