= 2006 Kyoto gubernatorial election =

Japanese gubernatorial election

- 9 April 2006
- Turnout: 39.44 ▼10.74
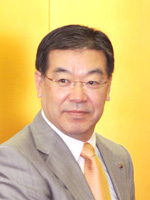
Candidate	Keiji Yamada	Kinugasa Yoko
Party	LDP	JCP
Popular vote	514,893	269,740
Percentage	65.62%	34.38%
Governor before election
Keiji Yamada
LDP
Elected Governor
Keiji Yamada
LDP

The 2006 Kyoto gubernatorial election was held on 9 April 2006 to elect the next governor of Kyoto (京都府, Kyoto-fu), a prefecture of Japan located in the Kansai region of Honshu island. Governor Keiji Yamada was re-elected for a second term, defeating Kinugasa Yoko with 65.62% of the vote.

== Candidates ==
- Keiji Yamada, 52, incumbent (since 2002), former Home Affairs Ministry bureaucrat, former vice governor of the prefecture. He was supported by the LDP, Komeito party, as well as the opposition DPJ and SDP.
- Kinugasa Yoko, endorsed by JCP.

== Results ==
Kyoto gubernatorial 2006
Party	Candidate	Votes	%	±%
LDP	Keiji Yamada	514,893	65.62	▲16,93
JCP	Kinugasa Yoko	269,740	34.38	▼5.17
Turnout		795.207	38,44	▼10.74
Registered electors		2,068.690		
LDP hold		Swing		
