= Hiragana and katakana place names =

Japanese municipalities whose names are not written in kanji

There are a small number of municipalities in Japan whose names are written in hiragana or katakana, together known as kana, rather than kanji as is traditional for Japanese place names. Many city names written in kana have kanji equivalents that are either phonetic manyōgana, or whose kanji are outside of the jōyō kanji. Others, such as Tsukuba in Ibaraki Prefecture, are taken from localities or landmarks whose names continue to be written in kanji. Another cause is the merger of multiple cities, one of which had the original kanji — in such cases, the hiragana place name is used to create a new identity for the merged city, distinct from the constituent city with the same kanji name.

== List of fully hiragana cities and towns ==
Romaji	Hiragana	Kanji	Prefecture
Ama	あま市	海部	Aichi
Awara	あわら市	芦原	Fukui
Ebino	えびの市	蝦野	Miyazaki
Erimo	えりも町	襟裳	Hokkaidō
Hitachinaka	ひたちなか市	常陸那珂	Ibaraki
Inabe	いなべ市	員弁	Mie
Ino	いの町	伊野	Kōchi
Isumi	いすみ市	夷隅	Chiba
Iwaki	いわき市	磐城	Fukushima
Kahoku	かほく市	河北	Ishikawa
Kasumigaura	かすみがうら市	霞ヶ浦	Ibaraki
Katsuragi	かつらぎ町	葛城	Wakayama
Mannō	まんのう町	満濃	Kagawa
Midori	みどり市	緑	Gunma
Minabe	みなべ町	南部	Wakayama
Minakami	みなかみ町	水上	Gunma
Miyama	みやま市	三山	Fukuoka
Miyoshi	みよし市	三好	Aichi
Mukawa	むかわ町	鵡川	Hokkaidō
Mutsu	むつ市	陸奥	Aomori
Nikaho	にかほ市	仁賀保	Akita
Oirase	おいらせ町	奥入瀬	Aomori
Ōi	おおい町	大飯	Fukui
Saitama	さいたま市	埼玉	Saitama
Sakura	さくら市	桜	Tochigi
Sanuki	さぬき市	讃岐	Kagawa
Setana	せたな町	瀬棚	Hokkaidō
Susami	すさみ町	周参見	Wakayama
Tatsuno	たつの市	龍野	Hyōgo
Tokigawa	ときがわ町	都幾川	Saitama
Tsugaru	つがる市	津軽	Aomori
Tsukuba	つくば市	筑波	Ibaraki
Tsukubamirai	つくばみらい市	筑波未来	Ibaraki
Tsurugi	つるぎ町	剣	Tokushima
Ukiha	うきは市	浮羽	Fukuoka
Uruma	うるま市	宇流麻	Okinawa

== List of partially Hiragana cities ==
City / Town	Hiragana + Kanji	Full kanji	Prefecture
Akiruno	あきる野市	秋留野、阿伎留野	Tokyo
Ichikikushikino	いちき串木野市	市来串木野	Kagoshima
Higashikagawa	東かがわ市	東香川	Kagawa
Higashimiyoshi	東みよし町	東三好	Tokushima
Kinokawa	紀の川市	紀之川	Wakayama
Minamiawaji	南あわじ市	南淡路	Hyōgo
Izunokuni	伊豆の国市	伊豆之国	Shizuoka
Fujimino	ふじみ野市	富士見野	Saitama

== List of Katakana cities ==
Romanized /in English	Katakana + Kanji	Prefecture	Remarks
Niseko	ニセコ町	Hokkaidō	from Ainu
Minami-Alps	南アルプス市	Yamanashi	from the eponymous Akaishi Mountains (赤石山脈), also known as 南アルプス (Southern Alps) in Japanese
Yūkarigaoka	ユーカリが丘	Chiba	from "eucalyptus hill", even though Australian eucalyptus trees do not occur in the area naturally.
