= 2022 Kyoto gubernatorial election =

Japanese gubernatorial election

- 10 April 2022
- Turnout: 37.58% ▲2.41%
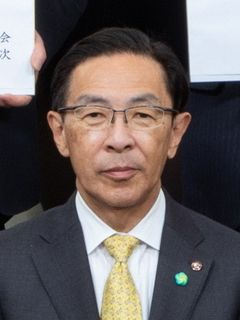

Candidate	Takatoshi Nishiwaki	Ken Kajikawa
Party	Independent	Independent
Popular vote	505,651	251,261
Percentage	66.81%	33.19%
Supported by	LDP, Komeito, CDP, DPFP	JCP
Governor before election
Takatoshi Nishiwaki
Independent
Elected Governor
Takatoshi Nishiwaki
Independent

The 2022 Kyoto gubernatorial election was held on 10 April 2022 to elect the next governor of Kyoto (京都府, Kyoto-fu), a prefecture of Japan located in the Kansai region of Honshu island. Incumbent Governor Takatoshi Nishiwaki was re-elected for a second term, defeating Ken Kajikawa with 66.81% of the vote.

== Candidates ==
- Takatoshi Nishiwaki, 66, incumbent (since 2018), was supported by the ruling coalition of the LDP and Komeito, as well as the opposition party CDP and DPFP.
- Ken Kajikawa, 62, head of a labor organization, endorsed by JCP.

== Results ==
Kyoto gubernatorial 2022
Party	Candidate	Votes	%	±%
Independent	Takatoshi Nishiwaki *	505,651	66.81	▲10.91
Independent	Ken Kajikawa	251,261	33.19	▼10.91
Turnout		775.461	37.58	▲2.41
Registered electors		2,063.401		
Independent hold		Swing		
