= Ōi, Fukui =

Ōi おおい町
- Town
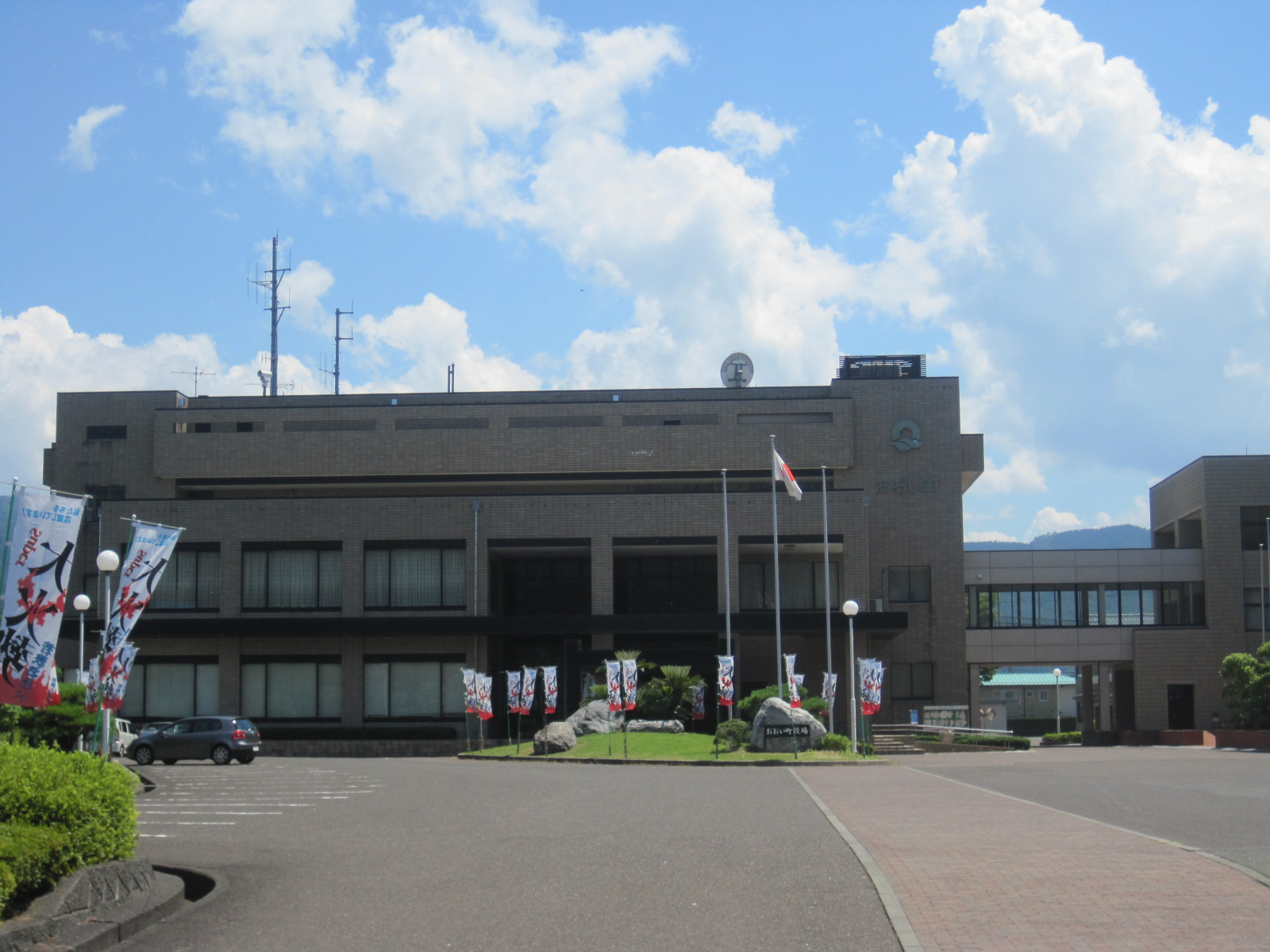
- Ōi Town Hall

- Flag Seal

- Location of Ōi in Fukui Prefecture

- Coordinates: 35°28′52.2″N 135°37′1,8″E
- Country: Japan
- Region: Chūbu (Hokuriku)
- Prefecture: Fukui
- District: Ōi

Area
  - Total: 212.19 km^{2} (81.93 sq mi)

Population (April 2018)
  - Total: 8,102
  - Density: 38.18/km^{2} (98.89/sq mi)
- Time zone: UTC+9 (Japan Standard Time)
- City symbols
- -Tree: Myrica rubra
- -Flower: Sakura
- Phone number: 0770-77-1111
- Address: 71-7-1 Miyazaki, Takahama-cho, Ōi-gun, Fukui-ken 919-2292
- Website: www.town.ohi.fukui.jp

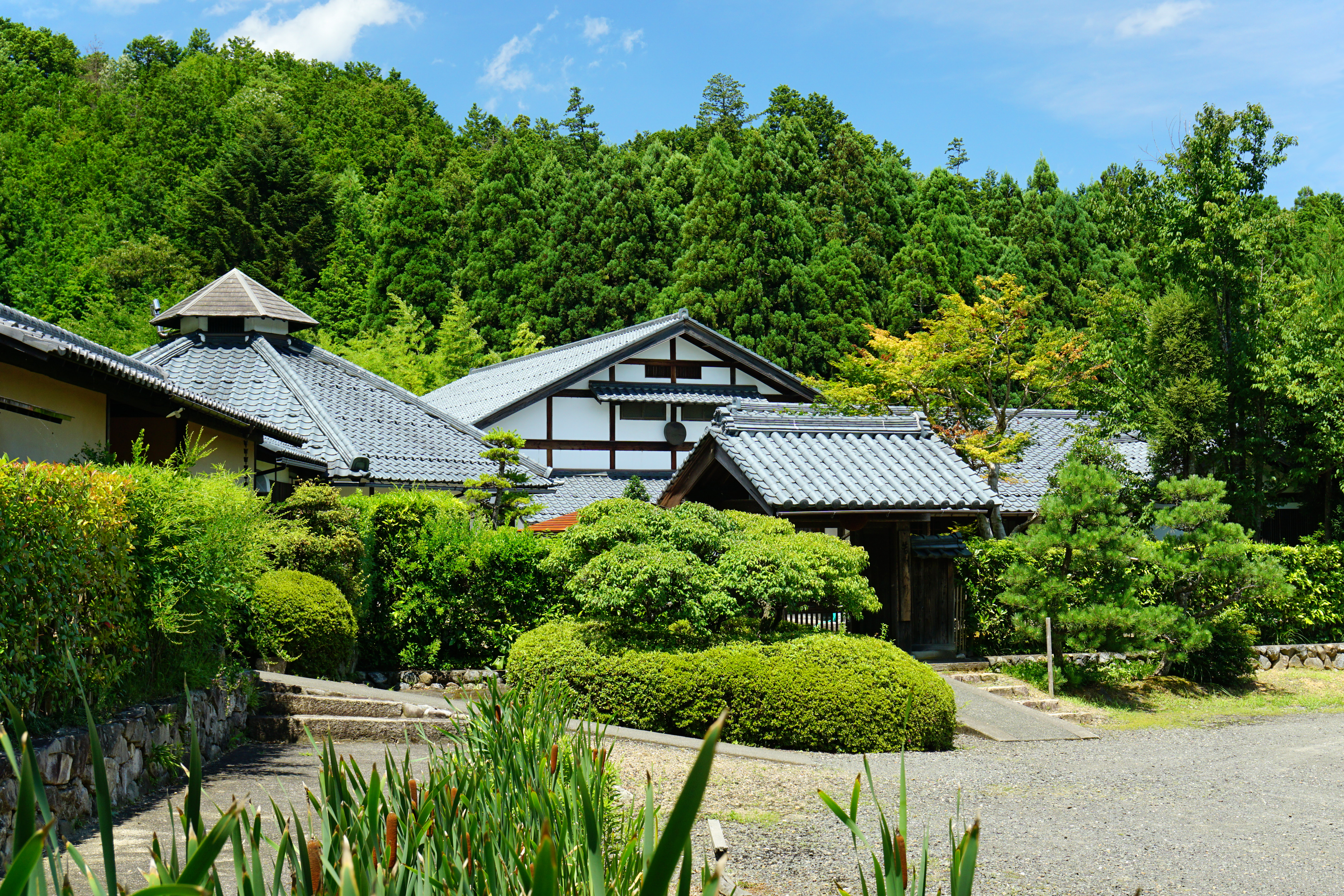
Jakushu Itteki-bunko

Ōi (おおい町, Ōi-chō) is a town located in Fukui Prefecture, Japan. As of 1 June 2018, the town had an estimated population of 8,102 and a population density of 63 persons per km^{2}. The total area of the town was 212.19 square kilometres (81.93 sq mi). It is one of the few Hiragana towns in Japan.

== Geography ==
Ōi is located in the far southwestern corner of Fukui Prefecture, bordered by Kyoto Prefecture to the south, Shiga Prefecture to the southeast and the heavily indented ria coast of Obama Bay (within Wakasa Bay) of Sea of Japan to the north. Parts of the town are within the borders of the Wakasa Wan Quasi-National Park.

=== Neighbouring municipalities ===
- Fukui Prefecture
  - Obama
  - Takahama
- Shiga Prefecture
  - Takashima
- Kyoto Prefecture
  - Ayabe
  - Nantan

=== Climate ===
Ōi has a humid subtropical climate (Köppen Cfa) characterized by warm, wet summers and cold winters with heavy snowfall. The average annual temperature in Ōi is 14.9 °C. The average annual rainfall is 1949 mm with September as the wettest month. The temperatures are highest on average in August, at around 27.34 °C, and lowest in January, at around 3.9 °C.

== Demographics ==
Per Japanese census data, the population of Ōi has declined over the past 30 years.

Historical population
Year	Pop.	±%
1970	9,291	—
1980	9,156	−1.5%
1990	10,598	+15.7%
2000	9,983	−5.8%
2010	8,580	−14.1%
2020	7,910	−7.8%

== History ==
Ōi is part of ancient Wakasa Province. During the Edo period, the area was part of the holdings of Obama Domain. Following the Meiji restoration, it was organised into part of Ōi District in Fukui Prefecture. With the establishment of the modern municipalities system on April 1, 1889, the villages of Saburi, Ōshima, and Hongō were established. These villages merged to form the town of Ōi on January 15, 1955. On March 3, 2006, the village of Natashō, from Onyū District, was merged into Ōi, which is since written with hiragana instead of kanji. Before the merger the town was written 大飯町.

== Economy ==
The economy of Ōi, previously dependent on commercial fishing, forestry and agriculture is now very heavily dependent on the nuclear power industry. The partial closure of the Ōi Nuclear Power Plant has since the 2011 Fukushima Nuclear Disaster has adversely affected the local economy.

== Education ==
Ōi has four public elementary schools and two public middle schools operated by the town government. The town does not have a high school.

== Transportation ==
=== Railway ===
- JR West - Obama Line
  - Wakasa-Hongō

=== Highway ===
- Maizuru-Wakasa Expressway
- National Route 27
- National Route 162

== Sister cities ==
- Tamsui District, Taiwan

== Local attractions ==
- Obama Domain Battery Sites, a National Historic Site
