= 2026 Kyoto gubernatorial election =

- 5 April 2026
- Turnout: 37.58% （▼0.15）
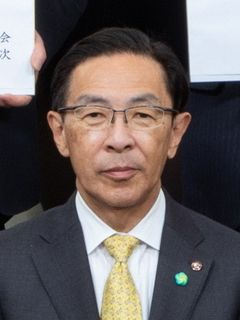

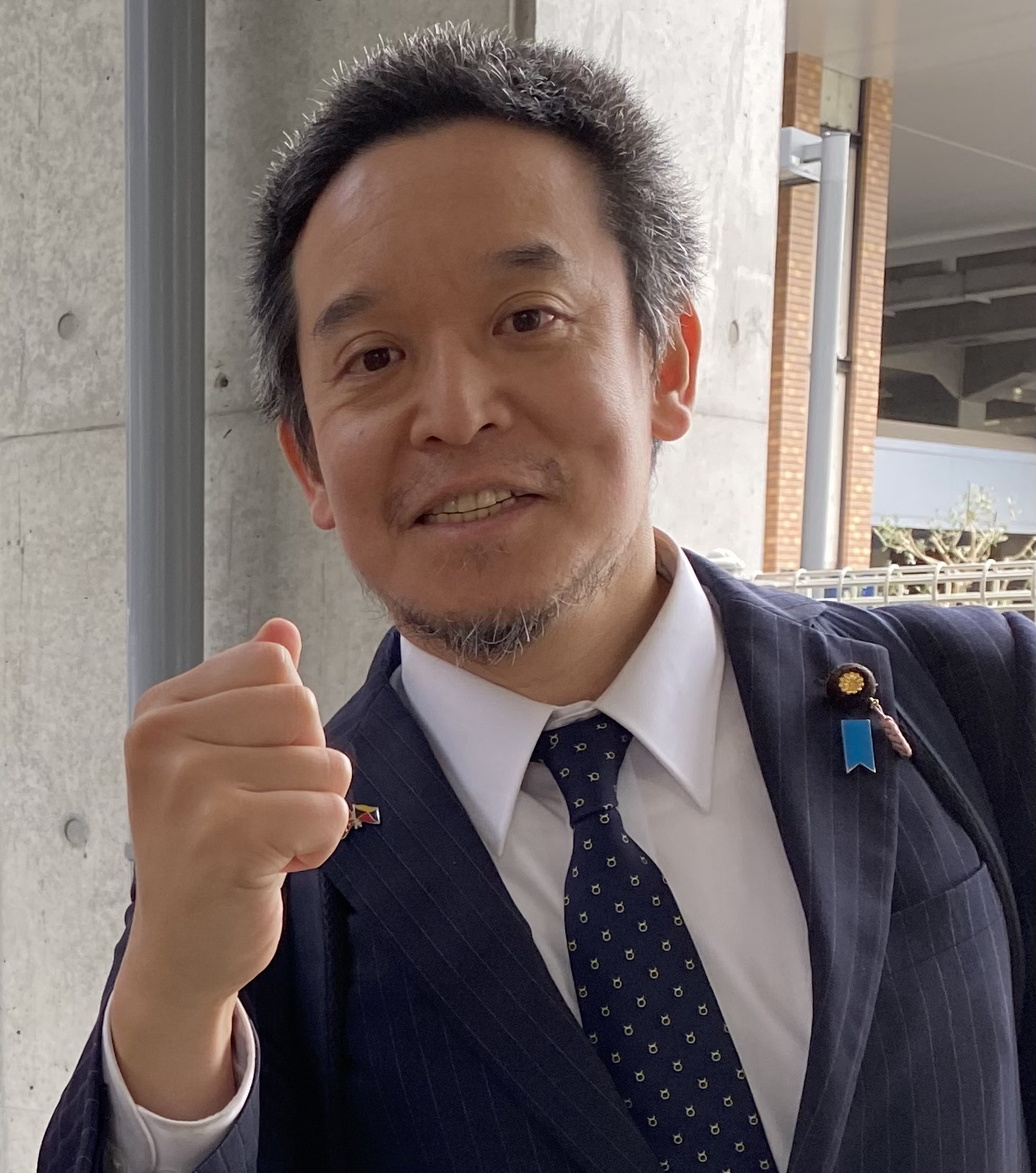

| Candidate | Takatoshi Nishiwaki | Satoshi Hamada | Nobuo Fujii |
| Party | Independent | Japan Liberal Party (2025) | Independent |
| Popular vote | 412,583 | 181,998 | 149,330 |
| Percentage | 55.46% | 24.47% | 20.07% |
| Supported by | LDP, DPP, CRA, CDP, Komeito | — | JCP |
Governor before election
Takatoshi Nishiwaki
Independent
Elected Governor
Takatoshi Nishiwaki
Independent

The 2026 Kyoto gubernatorial election was held on 5 April 2026 to elect the next governor of Kyoto (京都府, Kyoto-fu), a prefecture of Japan located in the Kansai region of Honshu island.

== Timeline ==
=== 2026 ===
- On 10 January 2026, Incumbent governor Takatoshi Nishiwaki announced his candidacy for the governor.
- On 16 January 2026, Nobuo Fujii, a professor of Kyoto Kacho University, announced his candidacy for the governor.
- On 9 March 2026, Satoshi Hamada announced his candidacy for the governor.

=== Grok hoax ===
On April 3, 2026, Kyoto-based The Kyoto Shimbun requested that the AI summary tweet of the publication's polling article about the gubernatorial election become viral on X. Grok erroneously tweeted that the Satoshi Hamada and incumbent governor Takatoshi Nishiwaki were tied in a poll conducted by the publication, despite the article stating that Nishiwaki was in the lead. According to an election watcher, the information that the chatbot gather the information was from a right-wing X account supporting Hamada.

== Candidates ==
A total of 3 candidates registered candidacies for the election.

| Name | Age | Party | Title |
|---|---|---|---|
| Nobuo Fujii （藤井 伸生） | 69 | Independent (Note: endorsed by JCP.) | Professor of Kyoto Kacho University |
| Takatoshi Nishiwaki （西脇 隆俊） | 70 | Independent (Note: endorsed by LDP, DPP, CRA, CDP, Komeito.) | Incumbent Governor of Kyoto Prefecture |
| Satoshi Hamada （浜田 聡） | 48 | Liberal | Former member of the House of Councillors |

== Results ==
Percentage of each candidate votes
1. Takatoshi Nishiwaki (55.5%)
2. Satoshi Hamada (24.5%)
3. Nobuo Fujii (20.1%)

Incumbent Nishiwaki defeated Hamada and Fujii.

Kyoto gubernatorial 2026
| Party | Candidate | Votes | % | ±% |
|---|---|---|---|---|
| Independent | Takatoshi Nishiwaki | 412,583 | 55.46 | -11.35 |
| Liberal | Satoshi Hamada | 181,998 | 24.47 | n/a |
| Independent | Nobuo Fujii | 149,330 | 20.07 | n/a |
| Turnout | | 743,911 | 37.58 | ▼0.15 |
| Registered electors | | 2,012,100 | | |
| Independent hold | | | | |

Results by municipality
| Municipalities | | Takatoshi Nishiwaki | | Satoshi Hamada | | Nobuo Fujii | |
| Municipalities | | Votes | % | Votes | % | Votes | % |
|---|---|---|---|---|---|---|---|
| Total | | 412,583 | 55.46% | 181,998 | 24.47% | 149,330 | 20.07% |
| Kyoto | Kita-ku | 16,258 | 49.06% | 8,730 | 26.34% | 8,153 | 24.60% |
| Kyoto | Kamigyō-ku | 11,882 | 49.90% | 6,266 | 26.31% | 5,666 | 23.79% |
| Kyoto | Sakyō-ku | 21,744 | 45.87% | 11,193 | 23.61% | 14,464 | 30.51% |
| Kyoto | Nakagyō-ku | 16,515 | 49.58% | 9,618 | 28.88% | 7,174 | 21.54% |
| Kyoto | Higashiyama-ku | 4,551 | 49.12% | 2,598 | 28.04% | 2,117 | 22.85% |
| Kyoto | Shimogyō-ku | 11,344 | 49.89% | 7,078 | 31.13% | 4,317 | 18.99% |
| Kyoto | Minami-ku | 12,190 | 49.39% | 7,476 | 30.29% | 5,017 | 20.33% |
| Kyoto | Ukyō-ku | 28,997 | 50.44% | 14,931 | 25.97% | 13,565 | 23.59% |
| Kyoto | Fushimi-ku | 35,305 | 52.46% | 17,736 | 26.36% | 14,254 | 21.18% |
| Kyoto | Yamashina-ku | 17,283 | 52.24% | 9,250 | 27.96% | 6,549 | 19.80% |
| Kyoto | Nishikyō-ku | 21,628 | 52.63% | 10,647 | 25.91% | 8,823 | 21.47% |
| Fukuchiyama | | 14,858 | 64.52% | 4,761 | 20.67% | 3,410 | 14.81% |
| Maizuru | | 15,065 | 61.94% | 6,171 | 25.37% | 3,086 | 12.69% |
| Ayabe | | 7,033 | 65.87% | 1,843 | 17.26% | 1,801 | 16.87% |
| Uji | | 28,925 | 56.37% | 12,094 | 23.57% | 10,298 | 20.07% |
| Miyazu | | 4,559 | 70.01% | 1,015 | 15.59% | 938 | 14.40% |
| Kameoka | | 16,575 | 63.26% | 5,453 | 20.81% | 4,175 | 15.93% |
| Jōyō | | 12,730 | 59.92% | 4,564 | 21.48% | 3,950 | 18.59% |
| Mukō | | 9,278 | 55.05% | 4,120 | 24.44% | 3,457 | 20.51% |
| Nagaokakyō | | 14,548 | 55.99% | 6,404 | 24.65% | 5,032 | 19.37% |
| Yawata | | 11,434 | 58.44% | 4,562 | 23.32% | 3,569 | 18.24% |
| Kyōtanabe | | 12,063 | 58.04% | 5,388 | 25.92% | 3,334 | 16.04% |
| Kyōtango | | 13,035 | 66.88% | 3,448 | 17.69% | 3,006 | 15.42% |
| Nantan | | 7,311 | 63.34% | 2,058 | 17.83% | 2,173 | 18.83% |
| Kizugawa | | 14,512 | 60.84% | 5,505 | 23.08% | 3,836 | 16.08% |
| Otokuni District | Ōyamazaki | 2,931 | 53.22% | 1,321 | 23.99% | 1,255 | 22.79% |
| Kuse District | Kumiyama | 2,703 | 63.66% | 935 | 22.02% | 608 | 14.32% |
| Tsuzuki District | Ide | 2,562 | 72.64% | 598 | 16.95% | 367 | 10.41% |
| Tsuzuki District | Ujitawara | 2,233 | 70.69% | 576 | 18.23% | 350 | 11.08% |
| Sōraku District | Kasagi | 402 | 74.58% | 69 | 12.80% | 68 | 12.62% |
| Sōraku District | Wazuka | 1,389 | 79.69% | 192 | 11.02% | 162 | 9.29% |
| Sōraku District | Seika | 7,523 | 62.28% | 2,686 | 22.24% | 1,870 | 15.48% |
| Sōraku District | Minamiyamashiro | 838 | 72.24% | 141 | 12.16% | 181 | 15.60% |
| Funai District | Kyōtamba | 3,980 | 70.84% | 838 | 14.92% | 800 | 14.24% |
| Yosa District | Ine | 777 | 75.80% | 109 | 10.63% | 139 | 13.56% |
| Yosa District | Yosano | 7,622 | 71.82% | 1,624 | 15.30% | 1,366 | 12.87% |
