= Keiji Yamada =

Japanese politician (born 1954)

- 山田 啓二
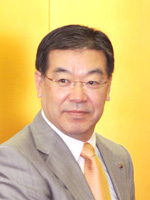

Governor of Kyoto Prefecture
- In office 16 April 2002 – 16 April 2018
- Monarch: Akihito
- Preceded by: Teiichi Aramaki
- Succeeded by: Takatoshi Nishiwaki

Personal details
- Born: 5 April 1954 (age 72) Sumoto, Hyōgo, Japan
- Party: Independent
- Education: University of Tokyo

Keiji Yamada (山田 啓二, Yamada Keiji; born 5 April 1954) is a Japanese politician and former Governor of Kyoto Prefecture. A native of Hyōgo Prefecture and 1977 graduate of the University of Tokyo, he had worked at the Ministry of Home Affairs since 1977 and served as the vice governor of Kyoto Prefecture before elected governor for the first time in 2002. In 2011 he also took over from Wataru Asō as President of the National Governors Association.

Yamada ended his 16-year tenure as governor in April 2018. While stating that he had accomplished his goals in office, Yamada was believed to be preparing for a run in the 2019 House of Councillors election.
