= Fukui (city) =

Fukui 福井市
- Prefecture capital and Core city
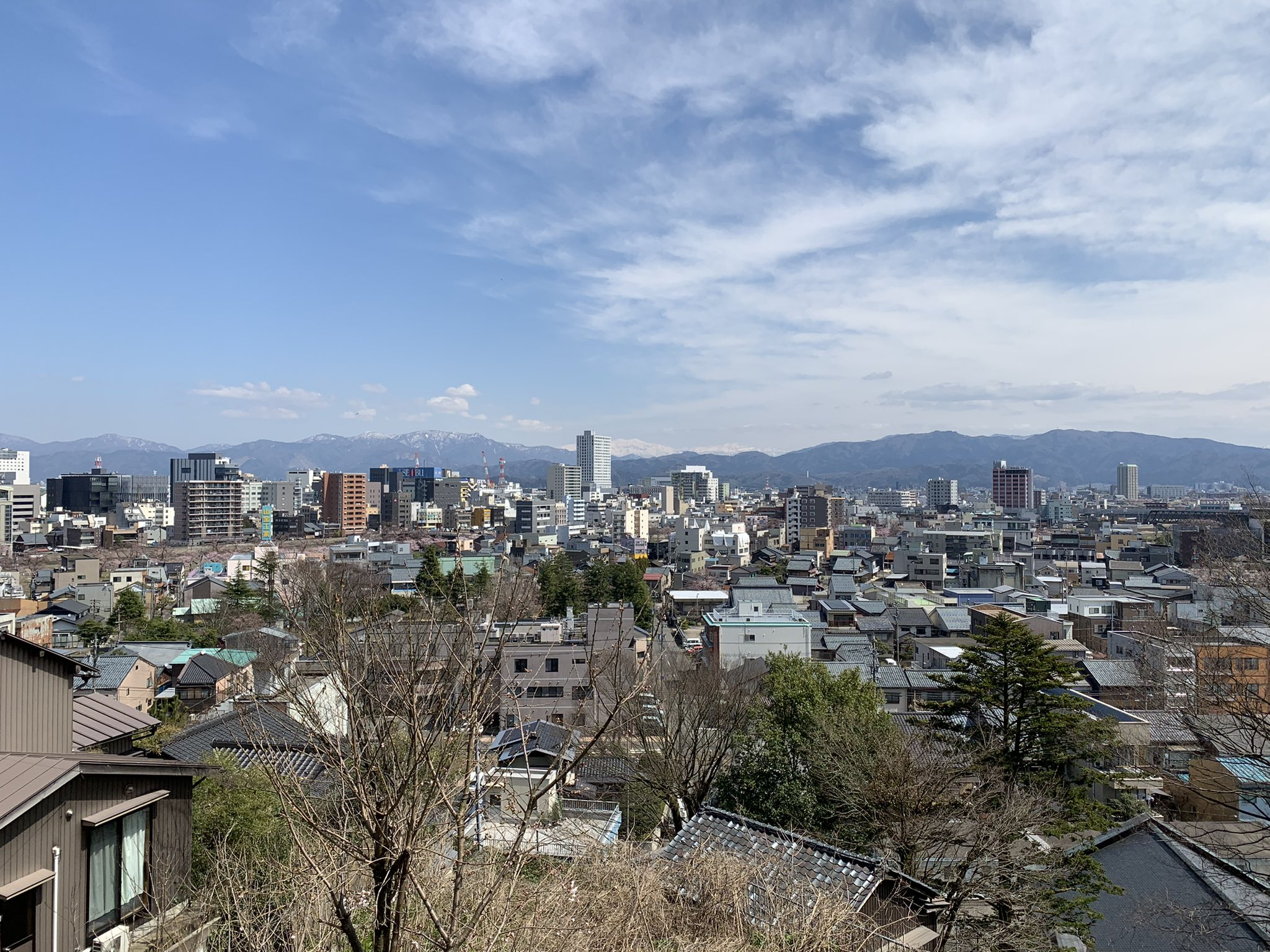

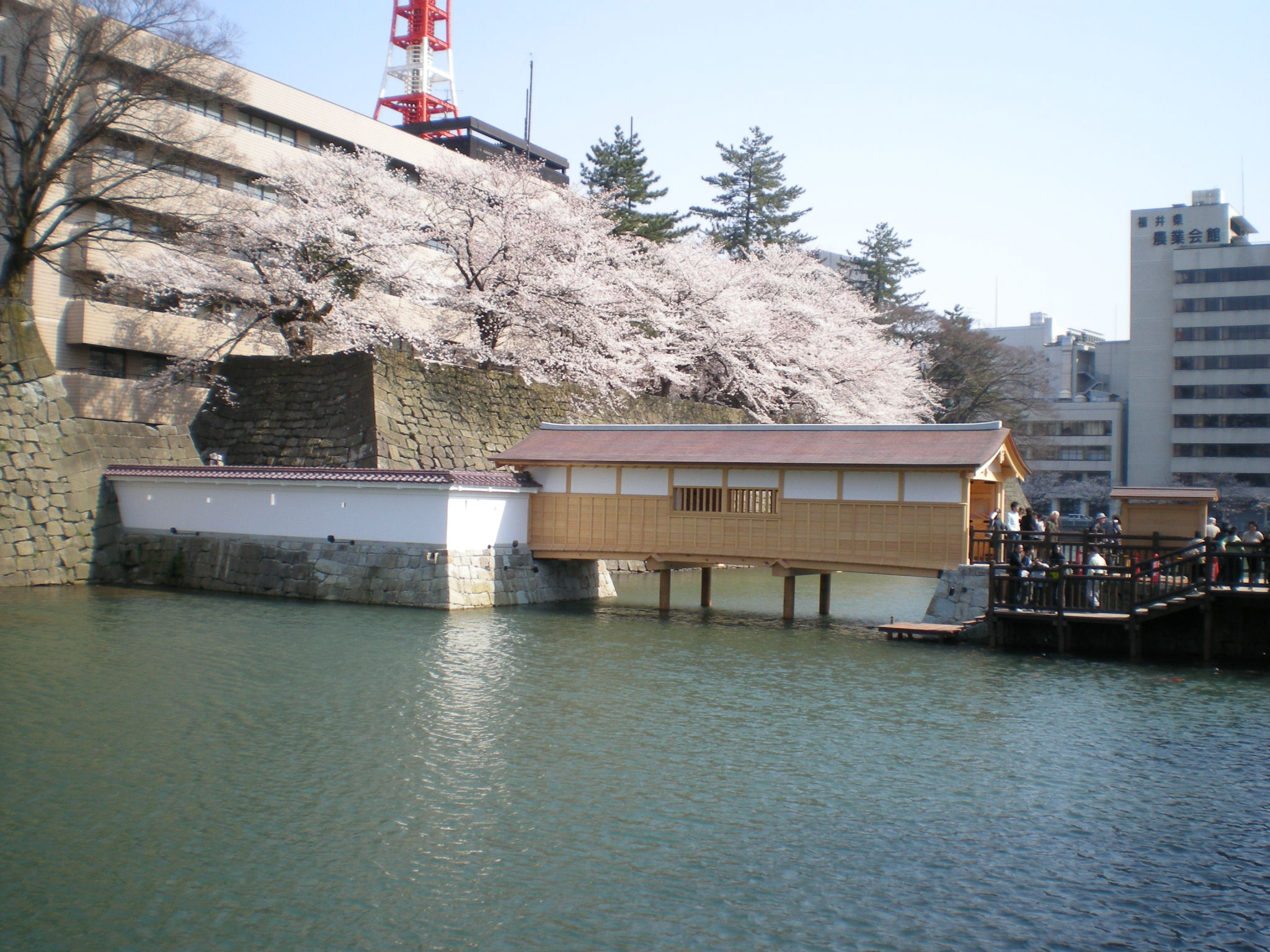

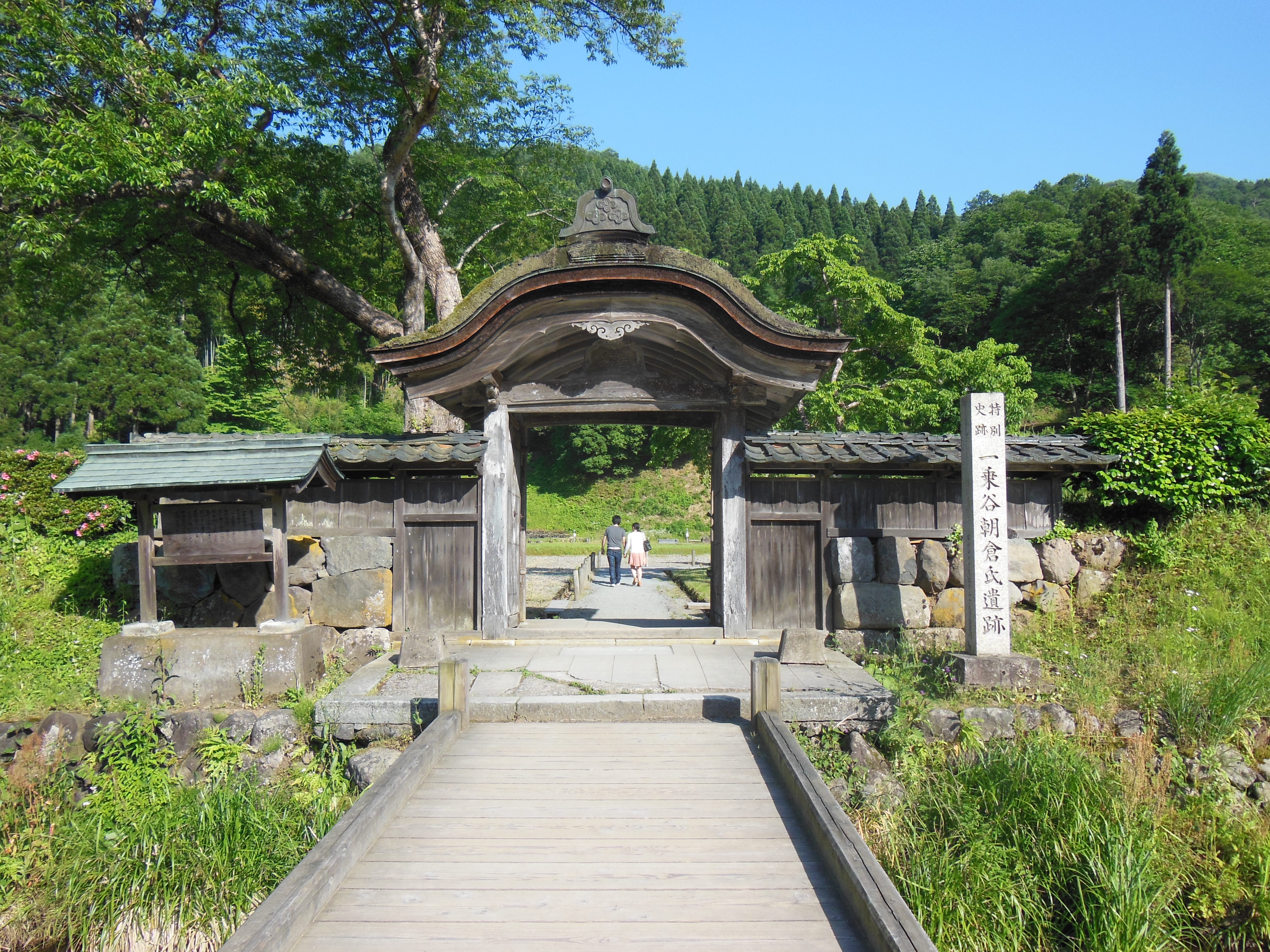

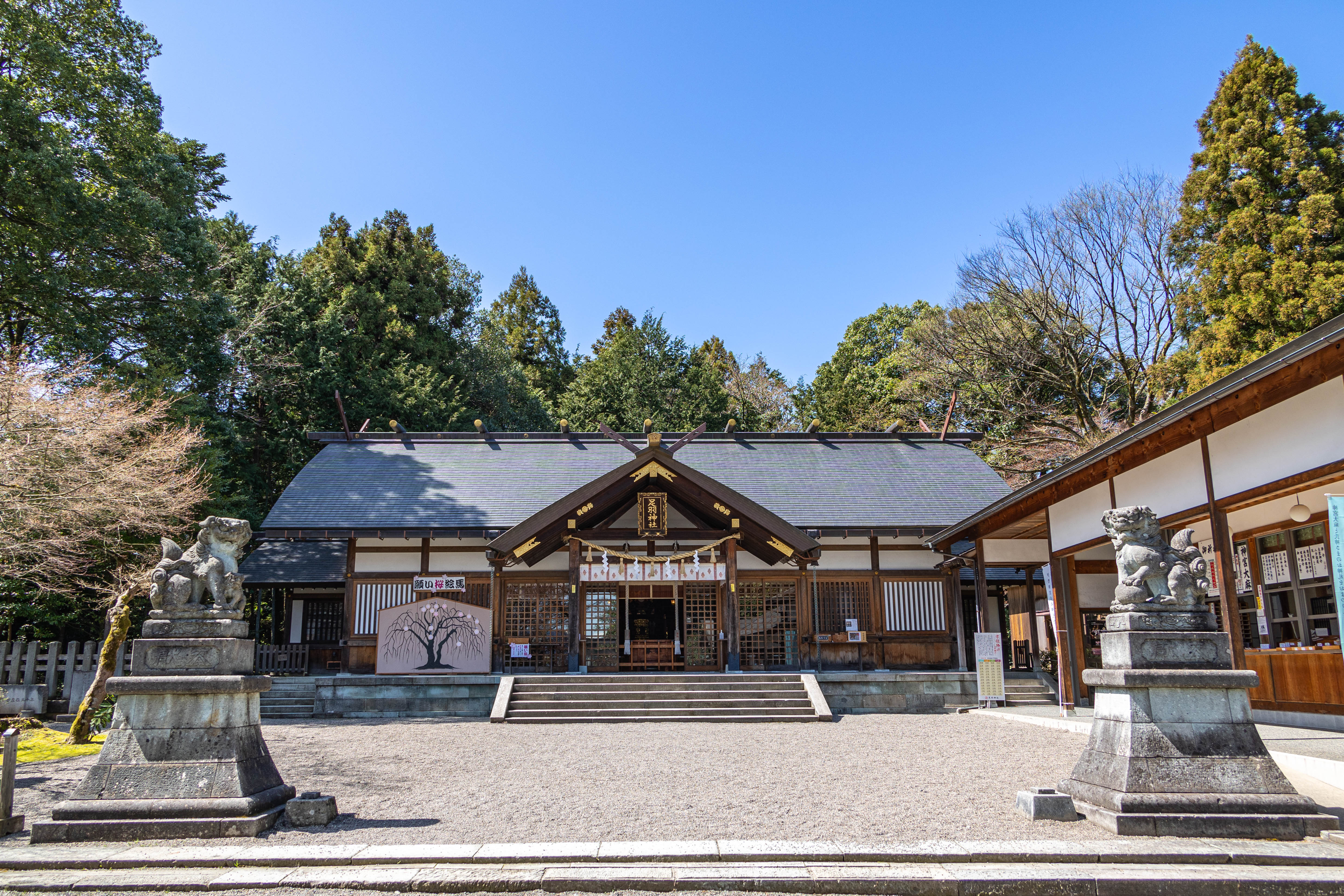

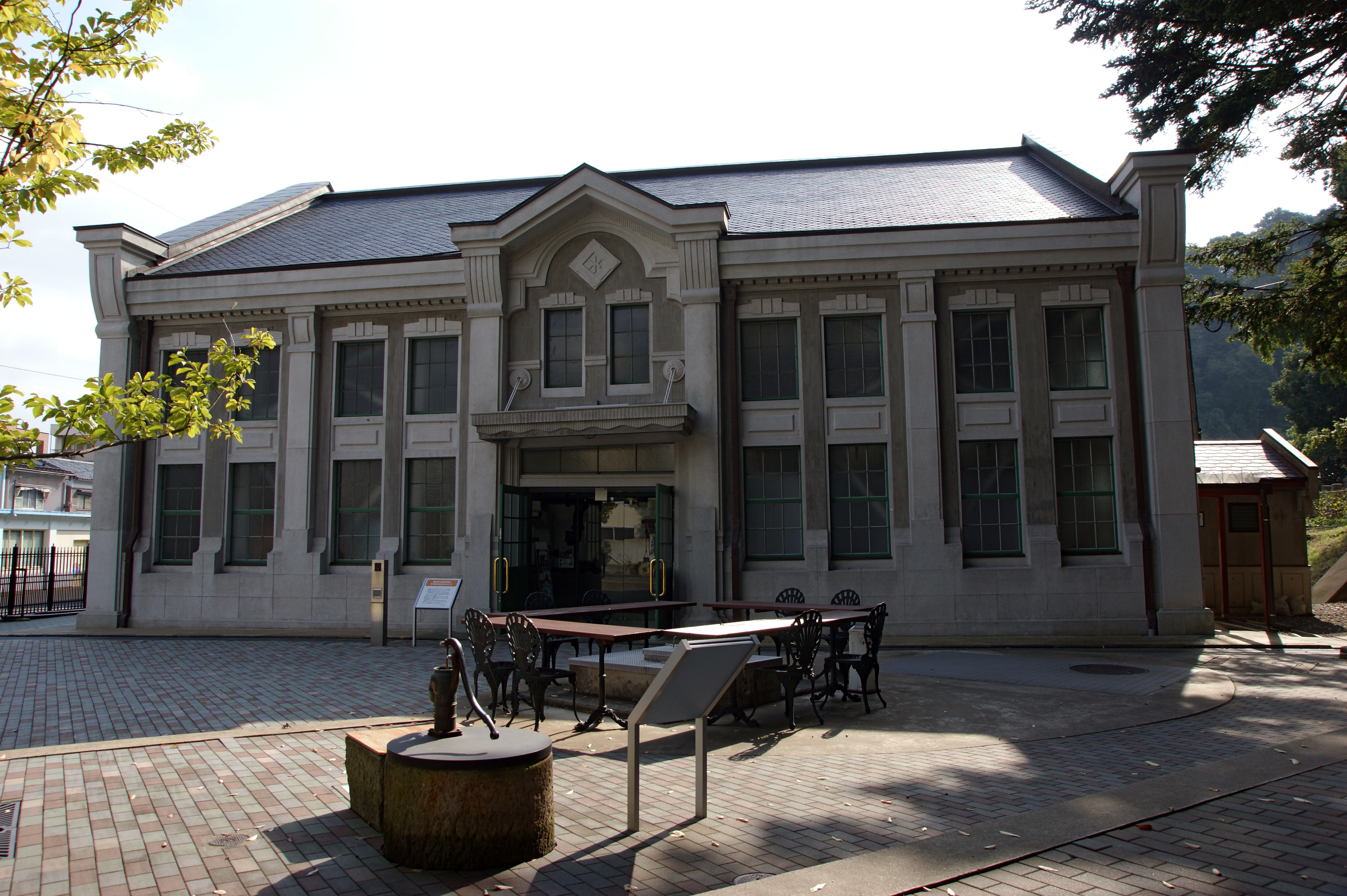

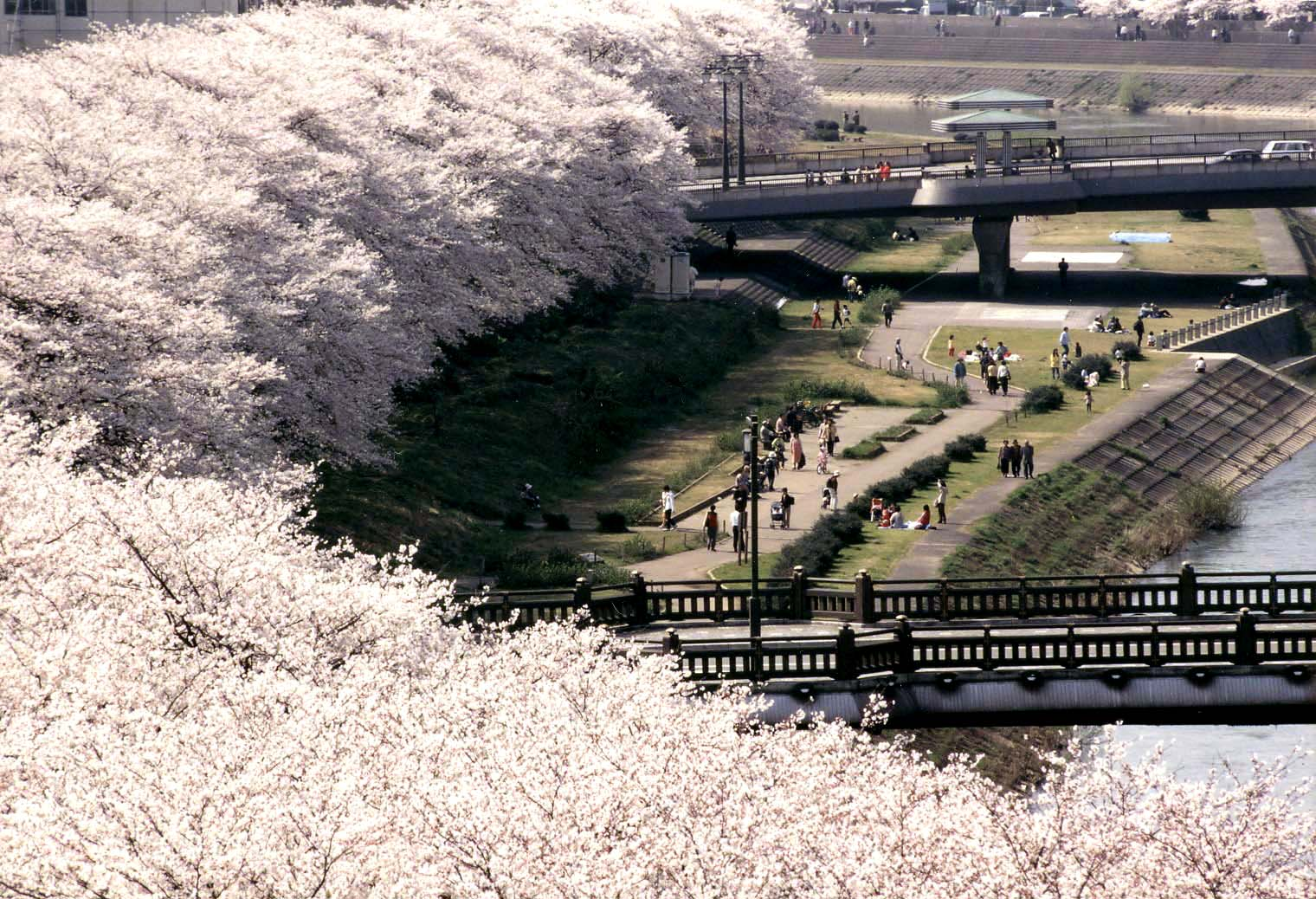

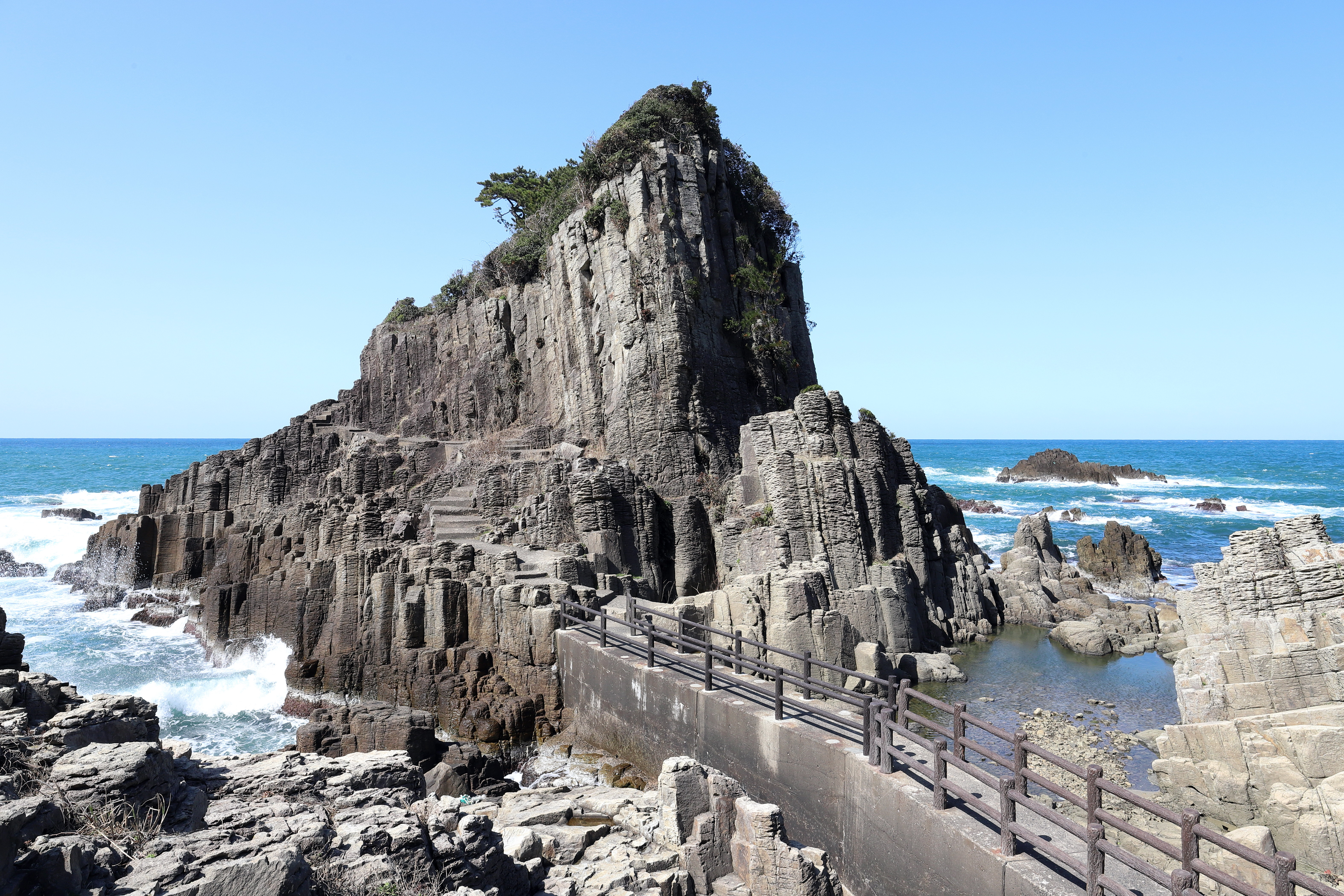
Fukui city skyline as seen from Mt. Asuwa
Fukui Castle	Ichijōdani Asakura Family Historic Ruins
Asuwa Jinjya	Fukui City Water Service Memorial
Cherry trees along the Asuwa River	Echizen-Kaga Kaigan Quasi-National Park
- Flag Seal
- Interactive map of Fukui
- Coordinates: 36°3′50.6″N 136°13′10.5″E
- Country: Japan
- Region: Chūbu (Hokuriku)
- Prefecture: Fukui

Government
  - - Mayor: Shigeru Saigyō (since December 2023)

Area
  - Total: 536.41 km^{2} (207.11 sq mi)

Population (July 1, 2017)
  - Total: 264,217
  - Density: 492.57/km^{2} (1,275.7/sq mi)
- Time zone: UTC+9 (Japan Standard Time)
- Phone number: 0776-20-5111
- Address: 3-10-1 Ōte, Fukui-shi, Fukui-ken 910-8511
- Climate: Cfa
- Website: www.city.fukui.lg.jp
- Symbols
- Flower: Hydrangea
- Tree: Pine

Fukui (福井市, Fukui-shi; Japanese pronunciation: [ɸɯ̥̈.kɯ̈́ì, -kɯ̈́í, -kɯ̈̀ì, -kɯ̈́.í.ɕì, -kɯ̈́ì-]) is the capital city of Fukui Prefecture, Japan. As of 1 March 2024, the city had an estimated population of 255,332 in 107,553 households. Its total area is 536.41 square kilometres (207.11 sq mi) and its population density is about 476 persons per km^{2}. Most of the population lives in a small central area; the city limits include rural plains, mountainous areas, and suburban sprawl along the Route 8 bypass. Having suffered devastation during World War II and an earthquake in 1948, Fukui was nicknamed 'Phoenix City', symbolising its rebirth from ashes and destruction.

== Overview ==
=== Cityscape ===
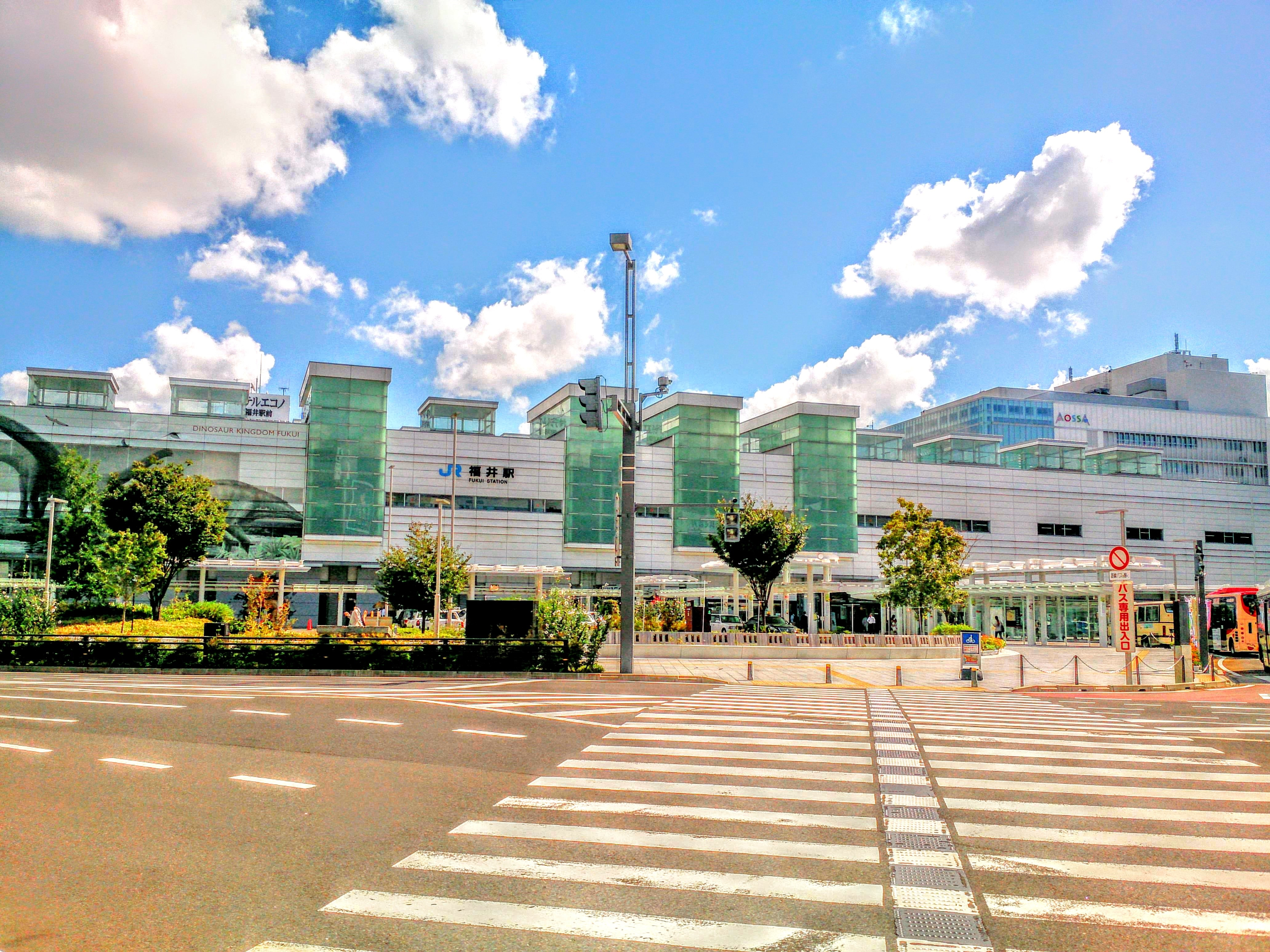
Fukui Station (2018)

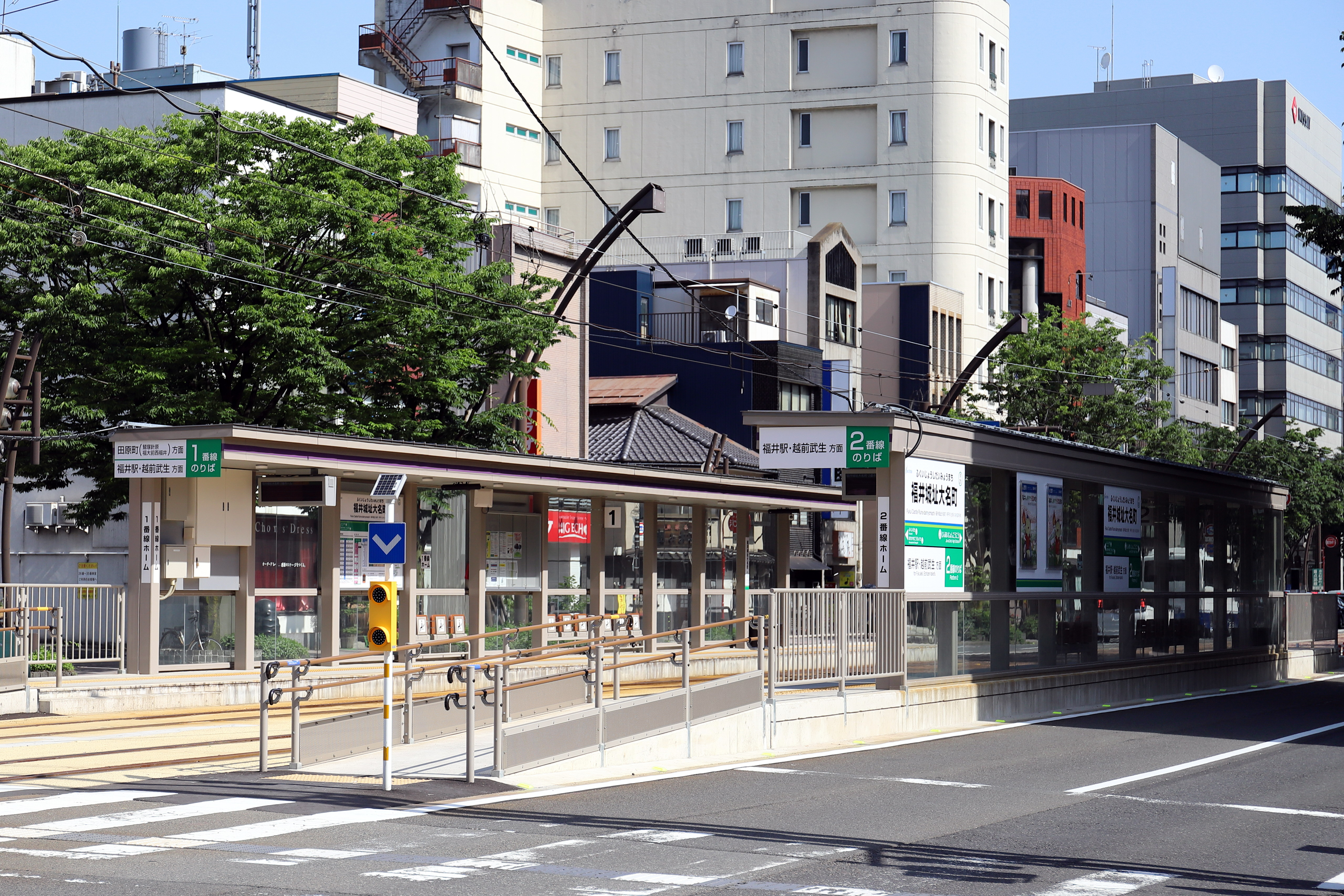
Downtown of Fukui City (2018)

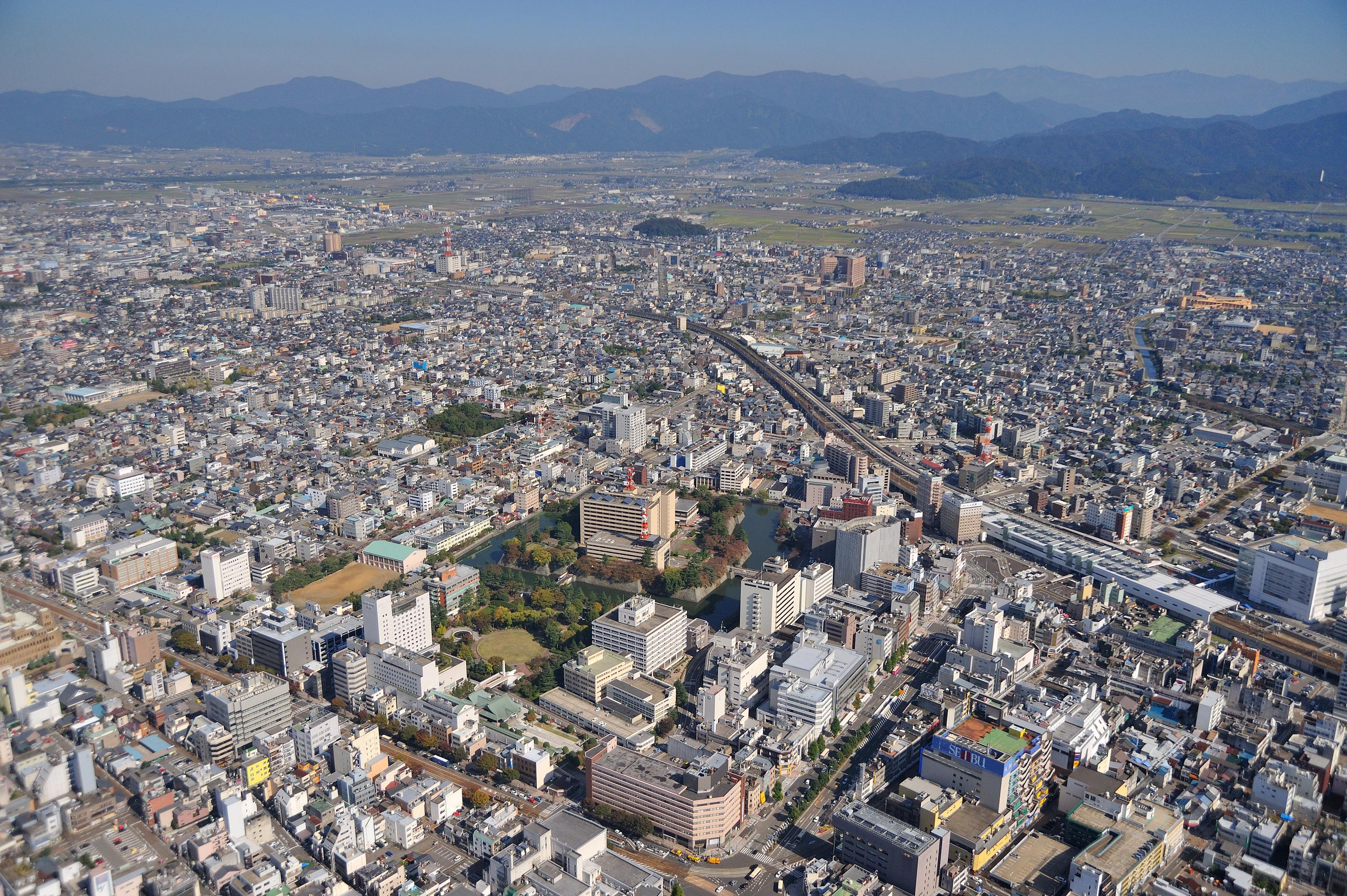
Fukui City Aerial (2014)

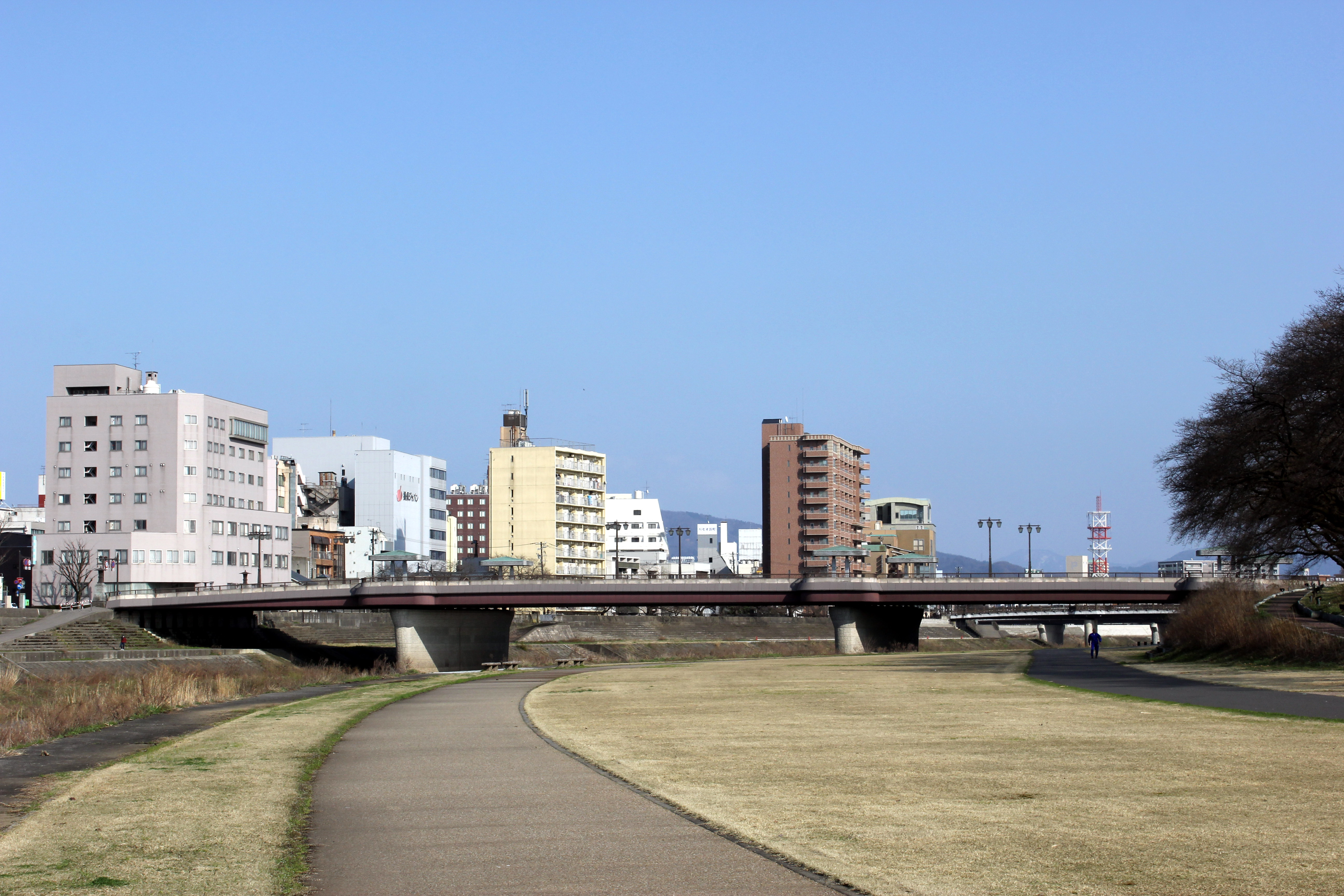
Skyline of Fukui City (2013)

== Geography ==
Fukui is located on the coastal plain in the north-central part of the prefecture. It is bordered by the Sea of Japan to the west and the Ryōhaku Mountains to the east. The Kuzuryū River flows through the city.

=== Climate ===
Fukui has a humid subtropical climate (Köppen climate classification Cfa) with hot, humid summers and cool winters. Precipitation is high throughout the year, and is especially heavy in December and January.

Climate data for Fukui (1991−2020 normals, extremes 1897−present)
Month	Jan	Feb	Mar	Apr	May	Jun	Jul	Aug	Sep	Oct	Nov	Dec	Year
Record high °C (°F)	19.9 (67.8)	21.8 (71.2)	26.6 (79.9)	32.0 (89.6)	34.9 (94.8)	36.6 (97.9)	38.6 (101.5)	38.5 (101.3)	37.7 (99.9)	32.3 (90.1)	28.0 (82.4)	24.6 (76.3)	38.6 (101.5)
Mean maximum °C (°F)	13.1 (55.6)	15.8 (60.4)	20.9 (69.6)	27.0 (80.6)	30.1 (86.2)	32.2 (90.0)	35.3 (95.5)	36.1 (97.0)	33.5 (92.3)	28.6 (83.5)	22.9 (73.2)	17.0 (62.6)	36.4 (97.5)
Mean daily maximum °C (°F)	6.7 (44.1)	7.8 (46.0)	12.2 (54.0)	18.3 (64.9)	23.3 (73.9)	26.5 (79.7)	30.4 (86.7)	32.2 (90.0)	27.7 (81.9)	22.1 (71.8)	16.0 (60.8)	9.8 (49.6)	19.4 (66.9)
Daily mean °C (°F)	3.2 (37.8)	3.7 (38.7)	7.2 (45.0)	12.8 (55.0)	18.1 (64.6)	22.0 (71.6)	26.1 (79.0)	27.4 (81.3)	23.1 (73.6)	17.1 (62.8)	11.3 (52.3)	5.9 (42.6)	14.8 (58.6)
Mean daily minimum °C (°F)	0.5 (32.9)	0.3 (32.5)	2.8 (37.0)	7.8 (46.0)	13.4 (56.1)	18.2 (64.8)	22.7 (72.9)	23.7 (74.7)	19.4 (66.9)	13.1 (55.6)	7.3 (45.1)	2.7 (36.9)	11.0 (51.8)
Mean minimum °C (°F)	−3.2 (26.2)	−3.1 (26.4)	−1.5 (29.3)	1.3 (34.3)	7.3 (45.1)	13.3 (55.9)	19.1 (66.4)	19.5 (67.1)	13.3 (55.9)	6.9 (44.4)	1.9 (35.4)	−1.2 (29.8)	−3.7 (25.3)
Record low °C (°F)	−15.1 (4.8)	−14.3 (6.3)	−9.9 (14.2)	−2.6 (27.3)	1.3 (34.3)	7.3 (45.1)	12.8 (55.0)	13.4 (56.1)	7.7 (45.9)	0.5 (32.9)	−1.5 (29.3)	−11.2 (11.8)	−15.1 (4.8)
Average precipitation mm (inches)	284.9 (11.22)	167.7 (6.60)	160.7 (6.33)	137.2 (5.40)	139.1 (5.48)	152.8 (6.02)	239.8 (9.44)	150.7 (5.93)	212.9 (8.38)	153.8 (6.06)	196.1 (7.72)	304.0 (11.97)	2,299.6 (90.54)
Average snowfall cm (inches)	85 (33)	58 (23)	14 (5.5)	0 (0)	0 (0)	0 (0)	0 (0)	0 (0)	0 (0)	0 (0)	0 (0)	31 (12)	186 (73)
Average precipitation days (≥ 0.5 mm)	24.3	20.0	17.4	13.3	12.0	11.9	13.5	9.9	12.4	13.4	17.5	23.5	189.2
Average relative humidity (%)	82	78	71	68	68	74	76	73	76	76	78	81	75
Mean monthly sunshine hours	65.4	88.4	136.3	172.3	191.1	146.8	155.4	205.7	151.2	154.4	114.4	72.2	1,653.7
Source: Japan Meteorological Agency

Climate data for Koshino, Fukui City (1991−2020 normals, extremes 1978−present)
Month	Jan	Feb	Mar	Apr	May	Jun	Jul	Aug	Sep	Oct	Nov	Dec	Year
Record high °C (°F)	19.8 (67.6)	21.4 (70.5)	25.7 (78.3)	30.5 (86.9)	33.6 (92.5)	36.1 (97.0)	38.2 (100.8)	37.7 (99.9)	36.6 (97.9)	31.1 (88.0)	26.4 (79.5)	22.9 (73.2)	38.2 (100.8)
Mean daily maximum °C (°F)	8.1 (46.6)	8.5 (47.3)	11.9 (53.4)	17.2 (63.0)	22.0 (71.6)	25.0 (77.0)	29.3 (84.7)	30.9 (87.6)	26.8 (80.2)	21.5 (70.7)	16.4 (61.5)	11.1 (52.0)	19.1 (66.3)
Daily mean °C (°F)	5.5 (41.9)	5.5 (41.9)	8.2 (46.8)	13.1 (55.6)	17.8 (64.0)	21.3 (70.3)	25.7 (78.3)	27.2 (81.0)	23.4 (74.1)	18.3 (64.9)	13.3 (55.9)	8.2 (46.8)	15.6 (60.1)
Mean daily minimum °C (°F)	2.9 (37.2)	2.7 (36.9)	4.8 (40.6)	9.2 (48.6)	14.0 (57.2)	18.3 (64.9)	22.8 (73.0)	24.3 (75.7)	20.6 (69.1)	15.6 (60.1)	10.4 (50.7)	5.5 (41.9)	12.6 (54.7)
Record low °C (°F)	−3.8 (25.2)	−4.7 (23.5)	−1.2 (29.8)	0.6 (33.1)	6.9 (44.4)	10.1 (50.2)	16.2 (61.2)	17.6 (63.7)	13.6 (56.5)	6.9 (44.4)	1.5 (34.7)	−1.3 (29.7)	−4.7 (23.5)
Average precipitation mm (inches)	218.4 (8.60)	139.8 (5.50)	156.6 (6.17)	143.0 (5.63)	157.6 (6.20)	157.8 (6.21)	225.7 (8.89)	146.7 (5.78)	230.2 (9.06)	166.1 (6.54)	173.6 (6.83)	253.8 (9.99)	2,169.4 (85.41)
Average precipitation days (≥ 1.0 mm)	23.6	18.3	15.5	12.0	11.3	11.3	12.4	8.7	11.8	11.8	15.7	23.0	175.4
Mean monthly sunshine hours	46.2	72.7	132.9	176.3	194.2	145.9	163.9	215.4	150.4	138.8	96.7	53.8	1,587.3
Source: Japan Meteorological Agency

=== Neighbouring municipalities ===
Fukui Prefecture

- Echizen (town)
- Eiheiji
- Ikeda
- Katsuyama
- Ōno
- Sabae
- Sakai

== Demographics ==
Per Japanese census data, the population of Fukui has remained relatively steady over the past 40 years.

Census data
Year	Pop.	±%
1873	39,784	—
1970	231,901	+482.9%
1980	259,638	+12.0%
1990	270,911	+4.3%
2000	269,557	−0.5%
2010	266,796	−1.0%
2020	262,328	−1.7%
Source: Fukui population statistics, Japanese Imperial Commission (1873)

== History ==
=== Origins ===
Fukui originally consisted of the old provinces of Wakasa and Echizen, before the prefecture was formed in 1871.

During the Edo period, the daimyō of the region was surnamed Matsudaira, and was a descendant of Tokugawa Ieyasu.

=== Sengoku period ===
In 1471, Asakura had displaced the Shiba clan as the shugo military commander of Echizen Province. The same year, Asakura Toshikage (1428–1481) fortified the Ichijōdani by constructing hilltop fortifications on the surrounding mountains and constructing walls and gates to seal off the northern and southern end of the valley. Within this area, he contracted a fortified mansion, surrounded by the homes of his relatives and retainers, and eventually by the residences of merchants and artisans, and Buddhist temples. He offered refuge to people of culture or skills from Kyoto attempting to escape the conflict of the Ōnin War, and the Ichijōdani became a major cultural, military, and population center, and by the time of Asakura Takakage (1493–1548) it had a peak population of over 10,000 inhabitants. Yoshikage succeeded his father as head of the Asakura clan and castle lord of Ichijōdani Castle in 1548.

The Asakura maintained good relations with the Ashikaga shogunate, and thus eventually came into conflict with Oda Nobunaga. Following Nobunaga's capture of Kyoto, Shōgun Ashikaga Yoshiaki appointed Asakura Yoshikage as regent and requested aid in driving Nobunaga out of the capital. As a result, Nobunaga launched an invasion of Echizen Province. Due to Yoshikage's lack of military skill, Nobunaga's forces were successful at the Siege of Kanegasaki and subsequent Battle of Anegawa in 1570, leaving the entire Asakura Domain open to invasion.

Ichijōdani was razed to the ground by Nobunaga during the 1573 Siege of Ichijōdani Castle.

Kitanosho Castle is known, though that it was built by Shibata Katsuie in 1575. Also, it appears that the tenshu (keep) was nine stories high, making it the largest of the time.

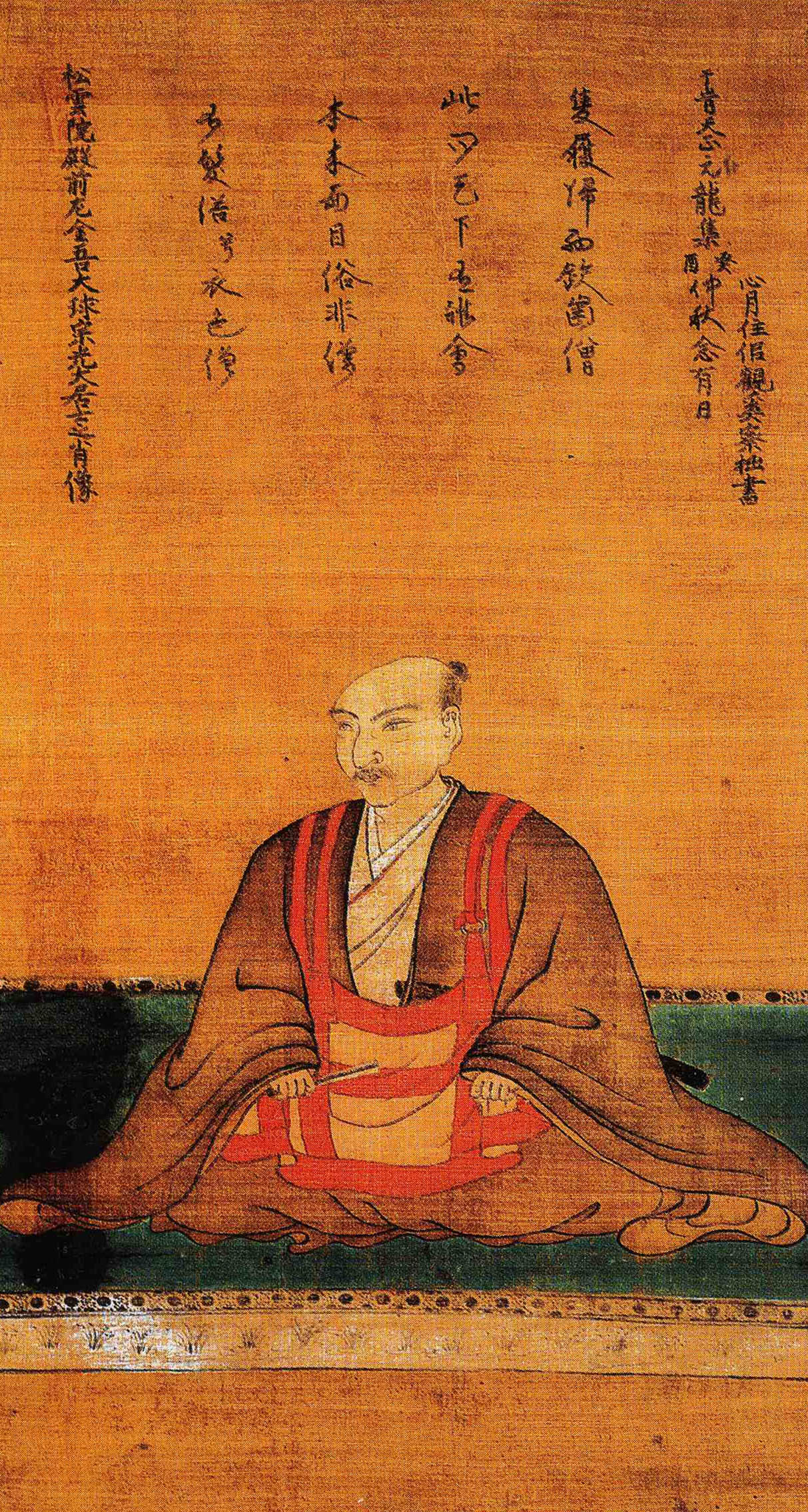
Asakura Yoshikage

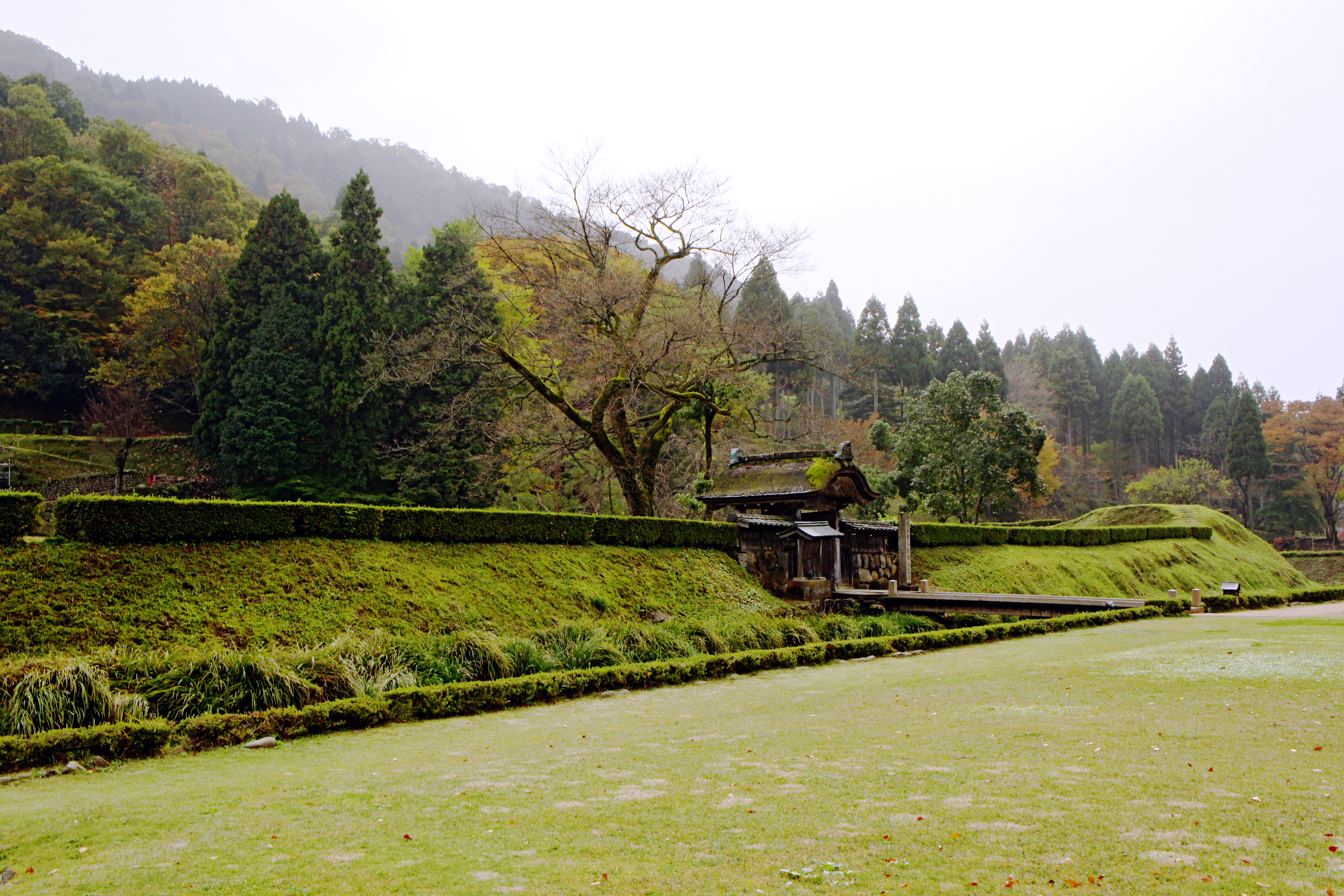
Ichijōdani Asakura Family Historic Ruins

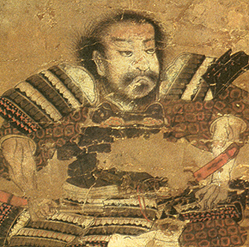
Shibata Katsuie

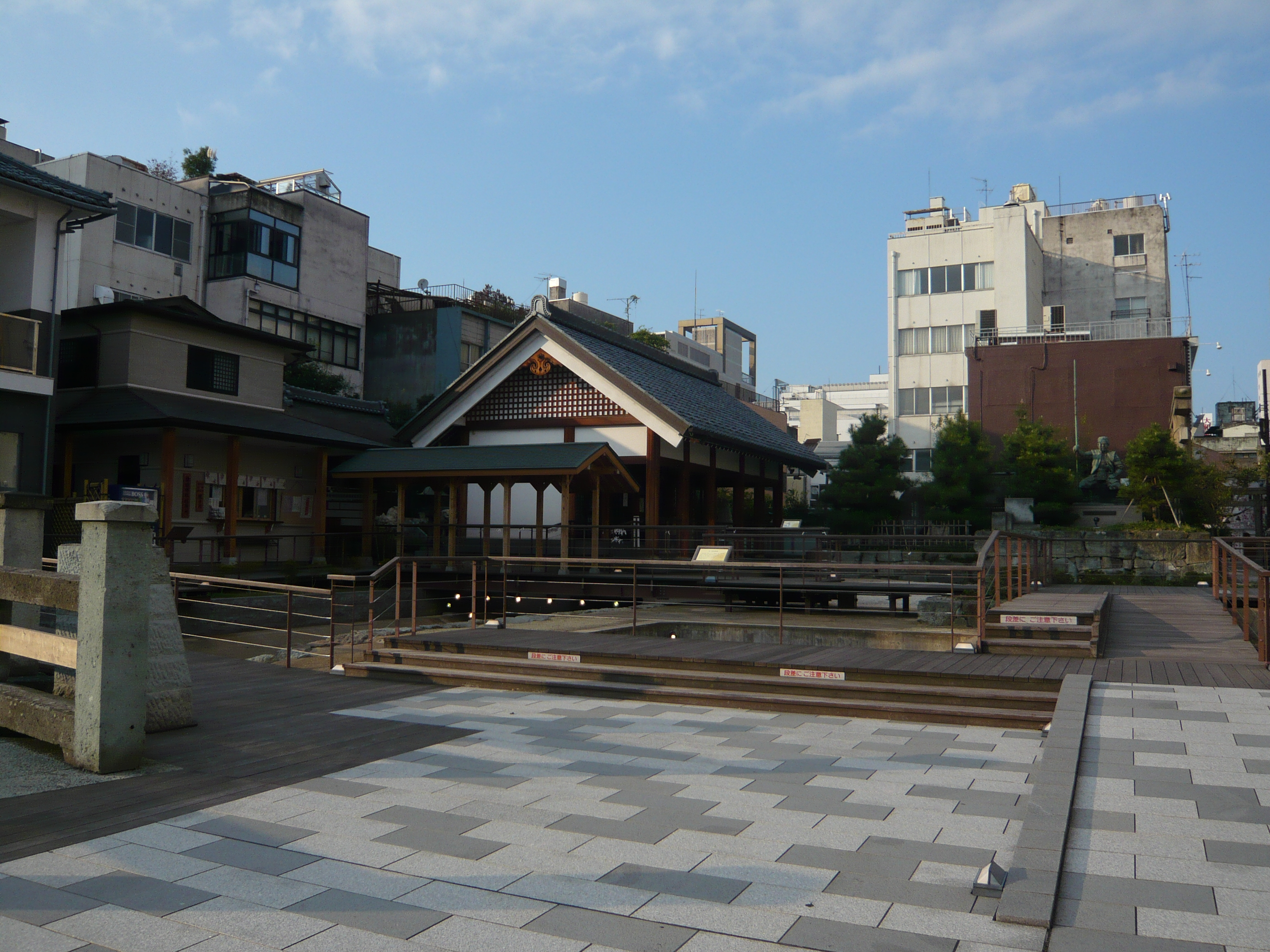
Kitanosho Castle（Sibata Jinja）

=== Edo period ===
Castle town and centre of Fukui Domain during the Edo period Tokugawa shogunate. Fukui Domain played a key role in the Meiji restoration. The modern city of Fukui was founded with the creation of the modern municipalities system on April 1, 1889.

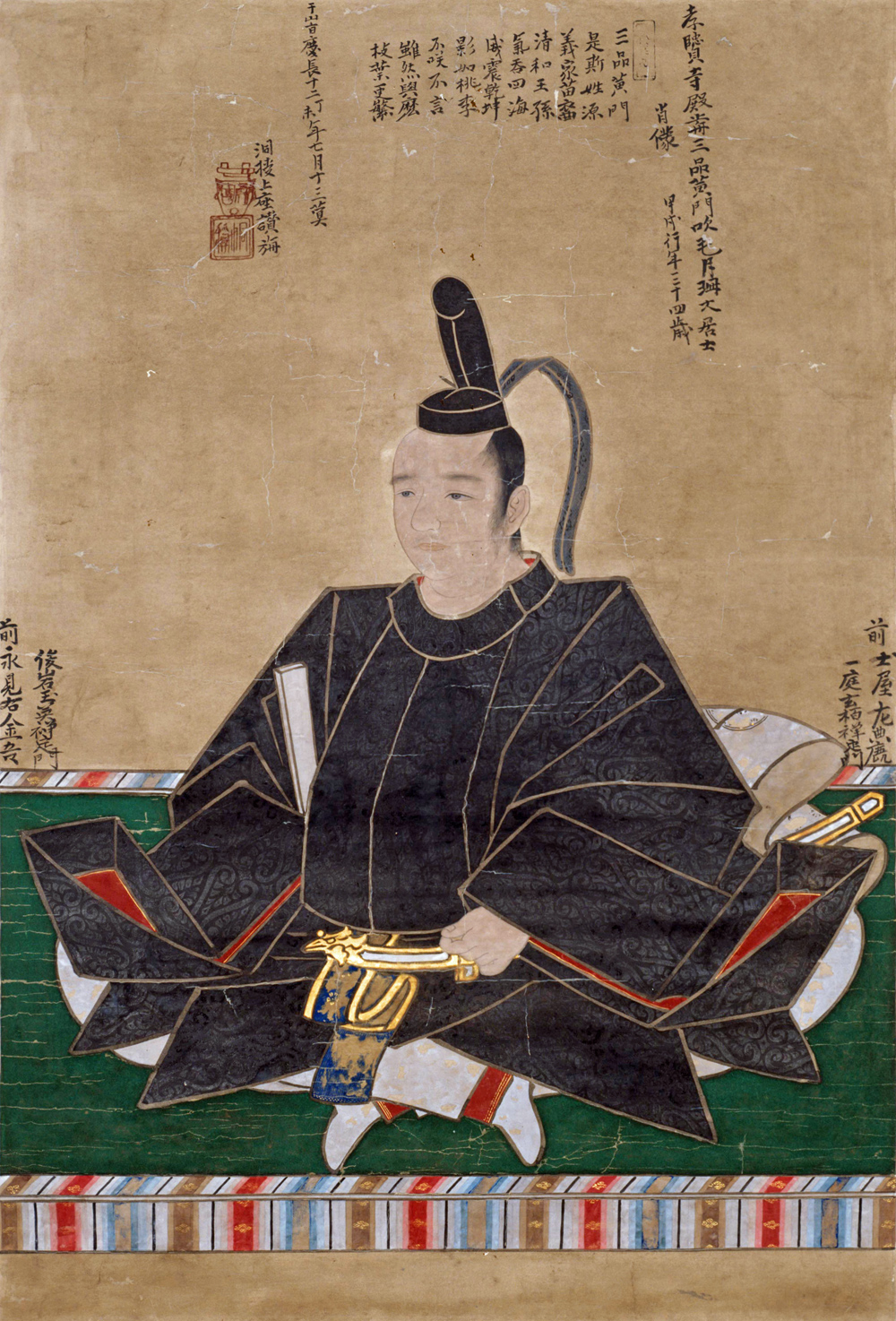
Yūki Hideyasu

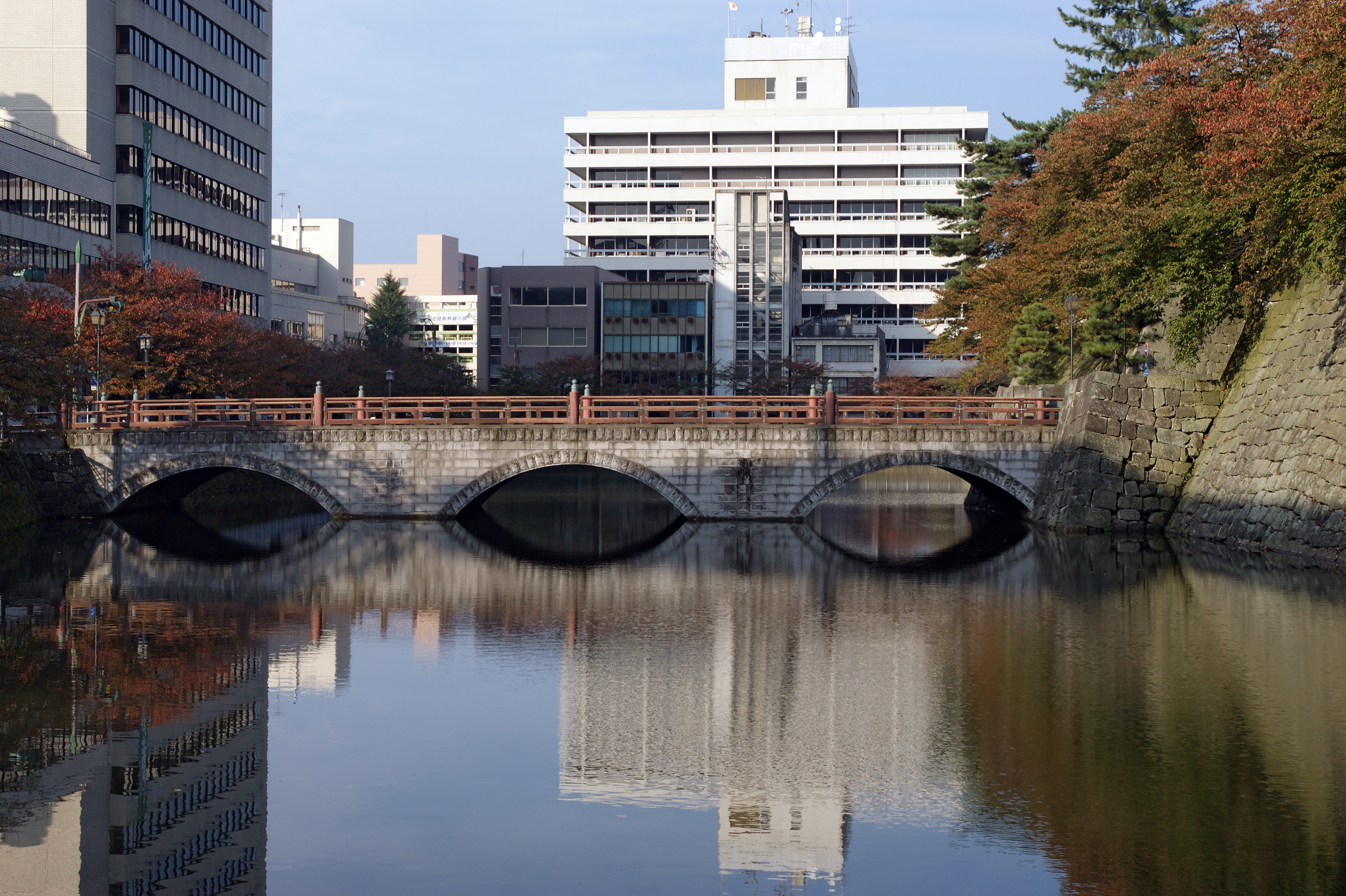
Fukui Castle

=== Meiji, Taisho, and Showa periods ===
During the pre-war period, Fukui grew to become an important industrial and railroad centre. Factories in the area produced aircraft parts, electrical equipment, machine motors, various metal products, and textiles.

Fukui was largely destroyed on June 19, 1945 during the Bombing of Fukui during World War II. Of the city's 1.9 sq mi (4.9 km^{2}) at the time, 84.8% of Fukui was destroyed, per the United States Army Air Forces's Strategic Bombing Survey.

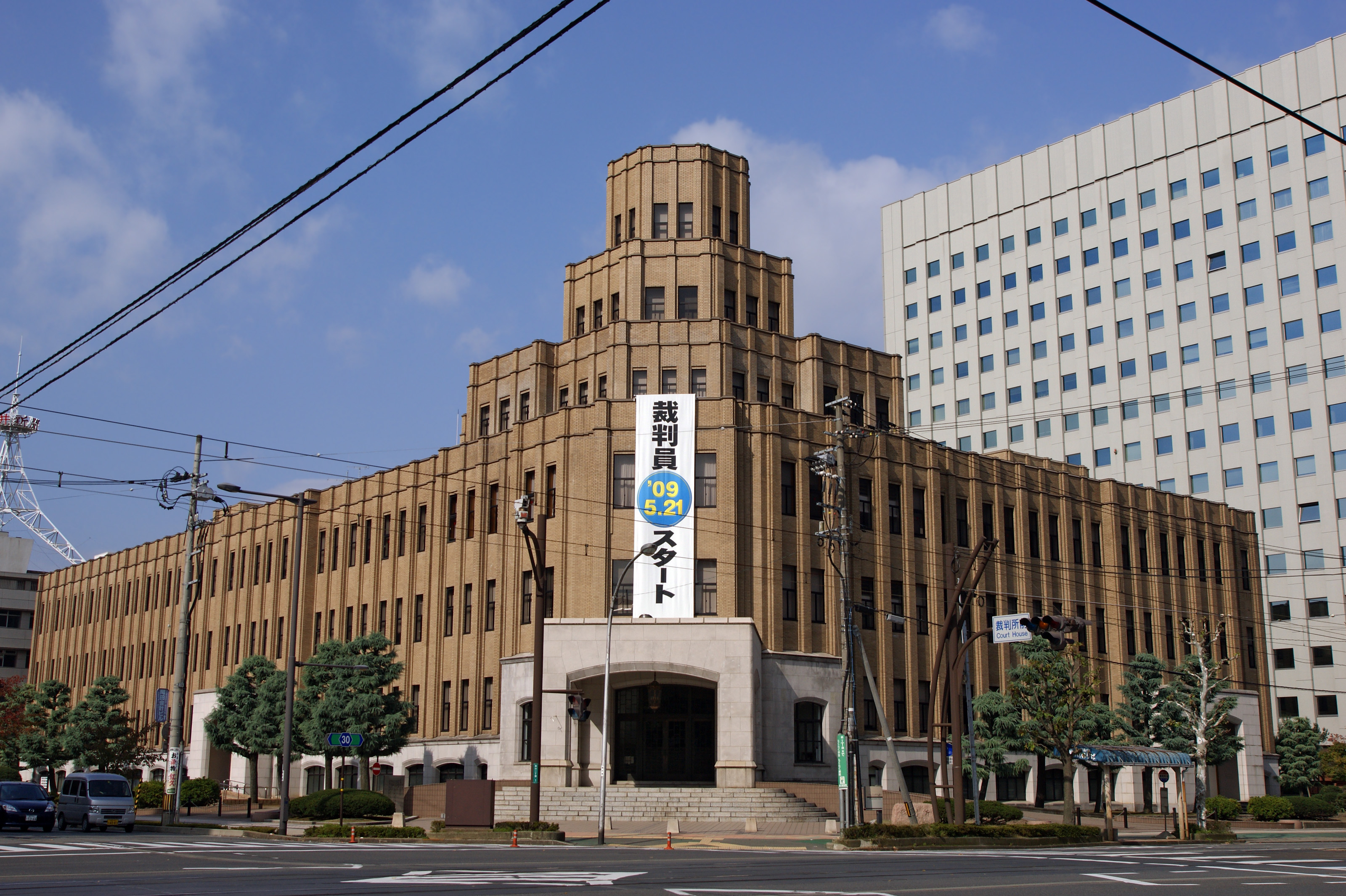
Fukui District Court

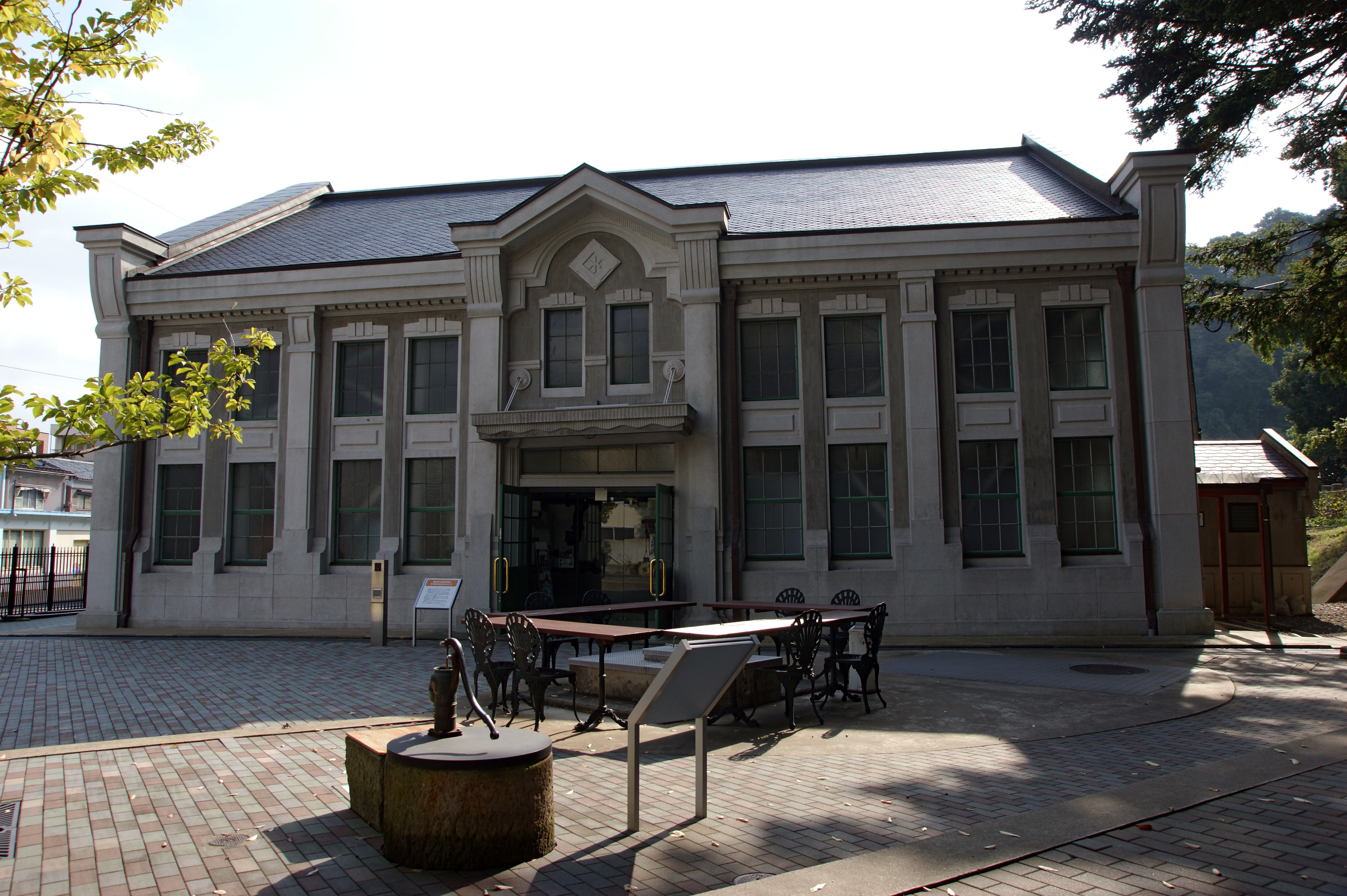
Fukui City Water Service Memorial

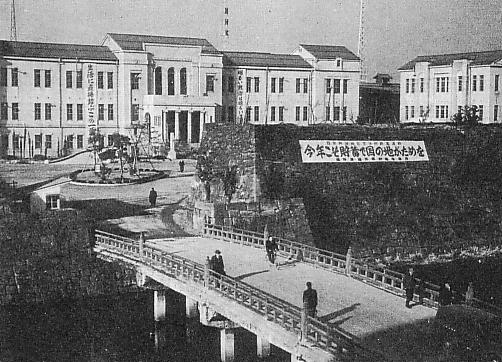
Fukui Prefectural Office Building (1923)

=== Modern Fukui ===
Fukui was again devastated by a major earthquake in 1948.

On February 1, 2006, the town of Miyama (from Asuwa District), the town of Shimizu, and the village of Koshino (both from Nyū District) were merged into Fukui.

Fukui's city status was designated a core city on April 1, 2019.

== Government ==
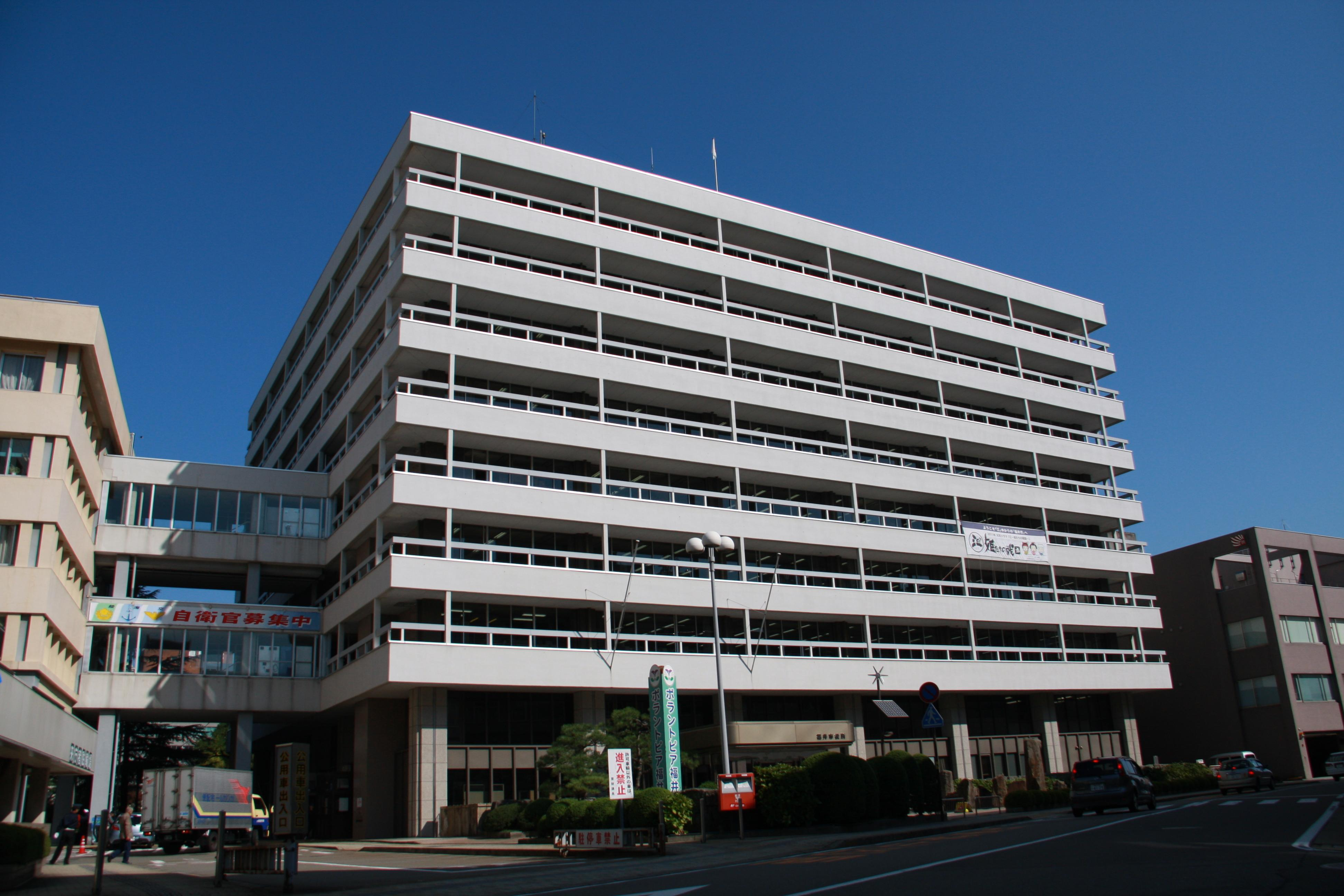
Fukui City Hall

Fukui has a mayor-council form of government with a directly elected mayor and a unicameral city legislature of 32 members. The city also contributes 12 members to the Fukui Prefectural Assembly. In terms of national politics, Fukui forms part of Fukui 1st district, a single-member constituency of the House of Representatives in the national Diet of Japan.

== International relations ==
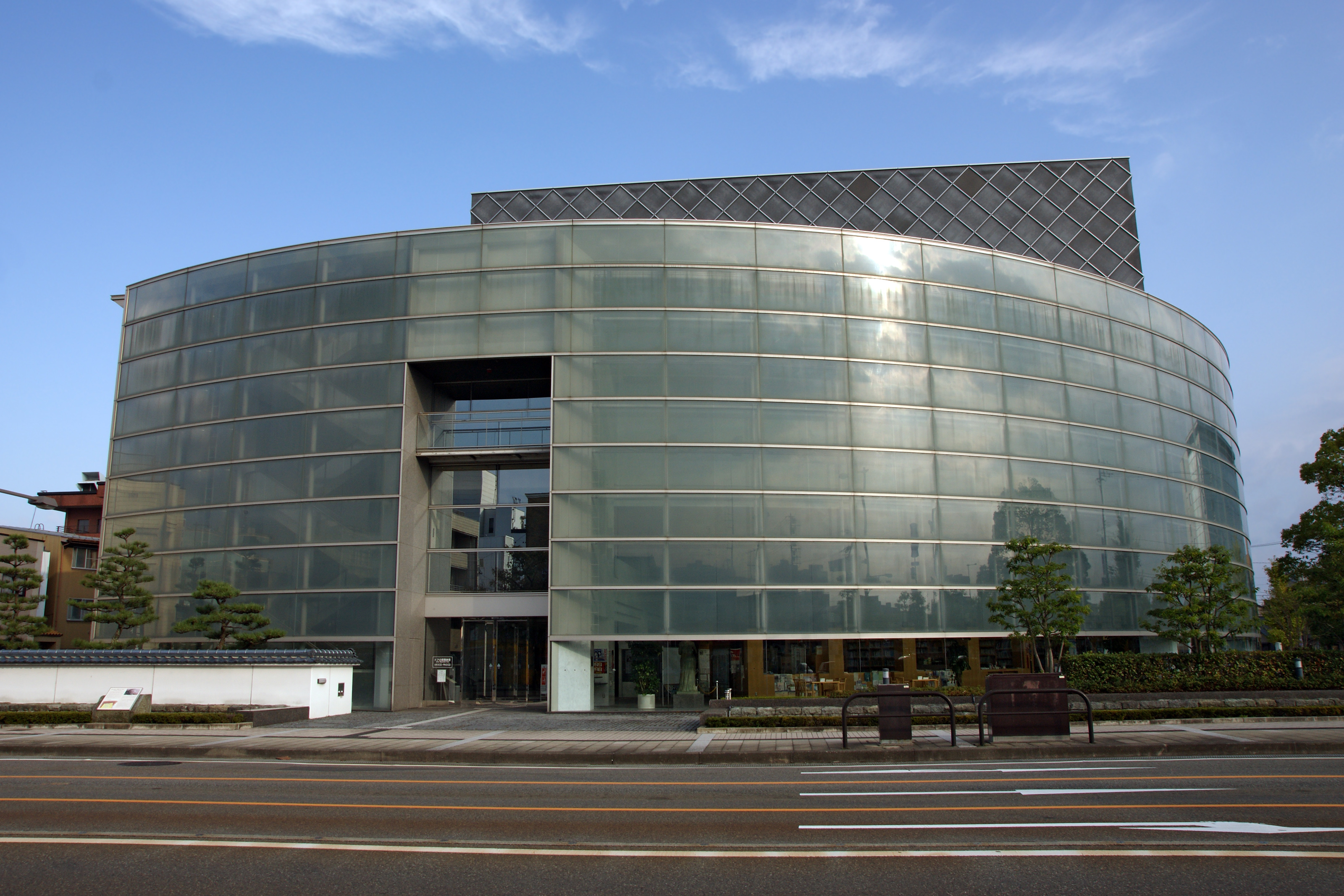
Fukui International Activities Plaza

=== Sister cities ===
==== International ====
Fukui is twinned with:

Sister cities

City	Country	State	since
New Brunswick	United States	New Jersey	May, 1982
Fullerton	United States	California	November, 1989

Friendship cities

City	Country	State	since
(China) Hangzhou	China	(China) Zhejiang	November, 1989
Suwon	South Korea	Gyeonggi	April, 2001

==== National ====
Sister cities

City	Prefecture	region	since
Kumamoto	(Kumamoto Prefecture) Kumamoto	Kyūshū region	November, 1994

Friendship cities

City	Prefecture	region	since
Yūki	(Ibaraki Prefecture) Ibaraki	Kantō region	April, 2002

Partnership cities

City	Prefecture	region	since
Nagano	(Nagano Prefecture) Nagano	Chūbu region	August 9, 2013

== Economy ==
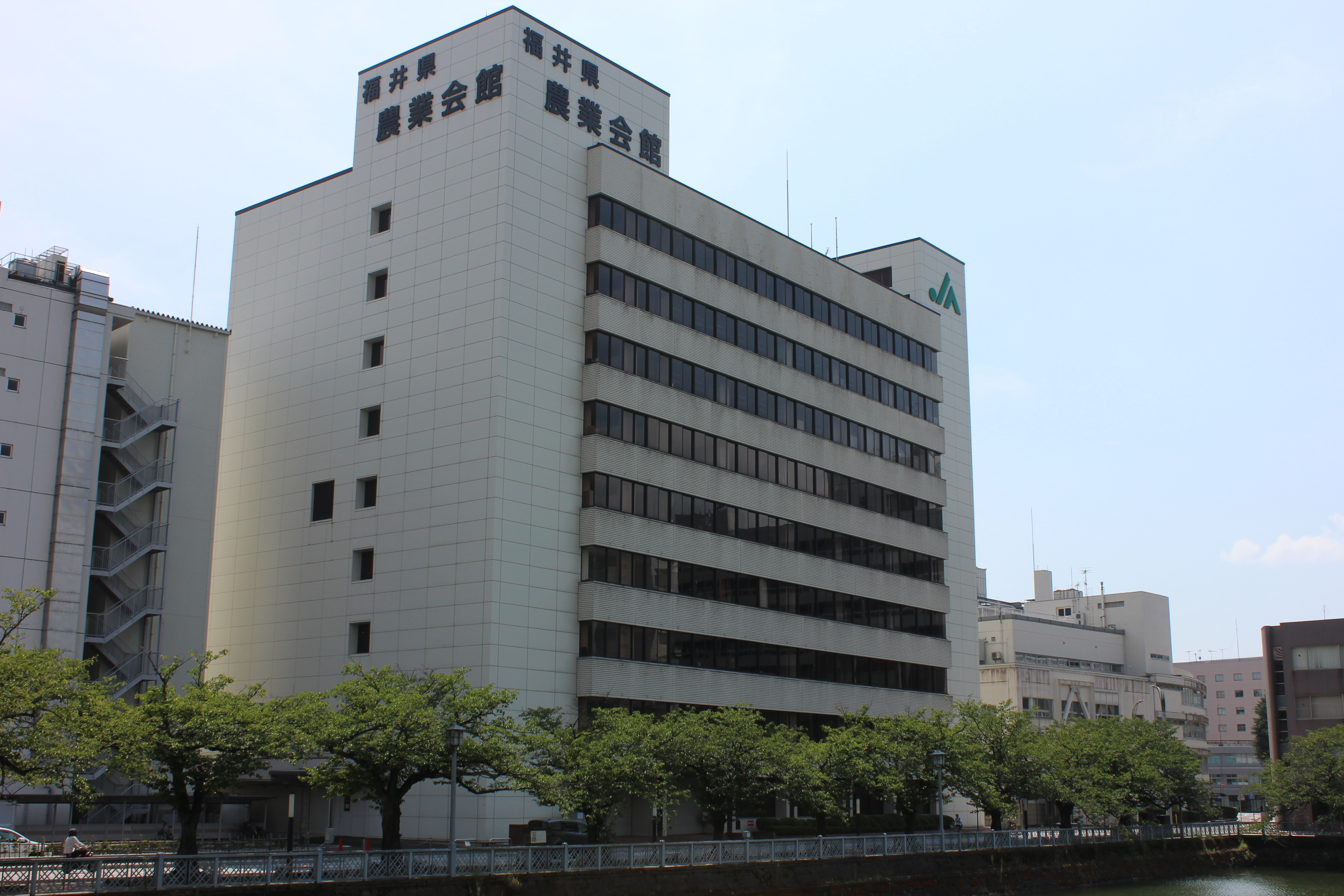
Fukui Prefecture Agricultural Cooperatives

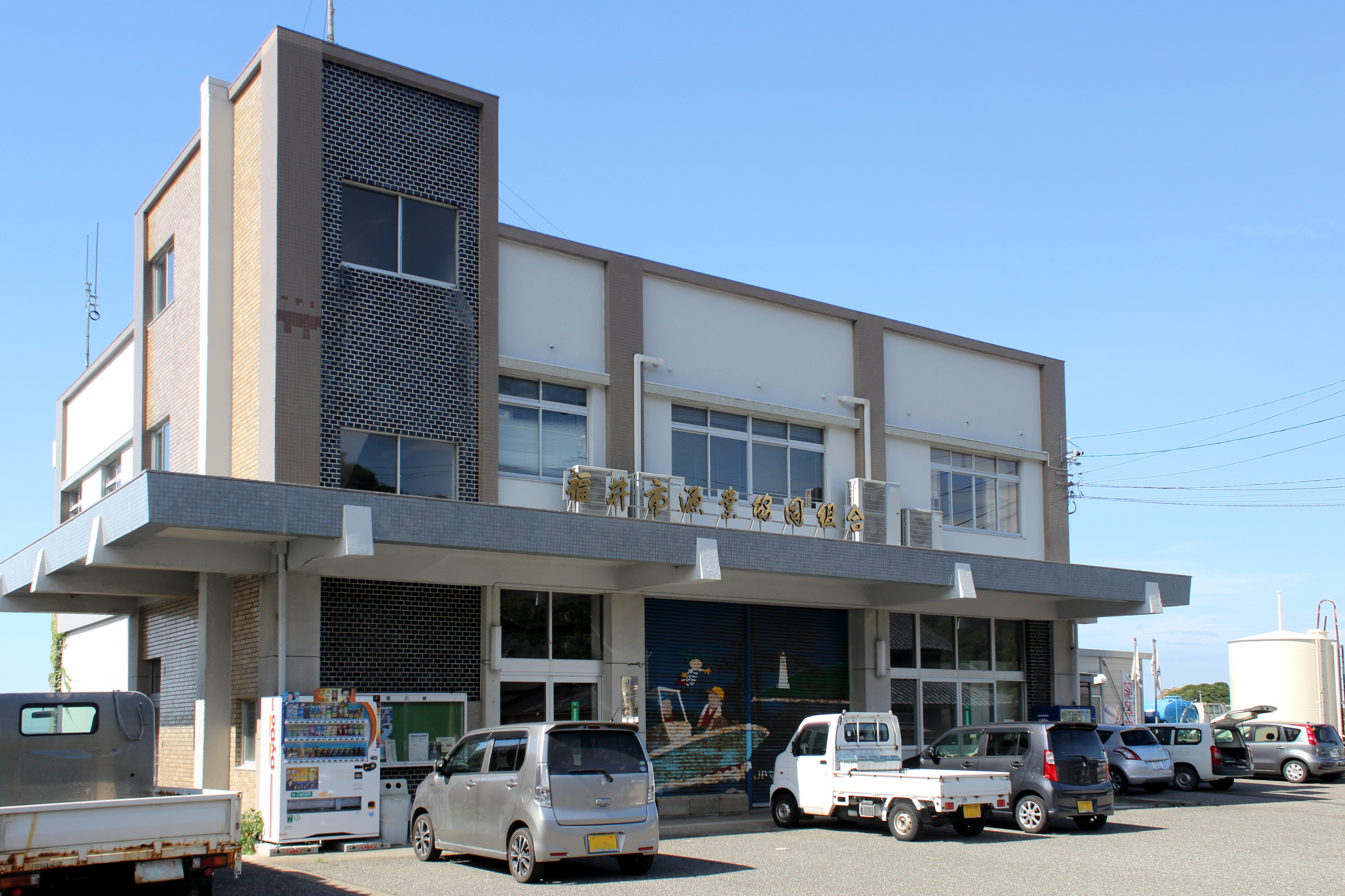
Fisheries Cooperative Association of FukuiCity

The economy of Fukui is mixed. The city is a regional commercial and finance centre; however, manufacturing, agriculture and commercial fishing also are contributors to the local economy.

=== Primary sector of the economy ===
==== Agriculture ====
Japan Agricultural Cooperatives (JA)

- Fukui Prefecture Agricultural Cooperatives (JA FukuiPrefecture)

==== Fishing industry ====
Japan Fisheries cooperative (JF)

- FukuiCity Fisheries cooperative (JF FukuiCity)

=== Secondary sector of industry ===
==== Manufacturing industry ====
Fukui is home to several companies, including:

- Kumagai Gumi, a large general construction company, was founded and has its registered head office in the city.
- Matsuura Machinery, an international heavy machinery manufacturing company
- Morinaga Hokuriku Dairy, a dairy products subsidiary of Morinaga Milk Industry

=== Tertiary sector of industry ===
==== Service industry ====
- Emori Shoji, a trading house with strong ties to China
- Keifuku Bus

== Education ==
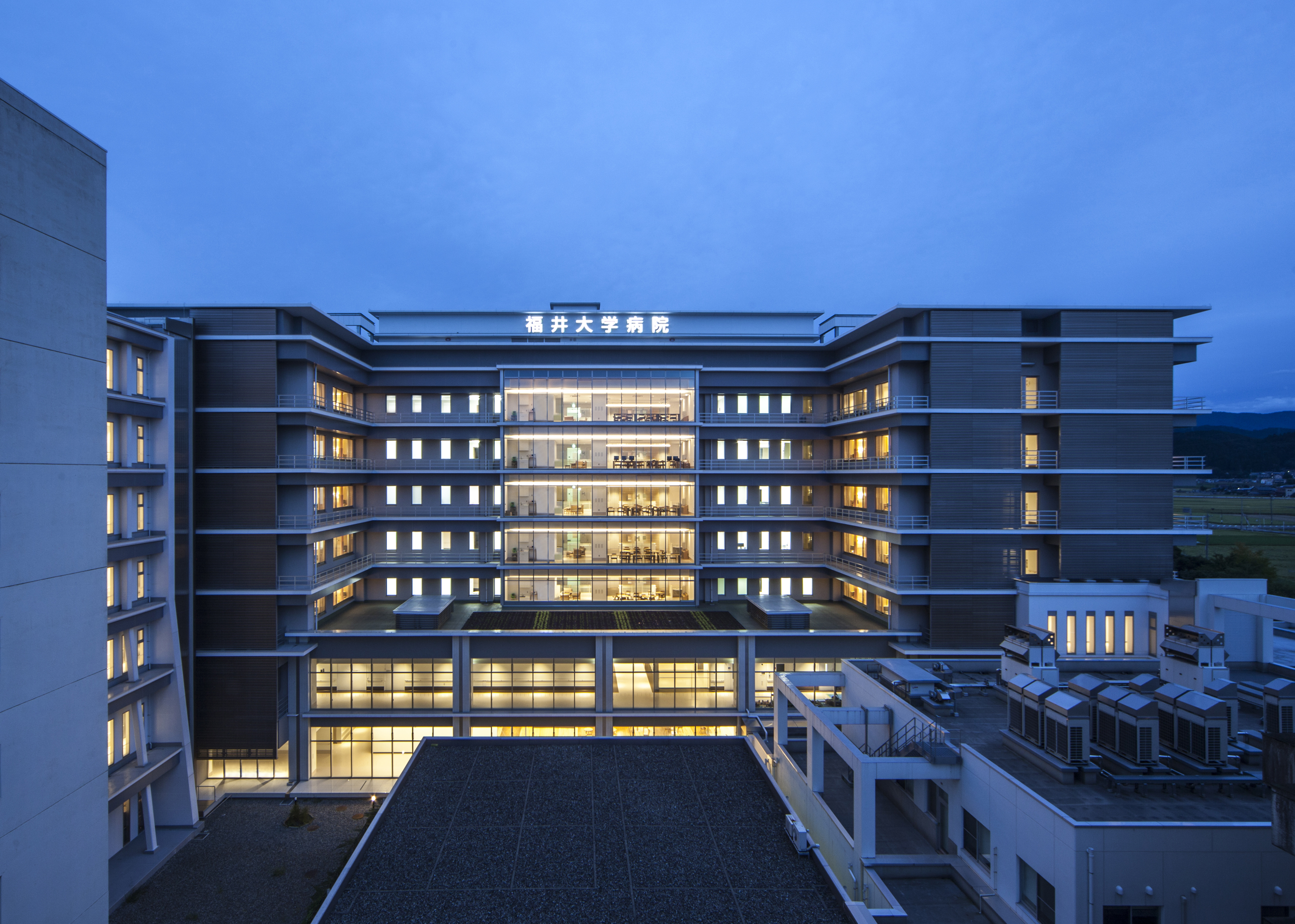
University of Fukui

=== Universities and colleges ===
- Fukui College of Health Sciences
- Fukui Prefectural University
- Fukui University of Technology
- Jin-ai Women's College
- University of Fukui

=== Secondary schools ===
- Asuwa Senior High School
- Fujishima Senior High School
- Fukui Commercial Senior High School
- Fukui Minami Senior High School
- Fukui Norin Senior High School
- Fukui University of Technology - Fukui Senior High School
- Hokuriku Senior High School
- Jin-ai Girl's Senior High School
- Kagaku-Gijutsu Senior High School
- Keishin Senior High School
- Koshi Senior High School
- Michimori Senior High School
- Usui Senior High School

=== Other schools ===
- Fukui Prefectural School for the Blind
- Fukui Prefectural School for the Deaf
- A North Korean school: Hokuriku Korean Elementary and Junior High School (北陸朝鮮初中級学校).

== Transport ==
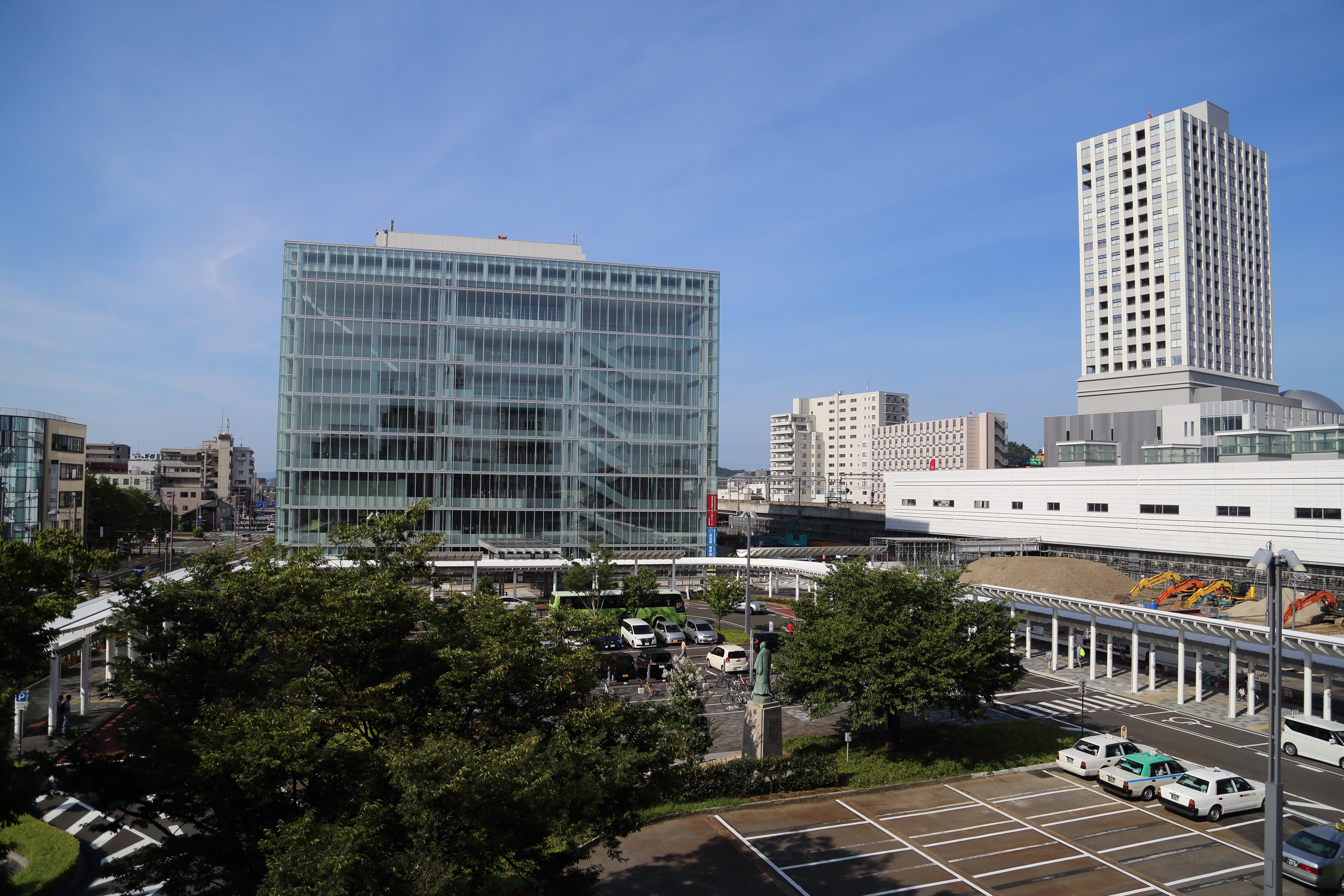
Fukui Station

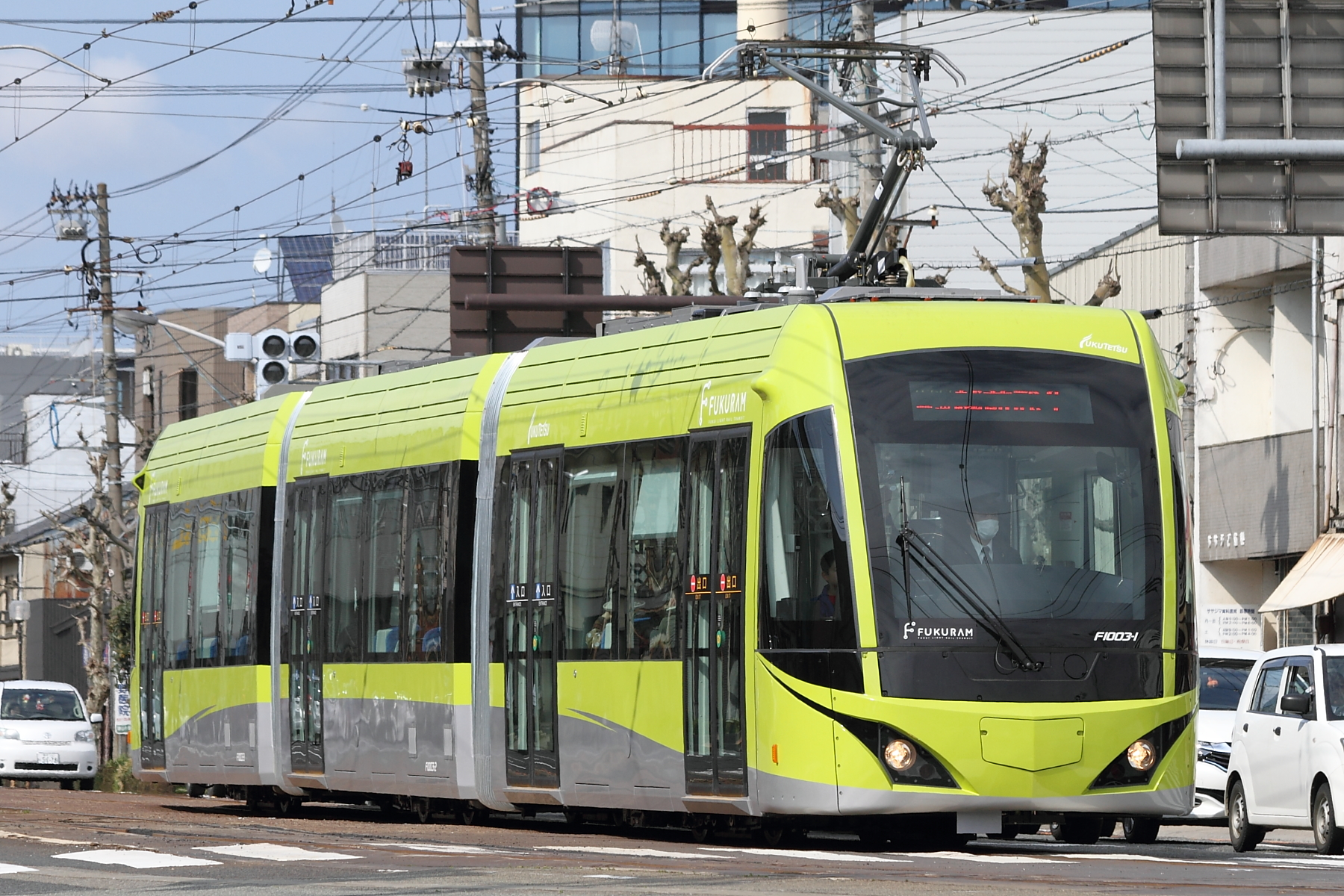
Fukui Railway Fukubu Line

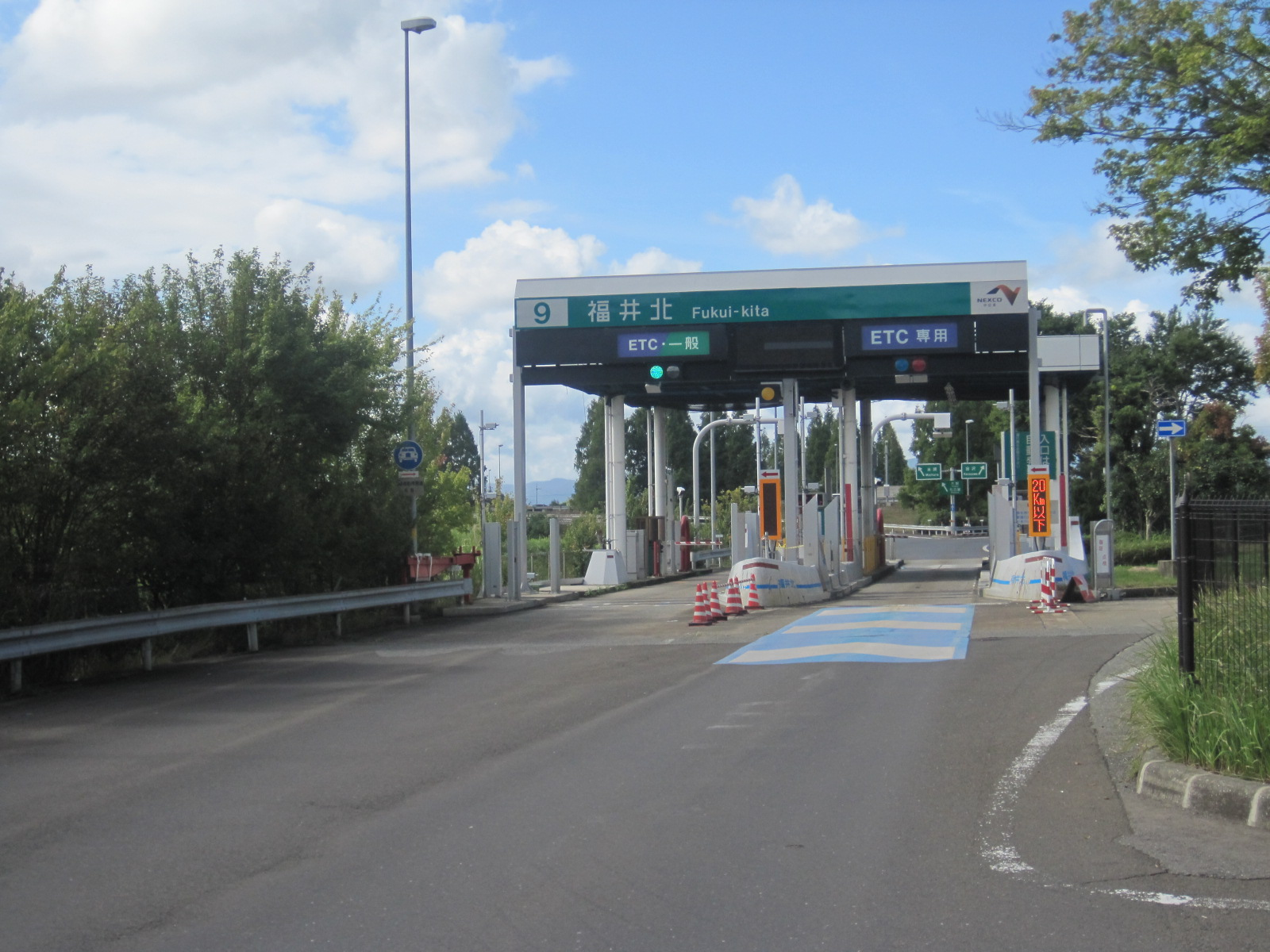
Fukui-kita IC （Hokuriku Expressway）

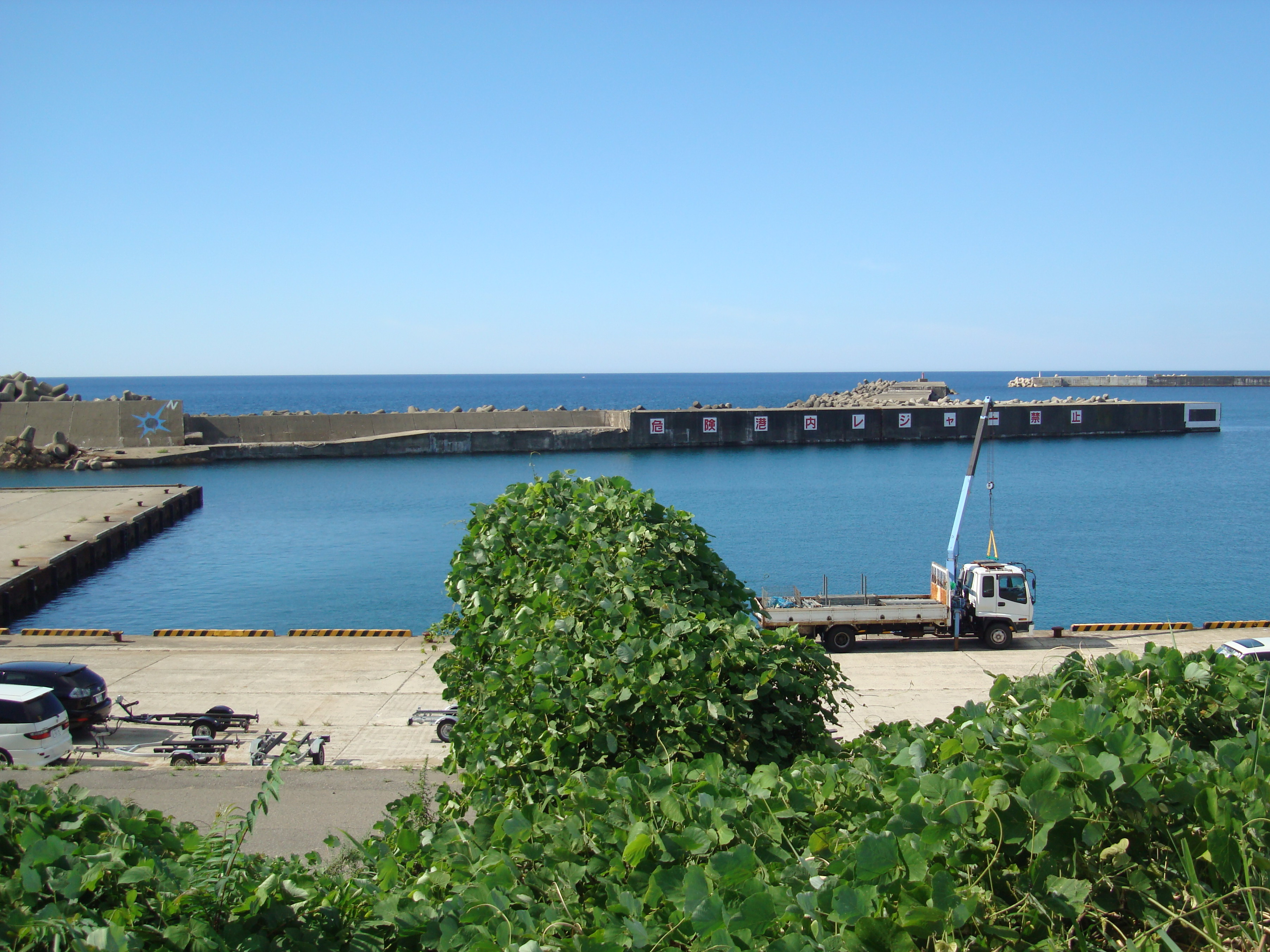
Port of Takasu

=== Railways ===
==== High-speed rail ====
West Japan Railway Company (JR West)

Shinkansen service began on 16 March 2024, when the route was extended from Kanazawa in Ishikawa, north of Fukui Prefecture, to Tsuruga in the south of Fukui.

- Hokuriku Shinkansen

==== Conventional lines ====
West Japan Railway Company (JR West)

- Etsumi-Hoku Line (Kuzuryū Line): Echizen-Hanandō - Rokujō - Asuwa - Echizen-Tōgō - Ichijōdani - Echizen-Takada - Ichinami - Kowashōzu - Miyama - Echizen-Yakushi - Echizen-Ōmiya - Hakariishi

Fukui Railway

- Fukubu Line: Sanjūhassha - Taichō no Sato - Asōzu - Harmony Hall - Seimei - Ebata - Bell-mae - Hanandō - Sekijūjimae - Shokokaigisho-mae - Asuwayama-Koenguchi - Fukui Castle Ruins-daimyomachi - Jin'ai Joshikōkō - Tawaramachi

Echizen Railway

- Mikuni Awara: Fukui - Shin-Fukui - Fukuiguchi - Matsumoto Machiya - Nishi-Betsuin - Tawaramachi - Fukudaimae-Nishi-Fukui - Nikkakagaku-Mae - Yatsushima - Nittazuka - Nakatsuno - Jin'ai Ground-Mae - Washizuka-Haribara
- Katsuyama Eiheiji Line: Fukui - Shin-Fukui - Fukuiguchi - Echizen-Kaihotsu - Echizen-Shinbo - Oiwakeguchi - Higashi-Fujishima - Echizen-Shimabashi

Hapi-Line Fukui

- Hapi-Line Fukui: Ōdoro - Echizen-Hanandō - Fukui - Morita

Service on the third-sector line formerly belonging to JR West began operations on 16 March 2024 when the Hokuriku Shinkansen was extended to Tsuruga.

=== Roads ===
==== Expressways ====
- Hokuriku Expressway

==== Japan National Route ====
- National Route 8
- National Route 158
- National Route 305
- National Route 364
- National Route 416

=== Air ===
The city does not have its own commercial airport. The nearest airport is served by Komatsu Airport which is located 55 km north of Fukui.

=== Seaways ===
==== Sea Port ====
- Port of Takasu

== Visitor attractions ==
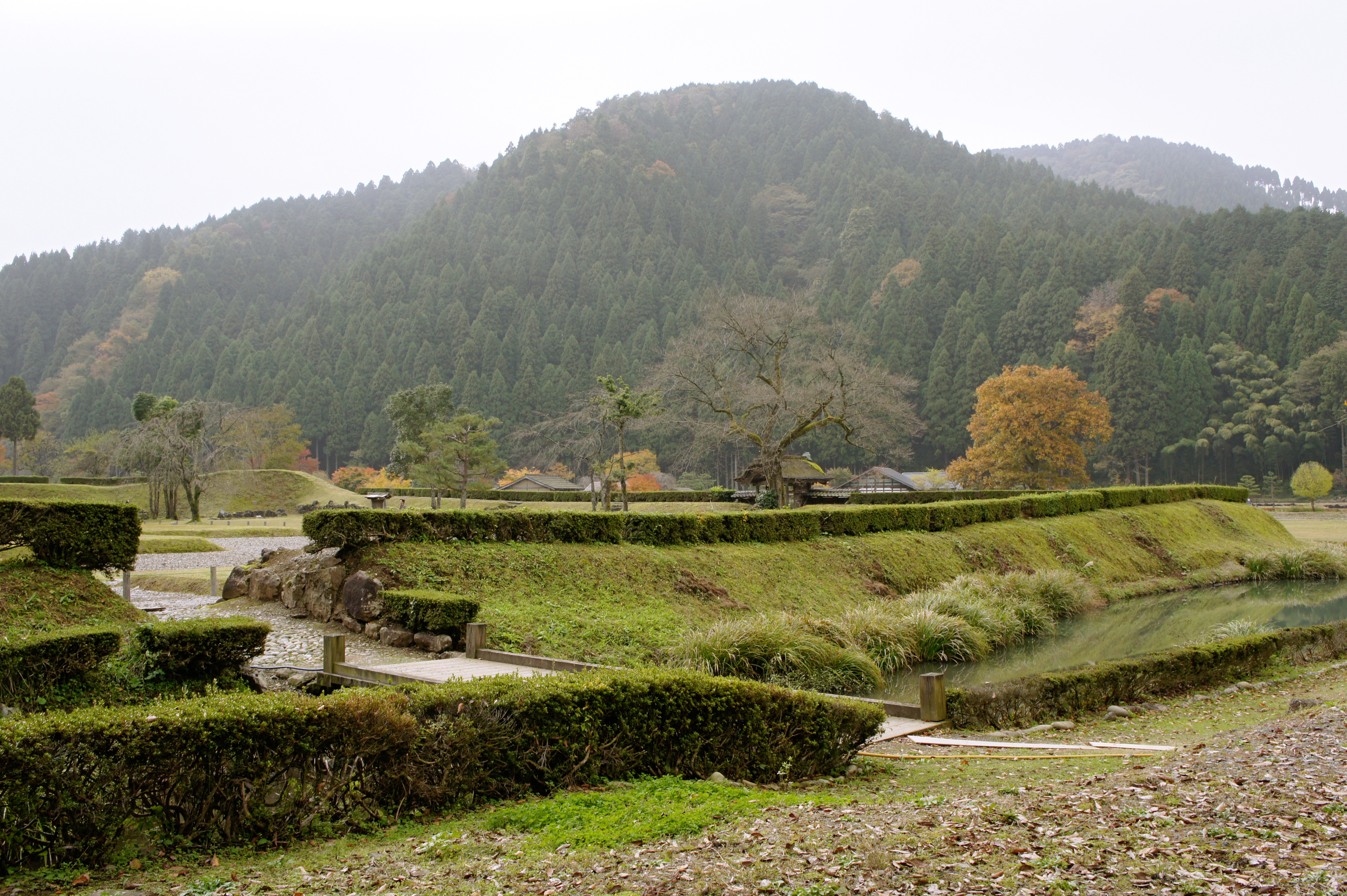
Ichijōdani Asakura Family Historic Ruins

- Asuwa River
- Fukui International Activities Plaza
- Harmony Hall Fukui
- Ichijōdani Asakura Family Historic Ruins, one of the most important cultural heritage sites in Japan
- Fukui Castle
- Fukui Fine Arts Museum
- Kitanosho Castle
- Peace Pagoda, the second of its kind in the world, inaugurated in 1959
- Yōkōkan Garden
- "Yoroppaken", creator of Fukui's trademark dish, sauce katsudon (ソースカツ丼)
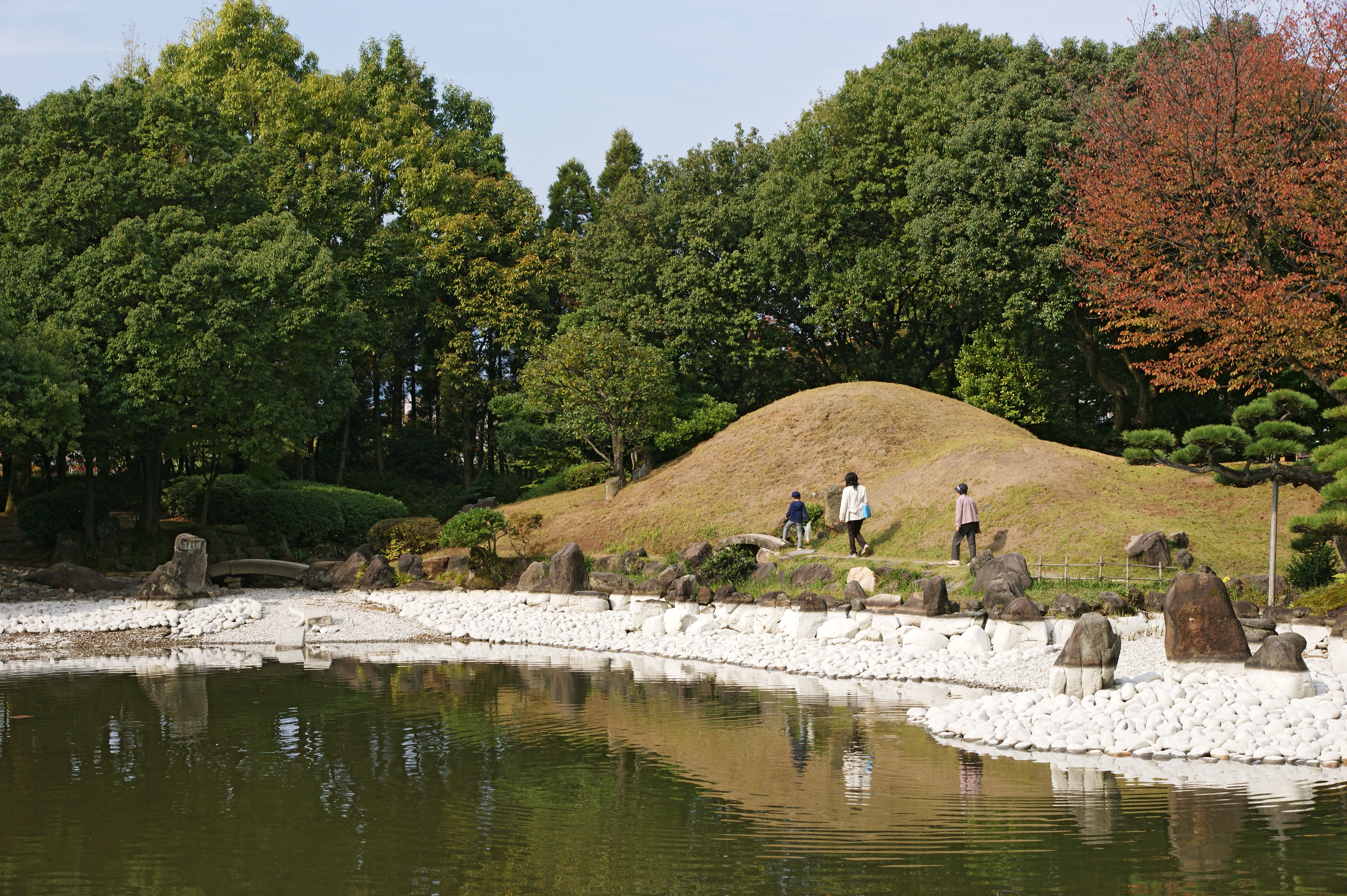
Yōkōkan Garden

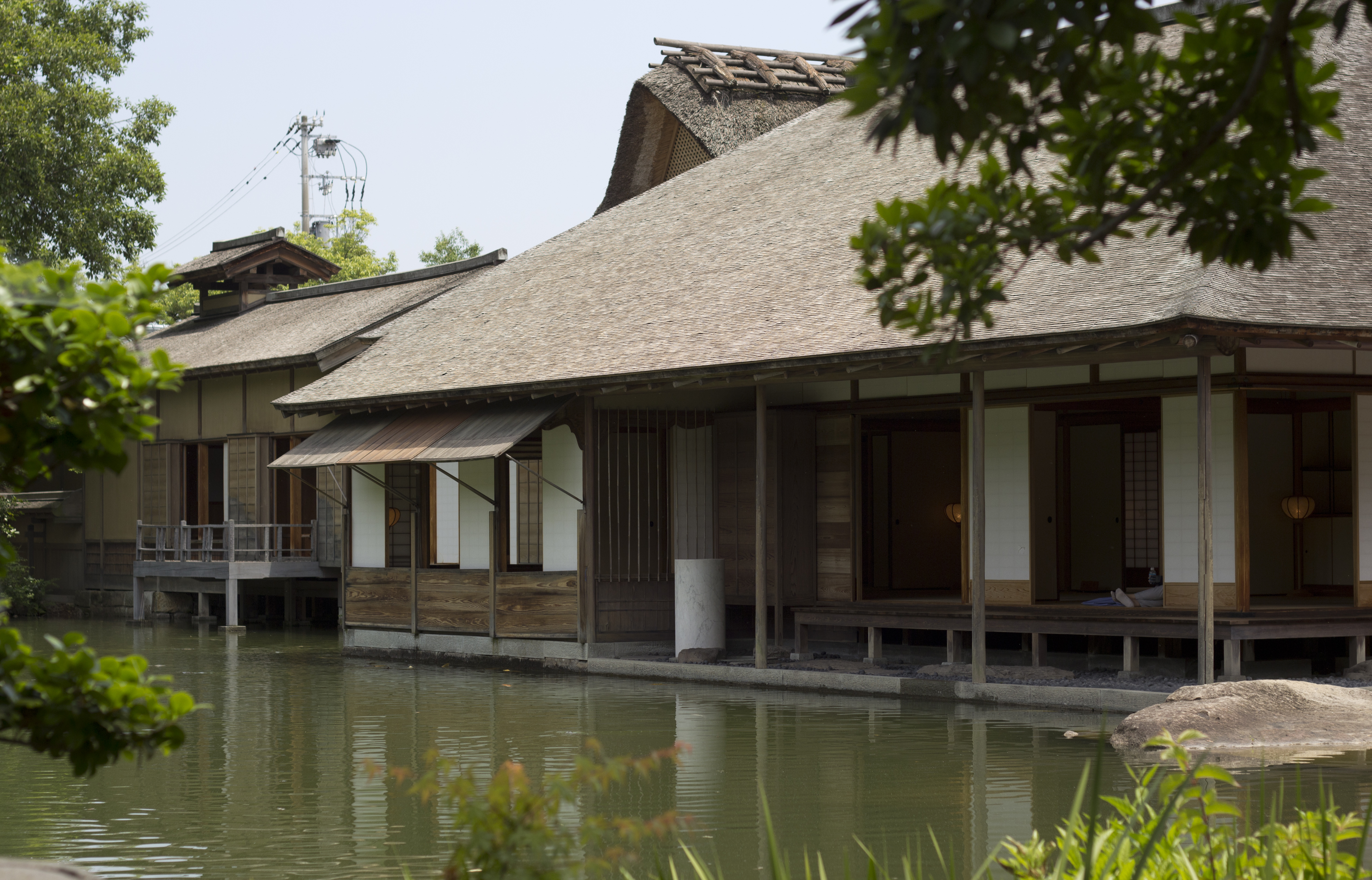
The Yōkōkan Kantei

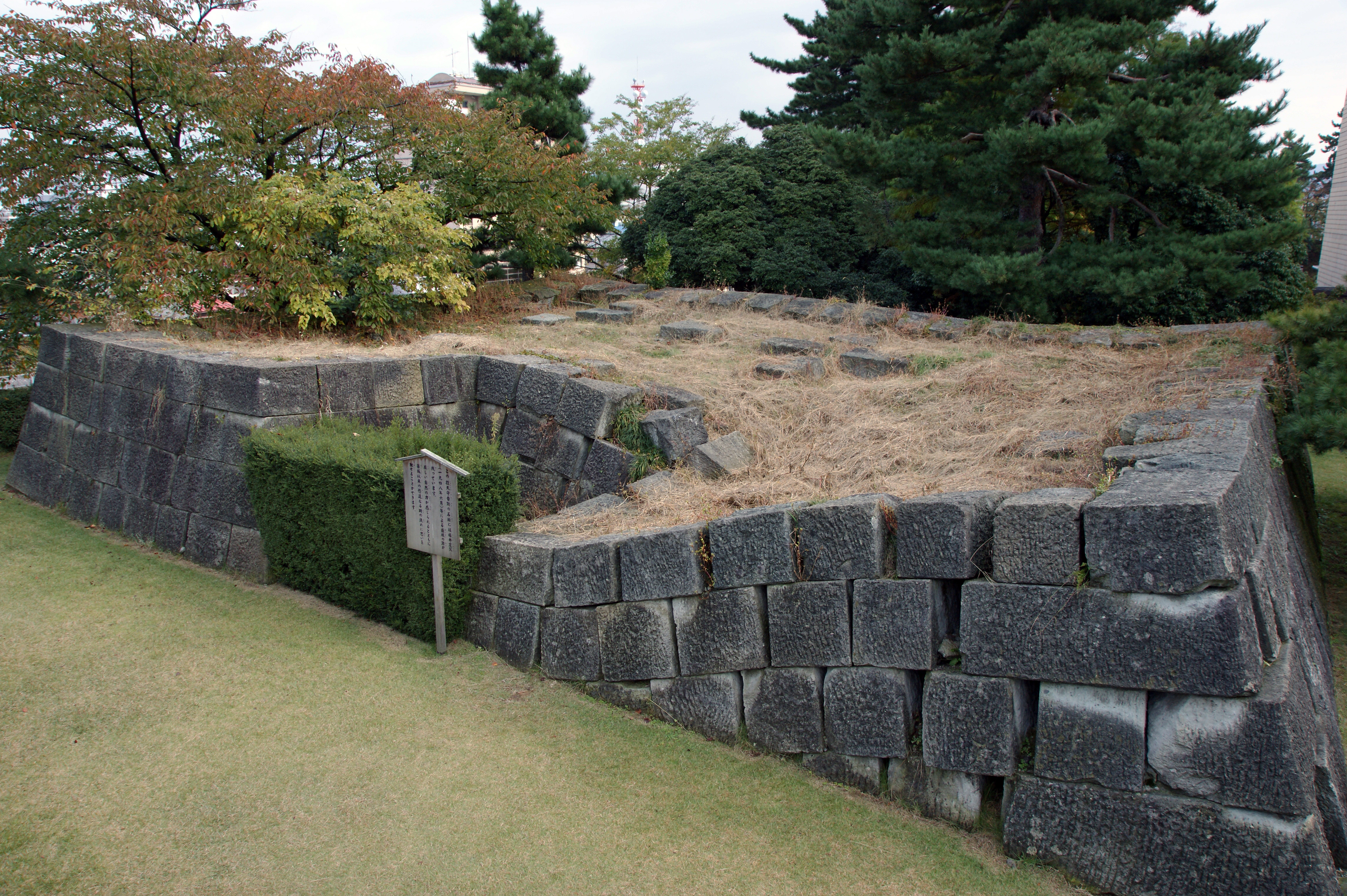
Fukui Castle

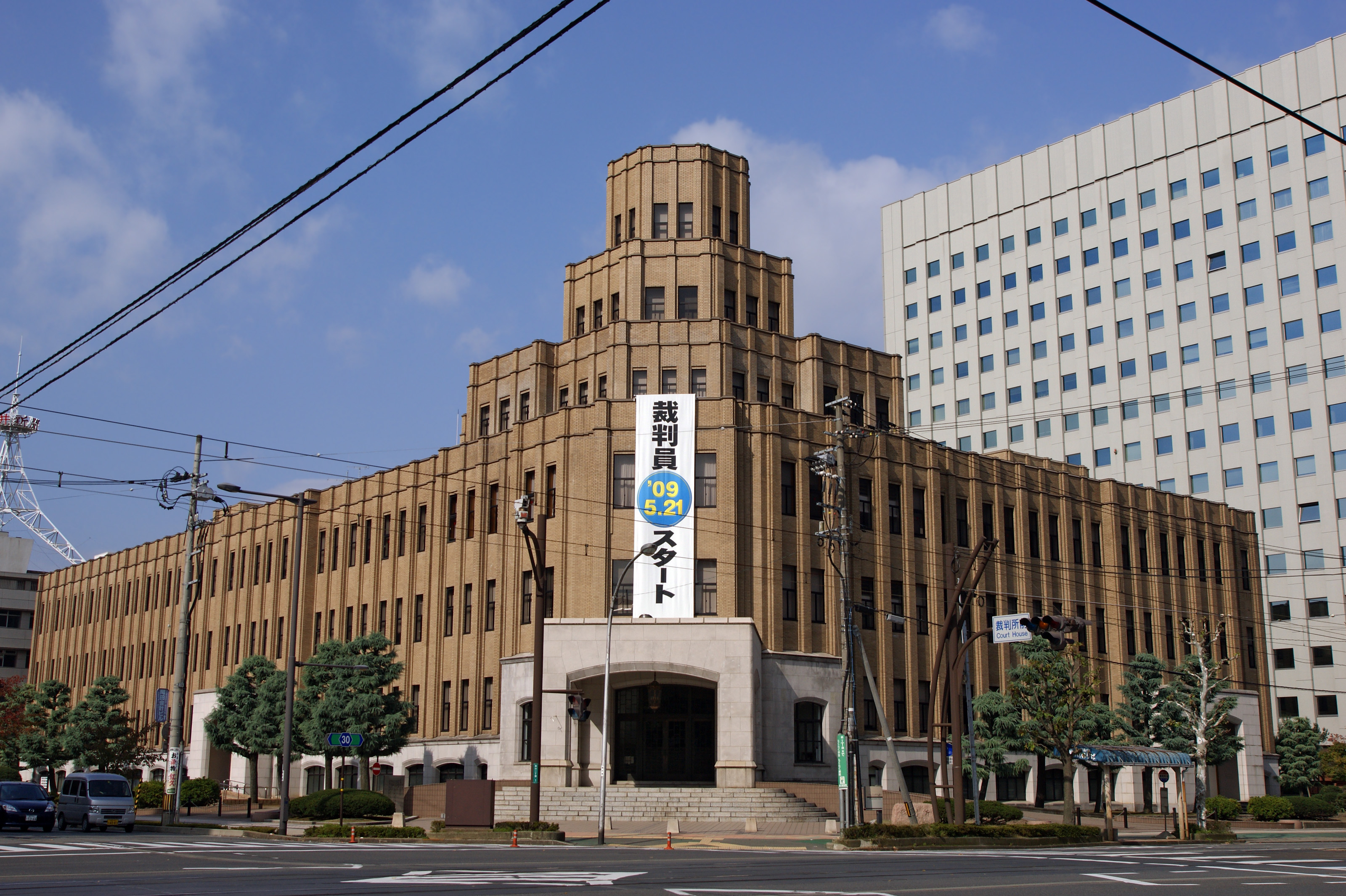
Fukui District Court

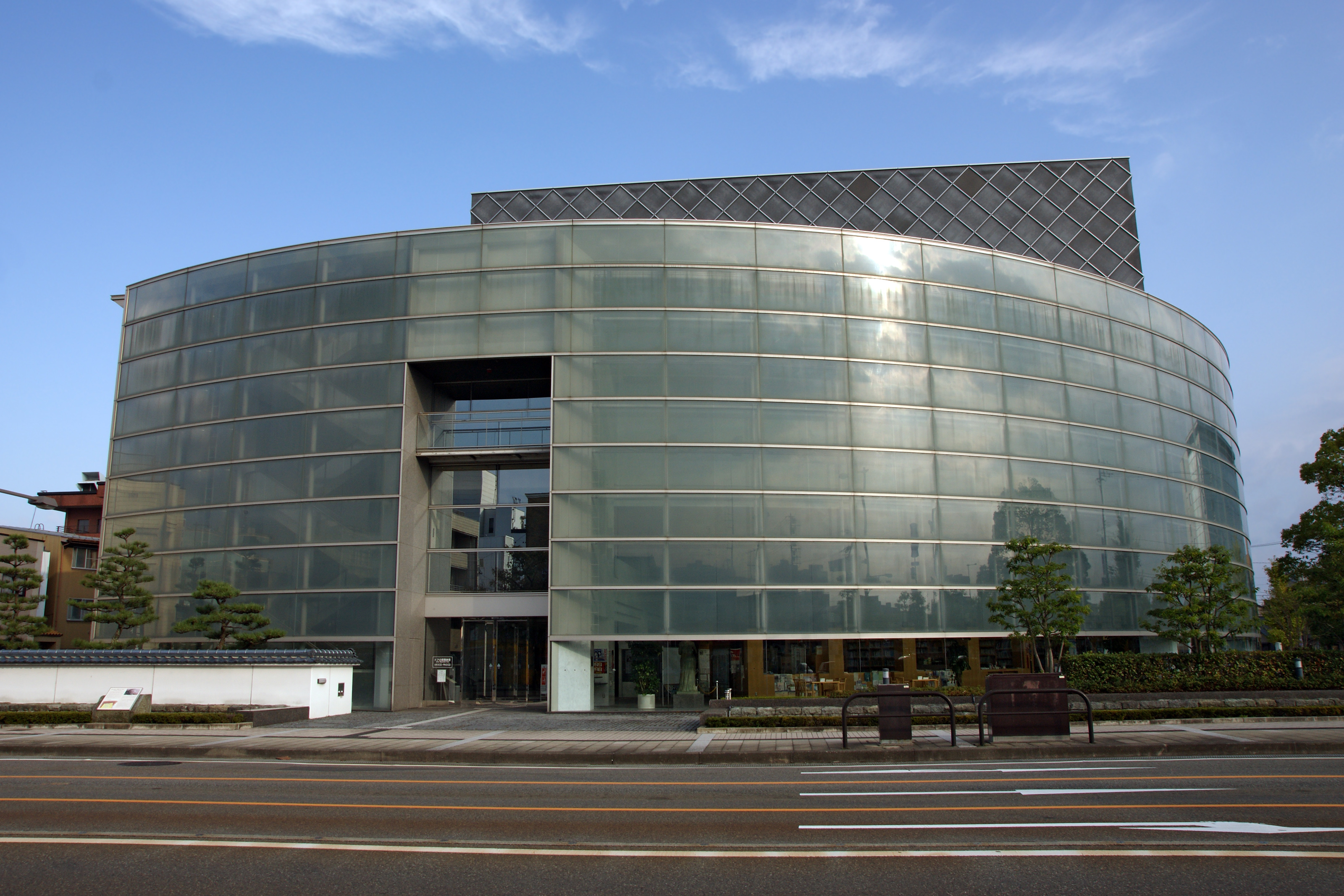
Fukui International Activities Plaza

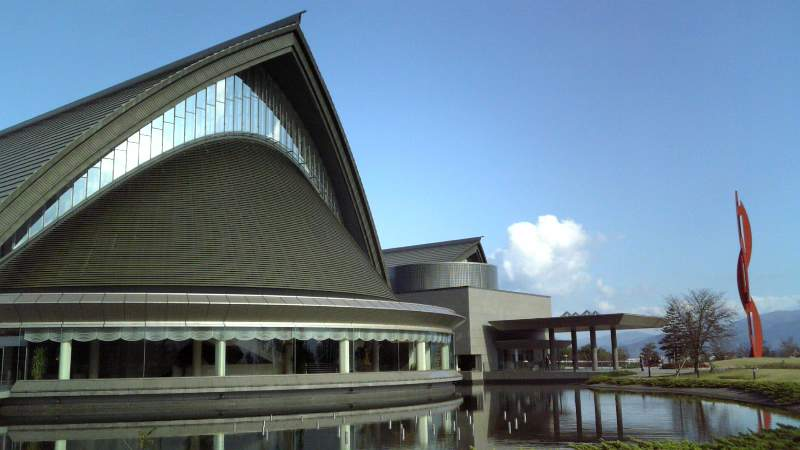
Harmony Hall Fukui

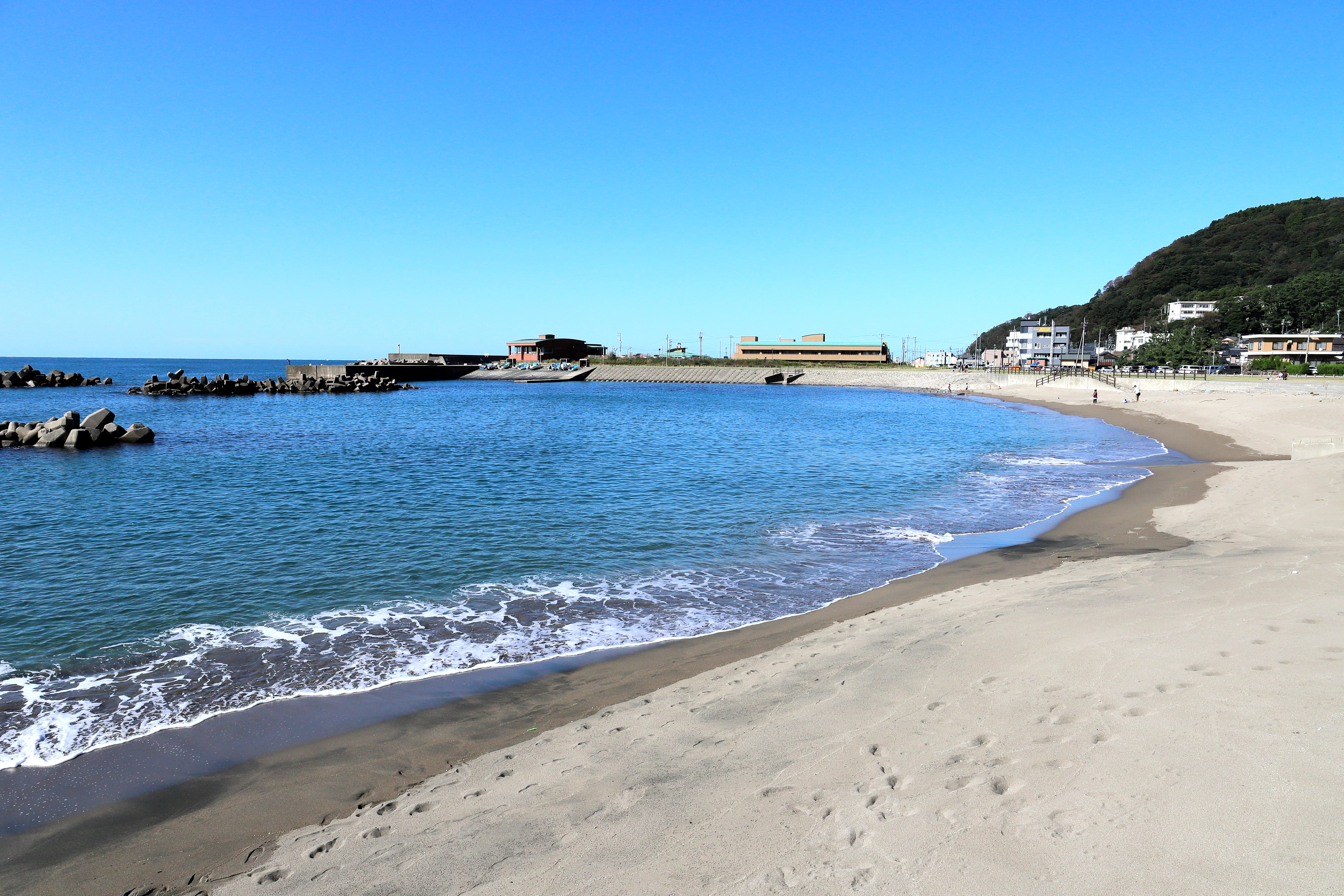
Koshino beach

== Culture ==
=== Sports ===
==== Baseball ====
- Fukui Wild Raptors (BC.League)

==== Handball ====
- Hokuriku Electric Power Company Blue Thunder (JHL)

==== Soccer ====
- Fukui United FC (Hokushinetsu Football League)
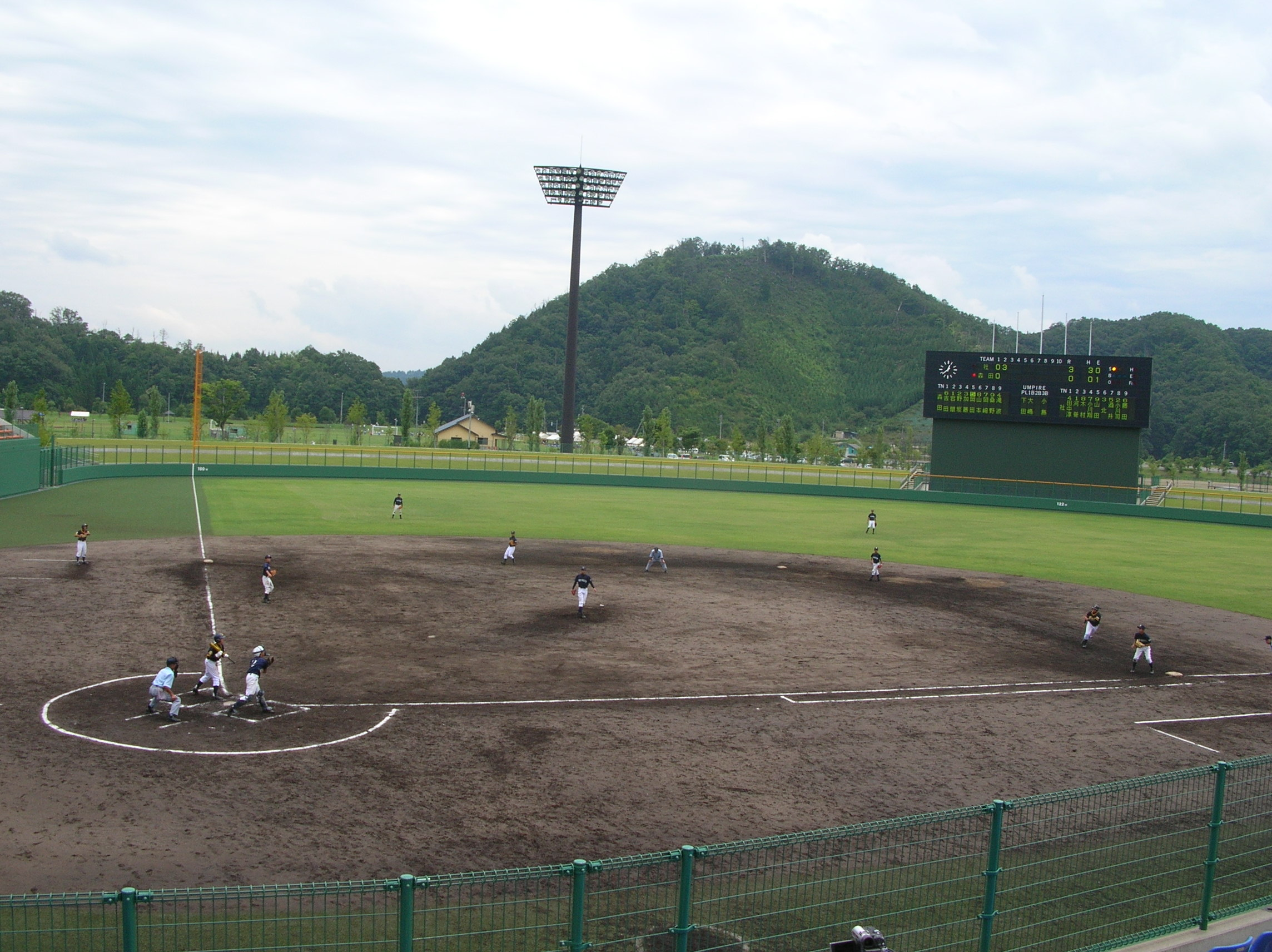
Fukui Phoenix Stadium

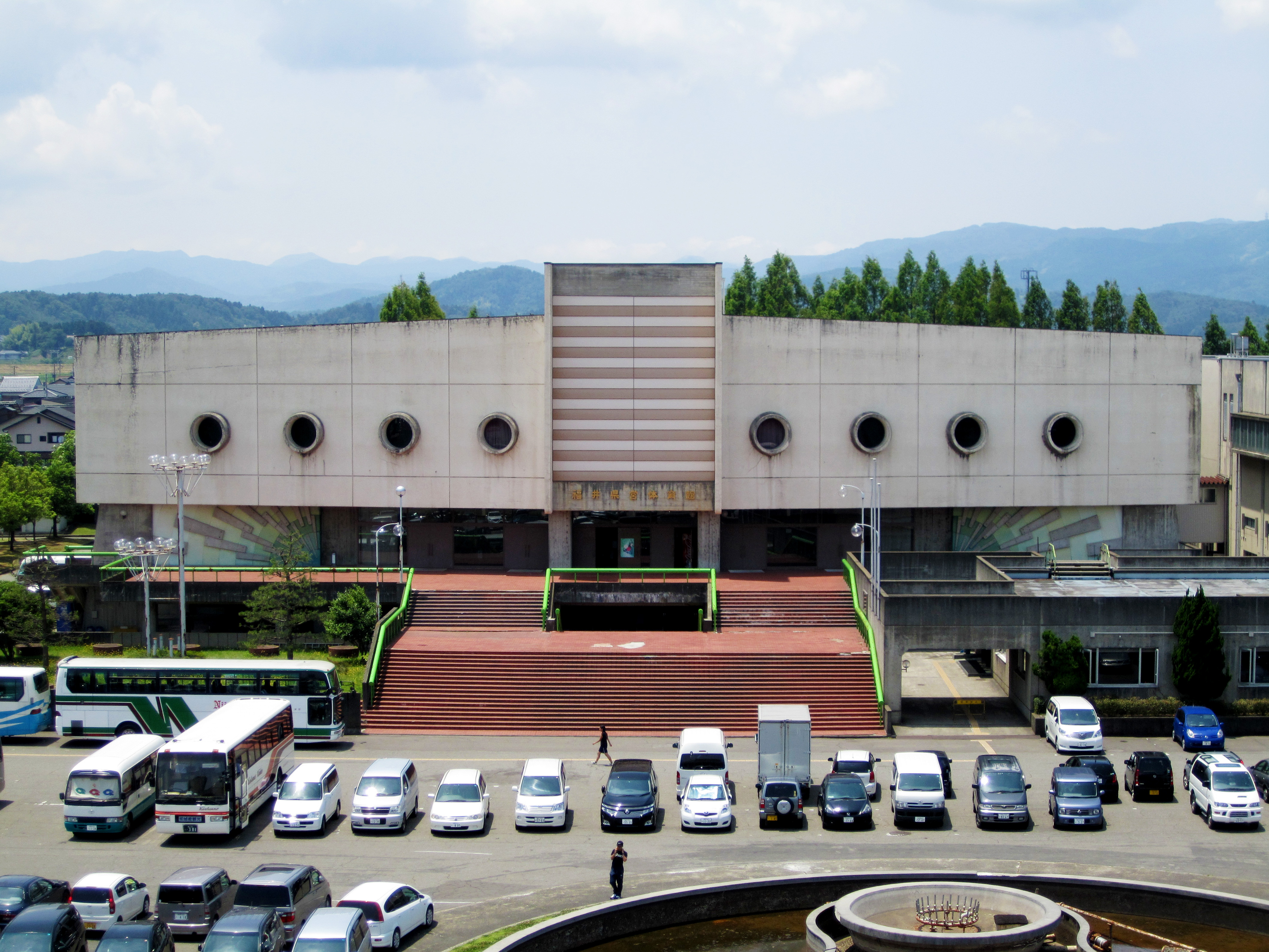
Fukui Prefectural Gymnasium

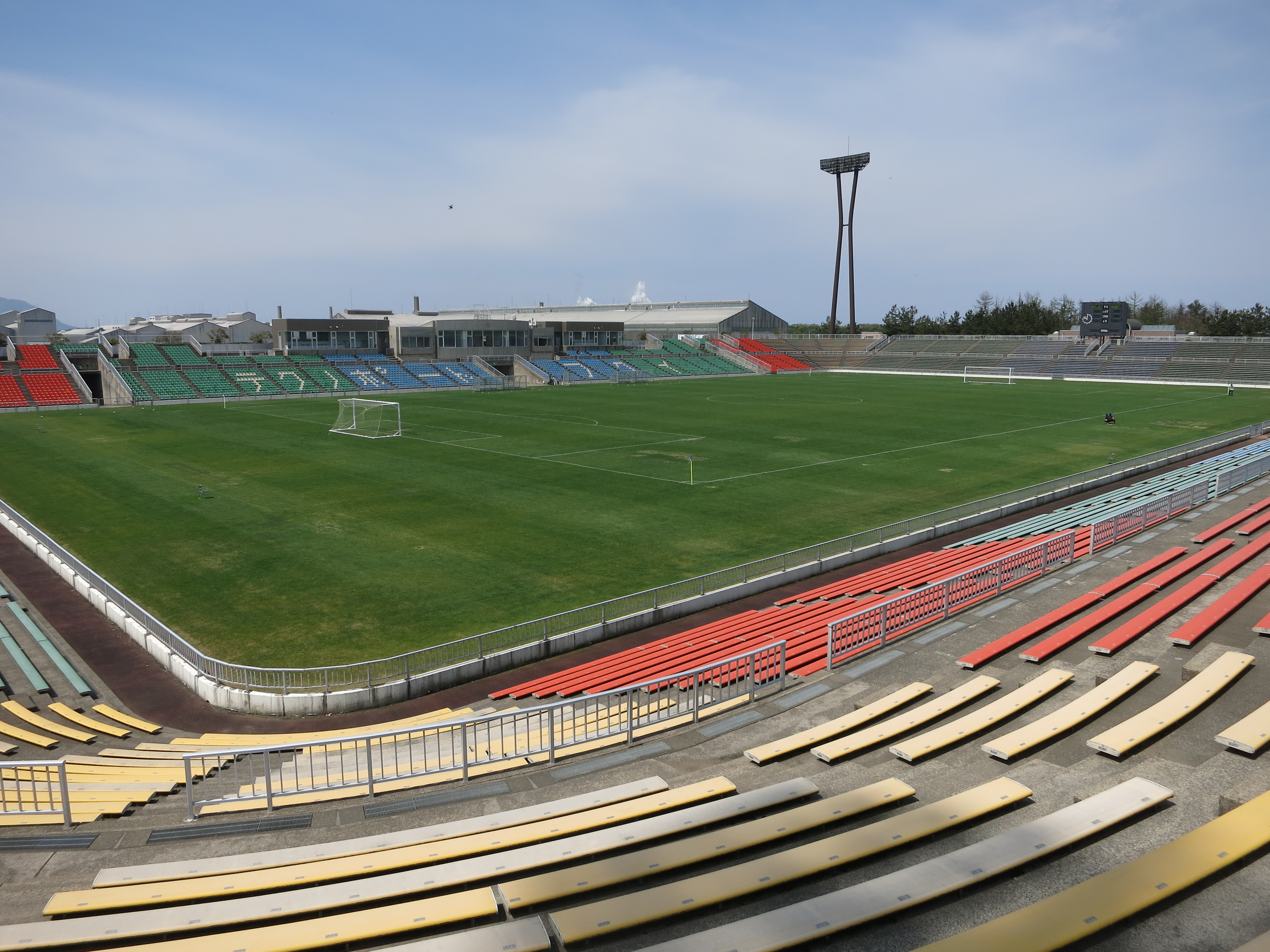
Technoport Fukui Stadium

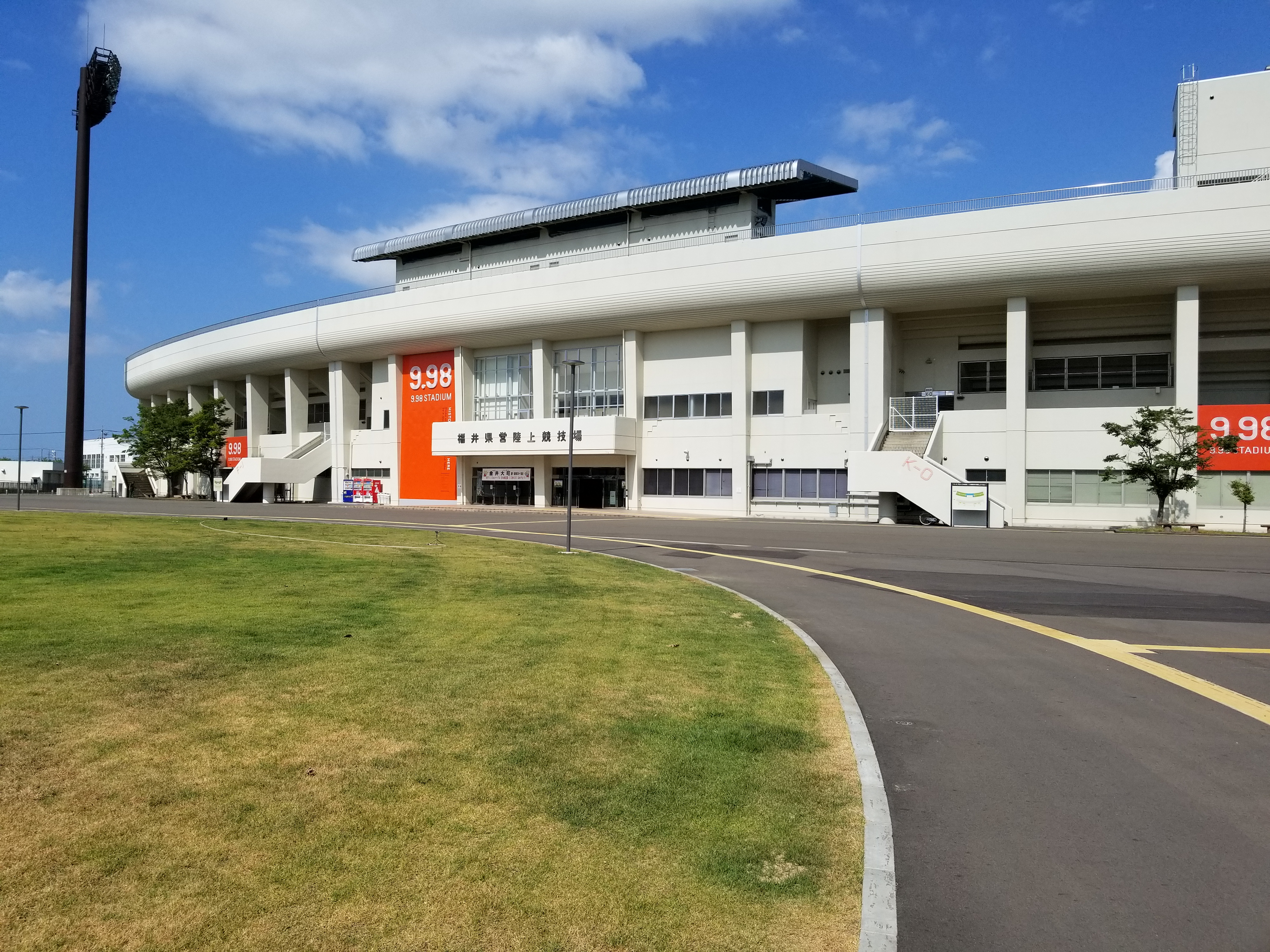
Fukui Prefectural sports Park (9.98 Stadium)

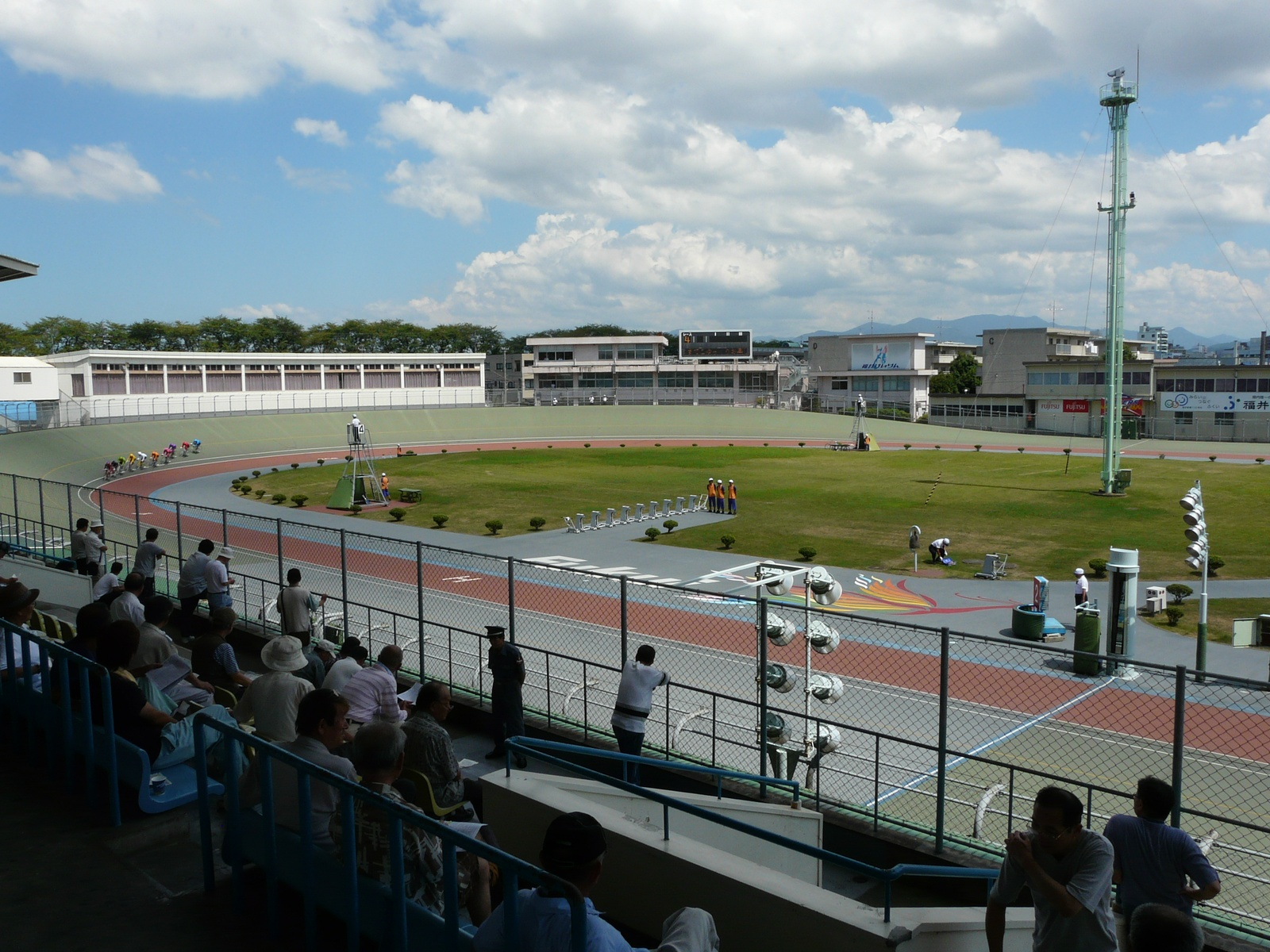
Fukui Velodrome
