= Echizen-Nonaka Station =

Railway station in Eiheiji, Fukui Prefecture, Japan

Echizen-Nonaka Station 越前野中駅
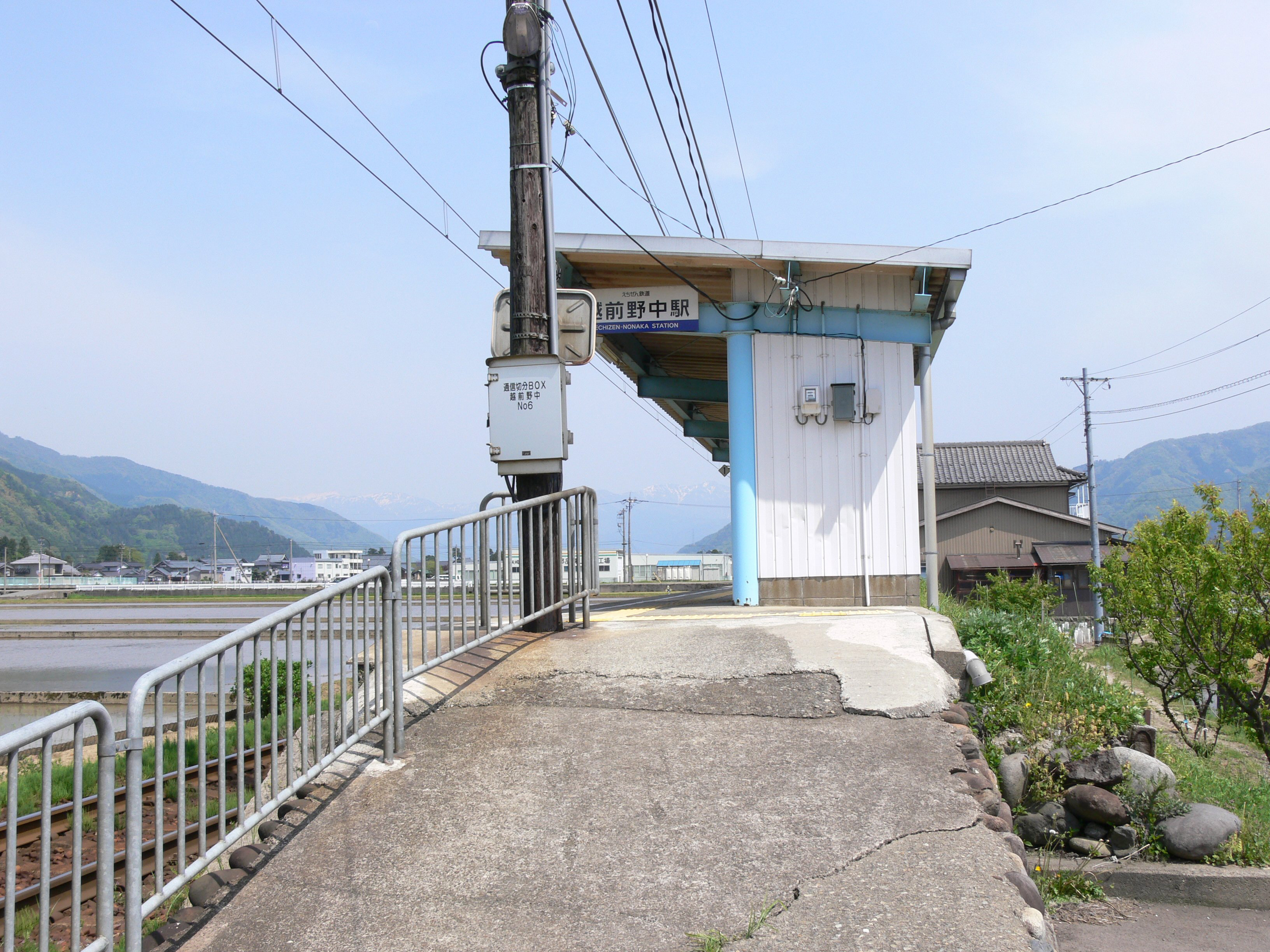
- Echizen-Nonaka Station

General information
- Location: 1 Nonaka, Eiheiji-machi, Yoshida-gun, Fukui-ken 910-1324; Japan
- Coordinates: 36°04′58″N 136°22′37″E
- Operator: Echizen Railway
- Line: ■ Katsuyama Eiheiji Line
- Distance: 15.7 km from Fukui
- Platforms: 1 side platform
- Tracks: 1

Other information
- Status: Unstaffed
- Station code: E16
- Website: Official website

History
- Opened: September 10, 1950
Location
- Location within Japan

Echizen-Nonaka Station (越前野中駅, Echizen-Nonaka-eki) is an Echizen Railway Katsuyama Eiheiji Line train station located in the town of Eiheiji, Yoshida District, Fukui Prefecture, Japan.

== Lines ==
Echizen-Nonaka Station is served by the Katsuyama Eiheiji Line, and is located 15.7 kilometers from the terminus of the line at Fukui.

== Station layout ==
The station consists of one side platform serving a single bi-directional track. The station is unattended. There is no station building, but only a shelter on the platform.

== Adjacent stations ==
«	Service	»
Katsuyama Eiheiji Line
Express: Does not stop at this station
Domeki	Local	Sannō

== History ==
Echizen-Nonaka Station was opened on September 10, 1950. Operations were halted from June 25, 2001. The station reopened on July 20, 2003 as an Echizen Railway station.

== Surrounding area ==
- Aside from a few homes nearby the station is surrounded by rice fields.
- Fisherman often use this station as an access point to the nearby Kuzuryū River.
- National Route 416 lies to the north.

== See also ==
- List of railway stations in Japan
