= Domeki Station =

Railway station in Eiheiji, Fukui Prefecture, Japan

Domeki Station 轟駅
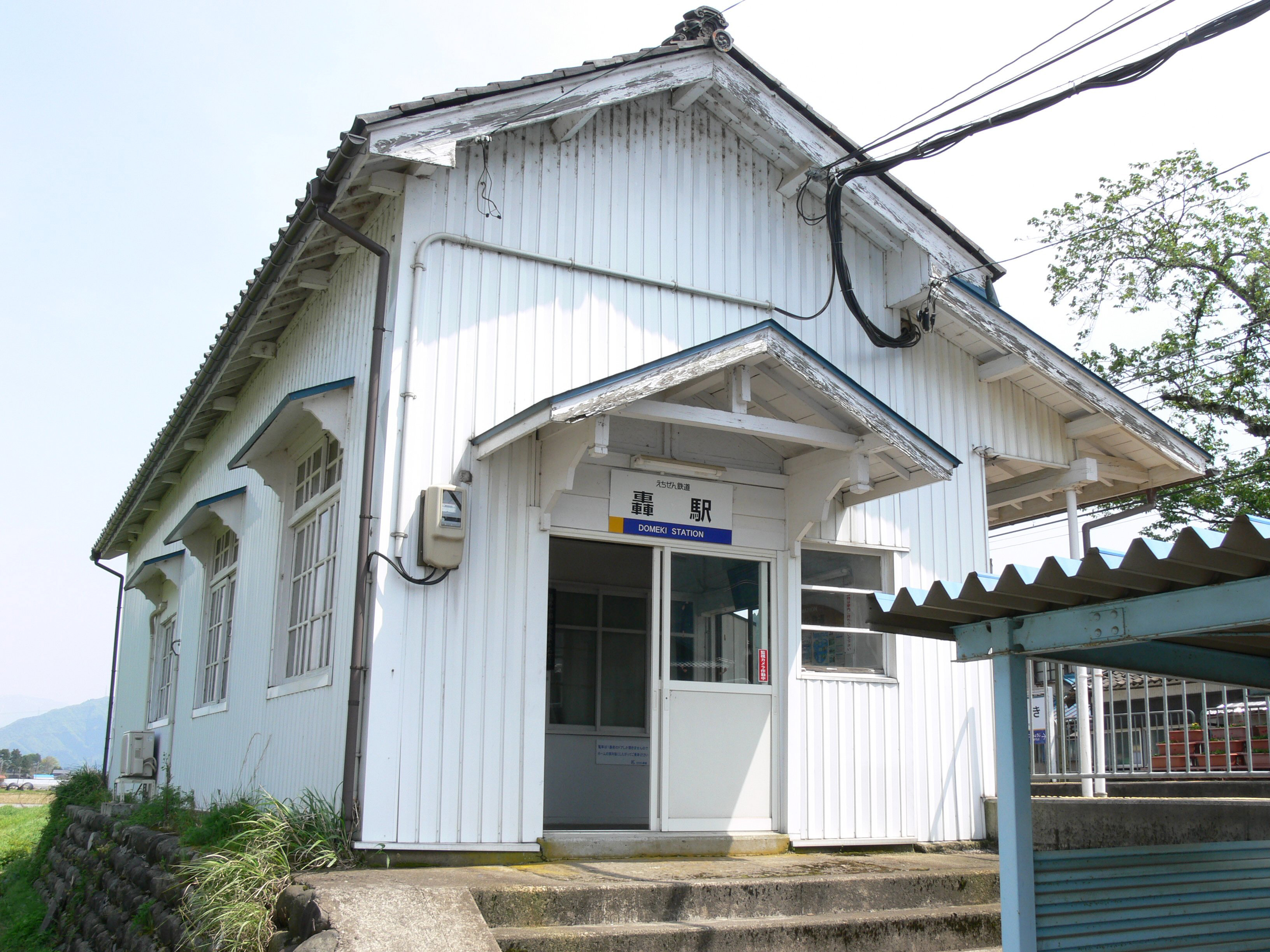
- Domeki Station in May 2009

General information
- Location: 19 Domeki, Eiheiji-machi, Yoshida-gun, Fukui-ken 910-1218; Japan
- Coordinates: 36°05′13″N 136°21′40″E
- Operator: Echizen Railway
- Line: ■ Katsuyama Eiheiji Line
- Distance: 14.2 km from Fukui
- Platforms: 2 side platforms
- Tracks: 2

Other information
- Status: Unstaffed
- Station code: E15
- Website: Official website

History
- Opened: February 11, 1914
Location
- Location within Japan

Domeki Station (轟駅, Domeki-eki) is an Echizen Railway Katsuyama Eiheiji Line train station located in the town of Eiheiji, Yoshida District, Fukui Prefecture, Japan.

== Lines ==
Domeki Station is served by the Katsuyama Eiheiji Line, and is located 14.2 kilometers from the terminus of the line at Fukui.

== Station layout ==
The station consists of two opposed side platforms connected by a level crossing. The station is unattended.

== Adjacent stations ==
«	Service	»
Katsuyama Eiheiji Line
Express: Does not stop at this station
Kōmyōji	Local	Echizen-Nonaka

== History ==
Domeki Station was opened on February 11, 1914. Operations were halted from June 25, 2001. The station reopened on July 20, 2003 as an Echizen Railway station.

== Surrounding area ==
- The station is near a small cluster of homes.
- Other points of interest to the north include:
  - Kuzuryū River
  - National Route 416

== See also ==
- List of railway stations in Japan
