= Shiizakai Station =

Railway station in Eiheiji, Fukui Prefecture, Japan

Shiizakai Station 志比堺駅
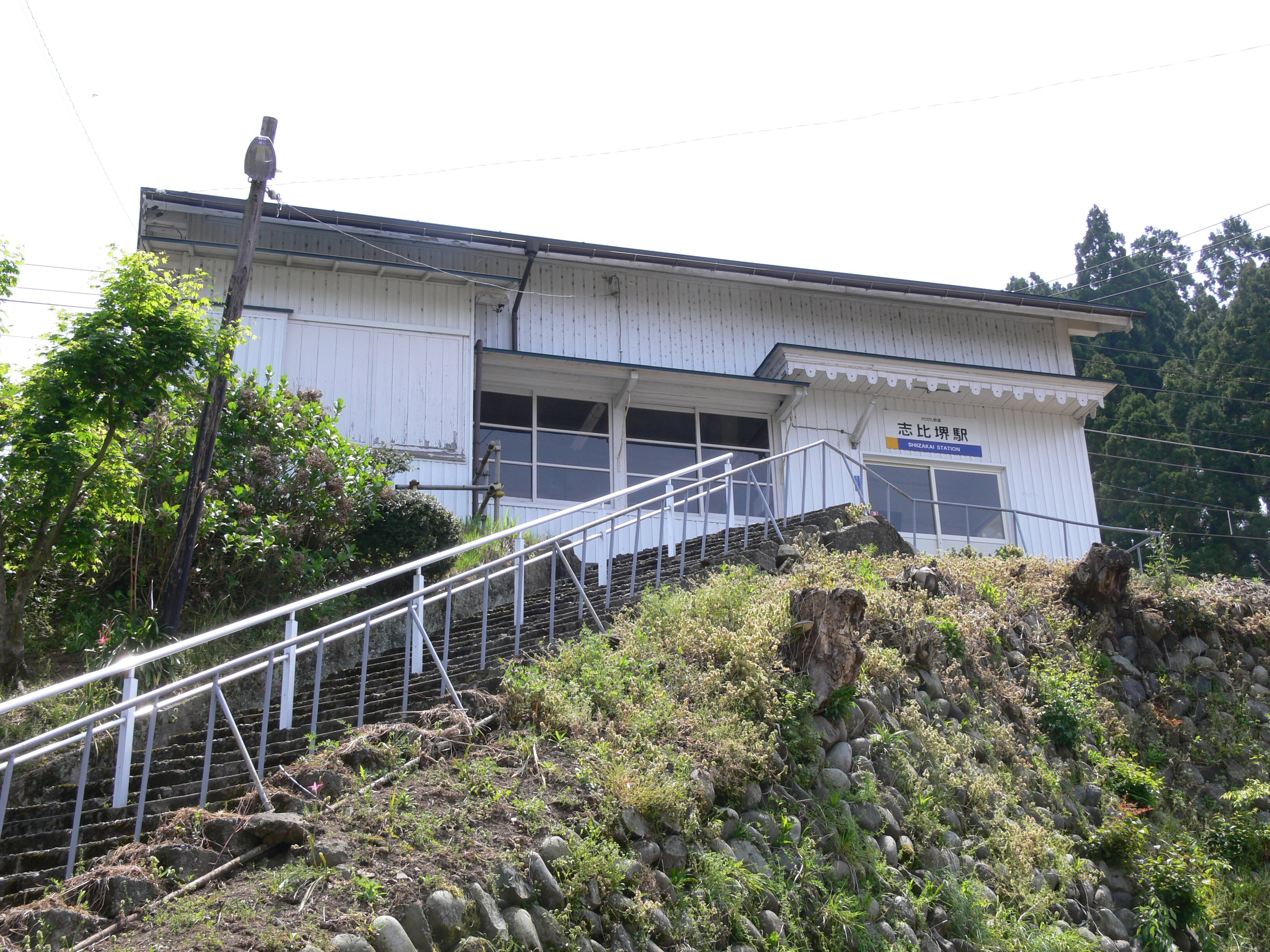
- Shiizakai Station in May 2009

General information
- Location: 3 Matsuoka-Shihizakai, Eiheiji-machi, Yoshida-gun, Fukui-ken 910-1111; Japan
- Coordinates: 36°05′53″N 136°18′40″E
- Operator: Echizen Railway
- Line: ■ Katsuyama Eiheiji Line
- Distance: 9.3 km from Fukui
- Platforms: 2 side platform
- Tracks: 1

Other information
- Status: Unstaffed
- Station code: E11
- Website: Official website

History
- Opened: February 11, 1914
Location
- Location within Japan

Shiizakai Station (志比堺駅, , Shiizakai-eki) is an Echizen Railway Katsuyama Eiheiji Line railway station located in Eiheiji, Yoshida District, Fukui Prefecture, Japan.

== Lines ==
Shiizakai Station is served by the Katsuyama Eiheiji Line, and is located 9.3 kilometers from the terminus of the line at Fukui.

== Station layout ==
The station consists of one side platform serving single bi-directional line. The station is unattended.

== Adjacent stations ==
| « | Service | » |
Katsuyama Eiheiji Line
Express: Does not stop at this station
| Matsuoka | Local | Eiheijiguchi |

== History ==
Shiizakai Station was opened on February 11, 1914. Operations were halted from June 25, 2001. The station reopened on July 20, 2003 as an Echizen Railway station.

== Surrounding area ==
- The station sits atop a hill near a residential area.
- The Kuzuryū River and National Route 416 lie to the north.

== See also ==
- List of railway stations in Japan
