= Oiwakeguchi Station =

Railway station in Fukui, Fukui Prefecture, Japan

Oiwakeguchi Station 追分口駅
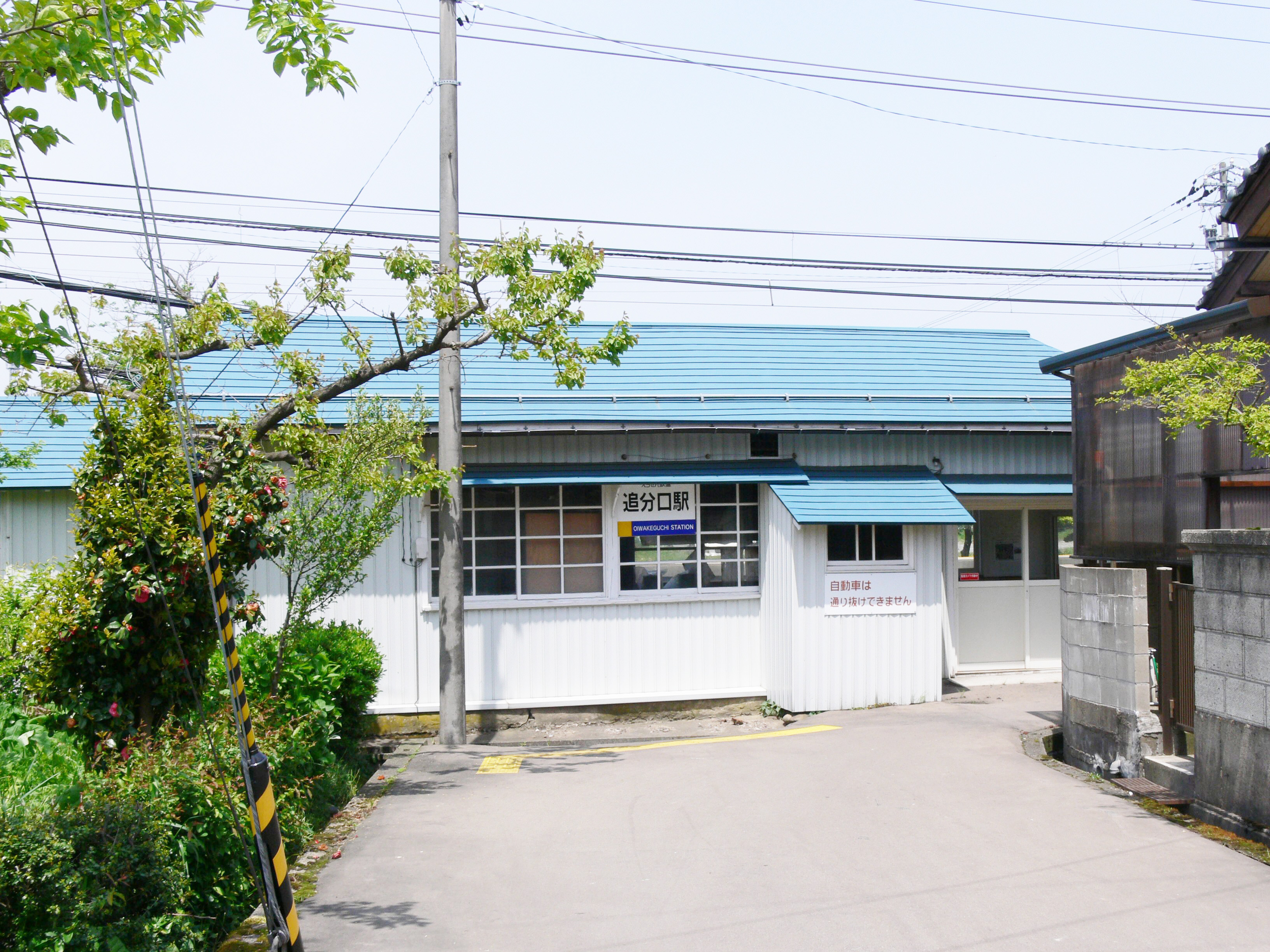
- Oiwakeguchi Station in May 2009

General information
- Location: 13 Kami-Nakamachi, Fukui-shi, Fukui-ken 910-0826; Japan
- Coordinates: 36°04′57″N 136°15′41″E
- Operator: Echizen Railway
- Line: ■ Katsuyama Eiheiji Line
- Distance: 4.4 km from Fukui
- Platforms: 1 island platform
- Tracks: 2

Other information
- Status: Unstaffed
- Station code: E6
- Website: Official website

History
- Opened: May 13, 1915
Location
- Location within Japan

Oiwakeguchi Station (追分口駅, Oiwakeguchi-eki) is an Echizen Railway Katsuyama Eiheiji Line railway station located in the city of Fukui, Fukui Prefecture, Japan.

== Lines ==
Oiwakeguchi Station is served by the Katsuyama Eiheiji Line, and is located 4.4 kilometers from the terminus of the line at Fukui.

== Station layout ==
The station consists of one island platform connected to the station building by a level crossing. The station is unattended.

== Adjacent stations ==
«	Service	»
Katsuyama Eiheiji Line
Express: Does not stop at this station
Echizen-Shinbo	Local	Higashi-Fujishima

== History ==
The station was opened on May 13, 1915. Operations were halted from June 25, 2001. The station reopened on July 20, 2003 as an Echizen Railway station.

== Surrounding area ==
- To the north of the station is an industrial park; to the south, homes and rice fields.
- National Route 416 passes to the south.

== See also ==
- List of railway stations in Japan
