= Higashi-Fujishima Station =

Railway station in Fukui, Fukui Prefecture, Japan

Higashi-Fujishima Station 東藤島駅
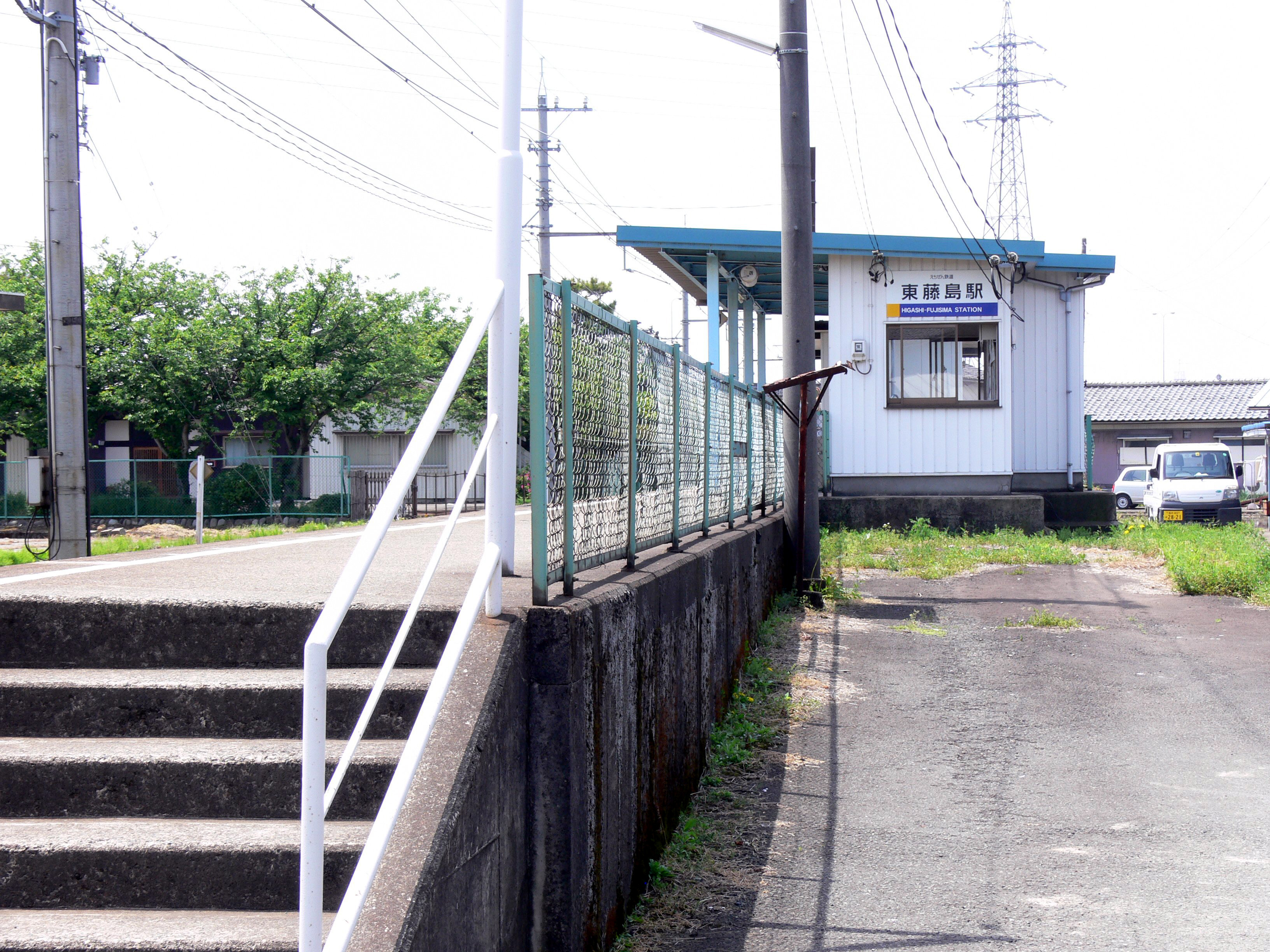
- Higashi-Fujishima Station in May 2009

General information
- Location: 48 Fujishima-chō, Fukui-shi, Fukui-ken 910-0827; Japan
- Coordinates: 36°05′12″N 136°16′11″E
- Operator: Echizen Railway
- Line: ■ Katsuyama Eiheiji Line
- Distance: 5.3 km from Fukui
- Platforms: 1 side platform
- Tracks: 1

Other information
- Status: Unstaffed
- Station code: E7
- Website: Official website

History
- Opened: February 11, 1914
- Former names: Fujishima (to 1929)
Location
- Location within Japan

Higashi-Fujishima Station (東藤島駅, Higashi-Fujishima-eki) is an Echizen Railway Katsuyama Eiheiji Line railway station located in the city of Fukui, Fukui Prefecture, Japan.

== Lines ==
Kannonmachi Station is served by the Katsuyama Eiheiji Line, and is located 5.3 kilometers from the terminus of the line at Fukui.

== Station layout ==
The station consists of one side platform serving a single bi-directional track. The station is unattended.

== Adjacent stations ==
«	Service	»
Katsuyama Eiheiji Line
Express: Does not stop at this station
Oiwakeguchi	Local	Echizen-Shimabashi

== History ==
The station opened on February 11, 1914, as Fujishima Station (藤島駅). It was renamed to its present name in 1929. Operations were halted from June 25, 2001. The station reopened on July 20, 2003, as an Echizen Railway station.

== Surrounding area ==
- There is a cluster of homes and businesses around the station, with rice fields further away. Fukui City Higashi-Fujishima Elementary School is across the street.
- Fukui Prefectural Route 164 is outside the station's east exit; National Route 416 passes to the south.

== See also ==
- List of railway stations in Japan
