= Kōmyōji Station =

Railway station in Eiheiji, Fukui Prefecture, Japan

Kōmyōji Station 光明寺駅
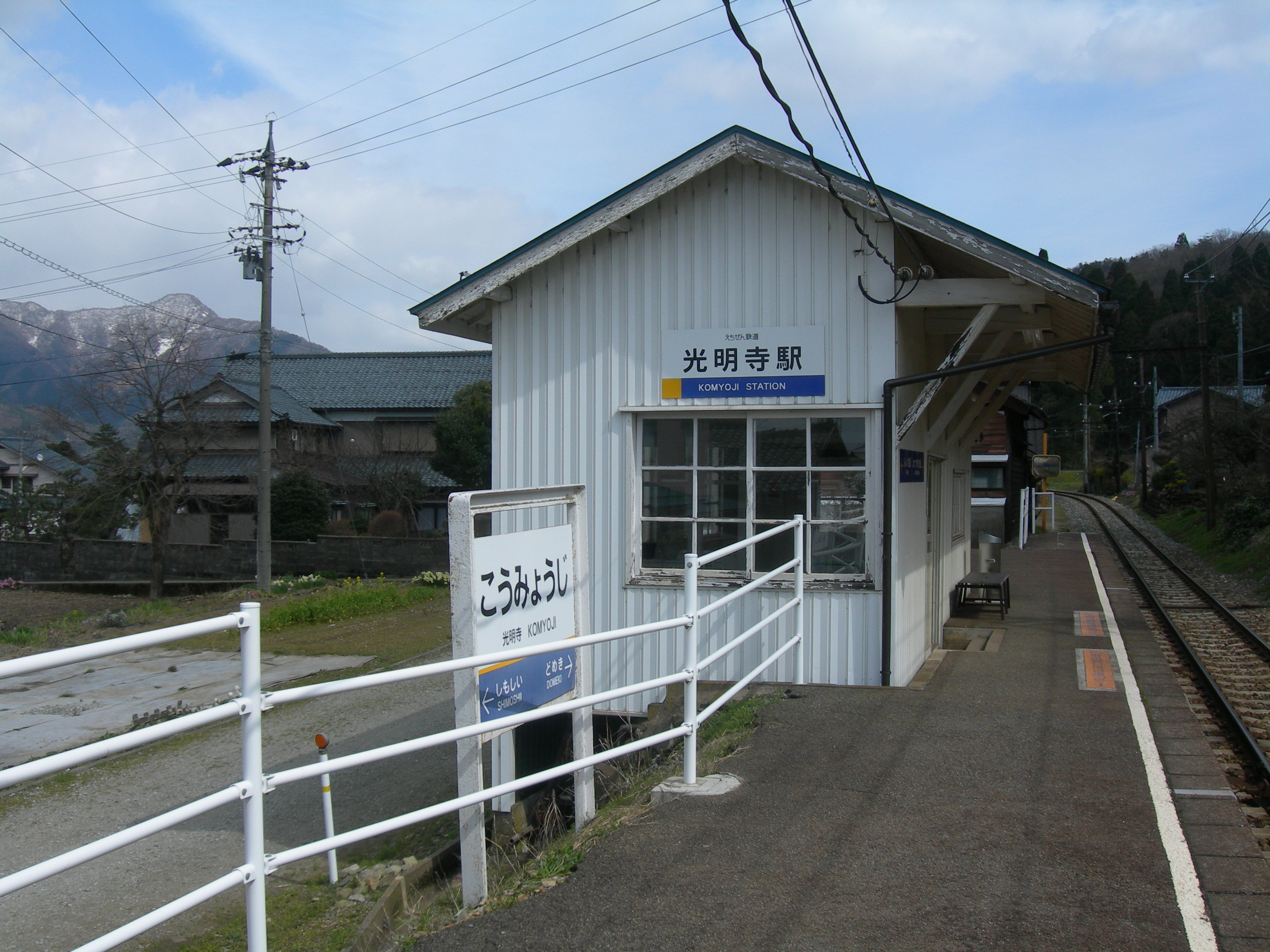
- Kōmyōji Station

General information
- Location: 10 Kōmyōji, Eiheiji-machi, Yoshida-gun, Fukui-ken 910-1216; Japan
- Coordinates: 36°05′18″N 136°20′41″E
- Operator: Echizen Railway
- Line: ■ Katsuyama Eiheiji Line
- Distance: 11.9 km from Fukui
- Platforms: 1 side platform
- Tracks: 1

Other information
- Status: Unstaffed
- Station code: E14
- Website: Official website

History
- Opened: February 11, 1914
Location
- Location within Japan

Kōmyōji Station (光明寺駅, Kōmyōji-eki) is an Echizen Railway Katsuyama Eiheiji Line train station located in the town of Eiheiji, Yoshida District, Fukui Prefecture, Japan.

== Lines ==
Kōmyōji Station is served by the Katsuyama Eiheiji Line, and is located 12.7 kilometers from the terminus of the line at Fukui.

== Station layout ==
The station consists of one side platform serving a single bi-directional track. The station is unattended.

== Adjacent stations ==
«	Service	»
Katsuyama Eiheiji Line
Express: Does not stop at this station
Shimoshii	Local	Domeki

== History ==
Kōmyōji Station was opened on February 11, 1914. Operations were halted from June 25, 2001. The station reopened on July 20, 2003 as an Echizen Railway station.

== Surrounding area ==
- This station is surrounded by scattered homes and rice fields.
- Other points of interest to the north:
  - Kuzuryū River
  - National Route 416

== See also ==
- List of railway stations in Japan
