= Echizen-Shinbo Station =

Railway station in Fukui, Fukui Prefecture, Japan

Echizen-Shinbo Station 越前新保駅
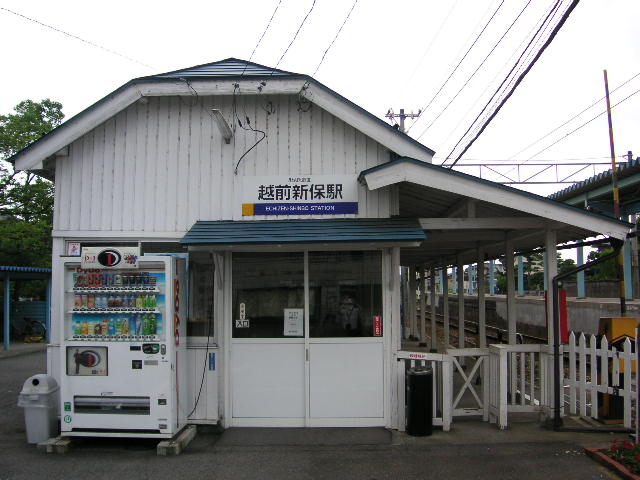
- Echizen-Shinbo Station in December 2006

General information
- Location: Shinbo 2-chome, Fukui-shi, Fukui-ken 910-0833; Japan
- Coordinates: 36°04′50″N 136°15′05″E
- Operator: Echizen Railway
- Line: ■ Katsuyama Eiheiji Line
- Distance: 3.4 km from Fukui
- Platforms: 1 island platform
- Tracks: 2

Other information
- Status: Staffed
- Station code: E5
- Website: Official website

History
- Opened: April 17, 1916
Location
- Location within Japan

Echizen-Shinbo Station (越前新保駅, Echizen-shinbo-eki) is an Echizen Railway Katsuyama Eiheiji Line railway station located in the city of Fukui, Fukui Prefecture, Japan.

== Lines ==
Echizen-Shinbo Station is served by the Katsuyama Eiheiji Line, and is located 3.4 kilometers from the terminus of the line at Fukui.

== Station layout ==
The station consists of one island platform connected to the station building by a level crossing. The station is staffed.

== Adjacent stations ==
«	Service	»
Katsuyama Eiheiji Line
Express: Does not stop at this station
Echizen-Kaihotsu	Local	Oiwakeguchi

== History ==
The station was opened on April 17, 1916. Operations were halted from June 25, 2001. The station reopened on July 20, 2003 as an Echizen Railway station.

== Surrounding area ==
- The station is surrounded by apartment buildings, houses, and shops.
- Other points of interest include:
  - National Route 8 - Fukui Bypass
  - National Route 416
  - Fukui Prefectural Fukui Nōrin Senior High School
  - Fukui Circulatory Hospital
  - Fukui Aiiku Hospital

== See also ==
- List of railway stations in Japan
