= Echizen-Takehara Station =

Railway station in Eiheiji, Fukui Prefecture, Japan

Echizen-Takehara Station 越前竹原駅
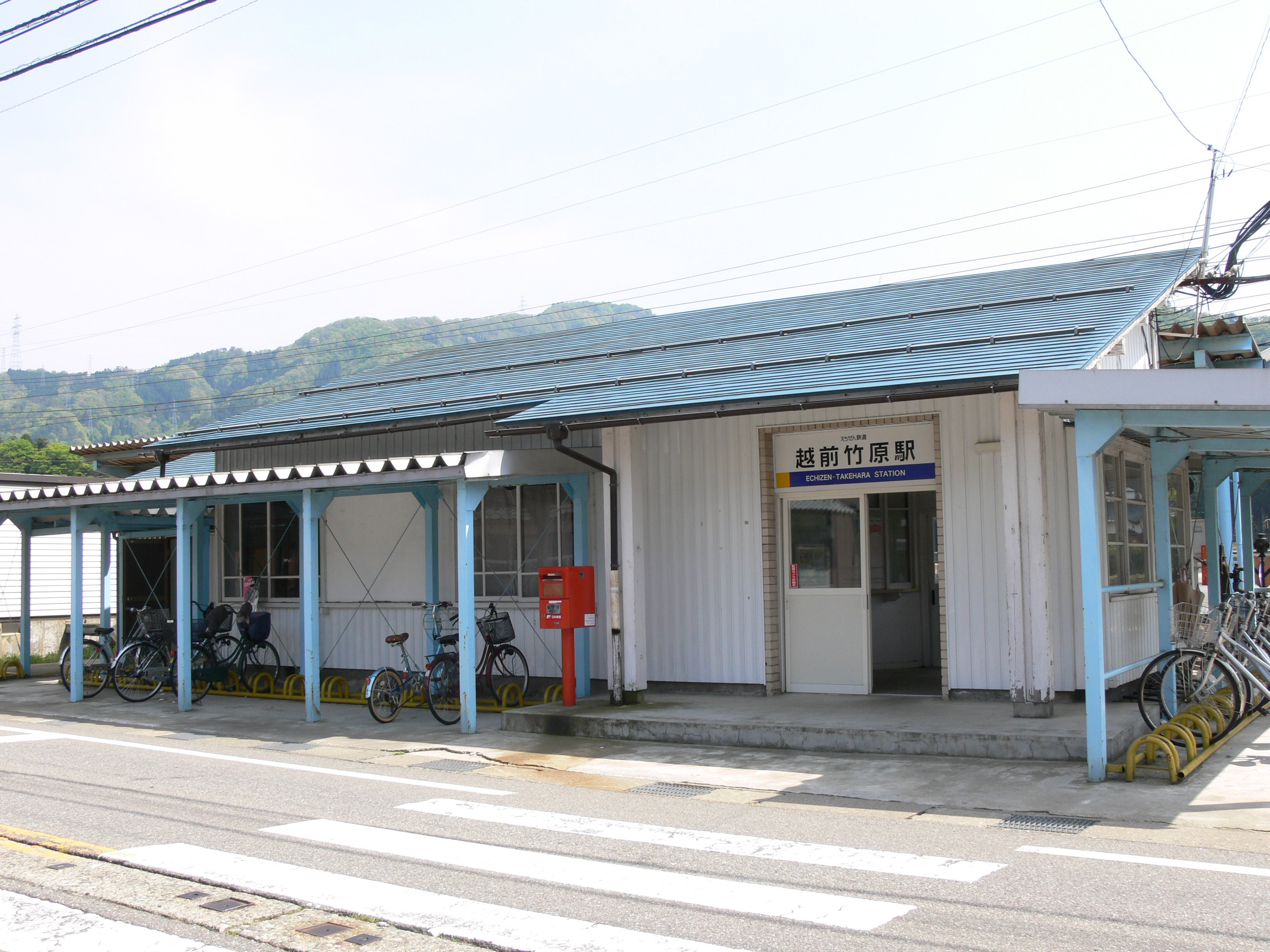
- Echizen-Takehara Station in May 2009

General information
- Location: 2 Takehara, Eiheiji-machi, Yoshida-gun, Fukui-ken 910-1305; Japan
- Coordinates: 36°04′26″N 136°24′47″E
- Operator: Echizen Railway
- Line: ■ Katsuyama Eiheiji Line
- Distance: 19.3 km from Fukui
- Platforms: 1 island platform
- Tracks: 2

Other information
- Status: Unstaffed
- Station code: E18
- Website: Official website

History
- Opened: February 11, 1914
- Former names: Ichiarakawa (until 1955)
Location
- Location within Japan

Echizen-Takehara Station (越前竹原駅, Echizen-takehara-eki) is an Echizen Railway Katsuyama Eiheiji Line train station located in the town of Eiheiji, Yoshida District, Fukui Prefecture, Japan.

== Lines ==
Echizen-Takehara Station is served by the Katsuyama Eiheiji Line, and is located 19.3 kilometers from the terminus of the line at Fukui. Between Echizenguchi and Katsuyama, trains generally pass one another at this station.

== Station layout ==
The station consists of one island platform connected to the station building by a level crossing. The station is unattended.

== Adjacent stations ==
«	Service	»
Katsuyama Eiheiji Line
Express: Does not stop at this station
Sannō	Local	Kobunato

== History ==
Echizen-Takehara Station was opened on February 11, 1914 as Ichiarakawa Station (市荒川駅, Ichiarakawa-eki). The station was relocated approximately 300 meters west on September 1, 1955 and renamed Echizen-Takehara Station. Operations were halted from June 25, 2001. The station reopened on July 20, 2003 as an Echizen Railway station.

== Surrounding area ==
- The station faces Fukui Prefectural Route 255 and a small group of houses on the other side of the road. Behind the station are rice fields.
- Other points of interest include:
  - Ninki-no-Sato
  - Kamishii Bunka Kaikan Sun-Sun Hall
  - Eiheiji Municipal Library, Kamishii Branch

== See also ==
- List of railway stations in Japan
