= Sannō Station (Fukui) =

Railway station in Eiheiji, Fukui Prefecture, Japan

Sannō Station 山王駅
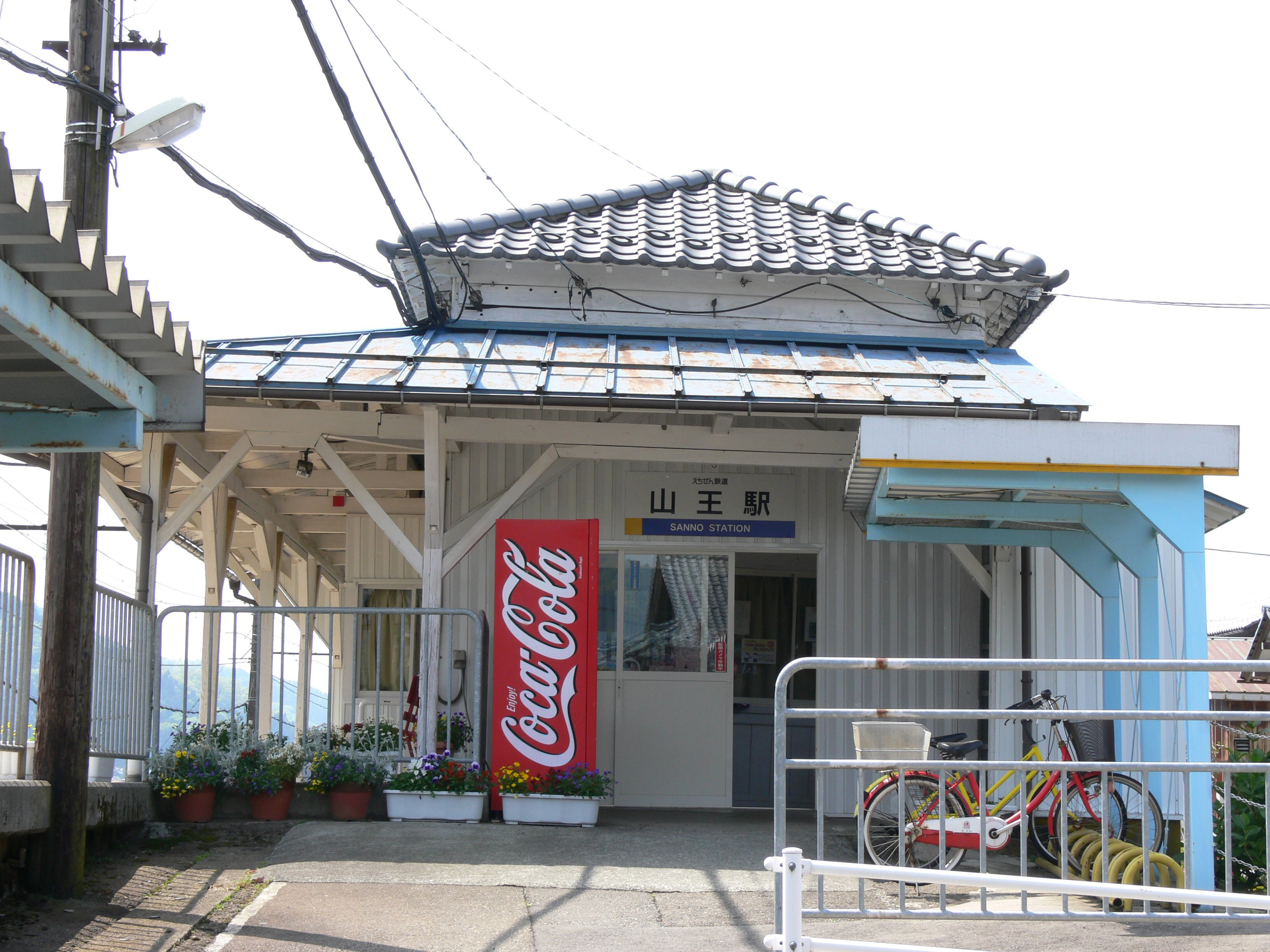
- Sannō Station in May 2009

General information
- Location: 21 Sannō, Eiheiji-machi, Yoshida-gun, Fukui-ken 910-1321; Japan
- Coordinates: 36°04′45″N 136°23′33″E
- Operator: Echizen Railway
- Line: ■ Katsuyama Eiheiji Line
- Distance: 17.2 km from Fukui
- Platforms: 2 side platforms
- Tracks: 2

Other information
- Status: Staffed
- Station code: E17
- Website: Official website

History
- Opened: February 11, 1914
Location
- Location within Japan

Sannō Station (山王駅, Sannō-eki) is an Echizen Railway Katsuyama Eiheiji Line train station located in the town of Eiheiji, Yoshida District, Fukui Prefecture, Japan.

== Lines ==
Sannō Station is served by the Katsuyama Eiheiji Line, and is located 17.2 kilometers from the terminus of the line at Fukui.

== Station layout ==
The station consists of two opposed side platform connected by a level crossing. The station is staffed.

== Adjacent stations ==
«	Service	»
Katsuyama Eiheiji Line
Express: Does not stop at this station
Echizen-Nonaka	Local	Echizen-Takehara

== History ==
Sannō Station was opened on February 11, 1914. Operations were halted from June 25, 2001. The station reopened on July 20, 2003 as an Echizen Railway station.

== Surrounding area ==
- Eiheiji Town Hall Kamishii Branch Office
- Fukui Prefectural Route 255
  - National Route 416

== See also ==
- List of railway stations in Japan
