= Echizen-Shimabashi Station =

Railway station in Fukui, Fukui Prefecture, Japan

Echizen-Shimabashi Station 越前島橋駅
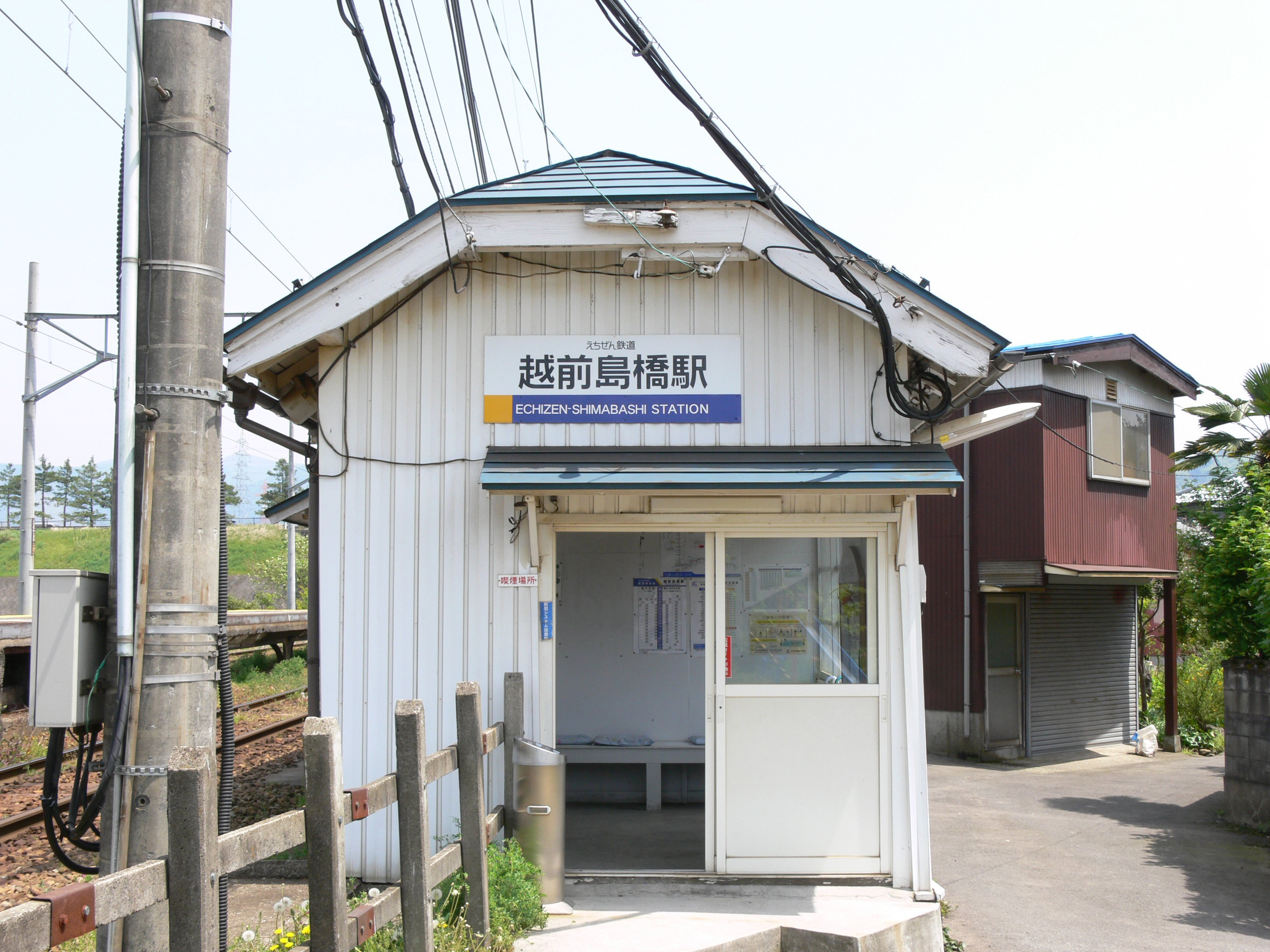
- Station building (May 2009)

General information
- Location: Nakanogo-cho 9-23-4, Fukui, Fukui Prefecture, Japan; Japan
- Coordinates: 36°5′24″N 136°16′37.5″E
- System: Railway station
- Operator: Echizen Railway
- Line: Katsuyama Eiheiji Line
- Distance: 6.0 km from Fukui Station
- Platforms: 1 island platform
- Tracks: 2

Construction
- Structure type: At-grade

Other information
- Station code: E8

History
- Opened: June 1, 1919

Passengers
- 80 daily (2018)
Location

Echizen-Shimabashi Station (越前島橋駅, Echizen-Shimabashi-eki) is a railway station on the Katsuyama Eiheiji Line operated by Echizen Railway in Fukui, Fukui Prefecture, Japan. The station is numbered E8.

== History ==
- June 1, 1919: Opened as Shimabashi Station (島橋駅) on the Kyoto Electric Railway's Echizen Electric Railway line between Higashi-Fujishima Station and Kannonmachi Station. The name was later changed to Echizen-Shimabashi Station, though the exact date is unknown.
- March 2, 1942: Became part of Keifuku Electric Railway following the company's establishment.
- June 1, 1975: The station became unstaffed.
- June 24, 2001: A head-on collision occurred on the Keifuku Railway's Echizen Main Line, resulting in the suspension of operations.
- February 1, 2003: Echizen Railway acquired the station facilities from Keifuku Railway.
- July 20, 2003: Operations resumed as part of the Echizen Railway's Katsuyama Eiheiji Line.

== Station layout ==
The station consists of a single island platform serving two tracks. Access between the platform and the station building is provided via a level crossing. Trains operate on a right-hand running system, allowing for passing at this station.

Platform	Line	Direction	Destination
Island platform	Katsuyama Eiheiji Line	Down	Katsuyama
	Katsuyama Eiheiji Line	Up	Fukui

== Passenger statistics ==
In fiscal year 2018, the station was used by an average of 80 passengers daily.

== Surrounding area ==
- A park-and-ride parking lot with 30 spaces was added in 2018.
- National Route 416
- Fukui Prefectural University (approximately 2.3 km from the station)

== Adjacent stations ==
Line	Preceding station	Distance	Following station
Katsuyama Eiheiji Line	Higashi-Fujishima Station (E7)	0.7 km	Kannonmachi Station (E9)
