= Echizen-Kaihotsu Station =

Railway station in Fukui, Fukui Prefecture, Japan

Echizen-Kaihotsu Station 越前開発駅
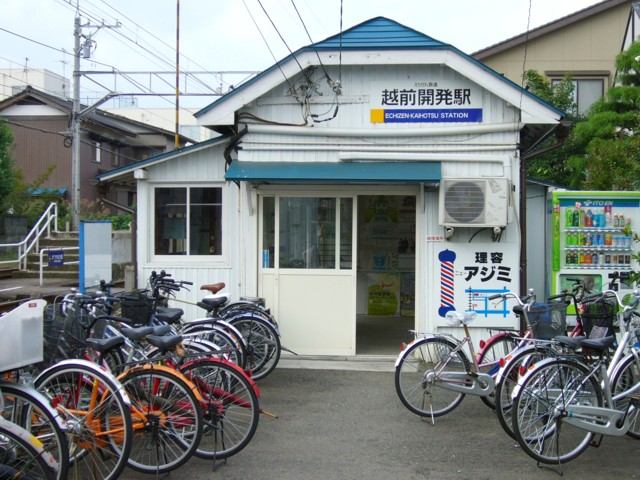
- Echizen-Kaihotsu Station in October 2005

General information
- Location: 1 Kaihotsu-chō, Fukui-shi, Fukui-ken 910-0842; Japan
- Coordinates: 36°04′32″N 136°14′30″E
- Operator: Echizen Railway
- Line: ■ Katsuyama Eiheiji Line
- Distance: 2.4 km from Fukui
- Platforms: 1 side platform
- Tracks: 1

Other information
- Status: Staffed
- Station code: E4
- Website: Official website

History
- Opened: August 20, 1932
Location
- Location within Japan

Echizen-Kaihotsu Station (越前開発駅, Echizen-kaihotsu-eki) is an Echizen Railway Katsuyama Eiheiji Line railway station located in the city of Fukui, Fukui Prefecture, Japan.

== Lines ==
Echizen-Kaihotsu Station is served by the Katsuyama Eiheiji Line, and is located 2.4 kilometers from the terminus of the line at Fukui.

== Station layout ==
The station consists of one side platform connected to the station building by a level crossing, serving a single bi-directional track. The station is staffed only during the peak period of 7:00-10:00 and 16:00-20:00.

== Adjacent stations ==
«	Service	»
Katsuyama Eiheiji Line
Express: Does not stop at this station
Fukuiguchi	Local	Echizen-Shinbo

== History ==
The station was opened on August 20, 1932. Operations were halted from June 25, 2001. The station reopened on July 20, 2003 as an Echizen Railway station. One of the tracks at the station was removed on September 27, 2015.

== Surrounding area ==
- The station is surrounded by apartment buildings, houses, and shops.
- Other points of interest include:
  - National Route 8 - Fukui Bypass
  - Fukui City Keimō Elementary School
  - Fukui Labor Standards Office
  - JOYFUL FUKUI Spa
  - Natural Hot Spring Gokurakuyū, Fukui Branch

== See also ==
- List of railway stations in Japan
