= Hota Station =

Hota Station is the name of two train stations in Japan:

- Hota Station (Chiba)
- Hota Station (Fukui)
