= Shin-Fukui Station =

Railway station in Fukui, Fukui Prefecture, Japan

Shin-Fukui Station 新福井駅
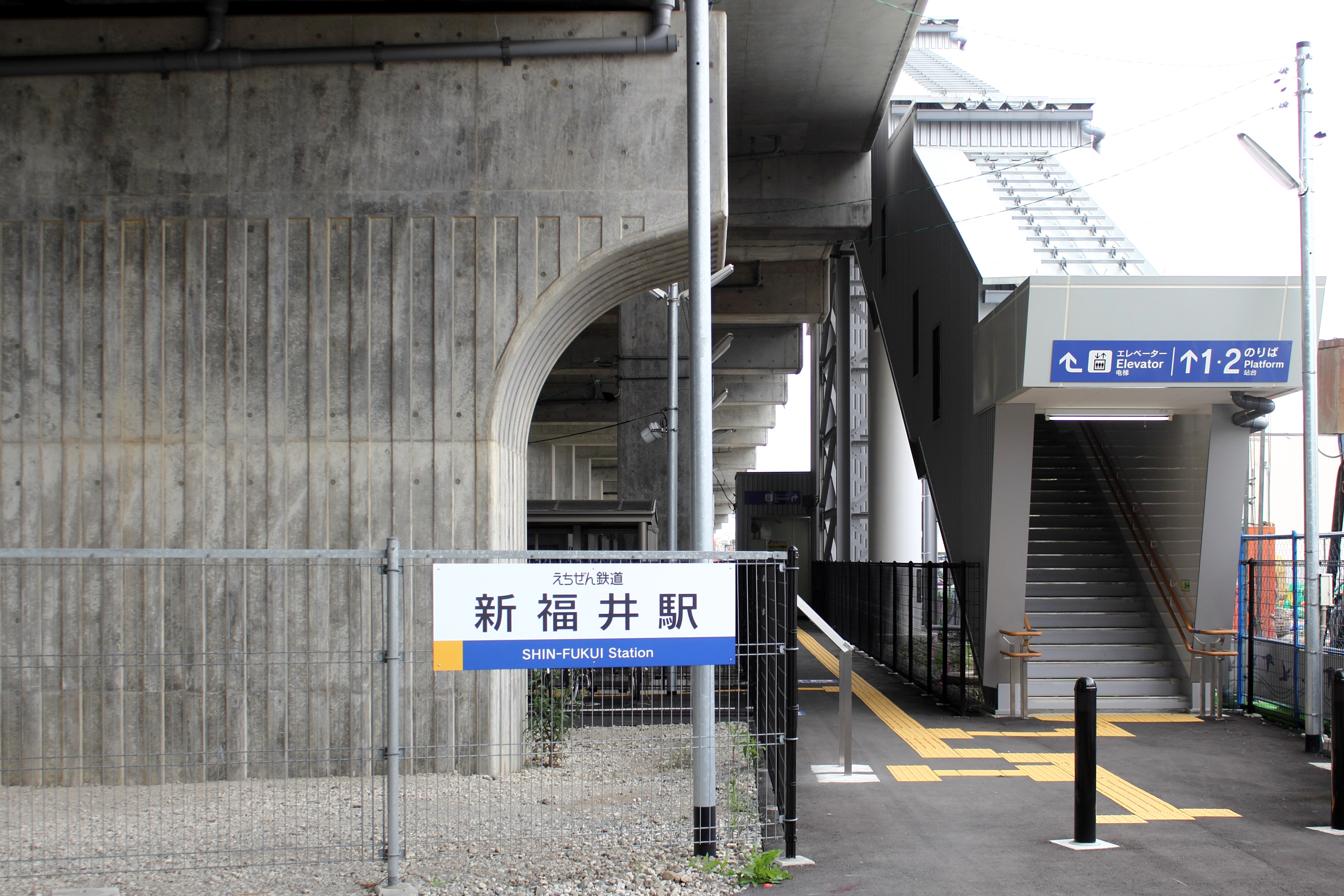
- Shin-Fukui Station in 2016

General information
- Location: 1 Hinode, Fukui-shi, Fukui-ken 910-0005; Japan
- Coordinates: 36°03′54″N 136°13′37″E
- Operator: Echizen Railway
- Lines: ■Katsuyama Eiheiji Line; ■ (Mikuni Awara Line)
- Distance: 0.5 km from Fukuiguchi
- Platforms: 2 side platforms
- Tracks: 2

Other information
- Status: Unstaffed
- Station code: E2
- Website: Official website

History
- Opened: February 11, 1914
Location
- Location within Japan

Shin-Fukui Station (新福井駅, Shin-fukui-eki) is an Echizen Railway Katsuyama Eiheiji Line railway station located in the city of Fukui, Fukui Prefecture, Japan.

== Lines ==
Shin-Fukui Station is served by the Katsuyama Eiheiji Line, and is located 0.5 kilometers from the terminus of the line at Fukui. It is also used by trains of the Mikuni Awara Line, which continue past the line's nominal terminus at Fukuiguchi and continue on to Fukui Station.

== Station layout ==
The station consists of two elevated opposed side platforms with the station building located underneath. Trains bound for Eiheijiguchi, Katsuyama and the Mikuni Awara Line use platform 1, while trains bound for Fukui use Platform 2. The station is unattended.

== Adjacent stations ==
«	Service	»
Katsuyama Eiheiji Line
Express: Does not stop at this station
Fukui	Local	Fukuiguchi

== History ==
Shin-Fukui Station was opened on February 11, 1914. The line was extended between Fukuiguchi and Fukui on September 21, 1929. On September 1, 1942 the Keifuku Electric Railway merged with Mikuni Awara Electric Railway. The station was relocated to its present location on March 23, 1997. Operations were halted from June 25, 2001. The station reopened on July 20, 2003 as an Echizen Railway station. The station had a single island platform. On September 27, 2015 the station moved to temporary facilities, and reopened as an elevated station with two opposed side platforms on June 24, 2018.

== Surrounding area ==
- The station is in the middle of central Fukui on the east side of the JR Hokuriku Main Line tracks.
- The Fukui regional government office complex is nearby; it has offices for national government agencies, including the Statistics Bureau and the MAFF Fukui office.
- Other points of interest include:
  - Fukui Passport Office
  - Fukui Ōtemachi Post Office
  - Fukui City Hinode Elementary School
  - Yōkōkan Garden
  - Fukui City History Museum

== See also ==
- List of railway stations in Japan
