= Eiheijiguchi Station =

Railway station in Eiheiji, Fukui Prefecture, Japan

Eiheijiguchi Station 永平寺口駅
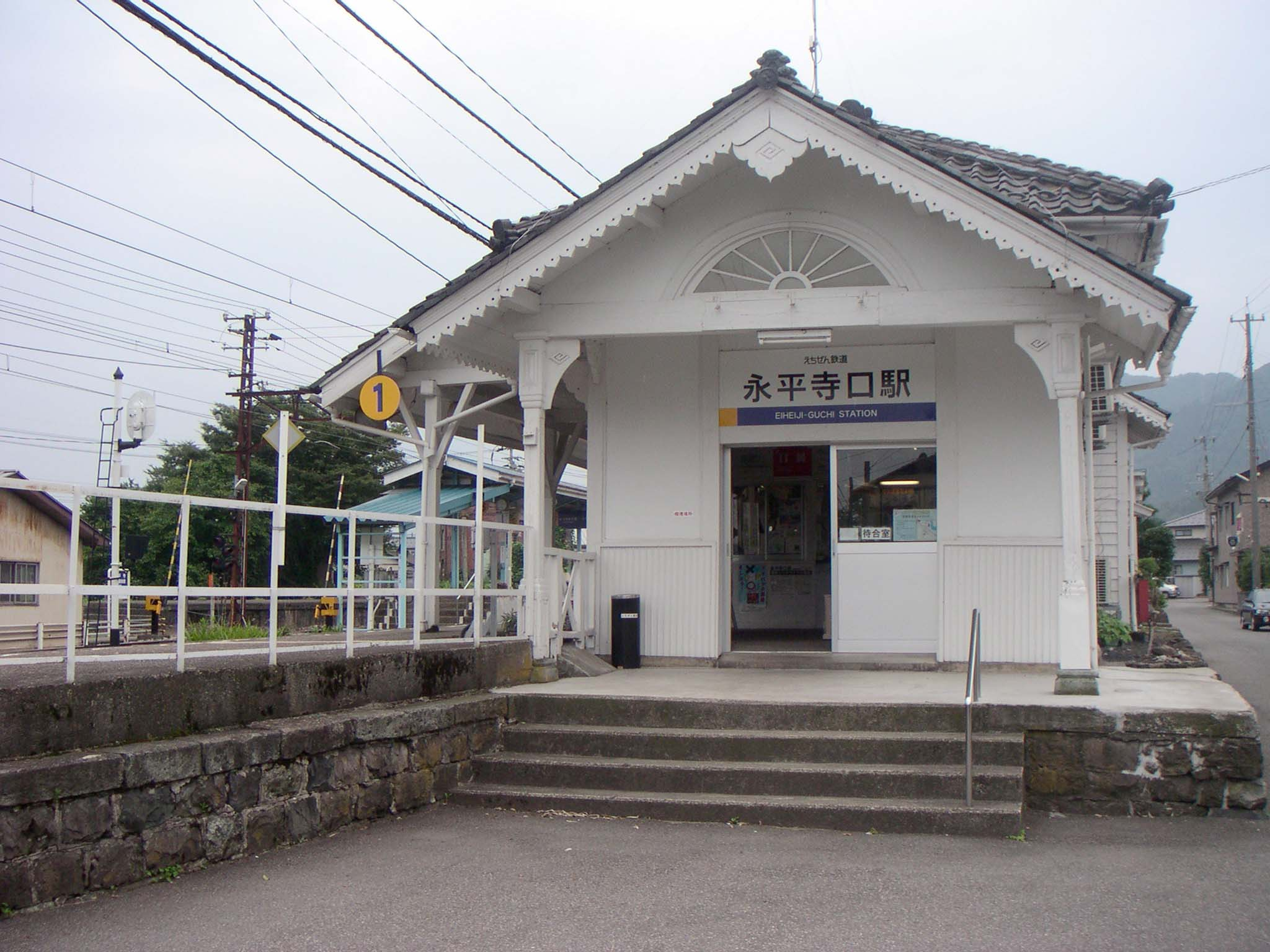
- Eiheijiguchi Station

General information
- Location: 9 Higashi-Furuichi, Eiheiji-machi, Yoshida-gun, Fukui-ken 910-1212; Japan
- Coordinates: 36°05′45″N 136°19′36″E
- Operator: Echizen Railway
- Line: ■ Katsuyama Eiheiji Line
- Distance: 10.9 km from Fukui
- Platforms: 1 side + 1 island platform
- Tracks: 3

Other information
- Status: Staffed
- Station code: E12
- Website: Official website

History
- Opened: February 11, 1914
- Former names: Eiheiji; Higashi-Furuichi (until 2003)
Location
- Location within Japan

Eiheijiguchi Station (永平寺口駅, Eiheijiguchi-eki) is a railway station on the Katsuyama Eiheiji Line in the town of Eiheiji, Fukui, Japan, operated by the private railway operator Echizen Railway.

== Lines ==
Eiheijiguchi Station is served by the Katsuyama Eiheiji Line, and is located 10.9 kilometers from the terminus of the line at Fukui.

== Station layout ==
The station consists of one side platform and one island platform connected by a level crossing. The station is staffed. The original station building from 1914 has been preserved as a community centre.

== Adjacent stations ==
| « | Service | » |
Katsuyama Eiheiji Line
| Matsuoka | Express | Sannō |
| Shiizakai | Local | Shimoshii |

== History ==
Eiheijiguchi Station was opened on February 11, 1914 as Eiheiji Station (永平寺駅, Eiheiji-eki). On the Eiheiji Railway opened the Eiheijiguchi — Eiheijimon-Mae section, with through trains from Shin-Fukui to Eiheijimon-Mae operating from April 26, 1926. The station was renamed to its present name on January 1, 1927. On December 10, 1929 the Eiheiji Railway Kanazu (now Awaraonsen) — Eiheijiguchi section opened. On December 1, 1944 the line was transferred to the Keifuku Electric Railway and the station was renamed Higashi-Furuichi (東古市駅, Higashi-Furuichi-eki). The Kanazu to Higashi-Furuichi section was closed on September 18, 1969. On December 17, 2000, two trains collided just east of the station due to a brake malfunction.

Operations were halted from June 25, 2001 due to a second accident. The spy line to Eiheiji was closed from October 21, 2001. The station was renamed back to its present name on October 21, 2001. The station reopened on July 20, 2003 as an Echizen Railway station. A new station building as completed on April 11, 2014

== Surrounding area ==
- This station is the closest to the Zen Buddhist temple Eihei-ji. Visitors transfer to Keifuku or Eiheiji community buses at the stop in front of the station.
- Other points of interest include:
  - Eiheiji Town Hall, Eiheiji Branch Office
  - National Route 364
  - National Route 416
  - Kuzuryū River

== See also ==
- List of railway stations in Japan
