= Eiheiji, Fukui =

Eiheiji 永平寺町
- Town
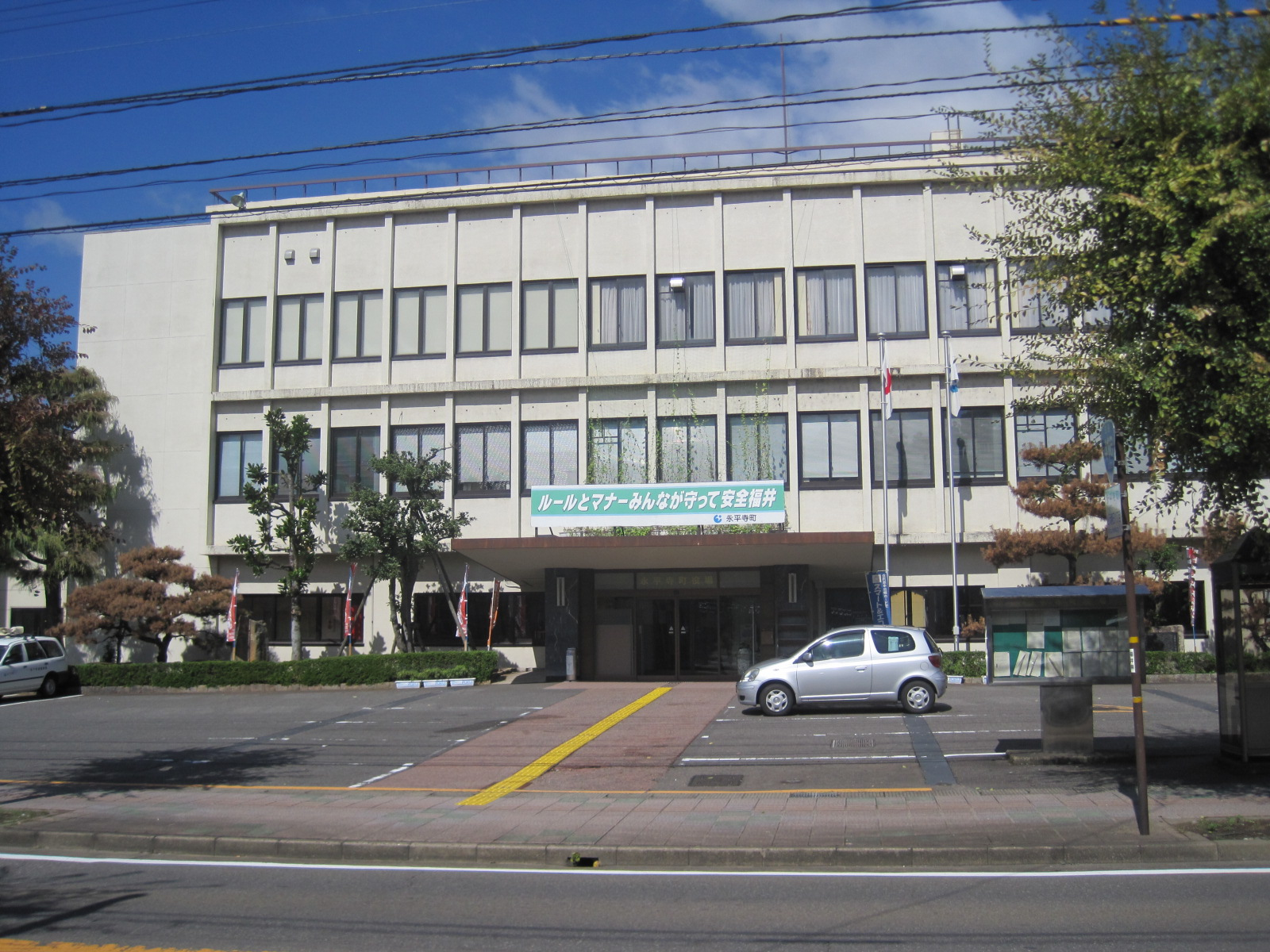
- Eiheiji Town Hall

- Flag Seal

- Location of Eiheiji in Fukui Prefecture

- Coordinates: 36°5′32″N 136°17′55″E
- Country: Japan
- Region: Chūbu (Hokuriku)
- Prefecture: Fukui
- District: Yoshida

Area
  - Total: 94.43 km^{2} (36.46 sq mi)

Population (November 1, 2025)
  - Total: 17,504
  - Density: 185.4/km^{2} (480.1/sq mi)
- Time zone: UTC+9 (Japan Standard Time)
- Phone number: 0776-61-1111
- Address: Matsuda-kasuga 1-4, Eiheiji-chō, Yoshida-gun, Fukui-ken 910-1192
- Website: Official website
- Symbols
- Flower: Prunus mume
- Tree: Tung Oil Tree

Eiheiji (永平寺町, Eiheiji-chō) is a town located in Yoshida District, Fukui Prefecture, Japan. As of 1 November 2025, the town had an estimated population of 17,504 in 6,695 households and the population density of 185 persons per km^{2}. The total area of the town was 94.43 square kilometres (36.46 sq mi). The town is named for the famous temple of Eihei-ji.

== Geography ==
Eiheiji is located in Yoshida District in northern Fukui Prefecture, in the river valley of the Kuzuryū River, which flows from east to west. From the upstream side of the Kuzuryū River, the town consists of the Kamishihi district (formerly Kamishihi village) and Eiheiji district, and downstream is the Matsuoka district (formerly Matsuoka town).

=== Neighbouring municipalities ===
Fukui Prefecture

- Awara
- Fukui
- Katsuyama

=== Climate ===
Eiheiji has a humid climate "Cfa" per the Köppen climate classification system, characterized by warm, wet summers and cold winters with heavy snowfall. The average annual temperature in Eiheiji is 14.1 °C. The average annual rainfall is 2459 mm with September as the wettest month. The temperatures are highest on average in August, at around 26.7 °C, and lowest in January, at around 2.6 °C.

== Demographics ==
Per Japanese census data, the population of Eiheiji has remained relatively steady over the past 50 years.

Historical population
Year	Pop.	±%
1970	20,244	—
1980	19,667	−2.9%
1990	19,387	−1.4%
2000	21,182	+9.3%
2010	20,647	−2.5%
2020	18,965	−8.1%

== History ==
Eiheiji is part of ancient Echizen Province, and has been populated since the Japanese Paleolithic period. Numerous Kofun period remains have been found in the area, which was part of a large shōen in the Heian period. During the Kamakura period, in 1244, the monk Dōgen established the Sōtō Zen monastery of Eihei-ji, and the present town developed as a monzen-machi town attached to the temple. During the Edo period, the area was part of the holdings of Fukui Domain. Following the Meiji restoration, it was organised into part of Yoshida District in Fukui Prefecture. With the establishment of the modern municipalities system on April 1, 1889, the villages of Shihidani, Shimoshihi and Jōhō-ji were established. These villages were merged to form the village of Shihi on March 1, 1954. On September 1, 1962, Shihi was raised to town status, and was renamed Eiheiji.

On February 13, 2006, the town of Matsuoka and the village of Kamishihi, both from Yoshida District, were merged into the town of Eiheiji.

== Government ==
Eiheiji has a mayor-council form of government with a directly elected mayor and a unicameral town legislature of 14 members. Eiheiji contributes one member to the Fukui Prefectural Assembly. In terms of national politics, the town is part of the Fukui 1st district of the lower house of the Diet of Japan.

== Economy ==
Eiheiji's economy is heavily reliant on the flow of tourists and pilgrims to the Eihei-ji temple, which serves as a sizable seminary for the Soto Zen faith. Textiles and agriculture are also important contributors to the local economy.

Aoyama Harp, the only harp manufacturer in Japan, is located in Eiheiji.

== Education ==
Eiheiji has seven public elementary schools and three middle schools operated by the town government. The town does not have a high school. The town has two vocational training schools. Fukui Prefectural University has a campus at Eiheiji, and the medical school of the University of Fukui is also located in the town.

== Transportation ==
=== Railway ===
Echizen Railway Katsuyama Eiheiji Line

- Kannonmachi - Matsuoka - Shiizakai - Eiheijiguchi - Shimoshii - Kōmyōji - Domeki - Echizen-Nonaka - Sannō - Echizen-Takehara - Kobunato

=== Highway ===
- Chūbu-Jūkan Expressway
- National Route 364
- National Route 416

== International relations ==
- Zhangjiagang, Jiangsu, China, friendship city to former Matsuoka Town since August 1997

== Local attractions ==
- Eihei-ji, head temple and seminary of the Sōtō Zen sect
- Matsuoka Kofun Cluster, National Historic Site
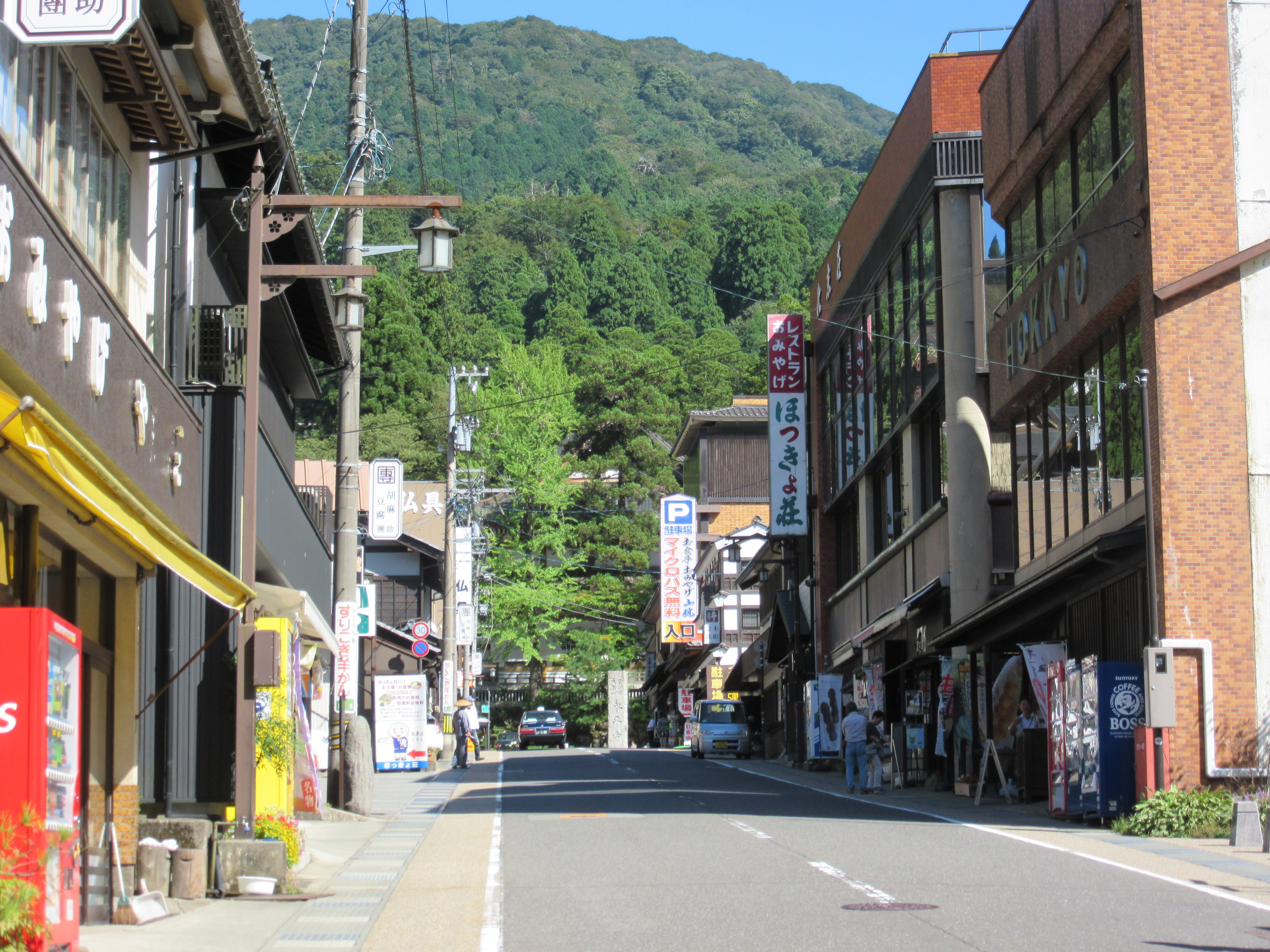
Eihei-ji monzen-machi

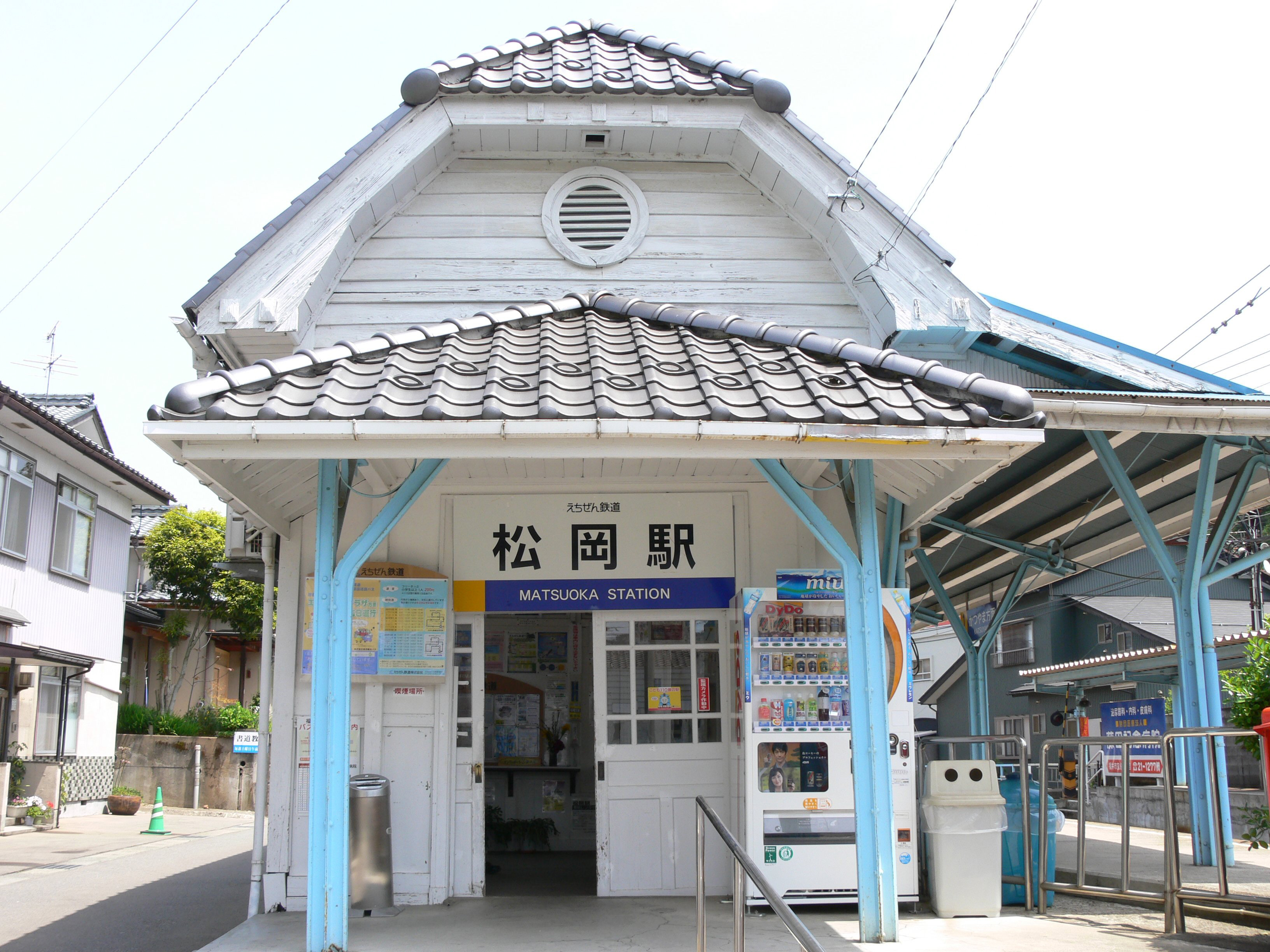
Matsuoka Station

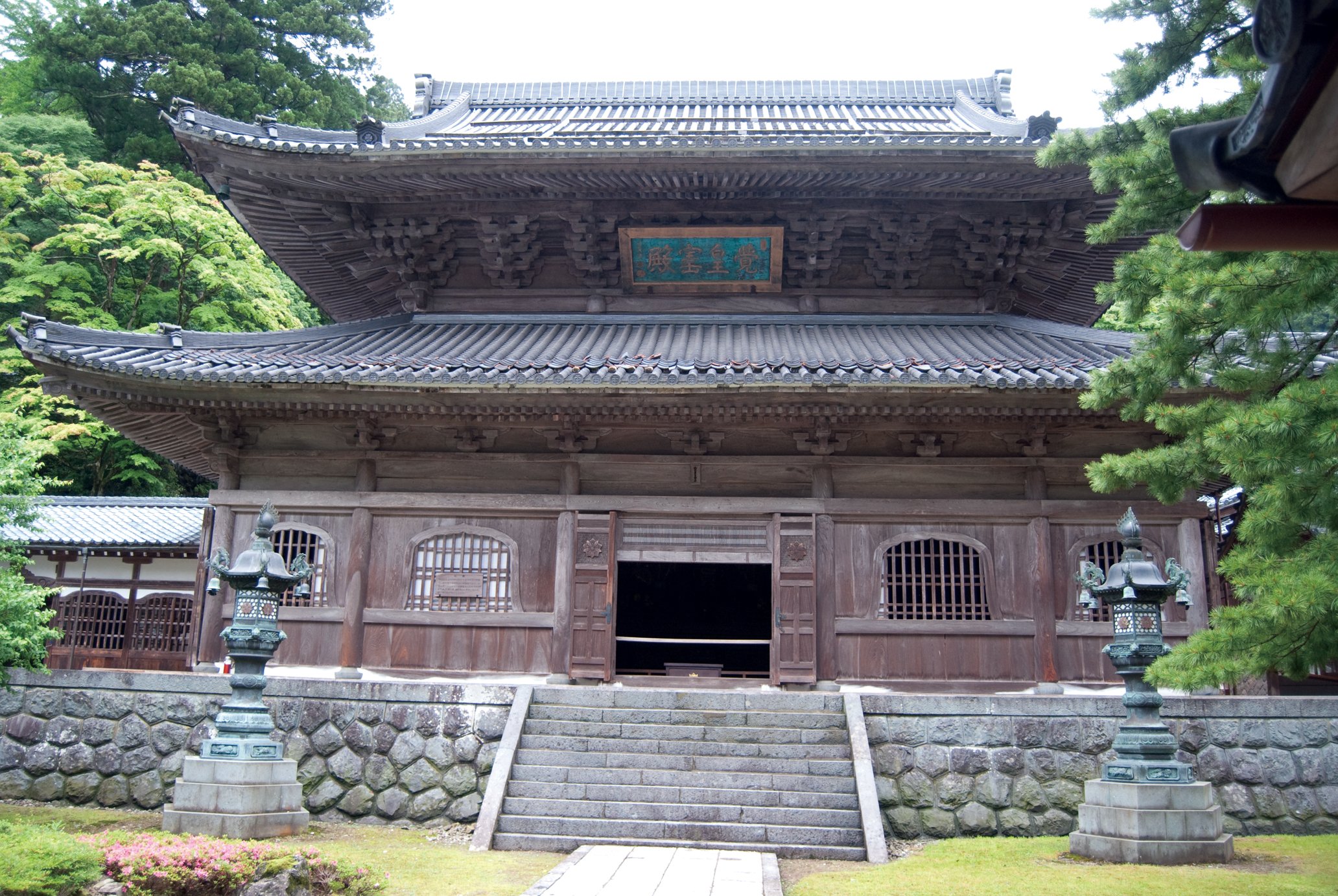
Eihei-ji Butsuden
