= Kobunato Station =

Railway station in Eiheiji, Fukui Prefecture, Japan

Kobunato Station 小舟渡駅
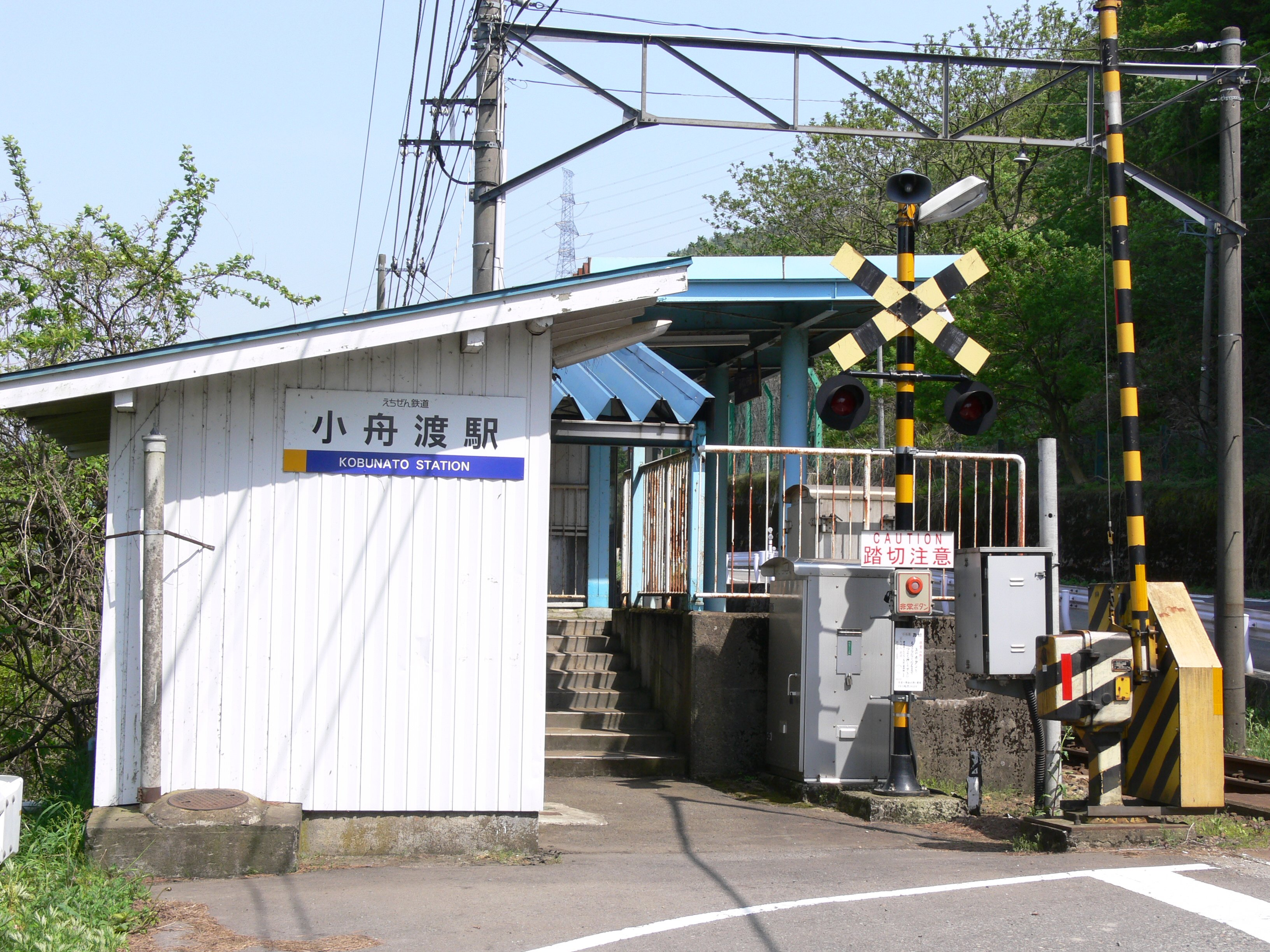
- Kobunato Station in May 2009

General information
- Location: Fujimaki, Eiheiji-machi, Yoshida-gun, Fukui-ken 910-1303; Japan
- Coordinates: 36°04′32″N 136°26′02″E
- Operator: Echizen Railway
- Line: ■ Katsuyama Eiheiji Line
- Distance: 21.2 km from Fukui
- Platforms: 1 side platform
- Tracks: 1

Other information
- Status: Unstaffed
- Station code: E19
- Website: Official website

History
- Opened: March 11, 1914

Passengers
- FY2016: 8
Location
- Location within Japan

Kobunato Station (小舟渡駅, Kobunato-eki) is an Echizen Railway Katsuyama Eiheiji Line train station located in the town of Eiheiji, Yoshida District, Fukui Prefecture, Japan.

== Lines ==
Kobunato Station is served by the Katsuyama Eiheiji Line, and is located 21.2 kilometers from the terminus of the line at Fukui.

== Station layout ==
The station consists of one side platform serving a single bi-directional track. The station is unattended.

== Adjacent stations ==
| « | Service | » |
Katsuyama Eiheiji Line
Express: Does not stop at this station
| Echizen-Takehara | Local | Hota |

== History ==
Kobunato Station was opened on March 11, 1914. Operations were halted from June 25, 2001. The station reopened on July 20, 2003 as an Echizen Railway station.

== Passenger statistics ==
In fiscal 2016, the station was used by an average of 8 passengers daily (boarding passengers only).

== Surrounding area ==
- Since the station is nestled between hills to the south and the Kuzuryū River to the north, there are few structures of note. A bridge to the other side of the river is just west of the station.
- Fukui Prefectural Route 168 passes to the south.

== See also ==
- List of railway stations in Japan
