= Hota Station (Fukui) =

Railway station in Katsuyama, Fukui Prefecture, Japan

Hota Station 保田駅
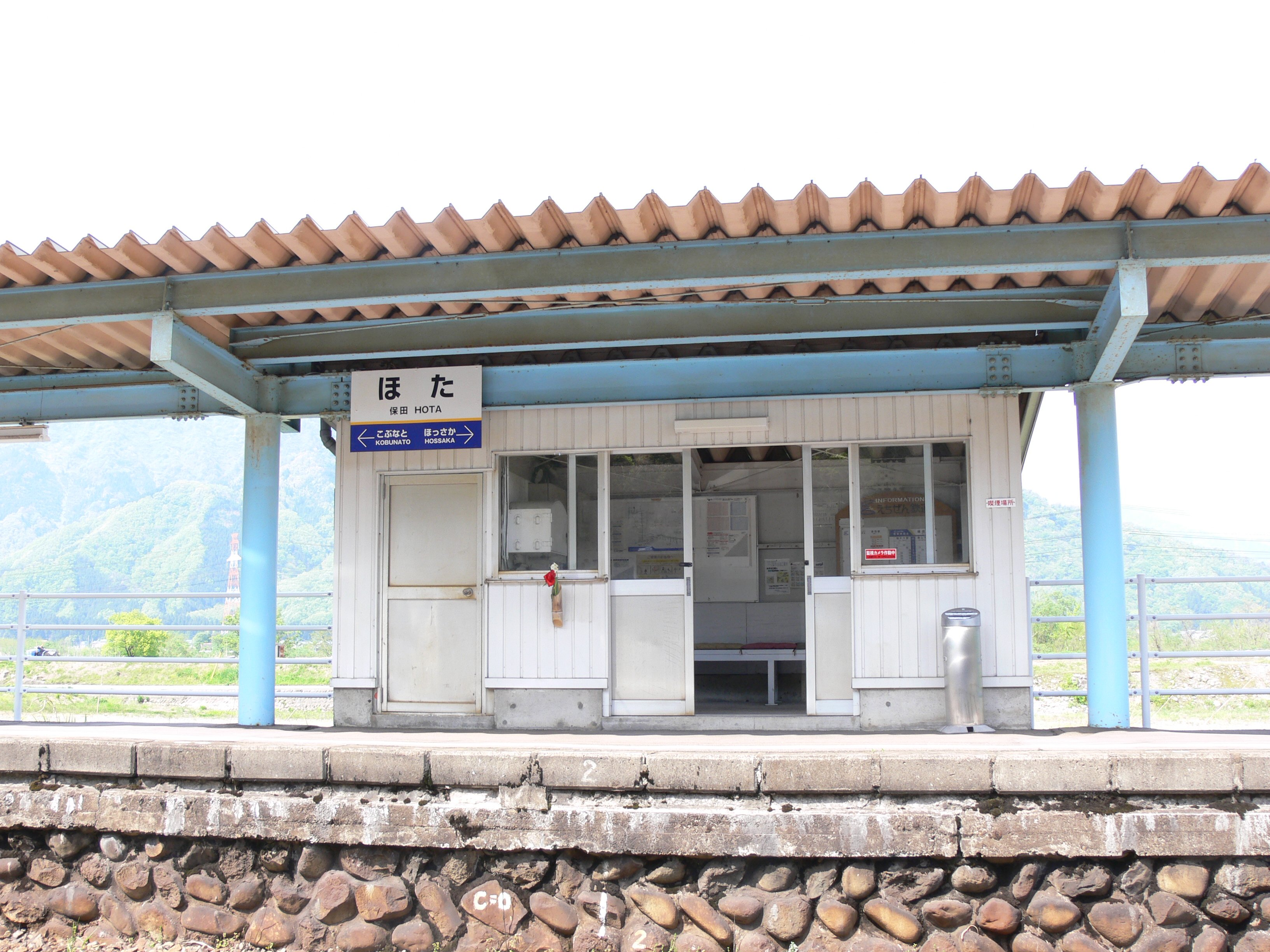
- Hota Station in May 2009

General information
- Location: Shikadanicho Hota, Katsuyama-shi, Fukui-ken 911-0848; Japan
- Coordinates: 36°04′11″N 136°27′06″E
- Operator: Echizen Railway
- Line: ■ Katsuyama Eiheiji Line
- Distance: 23.1 km from Fukui
- Platforms: 1 side platform
- Tracks: 1

Other information
- Status: Unstaffed
- Station code: E20
- Website: Official website

History
- Opened: August 21, 1916

Passengers
- FY2015: 8
Location
- Location within Japan

Hota Station (保田駅, Hota-eki) is an Echizen Railway Katsuyama Eiheiji Line railway station located in the city of Katsuyama, Fukui Prefecture, Japan.

== Lines ==
Hota Station is served by the Katsuyama Eiheiji Line, and is located 23.1 kilometers from the terminus of the line at Fukui.

== Station layout ==
The station consists of one side platform serving a single bi-directional track. The station is unattended.

== Adjacent stations ==
«	Service	»
Katsuyama Eiheiji Line
Express: Does not stop at this station
Kobunato	Local	Hossaka

== History ==
Hota Station was opened on August 21, 1916. Operations were halted from June 25, 2001. The station reopened on October 19, 2003 as an Echizen Railway station.

== Passenger statistics ==
In fiscal 2016, the station was used by an average of 8 passengers daily (boarding passengers only).

== Surrounding area ==
- Since the station is nestled between hills to the south and the Kuzuryū River to the north, there are few structures of note. Two light industrial plants lie to the southeast.
- Fukui Prefectural Route 168 passes to the north.

== See also ==
- List of railway stations in Japan
