= Katsuyama Eiheiji Line =

Railway line in Fukui Prefecture, Japan

Echizen Railway Katsuyama Eiheiji Line
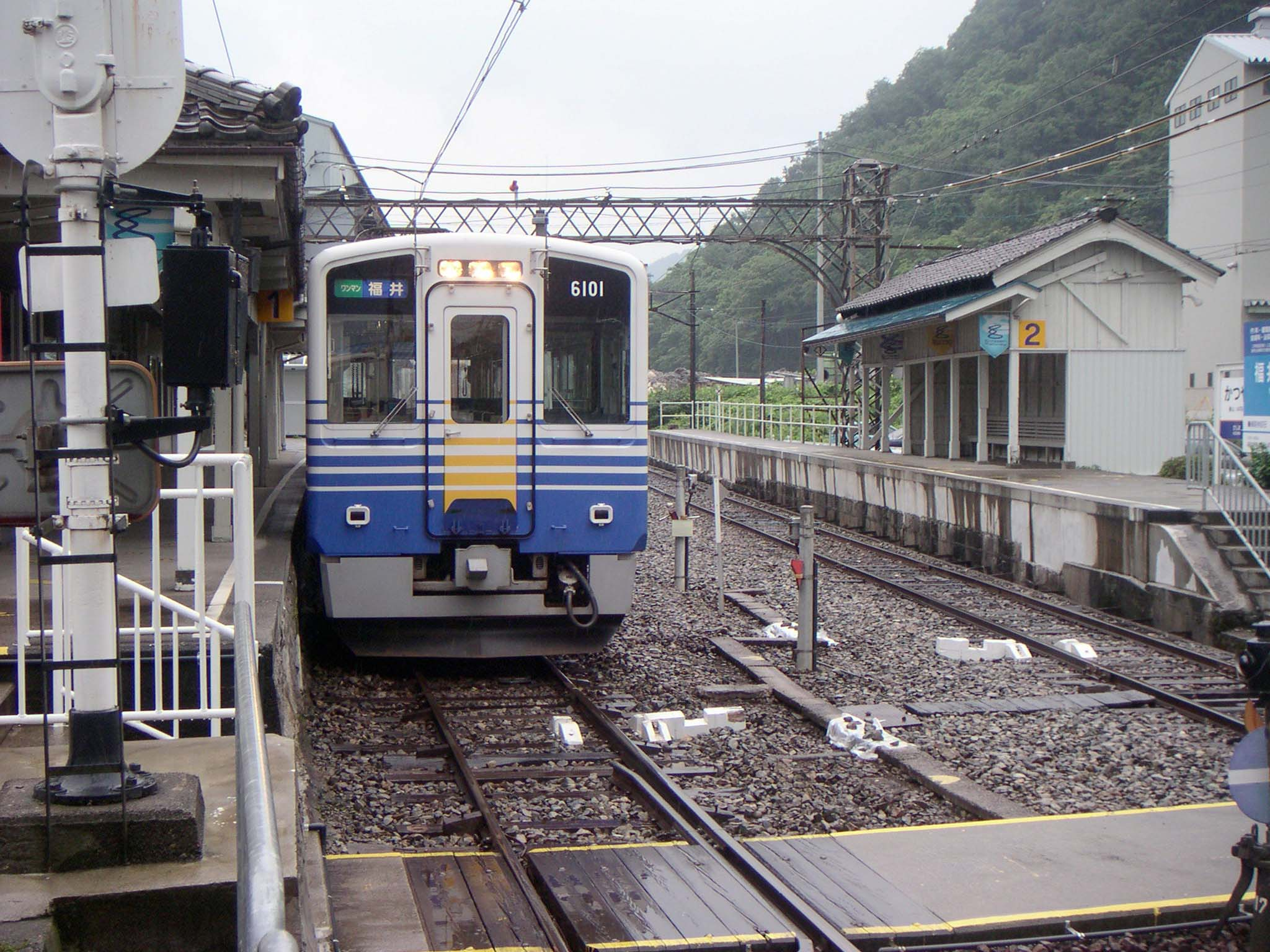
- Echizen Railway MC6101 series train at Katsuyama Station

Overview
- Owner: Echizen Railway
- Locale: Fukui Prefecture
- Termini: Fukui; Katsuyama
- Stations: 22

Service
- Type: Heavy rail

History
- Opened: 1914

Technical
- Line length: 27.8 km (17.3 mi)
- Track gauge: 1,067 mm (3 ft 6 in)
- Electrification: 600 V DC, overhead catenary

The Katsuyama Eiheiji Line (勝山永平寺線, Katsuyama Eiheiji-sen) is a railway line operated by Echizen Railway in Fukui Prefecture. The line extends 27.8 km from the city of Fukui to Katsuyama with a total of 23 stations. It was operated by Keifuku Electric Railway until 2001; Echizen Railway took over the line in 2003.

== Service ==
Trains run twice per hour during the day; during morning peak hours between 7:00 and 9:00, three trains run per hour. There is a single Fukui-bound rapid train each morning, as well as a local "Mezamashi Train" (lit. "wake-up train") departing Katsuyama at 5:09 every Monday morning that connects with Osaka and Nagoya-bound JR West limited express trains departing from Fukui Station.

== History ==
Kyoto Dentō, a former body of Keifuku began operating the line in 1914 between Shin-Fukui Station and Ichiarakawa Station (now Echizen-Takehara Station). The line was extended in 1918 to Ōno-Sanban Station (later renamed to Keifuku-Ōno), and again to Fukui Station in 1929. In 1974 due to falling ridership, the section from Katsuyama to Keifuku-Ōno was closed. In 1998, Keifuku proposed that the section from Eiheijiguchi to Katsuyama also be closed, but after local opposition the line was kept open. On December 17, 2000, a train entering from the Eiheiji Line at Higashi-Furuichi (now Eiheijiguchi) Station could not stop due to brake problems and collided with another train on the Echizen Main Line, killing the driver and injuring 24 passengers. Only six months later on June 24, 2001, two trains going different directions collided head-on between Hota and Hossaka stations on the Echizen Main Line injuring 24. These two accidents forced Keifuku to cease operation in 2001 and eventually transfer its Fukui Prefecture lines to Echizen Railway in 2003.

=== Chronology ===
- February 11, 1914: Kyōto Dentō begins operations between Shin-Fukui — Ichiarakawa (now Echizen-Takehara) stations.
- March 11, 1914: Ichiarakawa — Katsuyama section opens. Kannonchō Station opens.
- April 10, 1914: Katsuyama — Ōnoguchi section opens.
- September 1, 1914: Shiiguchi Station renamed to Fukuiguchi Station.
- May 13, 1915: Oiwakeguchi Station opens.
- April 17, 1916: Shinbo (now Echizen-Shinbo) Station opens.
- August 21, 1915: Hota Station opens.
- September 1, 1918: Ōnoguchi — Ōno-Sanban section opens. Hōki Station opens. Passenger operations at Ōnoguchi Station end.
- May 23, 1919: Shimabashi (now Echizen-Shimabashi) Station opens
- May 19, 1920: Kōmyōji Station opens.
- October 10, 1920: Shinzaike Station opens.
- January 1, 1927: Eiheiji Station renamed to Eiheijiguchi Station.
- By 1929: Fujishima Station renamed to Higashi-Fujishima Station.
- September 21, 1929: Fukui — Shin-Fukui section opens. Shin-Fukui — Fukuiguchi section double-tracked. Passenger operations at Shin-Fukui Station end.
- November 20, 1929: Fukui — Shin-Fukui section double-tracked.
- By 1931: Shimoarakawa Station renamed to Rokuroshiguchi Station.
- May 1, 1931: Hishima Station opens.
- August 20, 1932: Kaihotsu (now Echizen-Kaihotsu) Station opens.
- By 1934: Shimabashi Station renamed to Echizen-Shimabashi Station; Rokuroshiguchi Station renamed to Shimoarakawa-Rokuroshiguchi Station.
- April 22, 1935: Fukuiguchi — Kaihotsu section double-tracked.
- March 2, 1942: Keifuku Electric Railway splits off from Kyōto Dentō, merges with Mikuni Awara Electric Railway. Rail line known as Echizen Main Line.
- July 1, 1943: Passenger operations at Shin-Fukui Station end.
- April 20, 1944: Hishima Station closed.
- December 1, 1944: Eiheijiguchi Station renamed Higashi-Furuichi Station.
- April 5, 1945: Hishima Station reopens.
- June 28, 1948: A large earthquake forces the temporary closure of the line until August 1948.
- August 15, 1950: Echizen-Nonaka Station opens as a temporary station; closed on August 18.
- September 10, 1950: Echizen-Nonaka Station reopens as a regular station.
- August 1, 1951: Kaihotsu Station renamed to Echizen-Kaihotsu Station. Shinbo Station renamed to Echizen-Shinbo Station.
- December 15, 1951: Shimoshii Station opens.
- October 1, 1952: After repeated halts, passenger operations at Ōnoguchi Station restart permanently.
- May 1, 1953: Yokomakura Station renamed Nakatsugawa Station.
- September 1, 1955: Ichiarakawa Station closed. Echizen-Takehara Station opens.
- October 1, 1955: Ōno-Sanban Station renamed Keifuku-Ōno Station.
- December 16, 1961: Yomogi Station opens.
- August 13, 1974: Katsuyama — Keifuku-Ōno section closed.
- August 1, 1980: Freight operations between Fukuiguchi — Katsuyama end.
- October 26, 1980: Freight operations between Shin-Fukui — Fukuiguchi end.
- April 20, 1989: Driver-only operation initiated during non-peak hours.
- March 20, 1991: Driver-only operation initiated on all trains throughout the day.
- December 17, 2000: Two trains from the Echizen Main Line and Eiheiji Line collide head-on between Shiizakai and Higashi-Furuichi stations.
- June 24, 2001: Two trains collide head-on between Hota and Hossaka stations.
- June 25, 2001: Operations halted on entire line.
- February 1, 2003: Echizen Main Line renamed Katsuyama Eiheiji Line; transferred to Echizen Railway.
- February 20, 2003: Higashi-Furuichi Station renamed Eiheijiguchi Station.
- July 20, 2003: Operation on Fukui — Eiheijiguchi section restarts.
- October 19, 2003: Operation on Eiheijiguchi — Katsuyama section restarts.
- April 1, 2005: Kobunato and Hota stations begin serving all local trains; rapid trains pass.
- April 9, 2006: Due to construction of the Hokuriku Shinkansen, Shin-Fukui — Fukuiguchi section single-tracked.

=== Former connecting lines ===
- Eiheijiguchi Station - The Eiheiji Railway Co. opened a 25 km line to its namesake town in 1929, connecting with the Hokuriku Main Line at Awara Onsen. The company merged with the Keifuku Electric Railway Co. in 1944. The Awara Onsen - Higashi-Furuichi section closed in 1969, and the section to Eijeihi closed in 2002 after a fatal head-on collision resulted in services being suspended and subsequently never resumed.

== Rolling stock ==
Echizen Railway uses twenty-five cars total in its entire railway. The main type active is the MC6101 with twelve cars, followed by MC2101 with eight cars, MC6001 with two cars, and three other types with one car each.

== Stations ==
No.	Station	Japanese	Distance (km)	Rapid	Transfers	Location
E1	Fukui※	福井駅	0.0	●	JR West: Hokuriku Main Line; Fukui Railway: Fukubu Line (Fukui-eki)	Fukui
E2	Shin-Fukui	新福井駅	0.5	●		Fukui
E3	Fukuiguchi※	福井口駅	1.5	●	Echizen Railway: Mikuni Awara Line	Fukui
E4	Echizen-Kaihotsu※	越前開発駅	2.4	●		Fukui
E5	Echizen-Shinbo※	越前新保駅	3.4	●		Fukui
E6	Oiwakeguchi	追分口駅	4.4	●		Fukui
E7	Higashi-Fujishima	東藤島駅	5.3	●		Fukui
E8	Echizen-Shimabashi	越前島橋駅	6.0	●		Fukui
E9	Kannonmachi※	観音町駅	7.3	●		Eiheiji, Yoshida District
E10	Matsuoka※	松岡駅	8.4	●		Eiheiji, Yoshida District
E11	Shiizakai	志比堺駅	9.3	｜		Eiheiji, Yoshida District
E12	Eiheijiguchi※	永平寺口駅	10.9	●		Eiheiji, Yoshida District
E13	Shimoshii	下志比駅	11.9	｜		Eiheiji, Yoshida District
E14	Kōmyōji	光明寺駅	12.7	｜		Eiheiji, Yoshida District
E15	Domeki	轟駅	14.2	｜		Eiheiji, Yoshida District
E16	Echizen-Nonaka	越前野中駅	15.7	｜		Eiheiji, Yoshida District
E17	Sannō※	山王駅	17.2	●		Eiheiji, Yoshida District
E18	Echizen-Takehara	越前竹原駅	19.3	●		Eiheiji, Yoshida District
E19	Kobunato	小舟渡駅	21.2	｜		Eiheiji, Yoshida District
E20	Hota	保田駅	23.1	｜		Katsuyama
E21	Hossaka	発坂駅	24.5	●		Katsuyama
E22	Hishima	比島駅	26.4	▲		Katsuyama
E23	Katsuyama※	勝山駅	27.8	●		Katsuyama

- All stations are located in Fukui Prefecture.
- Rapid trains: ● - rapid and local trains stop, | - rapid trains pass, ▲ - rapid and some local trains pass
- Stations marked with a ※ are staffed.
- Local trains stop at every station; some local trains pass Hishima.
