= Japan National Route 416 =

Road in Japan

National Route 416
- 国道416号
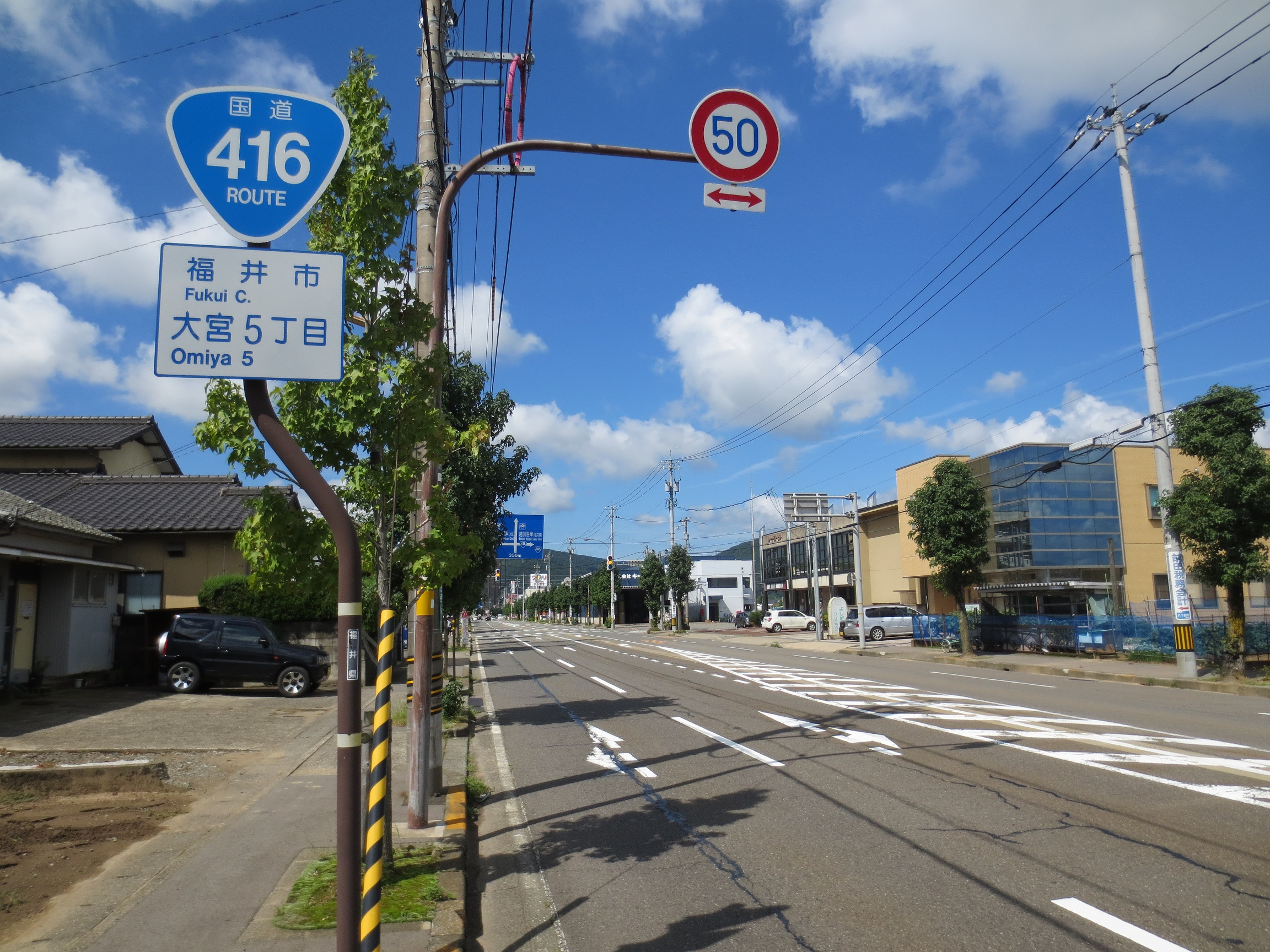

Route information
- Length: 86.3 km (53.6 mi)

Location
- Country: Japan

Highway system
- National highways of Japan; Expressways of Japan
← National Route 415	→ National Route 417

National Route 416 is a national highway of Japan connecting Fukui, Fukui and Komatsu, Ishikawa in Japan, with a total length of 86.3 km (53.62 mi).
