= Fukui Station (Fukui) =

Railway station in Fukui, Fukui Prefecture, Japan

Fukui Station 福井駅
- Shinkansen station in October 2026

General information
- Location: 1-1-1 Chūō, Fukui, Fukui Prefecture; Japan
- Coordinates: 36.0621268°N 136.2233233°E
- Operator: JR West; Hapi-Line Fukui; Echizen Railway; Fukui Railway
- Lines: Hokuriku Shinkansen; ■ Etsumi-Hoku Line (Kuzuryū Line); Hapi-Line Fukui Line; ■ Katsuyama Eiheiji Line; ■ Mikuni Awara Line; ■ Fukubu Line (Fukui-eki)
- Connections: Fukui Railway Fukubu Line (Fukui-eki Station); Bus terminal

History
- Opened: 1896

Services
Preceding station	JR West	Following station
Echizen-Takefu towards Tsuruga	Hokuriku Shinkansen Kagayaki	Awaraonsen towards Nagano
Echizen-Takefu towards Tsuruga	Hokuriku Shinkansen Hakutaka	Awaraonsen towards Jōetsumyōkō
Echizen-Takefu towards Tsuruga	Hokuriku Shinkansen Tsurugi	Awaraonsen towards Toyama
Location

Fukui Station (福井駅, Fukui-eki) is the main railway station of Fukui, Fukui Prefecture, Japan, operated by West Japan Railway Company (JR West), and the third-sector operators Hapi-Line Fukui and Echizen Railway.

== Lines ==
Fukui Station is served by the following railway companies and lines:

- JR West
  - Hokuriku Shinkansen
  - Etsumi-Hoku Line (This line formally begins at Echizen-Hanandō Station, but trains run through into this station)
- Hapi-Line Fukui
  - Hapi-Line Fukui Line
- Echizen Railway
  - Katsuyama Eiheiji Line
  - Mikuni Awara Line (This line formally begins at Fukuiguchi Station, but trains run through into this station)

A tram stop in front of the station, Fukui-eki Station (福井駅停留場, Fukui-eki teiryūjō), is served by:

- Fukui Railway
  - Fukubu Line

== Station layout ==
The tracks and platforms of JR West, Hapi-Line Fukui, and Echizen Railway are all elevated.

=== JR West & Hapi-Line Fukui ===
The conventional portion of the station, located on the west side, consists of two island platforms and five tracks.

The Shinkansen portion, on the east side, consists of a single elevated island platform serving 2 tracks. There are no passing tracks. It is the only station on the main Shinkansen network to have this compact layout. The façade is composed of a rectangular glass face with faux-wood louvers shaped to evoke the karamon gate of the Ichijōdani Asakura Family Historic Ruins.

The two sides are connected by a ground-level main concourse outside the ticket gates, as well as a transfer gate within the ticket gates. The Shinkansen side has two "Midori no Madoguchi" staffed ticket offices.

==== Tracks ====
1・3	■ Hapi-Line Fukui Line	for Daishoji, Kanazawa
2	■ Etsumi-Hoku Line (Kuzuryu Line)	for Kuzuryūko

4・5	■ Hapi-Line Fukui Line	for Takefu, Tsuruga

11	■ Hokuriku Shinkansen	for Kanazawa, Tokyo
12	■ Hokuriku Shinkansen	for Tsuruga

West entrance in July 2022

Shinkansen platform in April 2024

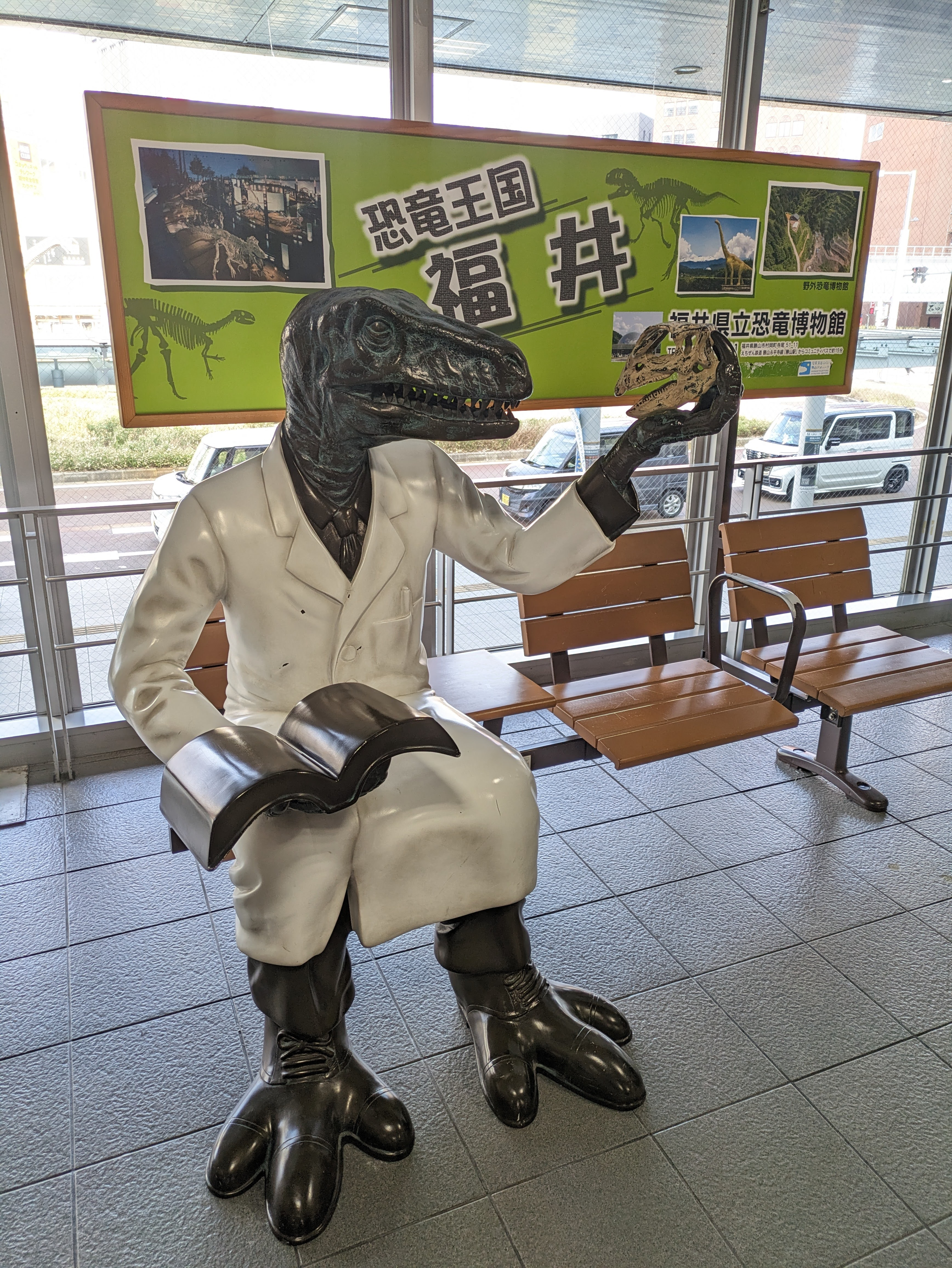
"Dinosaur Professor" sculpture

=== Echizen Railway ===
The Echizen Railway station abuts the northeast side of the Shinkansen building and has two tracks serving one island platform. The tracks dead-end onto a storage area within the station building which helps avoid needing to expend peak-hour track capacity deadheading trains on the single-track line leading to the station.

==== Tracks ====
1	■ Mikuni Awara Line	for Nishi-Nagata and Mikuni-Minato
2	■ Katsuyama Eiheiji Line	for Eiheijiguchi and Katsuyama

Station building in April 2024

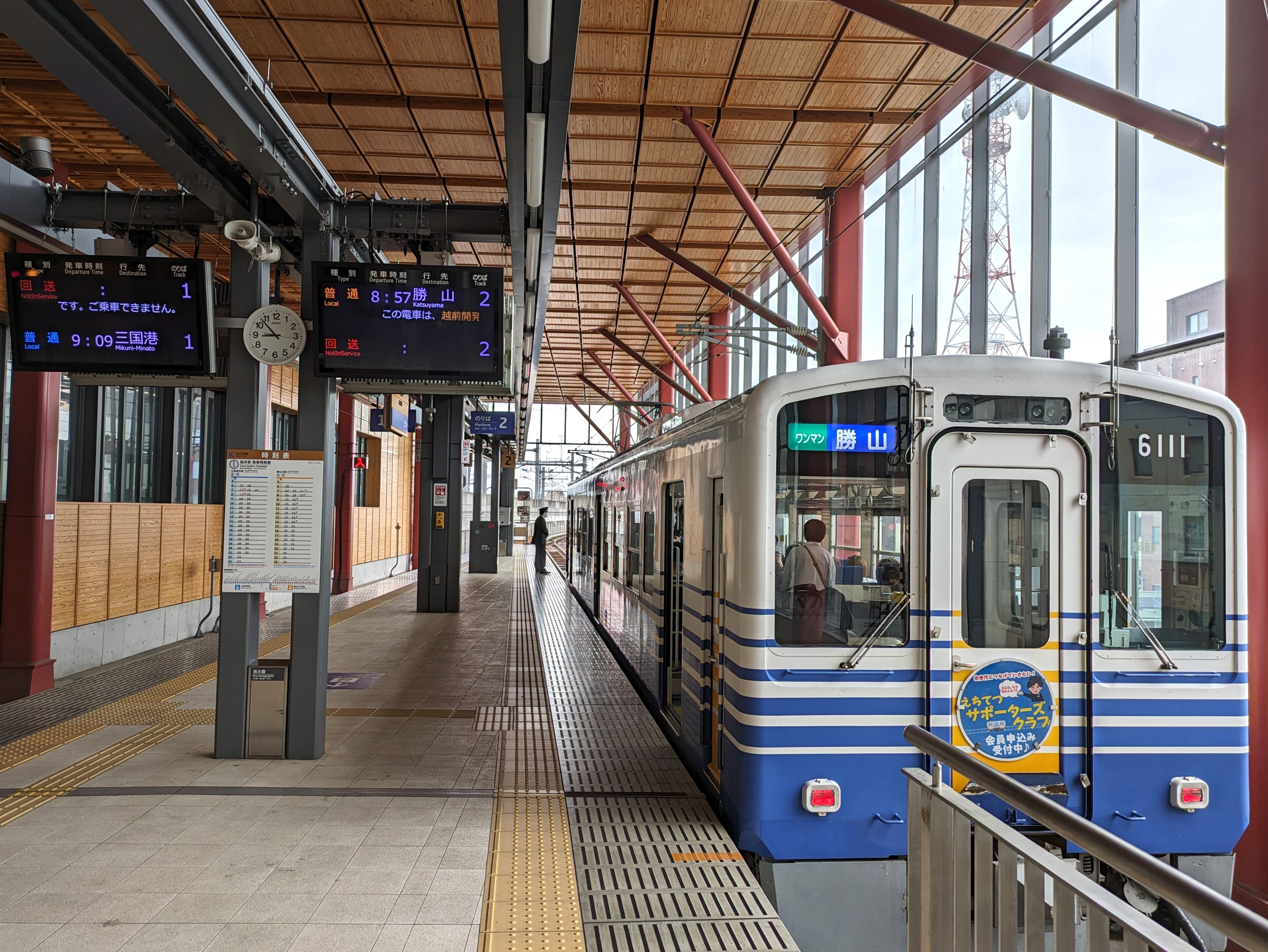
Platform in May 2024

Ticket gate

== Adjacent stations ==
«	Service	»
Etsumi Hoku Line
Terminus	Local	Echizen-Hanandō
Hapi-Line Fukui Line
Sabae	Rapid	Terminus
Echizen-Hanandō	Local	Morita
Echizen Railway Mikuni-Awara Line
Terminus	Local	Shin-Fukui
Echizen Railway Katsuyama-Eiheiji Line
Terminus	Local	Shin-Fukui
Fukui Railway Fukubu Line (Fukui-eki Station)
Fukui Castle Ruins-daimyomachi	Special Limited Express	Terminus
Fukui Castle Ruins-daimyomachi	Limited Express	Terminus
Fukui Castle Ruins-daimyomachi	Local	Terminus

== History ==
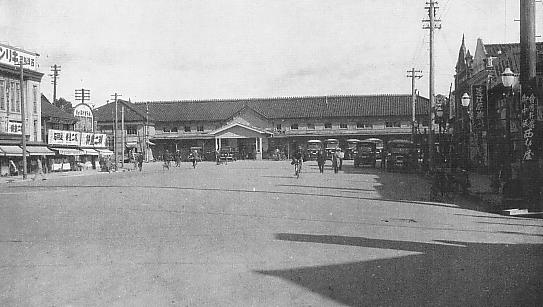
The national railways station building during the Taishō era

The station opened on 15 July 1896 when the Japanese government extended the Hokuriku Line from Tsuruga to Fukui. The line was extended further north to Komatsu the following year.

Kyoto Dentō's Echizen Electric Railway line, today the Katsuyama Eiheiji Line, began operations in 1914 and initially terminated at Shin-Fukui some distance northeast of the national railway station. After the appeal of a more convenient transfer became too strong to ignore, the line was extended to Fukui Station on 21 September 1929 ahead of a major commemoration of a historical monk at Eihei-ji.

The Kyoto Dentō station and line were handed over to Keifuku Electric Railroad on 2 March 1942, with the line being renamed Echizen Main Line.

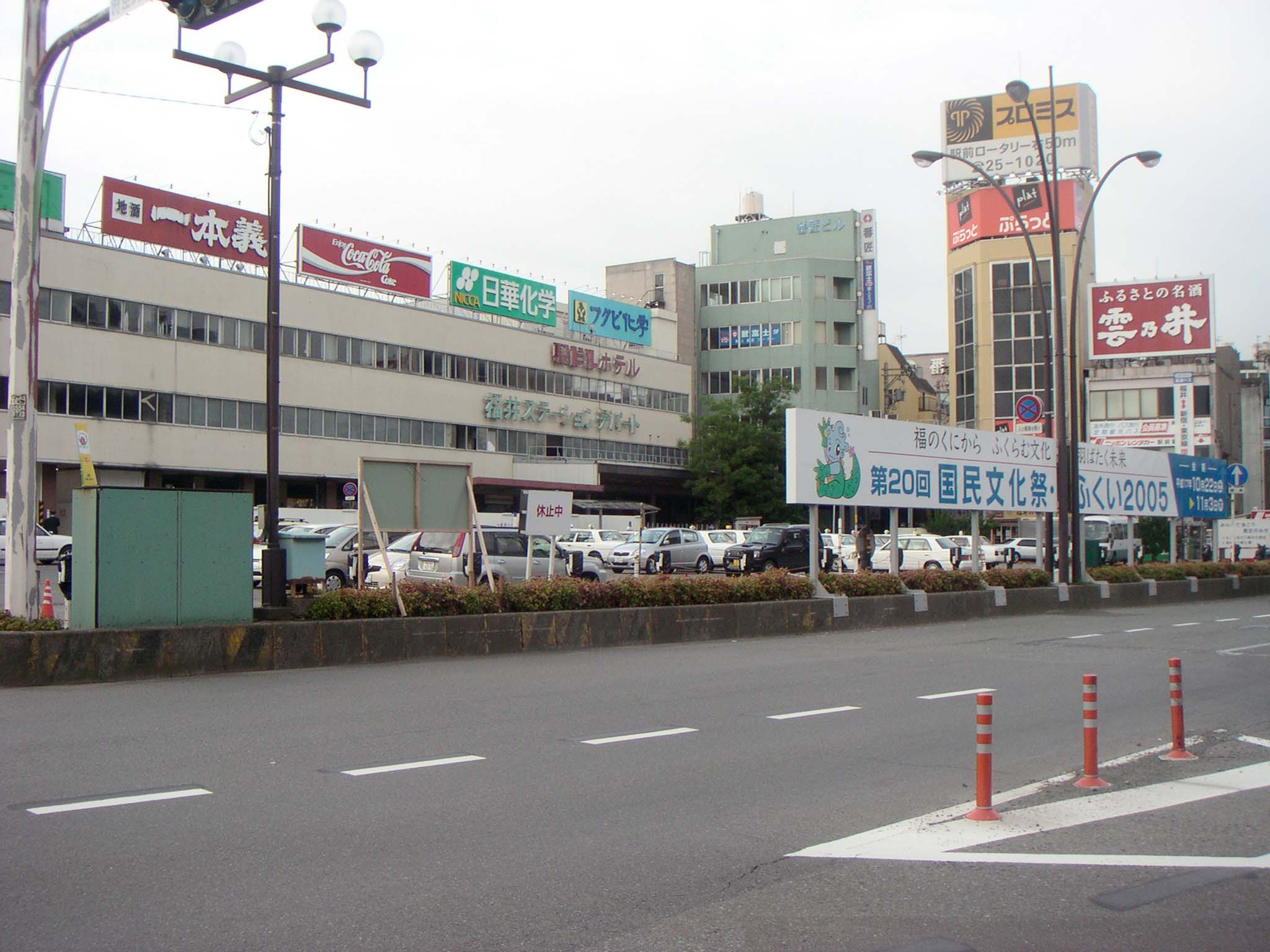
The minshū-eki station building in 2005

The station building of the national railways burned down during the bombing of Fukui of 1945. It was rebuilt and reopened in 1947. The station then suffered damage during the 1948 Fukui earthquake. Following repairs, the station building burned down again in a fire in 1951. The building was replaced by a three-story reinforced concrete minshū-eki station building which opened in June 1952.

With the privatization of JNR on 1 April 1987, the JNR station came under the control of JR West.

In 1996, works began to elevate both the JR West and Keifuku stations as well as approximately 3 kilometre sections of the respective railway lines through the surrounding city center. Keifuku moved to temporary station facilities and tracks in 1997, with JR West following in stages in 1999 and 2000.

Keifuku was forced to pause rail operations in the Fukui area in 2001 following two frontal collisions between its trains. Echizen Railway was conceived to rescue the railway, taking over on 2 February 2003 and resuming services on 20 July 2003.

The elevated infrastructure for the Hokuriku Main Line opened on 18 April 2005.

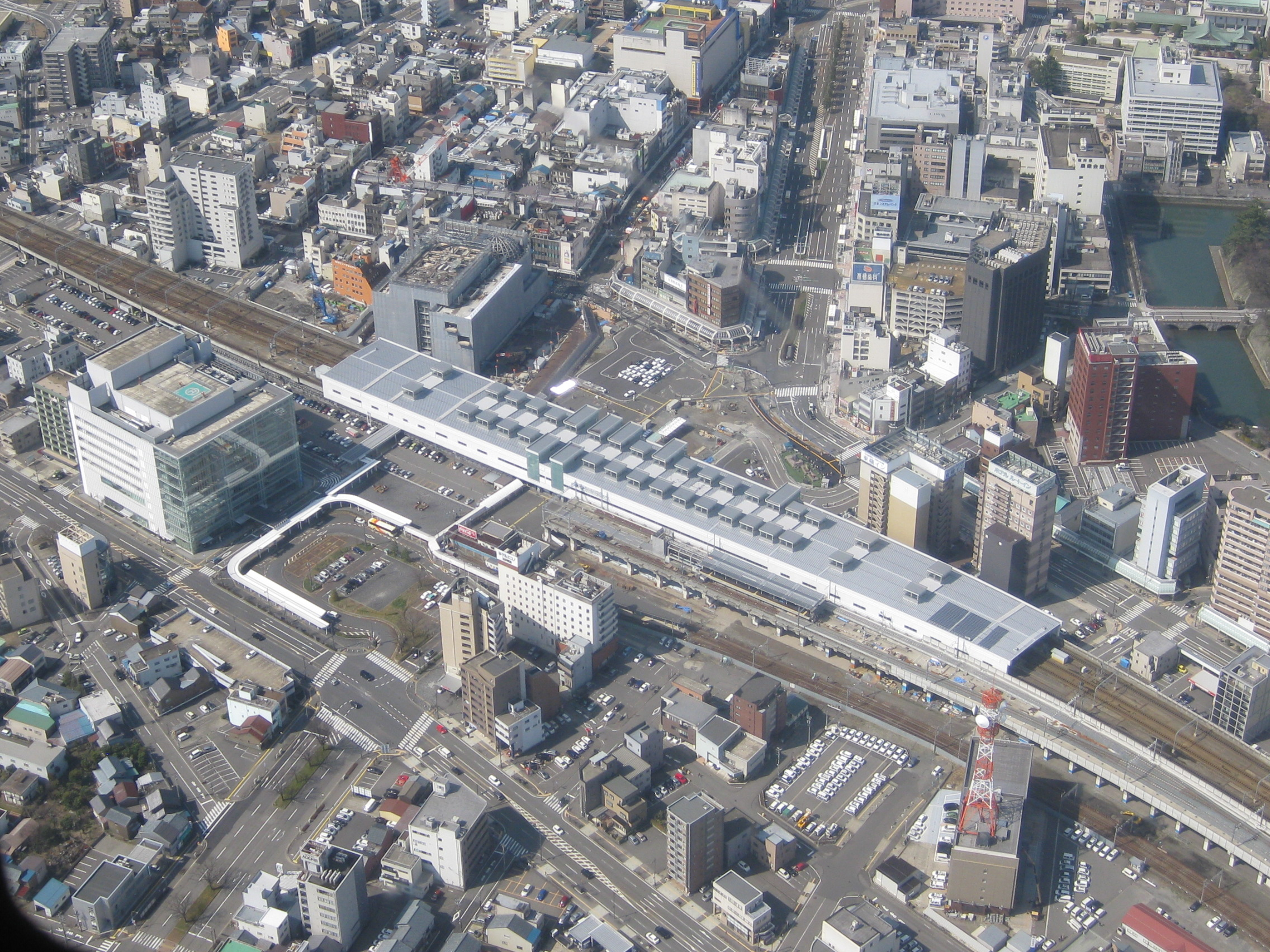
View from above in March 2015, showing the completed elevated Hokuriku Main Line station, and the temporary Echizen Railway station on the future Shinkansen viaduct

Construction of a portion of the Hokuriku Shinkansen viaduct around Fukui Station was approved and began in 2005 and was completed in February 2009, ahead of the rest of the Tsuruga extension. In September 2015, Echizen Railway moved to a second temporary station, this time on the Shinkansen viaduct. The permanent elevated station and tracks for Echizen Railway opened on 24 June 2018. Construction of the platforms serving the Hokuriku Shinkansen was completed in August 2022. The Hokuriku Shinkansen extension to Tsuruga was opened on 16 March 2024, with the Hokuriku Main Line being transferred to Hapi-Line Fukui the same day.

=== Fukui Railway Fukui-eki Station ===
Fukui-Ekimae Station on the Fukui Railway Fukubu Line was originally located approximately 150 meters to the west of the JR station. On 27 March 2016, the station was relocated as Fukui-eki Station to the square in front of the west building of the JR station.

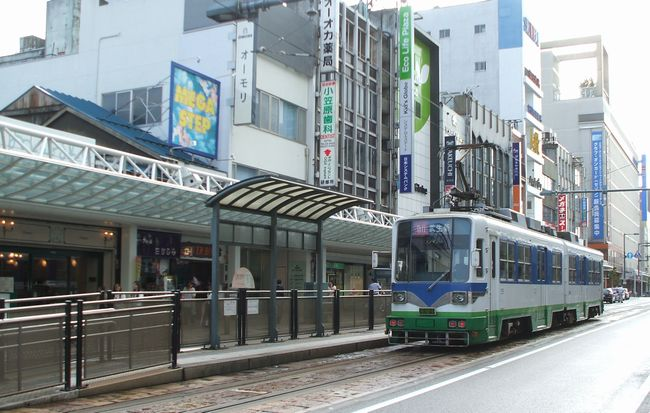
Fukui-Ekimae Station in September 2007

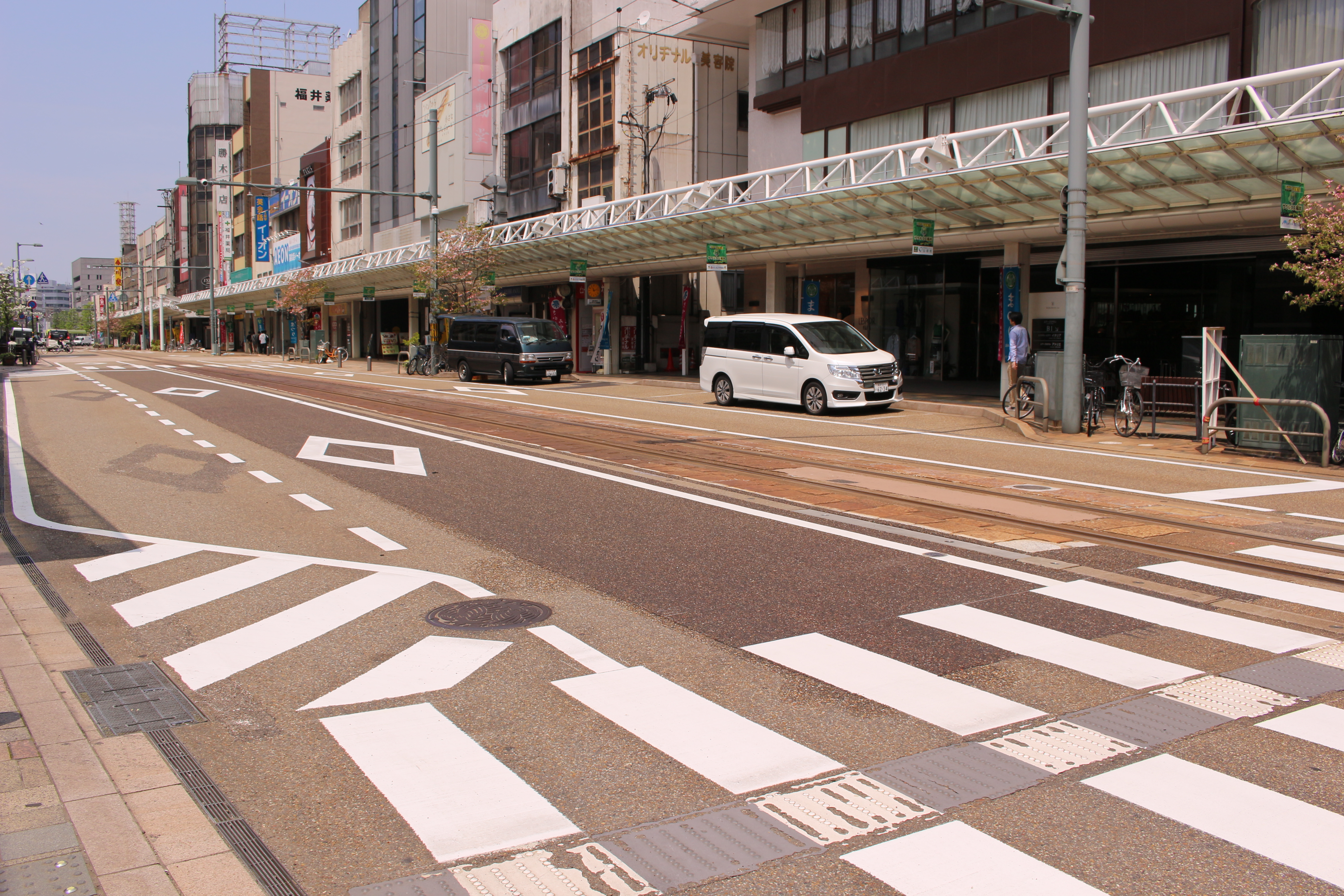
Site of Fukui-Ekimae Station in April 2016

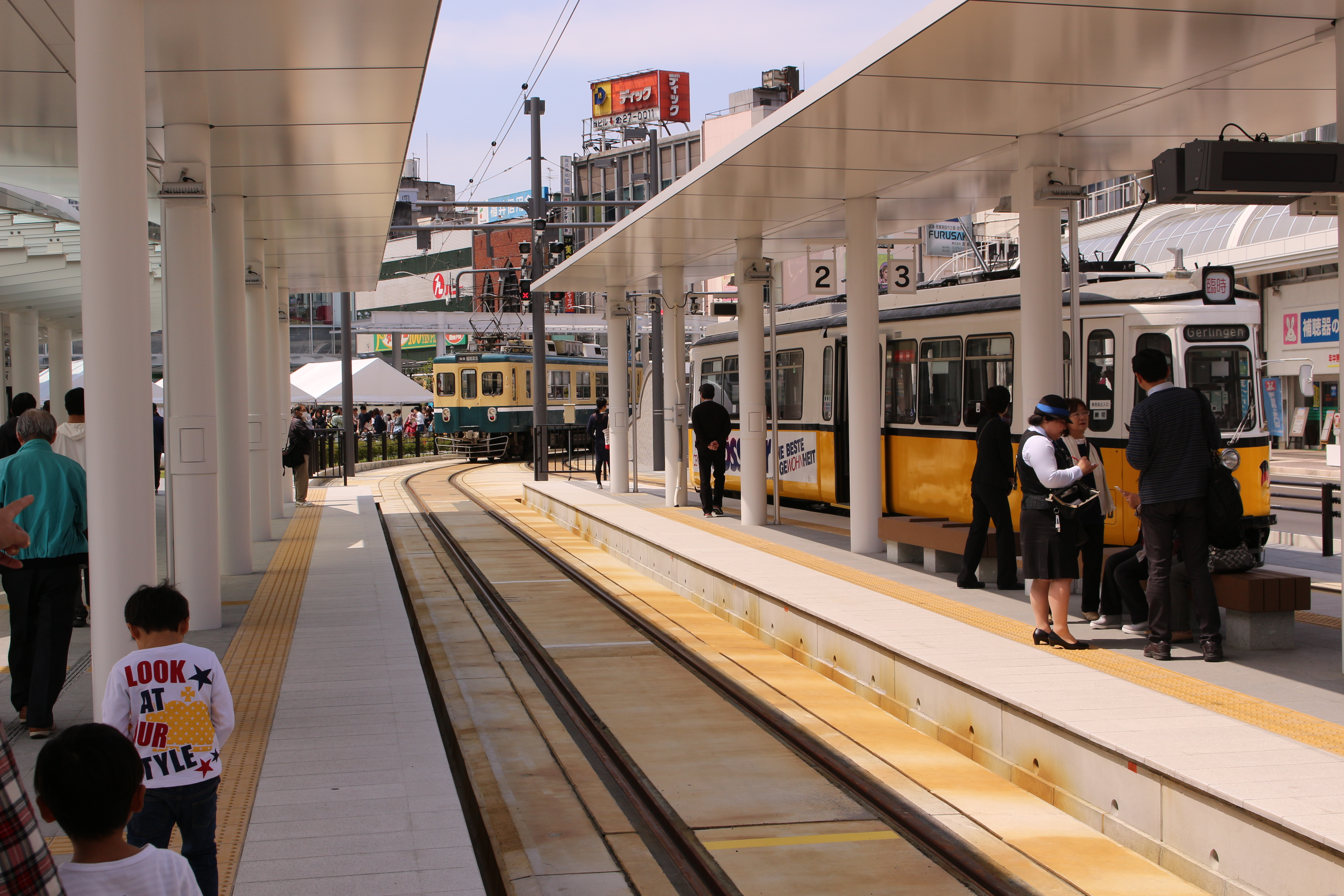
New Fukui-eki Station in April 2016

== Surrounding area ==
=== West exit ===
- Former site of Fukui Castle, now home to the Fukui Prefectural Government Building and Fukui Prefectural Police Department Headquarters
- Fukui City Hall
- NHK Fukui Broadcasting Station
- Fukui Broadcasting Hall
- Fukui International Activities Plaza
- Fukui District Court
- Fukui District Prosecutor's Office
- Fukui Tax Office
- Fukui Chamber of Commerce
- Asuwayama Park

=== East exit ===
- Echizen Railway Fukui Station
- AOSSA building, home to the Fukui Prefectural Civic Hall and Fukui Municipal Sakuragi Library
- Wel City Fukui (Fukui Employee's Pension Hall)
- Fukui Prefectural Koshi High School
- Fukui Municipal Baseball Stadium
- Fukui Local Meteorological Observatory

== See also ==
- List of railway stations in Japan
