= Tawaramachi Station (Fukui) =

Railway station in Fukui, Fukui Prefecture, Japan

Tawaramachi Station 田原町駅
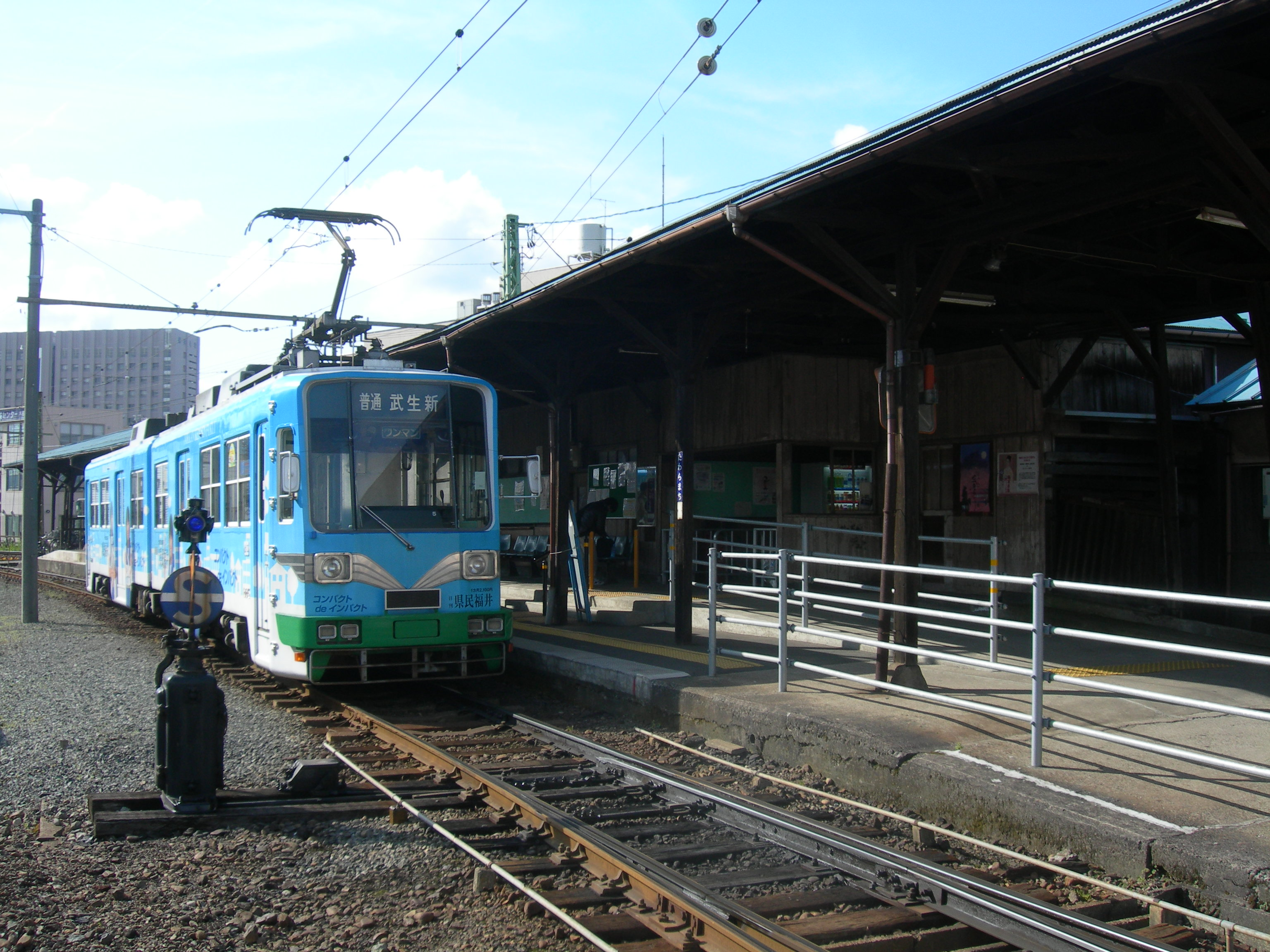
- Tawaramachi Station Fukubu Line platform

General information
- Location: 1-20-7 Tawara, Fukui-shi, Fukui-ken 910-0018; Japan
- Coordinates: 36°04′30″N 136°13′03″E
- Operator: Echizen Railway; Fukui Railway
- Lines: ■ Mikuni Awara Line; ■ Fukubu Line
- Distance: 5.9 km from Fukuiguchi
- Platforms: 1 side + 1 island platform
- Tracks: 3

Other information
- Status: Staffed
- Station code: E26/F24
- Website: Official website

History
- Opened: April 1, 1937
Location
- Location within Japan

Tawaramachi Station (田原町駅, Tawaramachi-eki) is a railway station, located in the city of Fukui, Fukui Prefecture, Japan. Two railway companies, Fukui Railway and Echizen Railway, have operated on the same line at the station since 2016.

== Lines ==
Tawaramachi Station is served by the Mikuni Awara Line, and is located 2.1 kilometers from the terminus of the line at Fukuiguchi. It is also a terminal station of the Fukui Railway Fukubu Line and is 20.9 kilometers from the opposing terminal at Takefu-shin.

== Station layout ==
The station consists of one side platform and one island platform connected by a level crossing. The station is staffed.

=== Platforms ===
1	■ Fukui Railway Fukubu Line	for Takefu-shin
2	■ Mikuni Awara Line	for Washizuka-Haribara and Mikuni-Minato
3	■ Mikuni Awara Line	for Fukui and Katsuyama

== Adjacent stations ==
«	Service	»
Fukui Railway Fukubu Line
Jin'ai Joshikōkō	Express	Fukudaimae-Nishi-Fukui
Jin'ai Joshikōkō Station	Local	Fukudaimae-Nishi-Fukui
Mikuni Awara Line
Nishi-Betsuin	Express	Fukudaimae-Nishi-Fukui
Nishi-Betsuin	Local	Fukudaimae-Nishi-Fukui

== History ==
Tawaramachi Station was opened on April 1, 1937, as a station on the Mikuni Awara Electric Railway. On September 1, 1942, the Keifuku Electric Railway merged with Mikuni Awara Electric Railway. Operations were halted from April 20, 1944. The station reopened on November 27, 1950, and operations were expanded when the station became a terminus of the Fukui Railway Fukubu Line. On June 25, 2001, the Keifuku Electric Railroad portion of the station closed, and reopened again on July 20, 2003, as an Echizen Railway station.

In 2022, Tawaramachi Station opened a mini-library in its multi-purpose waiting area while renovation took place at the city library nearby.

== Surrounding area ==
Tawaramachi Station is just to the west of Phoenix-dōri (Prefectural Route 30). Since the University of Fukui's Bunkyō Campus, Hokuriku High School, Fujishima High School and many other educational institutions are located in the vicinity, students are a common sight in mornings and evenings.

Other points of interest include:

- Fukui Tawaramachi Post Office
- Phoenix Plaza
- Fukui Municipal Gymnasium
- Fukui City Library
- Fukui Fine Arts Museum
- Fukui Prefecture Gokoku Shrine

== See also ==
- List of railway stations in Japan
