= Ōzeki Station (Fukui) =

Railway station in Sakai, Fukui Prefecture, Japan

Ōzeki Station 大関駅
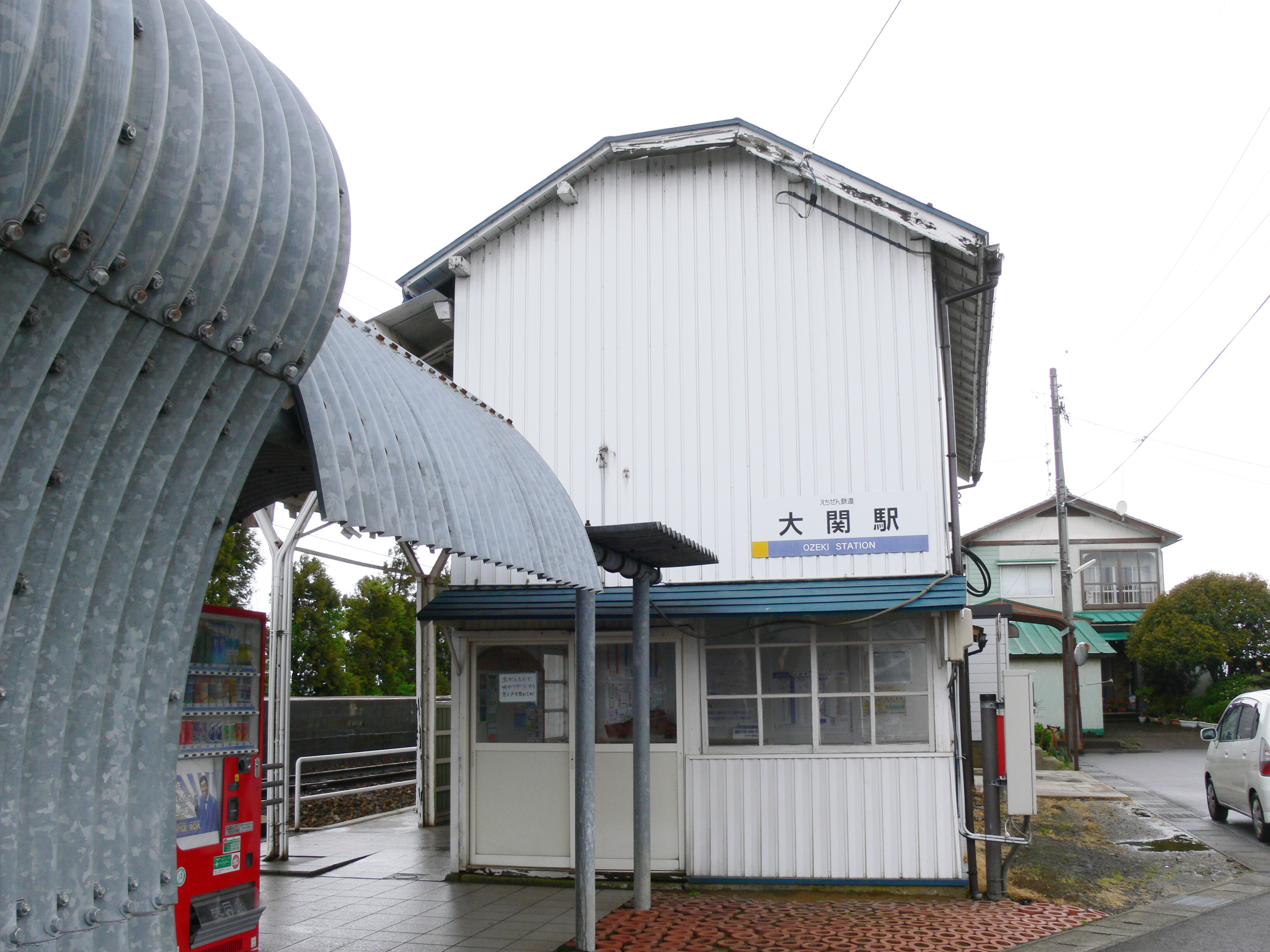
- Ōzeki Station

General information
- Location: 30 Ōmi, Sakai-chō, Sakai-shi, Fuku-ken 919-0547; Japan
- Coordinates: 36°11′12″N 136°12′14″E
- Operator: Echizen Railway
- Line: ■ Mikuni Awara Line
- Distance: 15.4 km from Fukuiguchi
- Platforms: 1 island platform
- Tracks: 1

Other information
- Status: Unstaffed
- Station code: E37
- Website: Official website

History
- Opened: December 30, 1928

Passengers
- FY2015: 81 (daily)
Location
- Location within Japan

Ōzeki Station (大関駅, Ōzeki-eki) is an Echizen Railway Mikuni Awara Line railway station located in the city of Sakai, Fukui Prefecture, Japan.

== Lines ==
Ōzeki Station is served by the Mikuni Awara Line, and is located 15.4 kilometers from the terminus of the line at Fukuiguchi.

== Station layout ==
The station consists of one island platform connected to the station building by a level crossing. The station is unattended. A piece of public art doubles as a roofed walkway between the station and a nearby parking lot.

== Adjacent stations ==
«	Service	»
Mikuni Awara Line
Express: Does not stop at this station
Shimohyogo Kofuku	Local	Honjō

== History ==
Ōzeki Station was opened on December 30, 1928. On September 1, 1942, the Keifuku Electric Railway merged with Mikuni Awara Electric Railway. Operations were halted from June 25, 2001. The station reopened on August 10, 2003, as an Echizen Railway station.

== Passenger statistics ==
In fiscal 2015, the station was used by an average of 81 passengers daily (boarding passengers only).

== Surrounding area ==
- The station is surrounded by residences and fields. Fukui Prefectural Route 154 lies to the south.
- Other points of interest include:
  - Fukui / Ishikawa Prefectural Route 5 (Awara Kaidō)
  - Ricoh Japan Fukui Plant
  - Ōzeki Post Office

== See also ==
- List of railway stations in Japan
