= Mikuni Station (Fukui) =

Railway station in Sakai, Fukui Prefecture, Japan

Mikuni Station 三国駅
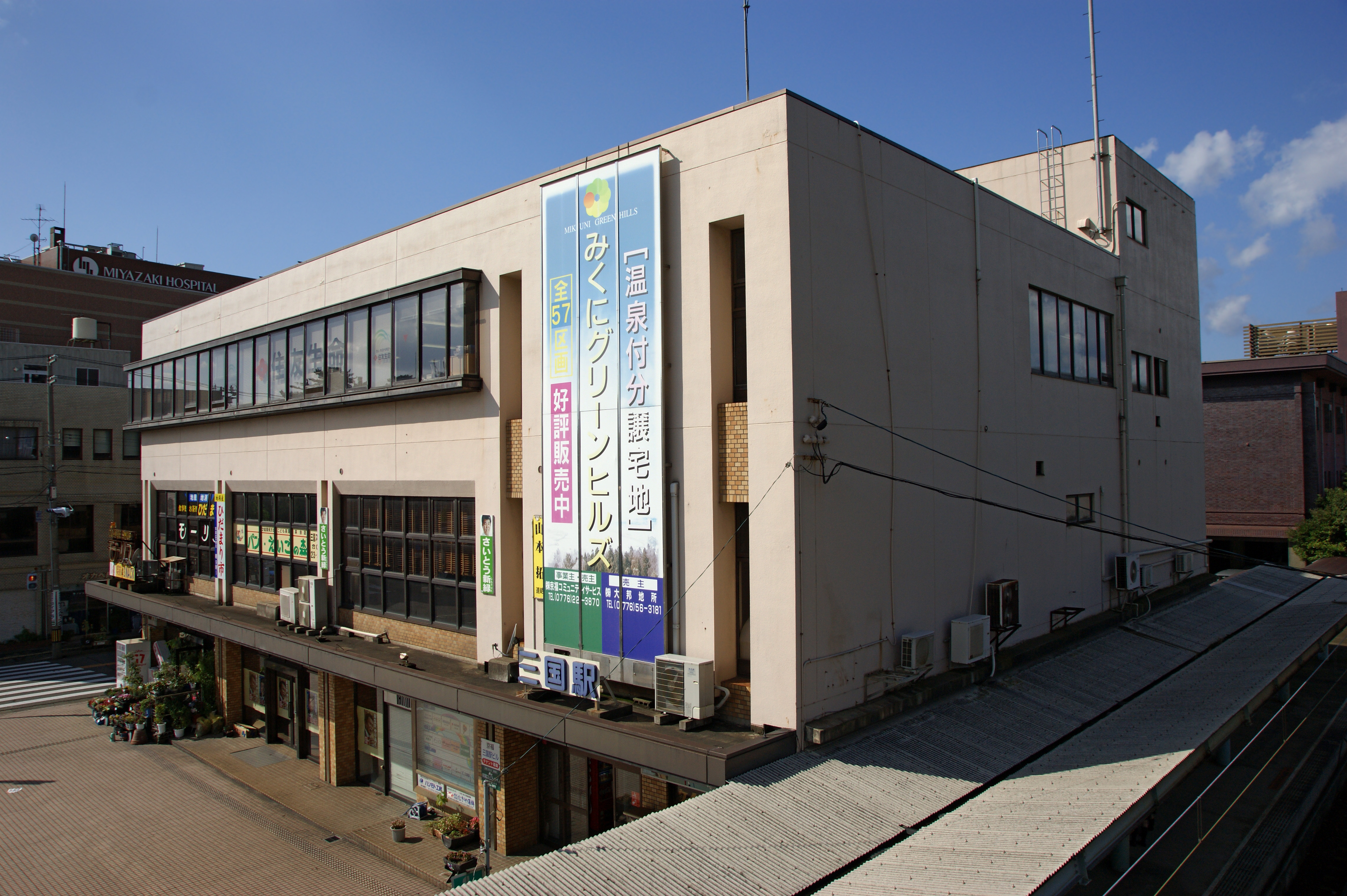
- Mikuni Station entrance

General information
- Location: 2-1-20 Kitahonmachi, Mikuni-chō, Sakai-shi, Fukui-ken 913-0046; Japan
- Coordinates: 36°13′01″N 136°08′58″E
- Operator: Echizen Railway
- Line: ■ Mikuni Awara Line
- Distance: 24.2 km from Fukuiguchi
- Platforms: 1 side platform
- Tracks: 1

Other information
- Status: Staffed
- Station code: E43
- Website: Official website

History
- Opened: December 15, 1911

Passengers
- FY2015: 415 (daily)
Location
- Location within Japan

Mikuni Station (三国駅, Mikuni-eki) is an Echizen Railway Mikuni Awara Line railway station located in the city of Sakai, Fukui Prefecture, Japan.

== Lines ==
Mikuni Station is served by the Mikuni Awara Line, and is located 24.2 kilometers from the terminus of the line at Fukuiguchi.

== Station layout ==
The station consists of one side platform serving a single bi-directional track, with a three-story station building. The station is staffed.

== Adjacent stations ==
«	Service	»
Mikuni Awara Line
Awara-Yunomachi	Express	Mikuni-Minato
Mikuni-Jinjya	Local	Mikuni-Minato

== History ==
Mikuni Station was opened on December 15, 1911 as a station on the Japanese Government Railways Mikuni Line. On January 31, 1929 the Mikuni Awara Electric Railway Mikunichō Station opened adjacent to Mikuni Station. Mikunichō Station was renamed Densha-Mikuni Station on February 10, 1929. On September 1, 1942 the Keifuku Electric Railway merged with Mikuni Awara Electric Railway. Operations were halted on the Mikuni Line from October 11, 1944 and Densha-Mikuni Station moved to JGR Mikuni Station and Keifuku took over the operations of former JGR line between Mikuni and Mikuni-Minato. The Mikuni Line officially closed on March 1, 1972, and the Echizen Main Line from June 25, 2001. The station reopened on August 10, 2003 under its present name as an Echizen Railway station.

== Passenger statistics ==
In fiscal 2015, the station was used by an average of 415 passengers daily (boarding passengers only).

== Surrounding area ==
- The station opens onto a rotary with a small Keifuku bus terminal and taxi stand
- Behind the station are steep hills; pedestrians can cross to the front entrance via a bridge, but automobile traffic must make a detour.
- Other points of interest include:
  - Mikuni Ryushokan Museum
  - Mikuni Bunka Miraikan
  - Sakai Municipal Mikuni-Kita Elementary School
  - Fukui Prefectural Mikuni Senior High School

== See also ==
- List of railway stations in Japan
