= Shimohyogo Kofuku Station =

Railway station in Sakai, Fukui Prefecture, Japan

Shimohyogo Kofuku Station 下兵庫こうふく駅
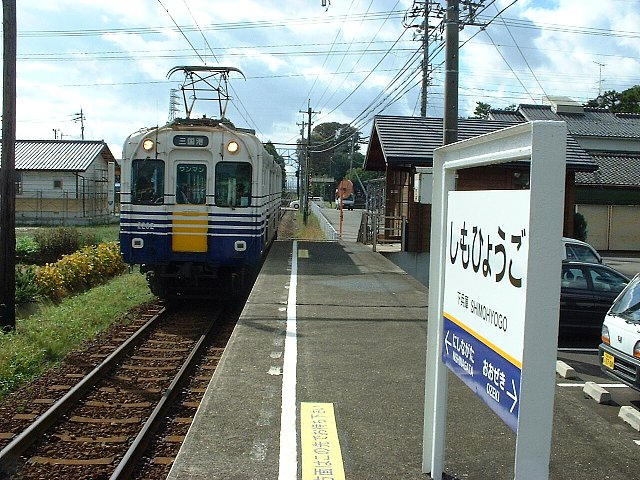
- Shimohyōgo Station platform

General information
- Location: 87 Shimo-Hyōgo, Sakai-chō, Sakai-shi, Fukui-ken 919-0527; Japan
- Coordinates: 36°10′11″N 136°12′09″E
- Operator: Echizen Railway
- Line: ■ Mikuni Awara Line
- Distance: 13.6 km from Fukuiguchi
- Platforms: 1 side platform
- Tracks: 1

Other information
- Status: Unstaffed
- Station code: E36
- Website: Official website

History
- Opened: December 30, 1928
- Former names: Shimo-Hyōgo (until 2017)

Passengers
- FY2015: 72 (daily)
Location
- Location within Japan

Shimohyogo Kofuku Station (下兵庫こうふく駅, Shimohyōgo Kōfuku-eki) is an Echizen Railway Mikuni Awara Line railway station located in the city of Sakai, Fukui Prefecture, Japan.

== Lines ==
Shimohyōgo-Kōfuku Station is served by the Mikuni Awara Line, and is located 13.6 kilometers from the terminus of the line at Fukuiguchi.

== Station layout ==
The station consists of one side platform serving a single bi-directional track. The station is unattended.

== Adjacent stations ==
«	Service	»
Mikuni Awara Line
Express: Does not stop at this station
Nishinagata Yurinosato	Local	Ōzeki

== History ==
Shimohyogo Kofuku Station was opened on December 30, 1928 as Shimohyogo Station (下兵庫駅, Shimohyōgo-eki). On September 1, 1942 the Keifuku Electric Railway merged with Mikuni Awara Electric Railway. Operations were halted from June 25, 2001. The station reopened on August 10, 2003 as an Echizen Railway station. On March 25, 2017 the station was renamed as Shimohyogo Kofuku Station.

== Passenger statistics ==
In fiscal 2015, the station was used by an average of 72 passengers daily (boarding passengers only).

== Surrounding area ==
- The station is surrounded by residences and fields. Fukui Prefectural Route 102 lies to the south.
- Sakai City Shimo-Hyōgo Elementary School

== See also ==
- List of railway stations in Japan
