= Mizui Station =

Railway station in Sakai, Fukui Prefecture, Japan

Mizui Station 水居駅
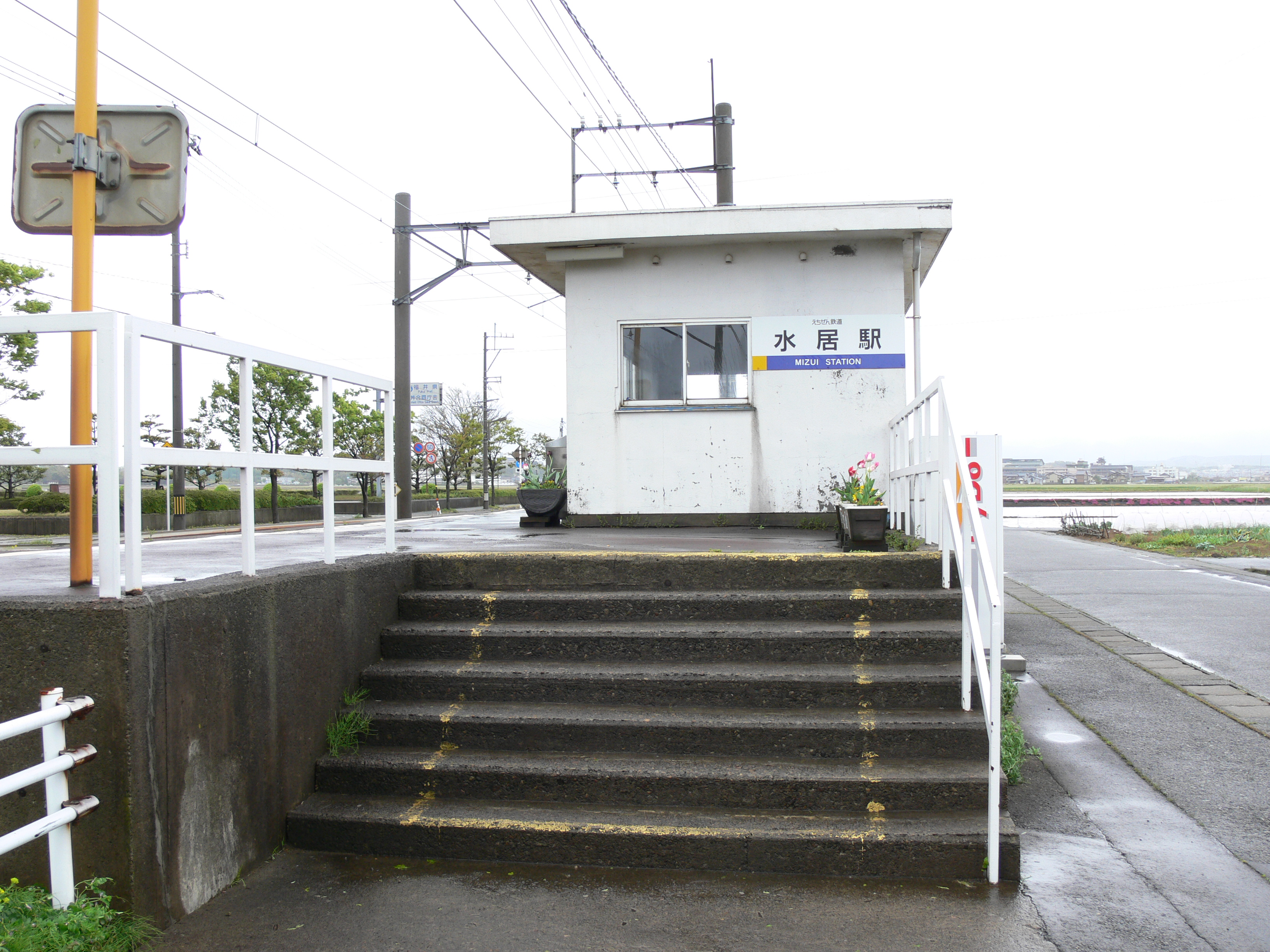
- Mizui Station

General information
- Location: 23 Mizui, Mikuni-chō, Sakai-shi, Fukui-ken 913-0011; Japan
- Coordinates: 36°13′09″N 136°10′19″E
- Operator: Echizen Railway
- Line: ■ Mikuni Awara Line
- Distance: 22.0 km from Fukuiguchi
- Platforms: 1 side platform
- Tracks: 1

Other information
- Status: Unstaffed
- Station code: E41
- Website: Official website

History
- Opened: January 30, 1929

Passengers
- FY2015: 32 (daily)
Location
- Location within Japan

Mizui Station (水居駅, Mizui-eki) is an Echizen Railway Mikuni Awara Line railway station located in the city of Sakai, Fukui Prefecture, Japan.

== Lines ==
Mizui Station is served by the Mikuni Awara Line, and is located 22.0 kilometers from the terminus of the line at Fukuiguchi.

== Station layout ==
The station consists of one side platform serving a single bi-directional track. There is no station building, but only a shelter on the platform. The station is unstaffed.

== Adjacent stations ==
«	Service	»
Mikuni Awara Line
Express: Does not stop at this station
Awara-Yunomachi	Local	Mikuni-Jinja

== History ==
Mizui Station was opened on January 30, 1929. On September 1, 1942 the Keifuku Electric Railway merged with Mikuni Awara Electric Railway. Operations were halted from June 25, 2001. The station reopened on August 10, 2003 as an Echizen Railway station.

== Passenger statistics ==
In fiscal 2015, the station was used by an average of 32 passengers daily (boarding passengers only).

== Surrounding area ==
- The station's south side is mostly residential, while the north side is composed mainly of fields.
- Fukui Prefecture Sakai Government Building is just to the north of the station

== See also ==
- List of railway stations in Japan
