= Taromaru Angelland Station =

Railway station in Sakai, Fukui Prefecture, Japan

Taromaru Angelland Station 太郎丸エンゼルランド駅
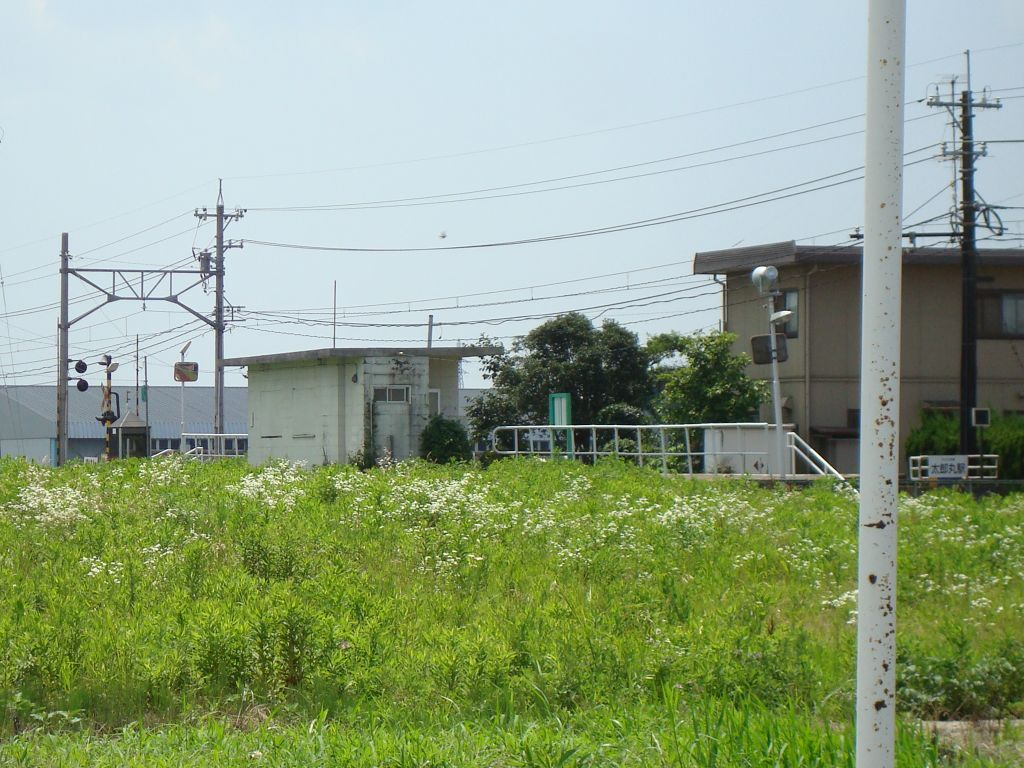
- Tarōmaru Station

General information
- Location: 4 Nishi-Tarōmaru, Harue-chō, Sakai-shi, Fukui-ken 919-0474; Japan
- Coordinates: 36°07′53″N 136°12′21″E
- Operator: Echizen Railway
- Line: ■ Mikuni Awara Line
- Distance: 9.2 km from Fukuiguchi
- Platforms: 1 side platform
- Tracks: 1

Other information
- Status: Unstaffed
- Station code: E33
- Website: Official website

History
- Opened: December 30, 1928
- Former names: Tarōmaru (until 2017)

Passengers
- FY2015: 132 (daily)
Location
- Location within Japan

Taromaru Angelland Station (太郎丸エンゼルランド駅, Tarōmaru-Enzerurando-eki) is an Echizen Railway Mikuni Awara Line railway station located in the city of Sakai, Fukui Prefecture, Japan.

== Lines ==
Taromaru Angelland Station is served by the Mikuni Awara Line, and is located 9.2 kilometers from the terminus of the line at Fukuiguchi.

== Station layout ==
The station consists of one side platform serving a single bi-directional track. The station is unattended.

== Adjacent stations ==
«	Service	»
Mikuni Awara Line
Express: Does not stop at this station
Washizuka-Haribara	Local	Nishiharue Heartopia

== History ==
Taromaru Angelland Station was opened on December 30, 1928. On September 1, 1942 the Keifuku Electric Railway merged with Mikuni Awara Electric Railway. Operations were halted from June 25, 2001. The station reopened on August 10, 2003 as an Echizen Railway station. The station was renamed to its present name on March 25, 2017.

== Passenger statistics ==
In fiscal 2015, the station was used by an average of 132 passengers daily (boarding passengers only).

== Surrounding area ==
- Newly built residences lie to the east of the station, while rice fields and a park-and-ride lot are to the west.
- JR West Harue Station is approximately two kilometers east of the station.
- Other points of interest include:
  - Fukui Prefecture Drivers Education Center (Testing Center)
  - Sakai City Bunka-no-Mori cultural facility
    - Heartpia Harue (Sakai City Harue Library, meeting halls)
    - Communication Park
    - Fukui Prefecture Children's Science Museum (Engelland Fukui)

== See also ==
- List of railway stations in Japan
