= Nikkakagaku-Mae Station =

Railway station in Fukui, Fukui Prefecture, Japan

Nikkakagaku-mae Station 日華化学前駅
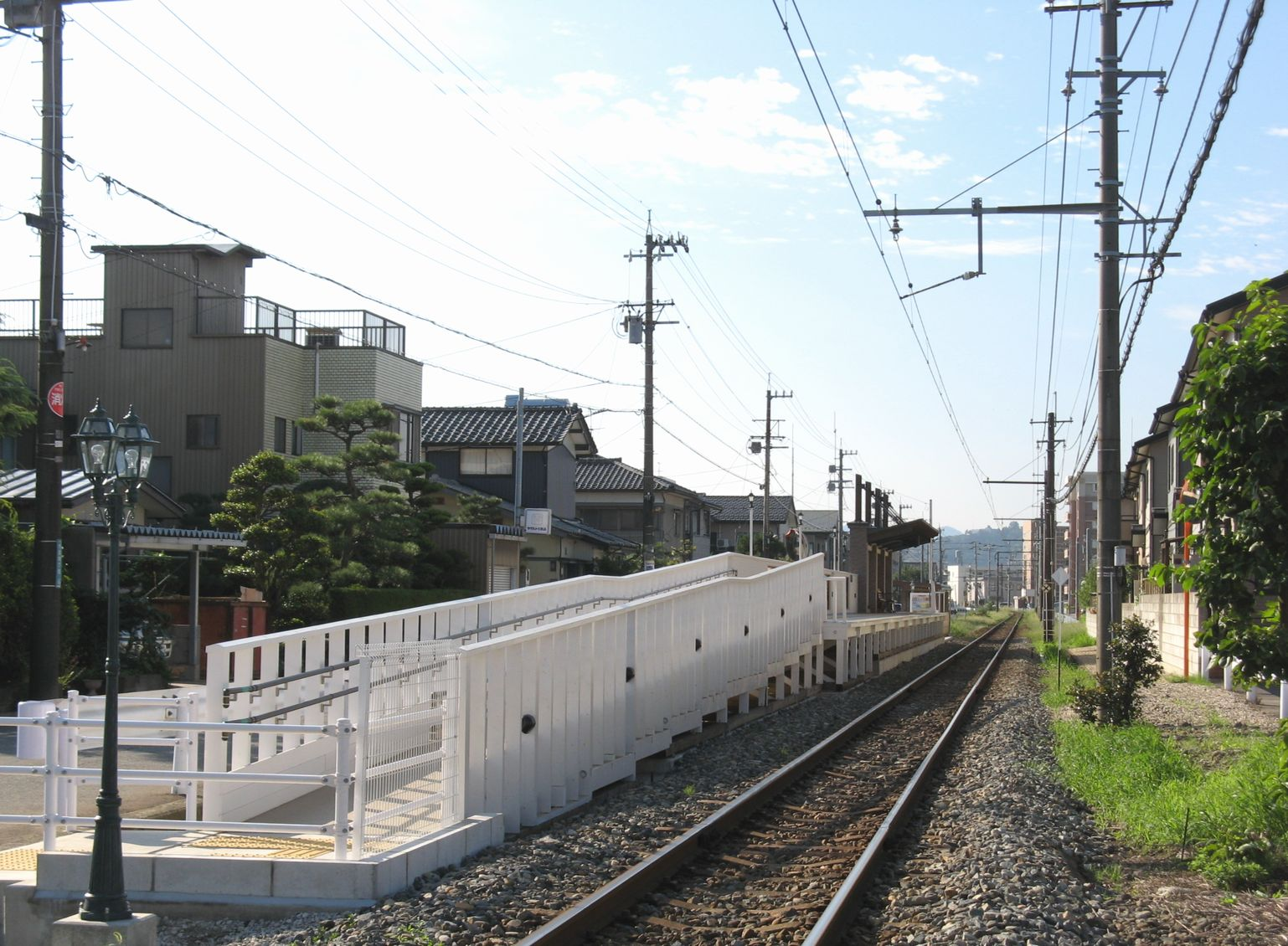
- Nikkakagaku-mae Station

General information
- Location: 5-8 Ōmiya, Fukui-shi, Fukui-ken 910-0016; Japan
- Coordinates: 36°04′51″N 136°12′24″E
- Operator: Echizen Railway
- Line: ■ Mikuni Awara Line
- Distance: 3.6 km from Fukuiguchi
- Platforms: 1 side platform
- Tracks: 1

Other information
- Status: Unstaffed
- Station code: E28
- Website: Official website

History
- Opened: September 1, 2007
Location
- Location within Japan

Nikkakagaku-mae Station (日華化学前駅, Nikkakagaku-mae-eki) is an Echizen Railway Mikuni Awara Line railway station located in the city of Fukui, Fukui Prefecture, Japan. The station's name was chosen by employees of Nicca Chemical, which obtained 10-year naming rights to the station for six million yen.

== Lines ==
Nikkakagaku-mae Station is served by the Mikuni Awara Line, and is located 3.6 kilometers from the terminus of the line at Fukuiguchi.

== Station layout ==
The station consists of one side platformserving a single bi-directional track. The station is unattended. There is a small variable message sign on the platform that warns passengers about incoming trains. It flashes "電車がきます”, or, "the train is coming" to the tune of Mary Had a Little Lamb.

== Adjacent stations ==
«	Service	»
Mikuni Awara Line
Express: Does not stop at this station
Fukudaimae-Nishi-Fukui	Local	Yatsushima

== History ==
Nikkakagaku-Mae Station was opened on September 1, 2007.

== Surrounding area ==
- The area is mostly residential. The headquarters and main research facilities of Nicca Chemical are located just to the west of the station.
- Other points of interest include:
  - University of Fukui (North Gate)
  - Fukui Bunkyō Post Office
  - National Route 416 (Fujishima-dōri)
  - Fukui - Ishikawa Prefectural Route 5 (Awara Kaidō)

== See also ==
- List of railway stations in Japan
