= Honjō Station (Fukui) =

Railway station in Awara, Fukui Prefecture, Japan

Honjō Station 本荘駅
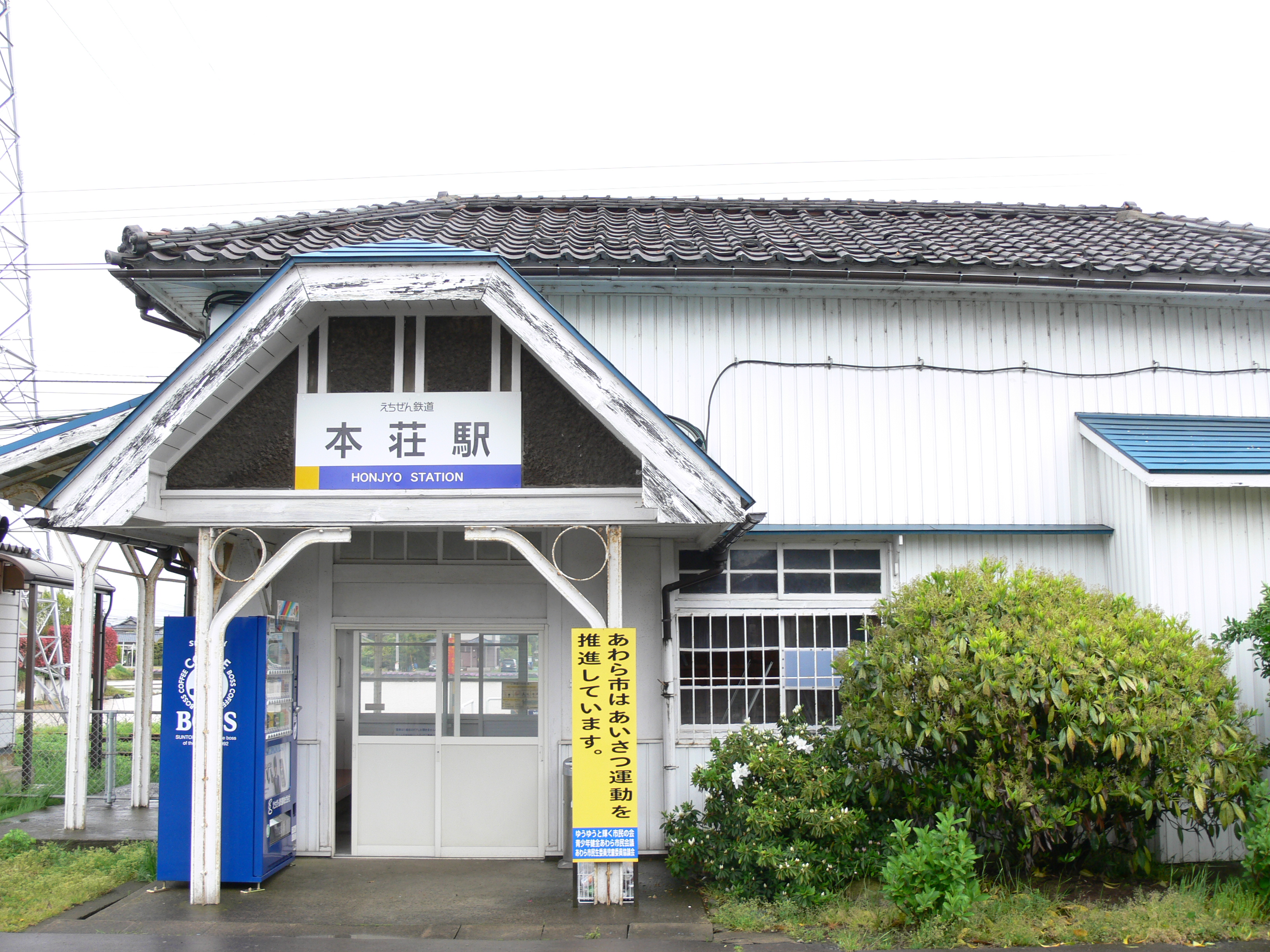
- Honjō Station

General information
- Location: 15 Nakaban, Awara-shi, Fukui-ken 910-4137; Japan
- Coordinates: 36°12′18″N 136°12′11″E
- Operator: Echizen Railway
- Line: ■ Mikuni Awara Line
- Distance: 17.4 km from Fukuiguchi
- Platforms: 1 island platform
- Tracks: 2

Other information
- Status: Unstaffed
- Station code: E38
- Website: Official website

History
- Opened: December 30, 1928
Location
- Location within Japan

Honjō Station (本荘駅, Honjō-eki) is an Echizen Railway Mikuni Awara Line railway station located in the city of Awara, Fukui Prefecture, Japan.

== Lines ==
Honjō Station is served by the Mikuni Awara Line, and is located 17.4 kilometers from the terminus of the line at Fukuiguchi.

== Station layout ==
The station consists of one unnumbered island platforms connected to the station building by a level crossing. The station is unstaffed. The wooden station building is protected by the government as a Registered Tangible Cultural Property.

== Adjacent stations ==
«	Service	»
Mikuni Awara Line
Ōzeki	Express	Awara-Yunomachi
Ōzeki	Local	Banden

== History ==
Honjō Station was opened on December 30, 1928. On September 1, 1942, the Keifuku Electric Railway merged with Mikuni Awara Electric Railway. Operations were halted from June 25, 2001. The station reopened on August 10, 2003, as an Echizen Railway station.

== Surrounding area ==
- The station is surrounded by residences; further away lie fields spotted by grain elevators. Fukui Prefectural Route 101 lies to the north.
- Other points of interest include:
  - Awara City Honjō Elementary School
  - Nakaban Community Center

== See also ==
- List of railway stations in Japan
