= Nishibetsuin Station =

Railway station in Fukui, Fukui Prefecture, Japan

Nishibetsuin Station 西別院駅
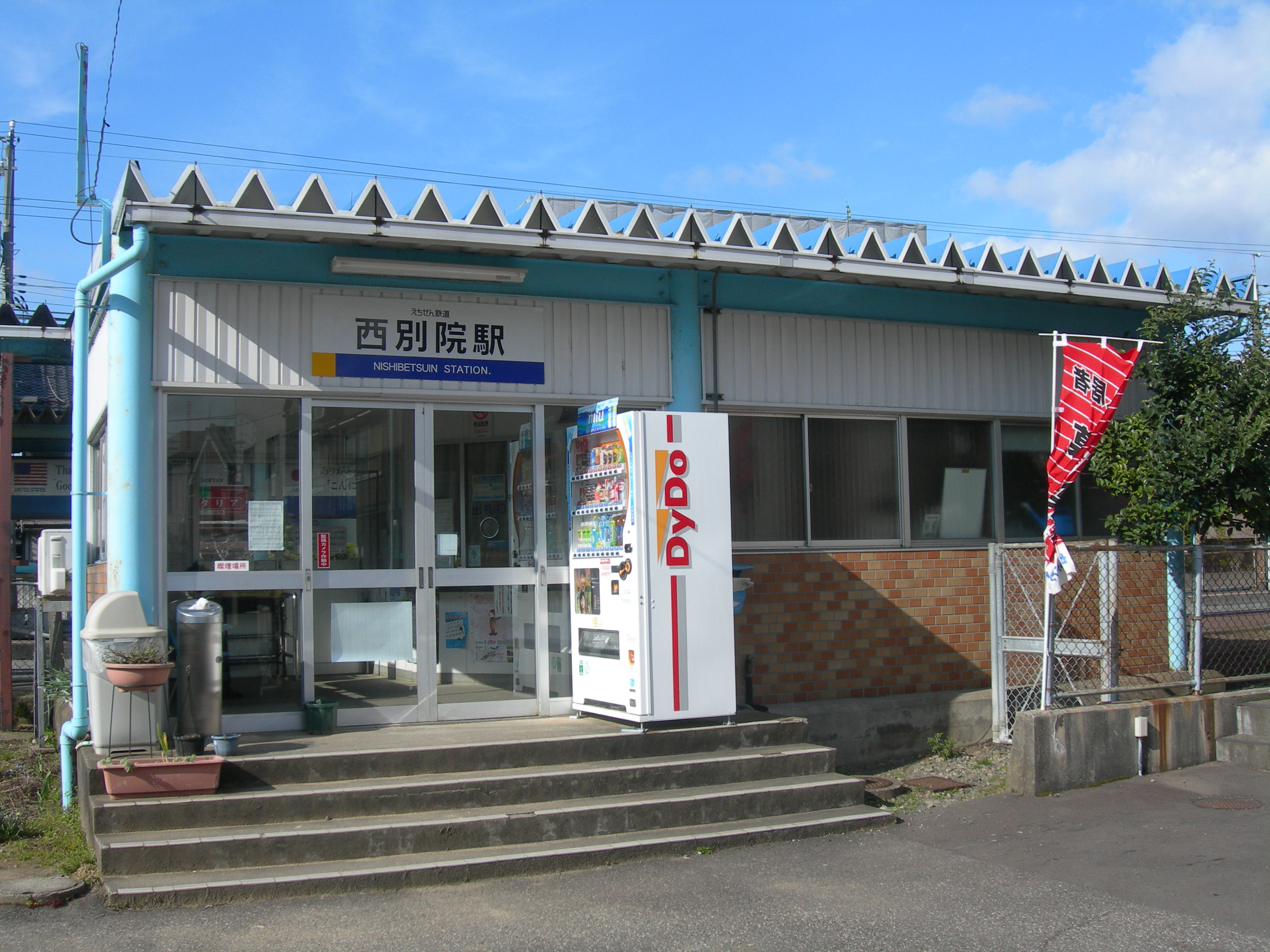
- Nishbetsuin Station in March 2009

General information
- Location: 3 Matsumoto, Fukui-shi, Fukui-ken 910-0003; Japan
- Coordinates: 36°04′31″N 136°13′22″E
- Distance: 1.6 km from Fukuiguchi
- Platforms: 2 side platforms
- Tracks: 2

Other information
- Status: Unstaffed
- Station code: E25
- Website: Official website

History
- Opened: April 1, 1929
Location
- Location within Japan

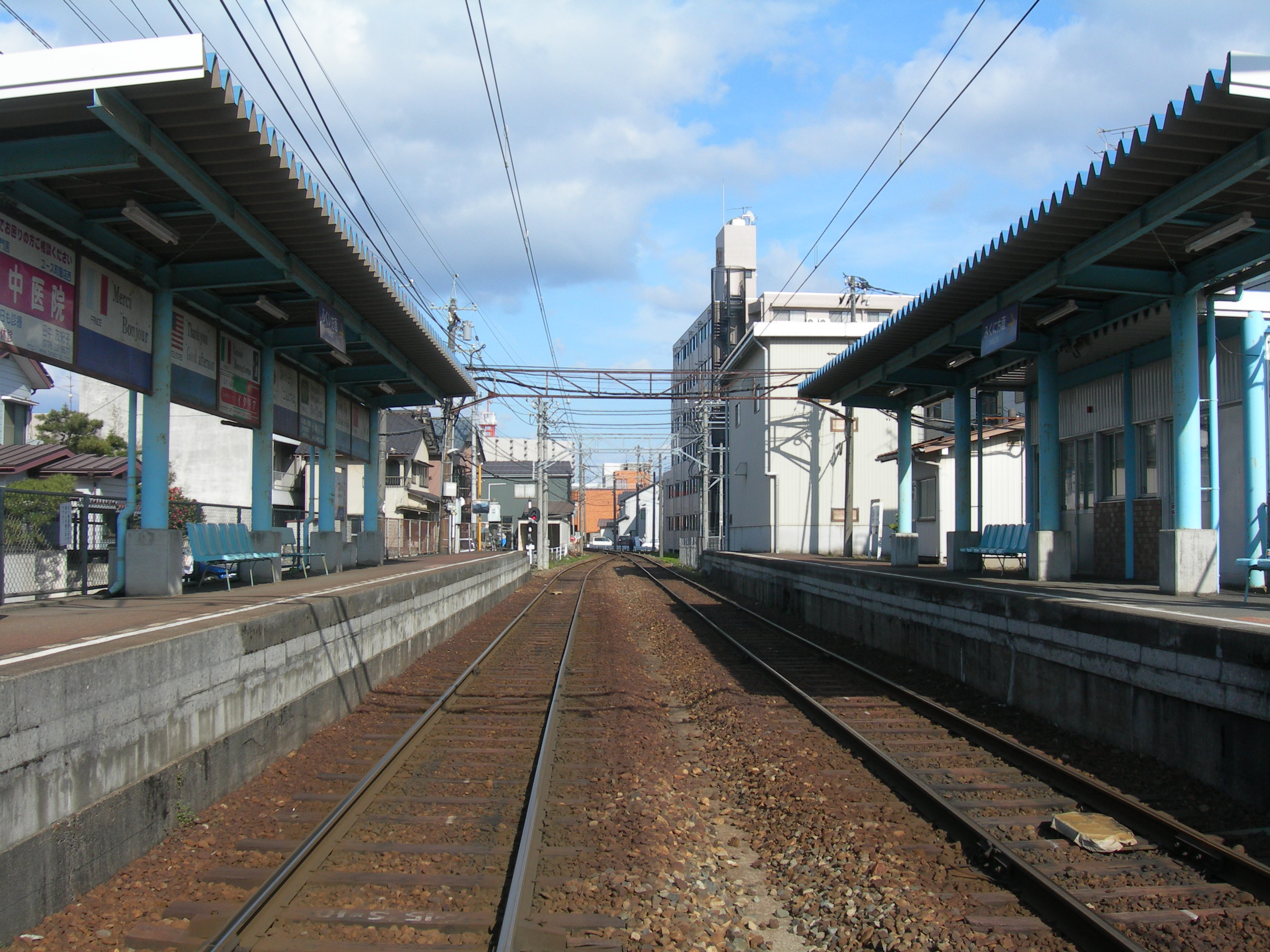
platforms

Nishibetsuin Station (西別院駅, Nishibetsuin-eki) is an Echizen Railway Mikuni Awara Line railway station located in the city of Fukui, Fukui Prefecture, Japan.

== Lines ==
Nishibetsuin Station is served by the Mikuni Awara Line, and is located 1.6 kilometers from the terminus of the line at Fukuiguchi.

== Station layout ==
The station consists of two opposed side platforms connected by a level crossing. The station is unattended.

== Adjacent stations ==
«	Service	»
Mikuni Awara Line
Express: Does not stop at this station
Matsumoto Machiya	Local	Tawaramachi

== History ==
Nishibetsuin Station was opened on April 1, 1929. On September 1, 1942 the Keifuku Electric Railway merged with Mikuni Awara Electric Railway. Operations were halted from June 25, 2001. The station reopened on August 10, 2003 as an Echizen Railway station.

== Surrounding area ==
- The area is primarily residential, with high-rise apartment buildings and homes lining the streets.
- The name of the station refers to the nearby Nishi Honganji Temple, Fukui Branch, which has betsuin status.
- Other points of interest include:
  - Japan Self-Defense Force Fukui Provincial Cooperation Office
  - Fukui Prefecture governmental building (agricultural and tax offices)
  - Fukuiken Shokuinkaikan
  - Fukui City Fire Department Naka Fire Station

== See also ==
- List of railway stations in Japan
