= Mikuni-Jinjya Station =

Railway station in Sakai, Fukui Prefecture, Japan

Mikuni-Jinjya Station 三国神社駅
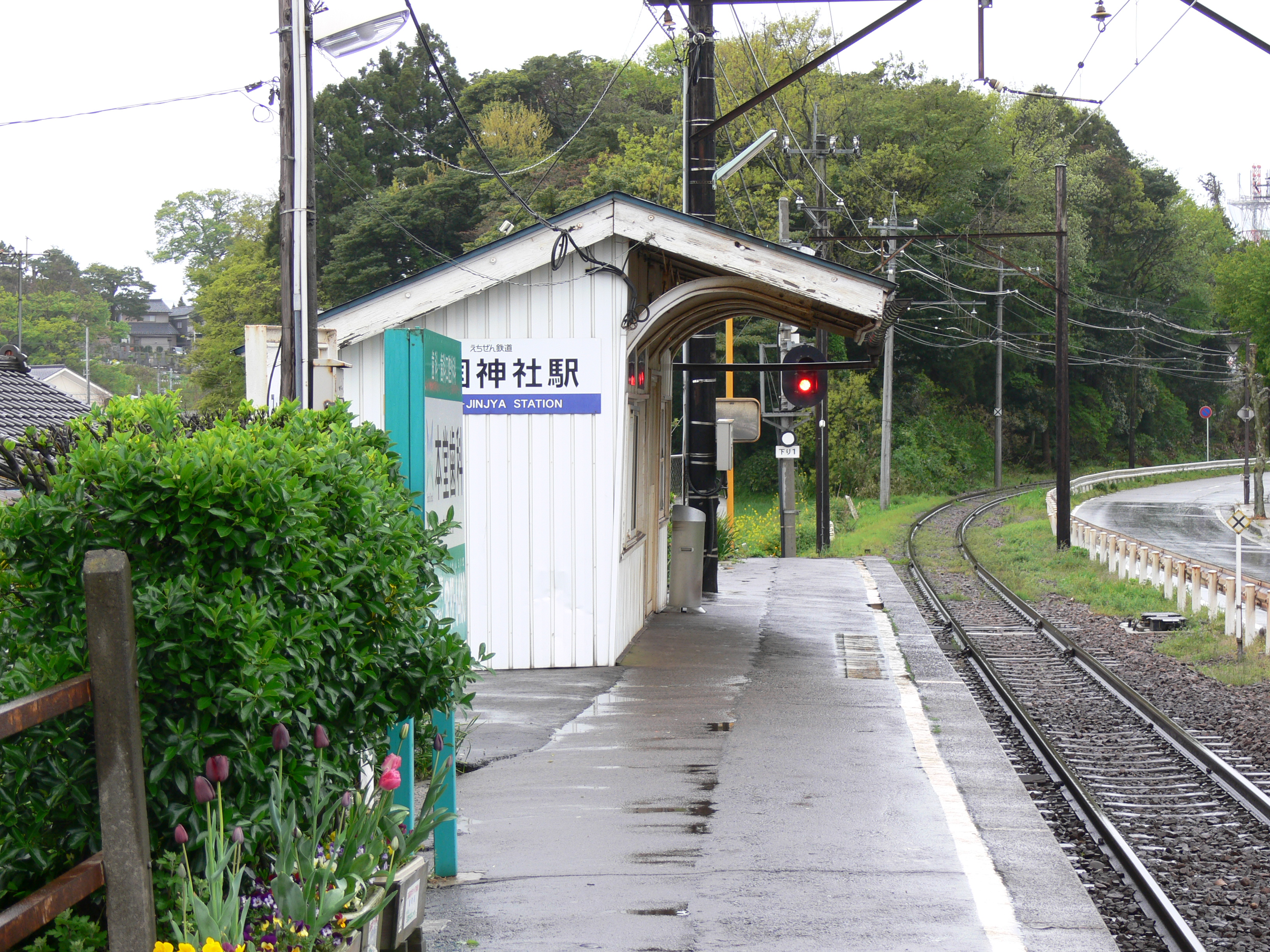
- Mikuni-Jinjya Station

General information
- Location: 7-2-3 Mikuni-Higashi, Mikuni-chō, Sakai-shi, Fukui-ken 913-0016; Japan
- Coordinates: 36°12′53″N 136°09′29″E
- Operator: Echizen Railway
- Line: ■ Mikuni Awara Line
- Distance: 23.4 km from Fukuiguchi
- Platforms: 1 side platform
- Tracks: 1

Other information
- Status: Unstaffed
- Station code: E42
- Website: Official website

History
- Opened: July 1, 1930

Passengers
- FY2015: 72 (daily)
Location
- Location within Japan

Mikuni-Jinjya Station (三国神社駅, Mikuni-Jinja-eki) is an Echizen Railway Mikuni Awara Line railway station located in the city of Sakai, Fukui Prefecture, Japan.

== Lines ==
Mikuni-Jinjya Station is served by the Mikuni Awara Line, and is located 23.4 kilometers from the terminus of the line at Fukuiguchi.

== Station layout ==
The station consists of one side platform serving a single bi-directional track. There is no station building, but only a shelter on the platform. The station is unstaffed.

== Adjacent stations ==
«	Service	»
Mikuni Awara Line
Express: Does not stop at this station
Mizui	Local	Mikuni

== History ==
Mikuni-Jinjya Station was opened on July 1, 1930. On September 1, 1942, the Keifuku Electric Railway merged with Mikuni Awara Electric Railway. Operations were halted from June 25, 2001. The station reopened on August 10, 2003, as an Echizen Railway station.

== Surrounding area ==
- Central Mikuni stretches from this station to Mikuni-Minato Station. However, most government facilities are clustered around this station. These include:
  - Kanazawa Regional Taxation Bureau, Mikuni Tax Office
  - Sakai City Hall, Mikuni Branch Office
  - Reihoku Fire Department, Reihoku Mikuni Fire Station
  - Fukui Prefectural Police, Sakai West Police Station
- Other points of interest include:
  - Sakai Municipal Mikuni Hospital
  - Sakai City Mikuni Junior High School
  - Sakai City Mikuni South Elementary School
  - Mikuni Gymnasium

== Passenger statistics ==
In fiscal 2015, the station was used by an average of 72 passengers daily (boarding passengers only).

== See also ==
- List of railway stations in Japan
