= Nishiharue Heartopia Station =

Railway station in Sakai, Fukui Prefecture, Japan

Nishiharue Heartopia Station 西春江ハートピア駅
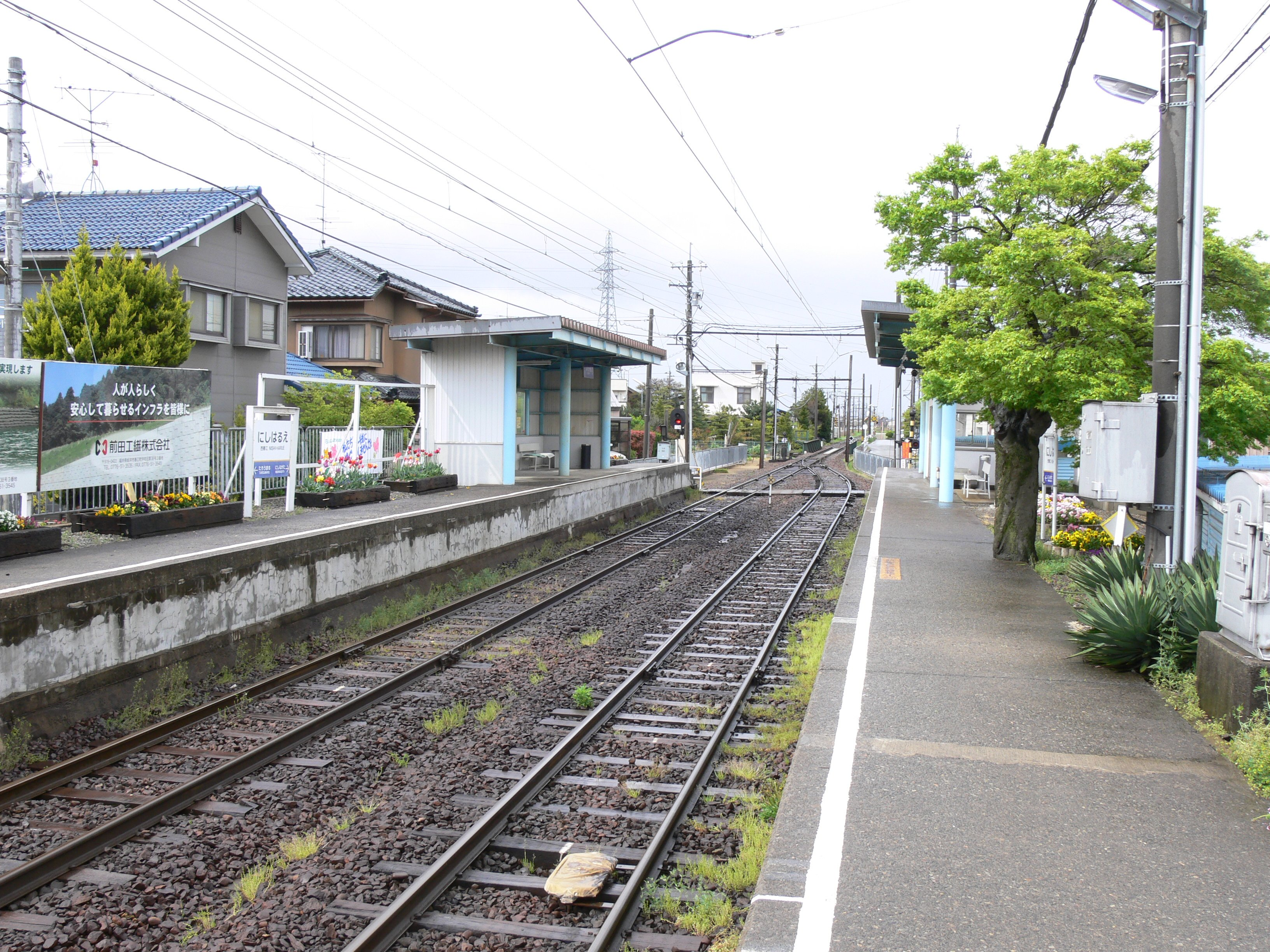
- Nishi-Harue Station

General information
- Location: 16 Hondō, Harue-chō, Sakai-shi, Fukui-ken 919-0473; Japan
- Coordinates: 36°08′21″N 136°12′23″E
- Operator: Echizen Railway
- Line: ■ Mikuni Awara Line
- Distance: 15.4 km from Fukuiguchi
- Platforms: 2 side platforms
- Tracks: 2

Other information
- Status: Unstaffed
- Station code: E34
- Website: Official website

History
- Opened: December 30, 1928
- Former names: Nishi-Harue (until 2017)

Passengers
- FY2015: 135 (daily)
Location
- Location within Japan

Nishiharue Heartopia Station (西春江ハートピア駅, Nishiharue-Hātopia-eki) is an Echizen Railway Mikuni Awara Line railway station located in the city of Sakai, Fukui Prefecture, Japan.

== Lines ==
Ōzeki Station is served by the Mikuni Awara Line, and is located 10.1 kilometers from the terminus of the line at Fukuiguchi.

== Station layout ==
The station consists of two side platforms connected to the station building by a level crossing. The station is unattended.

== Adjacent stations ==
«	Service	»
Mikuni Awara Line
Express: Does not stop at this station
Taromaru Angelland	Local	Nishinagata Yurinosato

== History ==
Nishiharue Heartopia Station was opened on December 30, 1928, as Nishiharue Station (西春江駅, Nishiharue-eki). On September 1, 1942, the Keifuku Electric Railway merged with Mikuni Awara Electric Railway. Operations were halted from June 25, 2001. The station reopened on August 10, 2003, as an Echizen Railway station. The station was renamed to its present name on March 25, 2017.

== Passenger statistics ==
In fiscal 2015, the station was used by an average of 135 passengers daily (boarding passengers only).

== Surrounding area ==
- The station is at the center of a small cluster of residences and shops. Fukui Prefectural Route 102 lies to the south.
- The general-aviation Fukui Airport is located roughly 1.5 kilometers east.

== See also ==
- List of railway stations in Japan
