= Fukudaimae-Nishi-Fukui Station =

Railway station in Fukui, Fukui Prefecture, Japan

Fukudaimae-Nishi-Fukui Station 福大前西福井駅
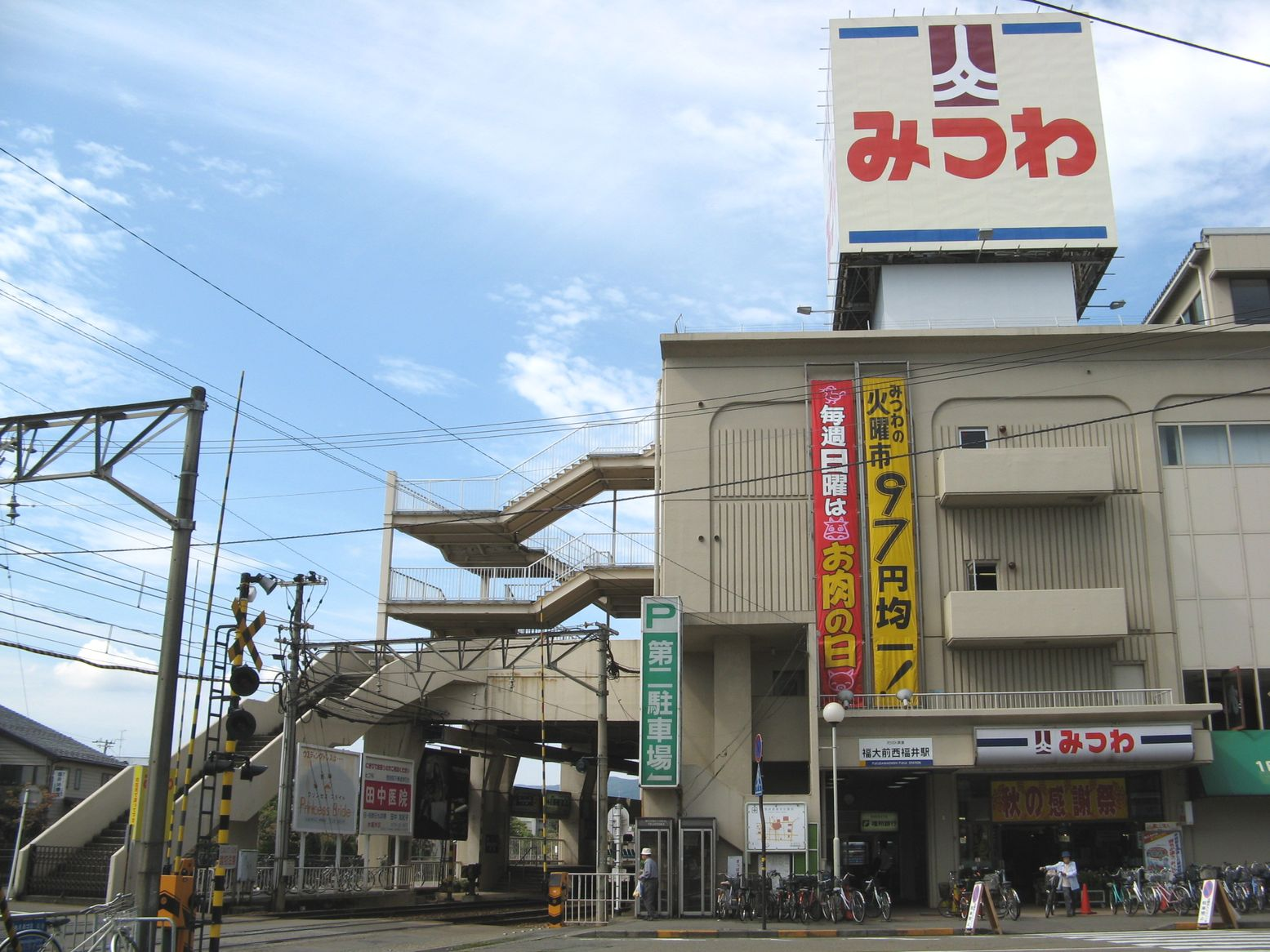
- Fukudaimae-Nishi-Fukui Station building

General information
- Location: 4-3-1 Bunkyō, Fukui-shi, Fukui-ken 910-0017; Japan
- Coordinates: 36°04′27″N 136°12′37″E
- Operator: Echizen Railway
- Line: ■ Mikuni Awara Line
- Distance: 2.8 km from Fukuiguchi
- Platforms: 2 side platforms
- Tracks: 2

Other information
- Status: Staffed
- Station code: E27
- Website: Official website

History
- Opened: December 30, 1928
- Closed: 2001-2007
- Former names: Nisei-Fukui (to 2007)
Location
- Location within Japan

Fukudaimae-Nishi-Fukui Station (福大前西福井駅, Fukudaimaenishi-Fukui-eki) is an Echizen Railway Mikuni Awara Line railway station located in the city of Fukui, Fukui Prefecture, Japan.

== Lines ==
Fukudaimae-Nishi-Fukui Station is served by the Mikuni Awara Line, and is located 2.8 kilometers from the terminus of the line at Fukuiguchi.

== Station layout ==
The station consists of two opposed side platforms enclosed by the Keifuku Nisei-Fukui Building, with a Mitsuwa home improvement center as the main tenant. The station is staffed.

== Adjacent stations ==
«	Service	»
Mikuni Awara Line
Express: Does not stop at this station
Tawaramachi	Local	Nikkakagaku-Mae

== History ==
The station was opened on December 30, 1928 as Nishi-Fukui Station (西福井駅). On September 1, 1942 the Keifuku Electric Railway merged with Mikuni Awara Electric Railway. Operations were halted from June 25, 2001. The station reopened on September 1, 2007 as an Echizen Railway station under its present name.

== Surrounding area ==
- This station serves the national University of Fukui. There are also many apartments, pensions, student guesthouses and dormitories nearby, as well as shops and private residences.
- Many other schools educational institutions are located nearby, including Fukui Prefectural Commercial Senior High School, Keishin Senior High School, and Fukui University of Technology.
- Other points of interest include:
  - Fukui Kentoku Post Office
  - Fukujinkai Hospital
  - Hinode Ryokan

== See also ==
- List of railway stations in Japan
