= Matsumoto Machiya Station =

Railway station in Fukui, Fukui Prefecture, Japan

Matsumoto Machiya Station まつもと町屋駅
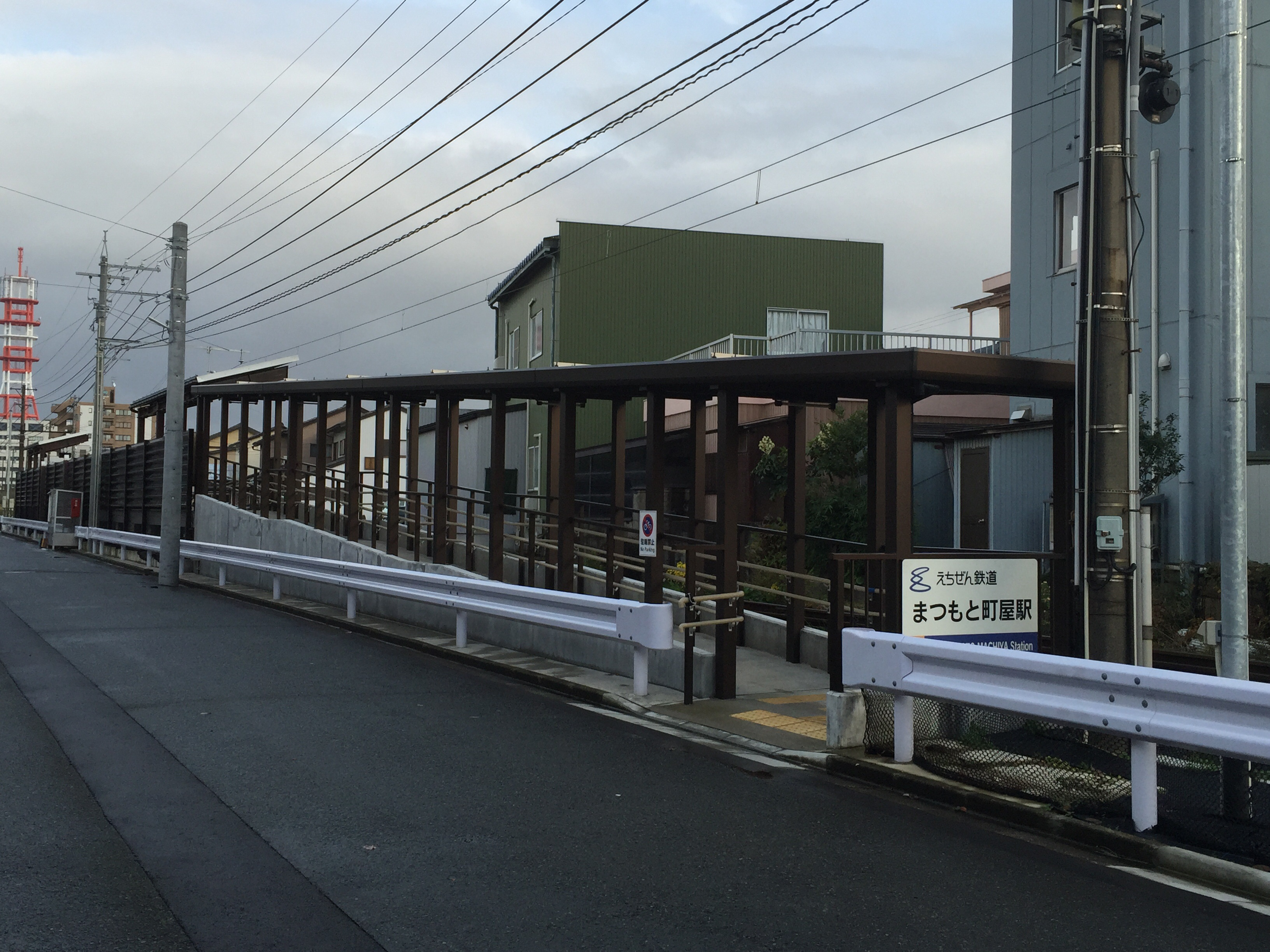
- Nishbetsuin Station in November 2016

General information
- Location: 1-51 Matsumoto, Fukui-shi, Fukui-ken 910-0003; Japan
- Coordinates: 36°4′37″N 136°13′44″E
- Distance: 1.0 km from Fukuiguchi
- Platforms: 1 side platforms
- Tracks: 1

Other information
- Status: Unstaffed
- Station code: E24
- Website: Official website

History
- Opened: September 27, 2015
Location
- Location within Japan

Matsumoto Machiya Station (まつもと町屋駅, Matsumoto Machiya-eki) is an Echizen Railway Mikuni Awara Line railway station located in the city of Fukui, Fukui Prefecture, Japan.

== Lines ==
Matsumoto Machiya Station is served by the Mikuni Awara Line, and is located 1.0 kilometers from the terminus of the line at Fukuiguchi.

== Station layout ==
The station consists of one side platform serving a single bi-directional track. The station is unattended.

== Adjacent stations ==
«	Service	»
Mikuni Awara Line
Express: Does not stop at this station
Fukuiguchi	Local	Nishibetsuin

== History ==
Matsumoto Machiya Station was opened on September 27, 2015.

== Surrounding area ==
- The area is primarily residential.

== See also ==
- List of railway stations in Japan
