= Banden Station =

Railway station in Awara, Fukui Prefecture, Japan

Banden Station 番田駅
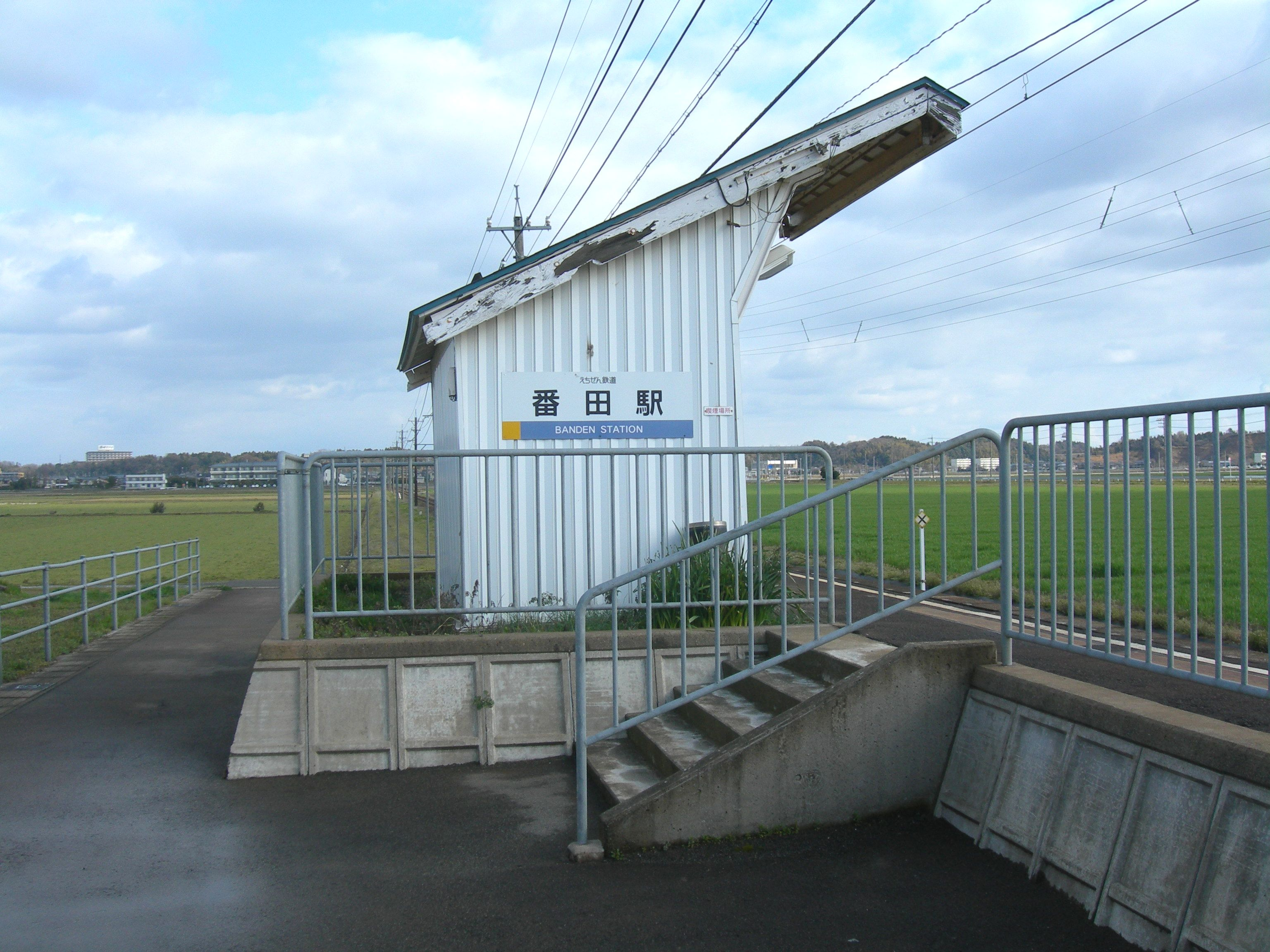
- Banden Station

General information
- Location: 34-48-3 Banden, Awara-shi, Fukui-ken 910-4123; Japan
- Coordinates: 36°12′44″N 136°12′08″E
- Operator: Echizen Railway
- Line: ■ Mikuni Awara Line
- Distance: 18.3 km from Fukuiguchi
- Platforms: 1 side platform
- Tracks: 1

Other information
- Status: Unstaffed
- Station code: E39
- Website: Official website

History
- Opened: December 30, 1928
Location
- Location within Japan

Banden Station (番田駅, Banden-eki) is an Echizen Railway Mikuni Awara Line railway station located in the city of Awara, Fukui Prefecture, Japan.

== Lines ==
Banden Station is served by the Mikuni Awara Line, and is located 18.3 kilometers from the terminus of the line at Fukuiguchi.

== Station layout ==
The station consists of one side platform serving a single bi-directional track. There is no station building, but only a shelter on the platform. The station is unstaffed.

== Adjacent stations ==
«	Service	»
Mikuni Awara Line
Express: Does not stop at this station
Honjō	Local	Awara-Yunomachi

== History ==
Banden Station was opened on December 30, 1928. On September 1, 1942 the Keifuku Electric Railway merged with Mikuni Awara Electric Railway. Operations were halted from June 25, 2001. The station reopened on August 10, 2003 as an Echizen Railway station.

== Surrounding area ==
- Except for one or two homes, the station is surrounded by fields. The center of Awara can be seen in the distance.

== See also ==
- List of railway stations in Japan
