= Mikuni-Minato Station =

Railway station in Sakai, Fukui Prefecture, Japan

Mikuni-Minato Station 三国港駅
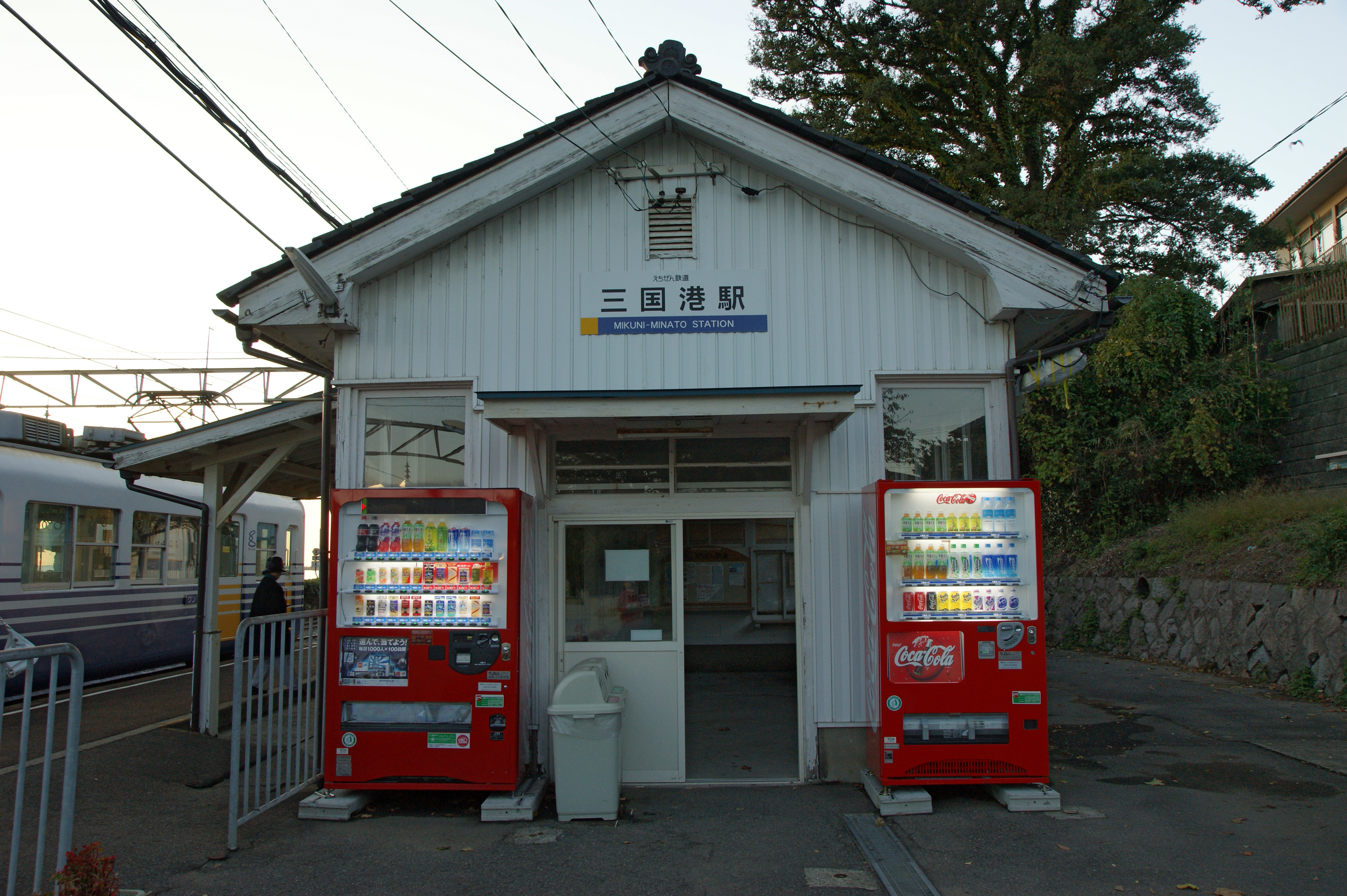
- Mikuni-Minato Station entrance

General information
- Location: 1-16-1 Shuku, Mikuni-chō, Sakai-shi, Fukui-ken 913-0056; Japan
- Coordinates: 36°13′13″N 136°08′24″E
- Operator: Echizen Railway
- Line: ■ Mikuni Awara Line
- Distance: 25.2 km from Fukuiguchi
- Platforms: 1 side platform
- Tracks: 1

Other information
- Status: Unstaffed
- Station code: E44
- Website: Official website

History
- Opened: December 15, 1927

Passengers
- FY2015: 156 (daily)
Location
- Location within Japan

Mikuni-Minato Station (三国港駅, Mikuni-minato-eki) is an Echizen Railway Mikuni Awara Line railway station located in the city of Sakai, Fukui Prefecture, Japan.

== Lines ==
Mikuni Station is a terminal station on the Mikuni Awara Line, and is located 25.2 kilometers from the opposing terminus of the line at Fukuiguchi.

== Station layout ==
The station consists of one side platform serving a single bi-directional track. The station is unattended, but there is a waiting area inside the wooden station building.

== Adjacent stations ==
«	Service	»
Mikuni Awara Line
Mikuni	Express	Terminus
Mikuni	Local	Terminus

== History ==
Mikuni-Minato Station was opened on July 1, 1914 as a freight terminal on the Japanese Government Railways Mikuni Line. Regular passenger operations began from December 15, 1927. JGR passenger operations ceased on October 11, 1944; however, Keifuku Electric Railway reopened the station as the terminus of the Mikuni Awara Line. Freight operations were discontinued by JNR on March 1, 1972 and the station was closed on June 25, 2001. The station reopened on August 10, 2003 under its present name as an Echizen Railway station.

== Passenger statistics ==
In fiscal 2015, the station was used by an average of 156 passengers daily (boarding passengers only).

== Surrounding area ==
- To the south lies the mouth of the Kuzuryū River, which empties into the Sea of Japan. The port of Mikuni and some beaches are also nearby.
- Prefectural Route 7 runs in front of the station. National Route 305 lies across the river.
- Other points of interest include:
  - Mikuni Sunset Beach
  - Mikuni Hot Spring Yuaport
  - Mikuni Morning Market
  - Mikuni Yacht Harbor
  - Mikuni Sports Park
  - Takidanji Temple

== See also ==
- List of railway stations in Japan
