= Washizuka-Haribara Station =

Railway station in Fukui, Fukui Prefecture, Japan

Washizuka-Haribara Station 鷲塚針原駅
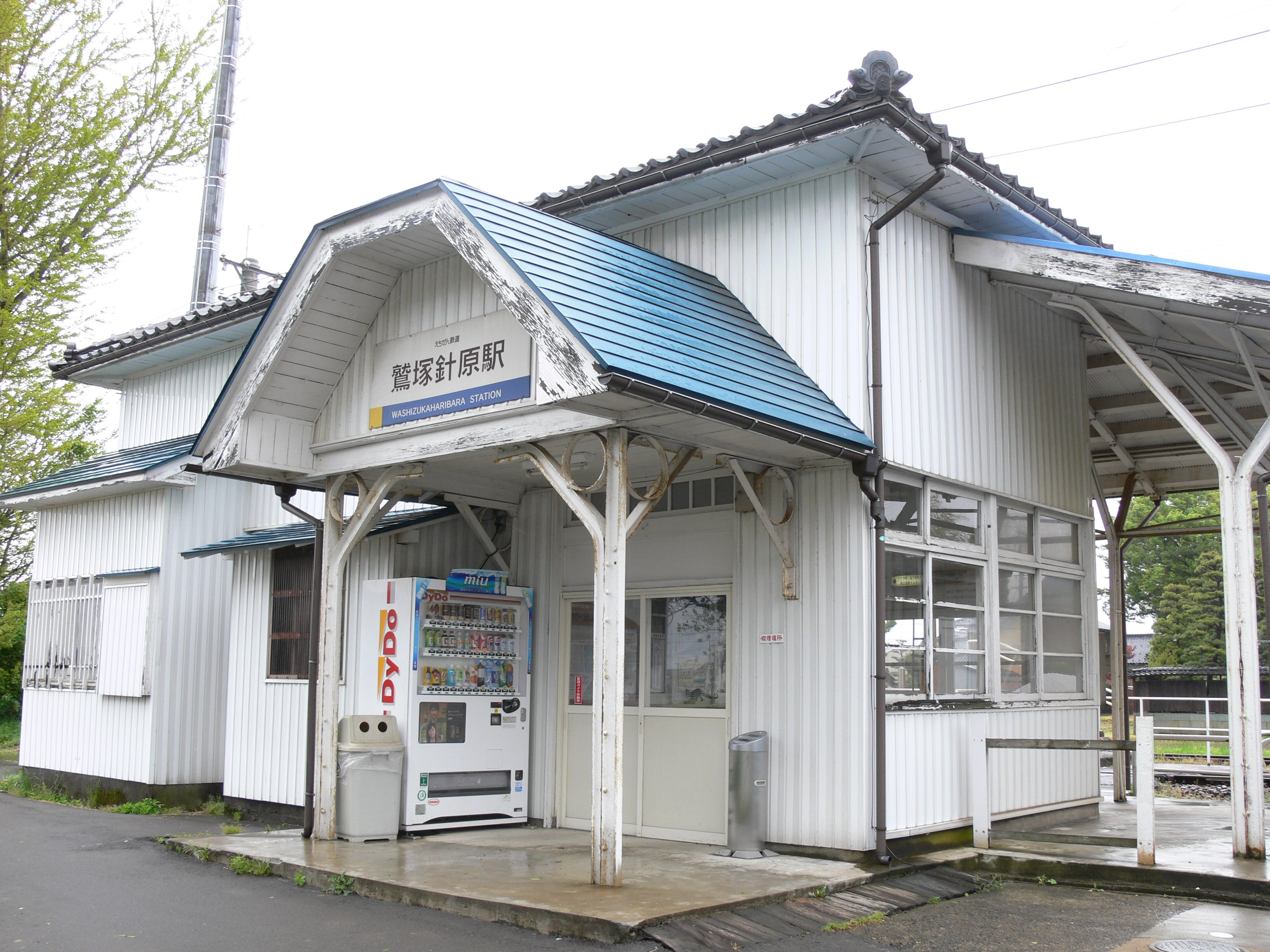
- Washizuka-Haribara Station in April 2009

General information
- Location: 32 Kawai-Washizuka-chō, Fukui-shi, Fukui-ken 910-0102; Japan
- Coordinates: 36°07′14″N 136°12′17″E
- Operator: Echizen Railway
- Line: ■ Mikuni Awara Line
- Distance: 8.1 km from Fukuiguchi
- Platforms: 1 side platform
- Tracks: 1

Other information
- Status: Unstaffed
- Station code: E32
- Website: Official website

History
- Opened: December 30, 1928
Location
- Location within Japan

Washizuka-Haribara Station (鷲塚針原駅, Washizuka-haribara-eki) is an Echizen Railway Mikuni Awara Line railway station located in the city of Fukui, Fukui Prefecture, Japan.

== Lines ==
Washizuka-Haribara Station is served by the Mikuni Awara Line, and is located 8.1 kilometers from the terminus of the line at Fukuiguchi.

== Station layout ==
The station consists of one island platform and one side platform; however, only the side platform is in use, and serves a single bi-directional track. The station is unattended. The wooden station building is protected by the government as a Registered Tangible Cultural Property.

== Adjacent stations ==
«	Service	»
Mikuni Awara Line
Nittazuka	Express	Taromaru Angelland
Nakatsuno	Local	Taromaru Angelland

== History ==
Washizuka-Haribara Station was opened on December 30, 1928. On September 1, 1942, the Keifuku Electric Railway merged with Mikuni Awara Electric Railway. Operations were halted from June 25, 2001. The station reopened on August 10, 2003, as an Echizen Railway station.

== Surrounding area ==
- Washizuka-Haribara Station borders Sakai City in the north of Fukui City. The Fukui area is known as Washizuka; the corresponding area in nearby Sakai is Haribara.
- Rice fields surround the station. There is a small farming community in the vicinity, with homes and shops a further distance to the east.
- Other points of interest include:
  - Fukui Prefecture Drivers Education Center (800 meters north)
  - Fukui - Ishikawa Prefectural Route 5 (Awara Kaidō)
  - Kawai Post Office

== See also ==
- List of railway stations in Japan
