= Awara-Yunomachi Station =

Railway station in Awara, Fukui Prefecture, Japan

Awara-Yunomachi Station あわら湯のまち駅
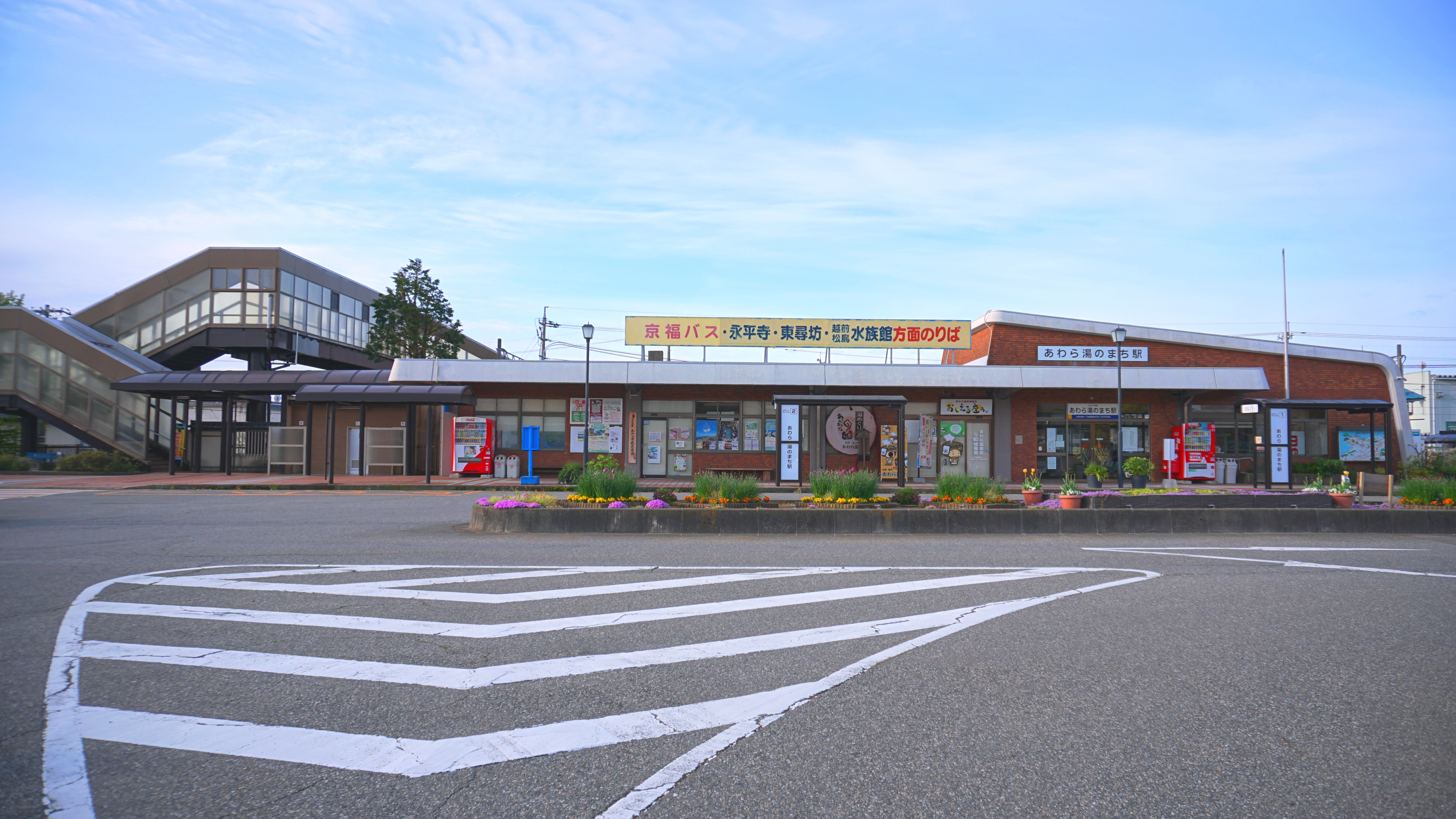
- Awara-Yunomachi Station

General information
- Location: 33-1-5 Futaomote, Awara-shi, Fukui-ken 910-4103; Japan
- Coordinates: 36°13′23″N 136°11′37″E
- Operator: Echizen Railway
- Line: ■ Mikuni Awara Line
- Distance: 20.0 km from Fukuiguchi
- Platforms: 2 side platforms
- Tracks: 2

Other information
- Status: Staffed
- Station code: E40
- Website: Official website

History
- Opened: December 15, 1911
- Former names: Awara (to 1972); Awara-Onsen (to 2003)

Passengers
- FY2015: 491
Location
- Location within Japan

Awara-Yunomachi Station (あわら湯のまち駅, Awara-yunomachi-eki) is an Echizen Railway Mikuni Awara Line railway station located in the city of Awara, Fukui Prefecture, Japan.

== Lines ==
Awara-Yunomachi Station is served by the Mikuni Awara Line, and is located 20.0 kilometers from the terminus of the line at Fukuiguchi.

== Station layout ==
The station consists of two side platforms connected by a footbridge. The station is staffed.

== Adjacent stations ==
«	Service	»
Mikuni Awara Line
Honjō	Express	Mikuni
Banden	Local	Mizui

== History ==
Awara-Yunomachi Station was opened on December 15, 1911 as a Awara Station (芦原駅, Awara-eki) on the Japanese Government Railways Mikuni Line. On September 1, 1942 the Keifuku Electric Railway merged with Mikuni Awara Electric Railway. Operations were halted from October 11, 1942 to August 15, 1946. The station was renamed to Awara-Yunomachi Station (芦原湯町駅, Awara-Yunomachi-eki) on March 1, 1972, but renamed only two weeks later to Awara-Onsen Station (芦原温泉駅, Awara-onsen-eki). Operations ceased again on June 25, 2001. The station reopened on August 10, 2003 under its present name as an Echizen Railway station.

== Passenger statistics ==
In fiscal 2016, the station was used by an average of 491 passengers daily (boarding passengers only).

== Surrounding area ==
This station serves the center of Awara City and its numerous hot spring hotels and resorts. However, most visitors to the area use JR Awaraonsen Station several kilometers away. There is also a large Keifuku and Awara community bus transfer point located in front of the station, making this station the busiest on the Awara Mikuni Line outside of Fukui City.

Other points of interest include:

- Awara City Awara Elementary School
- Awara City Library
- Awara City Health Center
- Awara City Awara Junior High School
- Mikuni Kyōteijō

== See also ==
- List of railway stations in Japan
