= Nishinagata Yurinosato Station =

Railway station in Sakai, Fukui Prefecture, Japan

Nishinagata Yurinosato Station 西長田ゆりの里駅
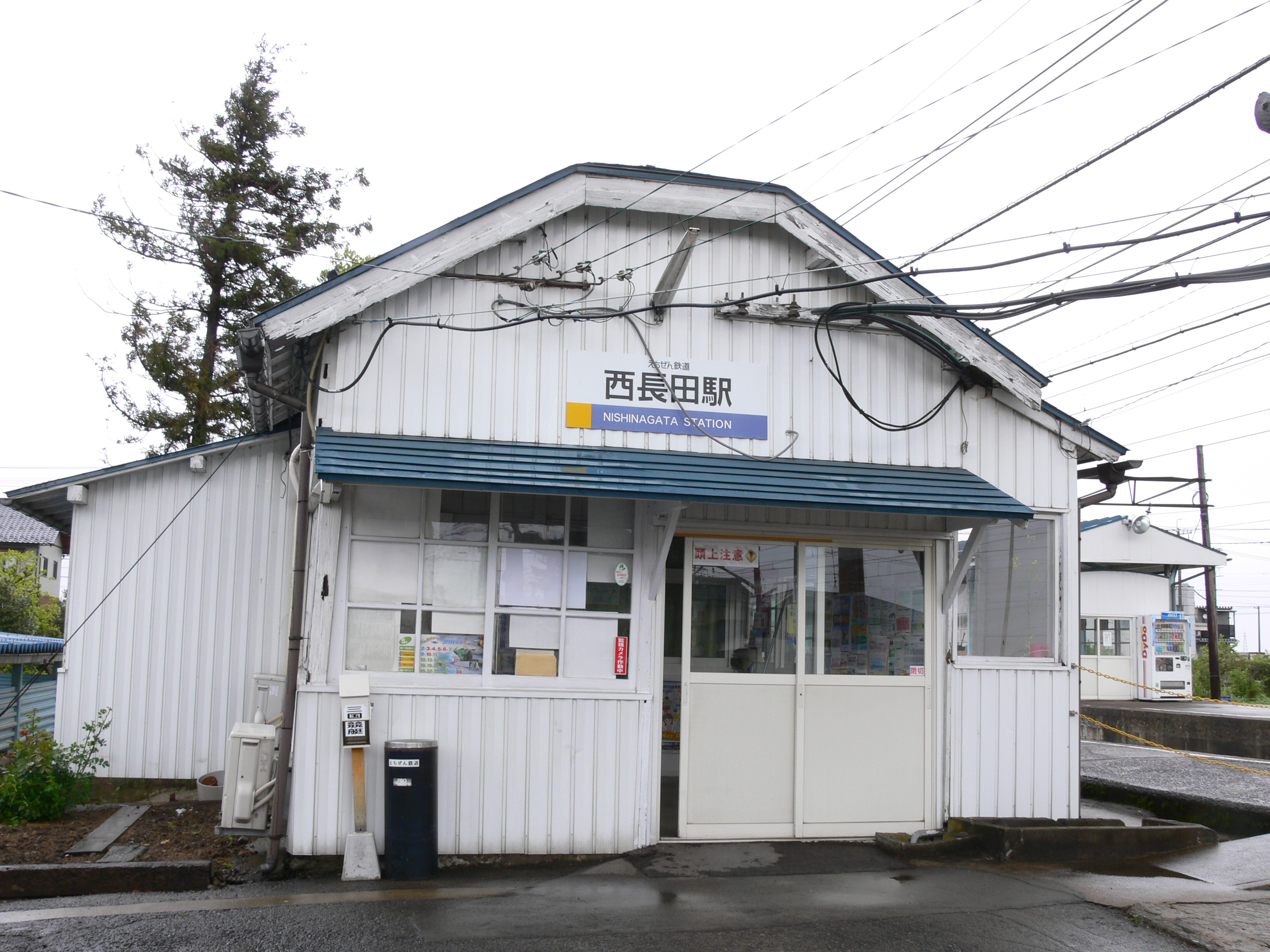
- Nishi-Nagata Station

General information
- Location: 20 Nishi-Nagata, Harue-chō, Sakai-shi, Fukui-ken 919-0404; Japan
- Coordinates: 36°09′13″N 136°12′23″E
- Operator: Echizen Railway
- Line: ■ Mikuni Awara Line
- Distance: 11.7 km from Fukuiguchi
- Platforms: 1 side + 1 island platform
- Tracks: 3

Other information
- Status: Unstaffed
- Station code: E35
- Website: Official website

History
- Opened: December 30, 1928
- Former names: Nishi-Nagata (until 2017)

Passengers
- FY2015: 165 (daily)
Location
- Location within Japan

Nishinagata Yurinosato Station (西長田ゆりの里駅, Nishinagata-Yurinosato-eki) is an Echizen Railway Mikuni Awara Line railway station located in the site of Sakai, Fukui Prefecture, Japan.

== Lines ==
Nishinagata-Yurinosato Station is served by the Mikuni Awara Line, and is located 11.7 kilometers from the terminus of the line at Fukuiguchi.

== Station layout ==
The station consists of one side platform and one island platform connected to the station building by a level crossing. The station is unattended.

== Adjacent stations ==
«	Service	»
Mikuni Awara Line
Express: Does not stop at this station
Nishiharue Heartopia	Local	Shimohyogo Kofuku

== History ==
Nishinagata Yurinosato Station was opened on December 30, 1928, as Nishinagata Station (西長田駅, Nishinagata-eki). On September 1, 1942, the Keifuku Electric Railway merged with Mikuni Awara Electric Railway and adsorbed the Maruoka Railway on December 1, 1944. The Maruoka Line was abolished on July 11, 1968. Operations were halted from June 25, 2001. The station reopened on August 10, 2003, as an Echizen Railway station. It was renamed to its present name on March 25, 2017.

== Passenger statistics ==
In fiscal 2015, the station was used by an average of 165 passengers daily (boarding passengers only).

== Surrounding area ==
- The area is mostly rice fields with scattered farming settlements. Fukui Prefectural Route 5 is 300 meters west.
- Other points of interest include:
  - Sakai City Ōishi Elementary School
  - Yurinosato Park

== See also ==
- List of railway stations in Japan
