= 番田駅 =

番田駅 may refer to:

- Banda Station
- Banden Station
