= Nittazuka Station =

Railway station in Fukui, Fukui Prefecture, Japan

Nittazuka Station 新田塚駅
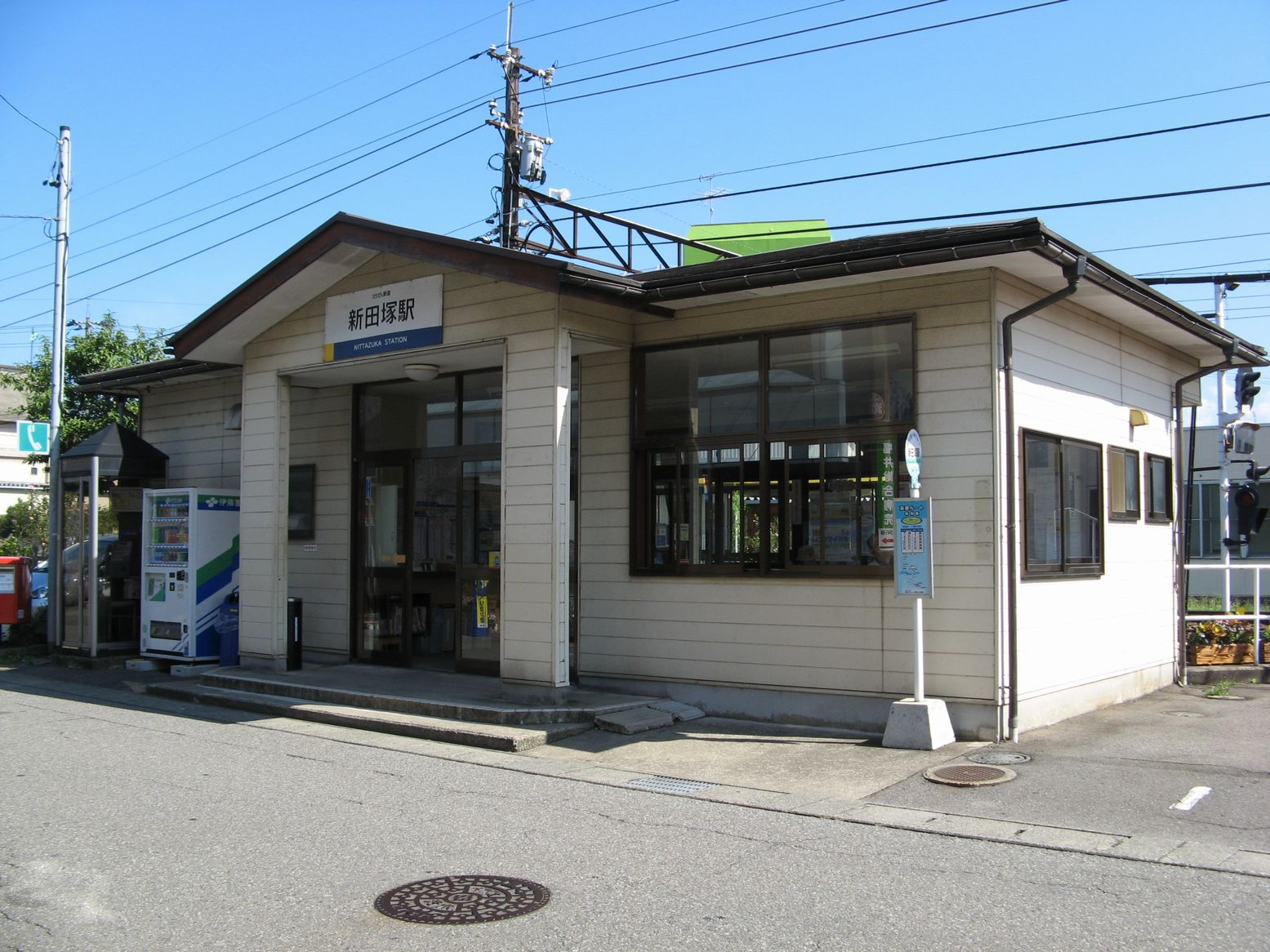
- Nittazuka Station in October 2007

General information
- Location: 2-100 Nittazuka, Fukui-shi, Fukui-ken 910-0067; Japan
- Coordinates: 36°05′32″N 136°12′19″E
- Operator: Echizen Railway
- Line: ■ Mikuni Awara Line
- Distance: 4.9 km from Fukuiguchi
- Platforms: 1 side + 1 island platform
- Tracks: 3

Other information
- Status: Staffed
- Station code: E30
- Website: Official website

History
- Opened: December 30, 1928
Location
- Location within Japan

Nittazuka Station (新田塚駅, Nittazuka-eki) is an Echizen Railway Mikuni Awara Line railway station located in the city of Fukui, Fukui Prefecture, Japan.

== Lines ==
Nittazuka Station is served by the Mikuni Awara Line, and is located 4.9 kilometers from the terminus of the line at Fukuiguchi.

== Station layout ==
The station consists of one island platform and one side platform connected by a level crossing. The station is staffed, except for early mornings and late nights. A Keifuku bus stop and a municipal shared-taxi stand provide connecting service.

== Adjacent stations ==
«	Service	»
Mikuni Awara Line
Yatsushima	Express	Washizuka-Haribara
Yatsushima	Local	Nakatsuno

== History ==
Nittazuka Station was opened on December 30, 1928. On September 1, 1942 the Keifuku Electric Railway merged with Mikuni Awara Electric Railway. Operations were halted from June 25, 2001. The station reopened on August 10, 2003 as an Echizen Railway station.

== Surrounding area ==
- The station sits in the northwestern part of Fukui's urbanized area; a quiet residential area lies to the west, and a large private hospital and related facilities are just to the east.
- Other points of interest include:
  - Fukui General Clinic
  - Fukui Nittazuka Post Office
  - Seiren Co., Ltd. Nitta Plant

== See also ==
- List of railway stations in Japan
