= Mikuni Awara Line =

Echizen Railway Mikuni Awara Line
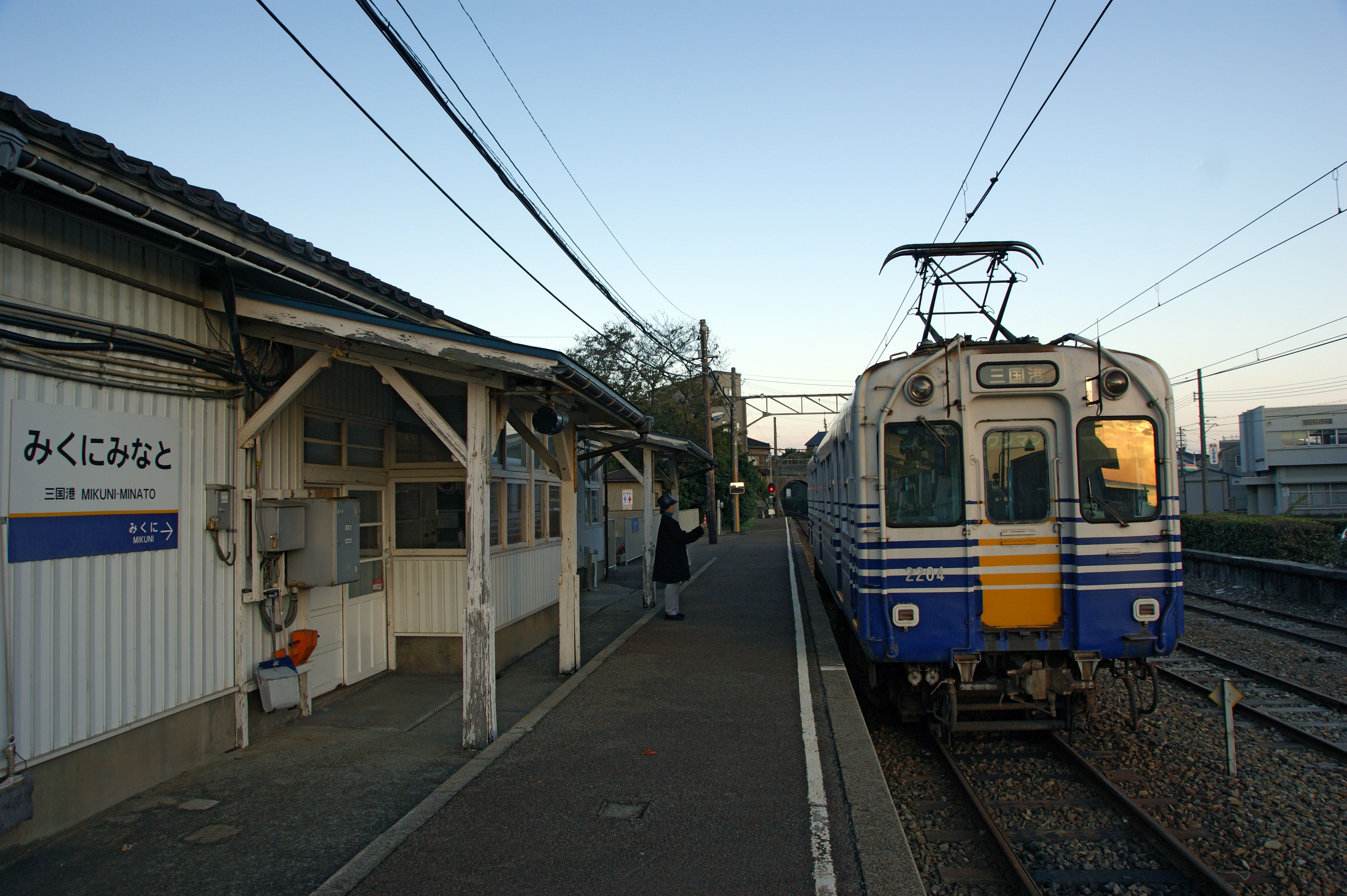
- Echizen Railway MC2201 series train at Mikuni-Minato Station

Overview
- Owner: Echizen Railway
- Locale: Fukui Prefecture
- Termini: Fukuiguchi; Mikuni-Minato
- Stations: 23

Service
- Type: Heavy rail

History
- Opened: 1928

Technical
- Line length: 25.2 km (15.7 mi)
- Track gauge: 1,067 mm (3 ft 6 in)
- Electrification: 600 V DC, overhead catenary

The Mikuni Awara Line (三国芦原線, Mikuni-awara-sen) is a railway line operated by Echizen Railway in Fukui Prefecture. The line extends 27.8 km from the city of Fukui to Mikuni-Minato station at Sakai with a total of 22 stations. It was operated by Keifuku Electric Railway until 2001; Echizen Railway took over the line in 2003.

== Service ==
Although the line technically begins at Fukuiguchi Station, all trains run through and terminate at Fukui Station. Trains run twice per hour during the day in order to connect with Hokuriku Main Line limited express trains. During morning peak hours between 7:00 and 9:00, three trains run per hour. There is a single Fukui-bound rapid train each morning, as well as a local "Mezamashi Train" (lit. "wake-up train") departing Mikuni-Minato at 5:16 am every Monday morning that connects with Osaka and Nagoya-bound JR West limited express trains departing from Fukui Station.

All trains run under driver-only operation, but on-board female attendants sell and collect tickets, make station announcements, and assist passengers boarding and alighting. Doors are operated by the driver.

== History ==
Mikuni Awara Electric Railway began operating the line in 1928 between Fukuiguchi Station and Awara Station (now Awara-Yunomachi Station). A year later the line was extended to Mikunichō (now Mikuni), and through service began on the Kyōto Dentō Echizen Main Line to Fukui Station. The line became a part of Keifuku Electric Railway in 1942. Two accidents in 2000 and 2001 on the Echizen Main Line forced Keifuku to cease operation on both it and the Mikuni Awara Line in 2001. The line was eventually transferred to Echizen Railway in 2003.

=== Chronology ===
- December 30, 1928: Mikuni Awara Electric Railway begins operations between Fukuiguchi — Awara (now Awara-Yunomachi) stations.
- January 31, 1929: Awara — Mikunichō (now Mikuni) section opens.
- February 10, 1929: Mikunichō Station renamed Densha-Mikuni Station.
- June 1, 1929: Nakatsuno Station opens.
- October 10, 1929: Through operation on the Kyōto Dentō Echizen Main Line to Fukui Station begins.
- December 1, 1929: Nishi-Betsuin Station opens.
- July 1, 1930: Mikuni-Jinja Station opens.
- April 1, 1937: Tawaramachi Station opens.
- May 28, 1937: Densha-Mikuni — Tōjinbōguchi section opens.
- August 1, 1942: Mikuni Awara Electric Railway merges with Keifuku Electric Railway.
- January 11, 1944: Operation halted between Densha-Mikuni — Tōjinbōguchi.
- April 20, 1944: Tawaramachi, Yatsushima, Tarōmaru, Mikuni-Jinja Stations closes.
- October 11, 1944: Former JNR Mikuni Line electrified; Mikuni — Mikuni-Minato section opens. Densha-Mikuni and JNR Mikuni stations merge.
- April 5, 1945: Tarōmaru, Mikuni-Jinja stations reopen.
- August 15, 1946: Mikuni-Jinja Station closes.
- June 1, 1950: Mikuni-Jinja Station reopen.
- November 27, 1950: Tawaramachi Station reopens. Connecting service with Fukui Railway begins.
- March 21, 1968: Mikuni — Tōjinbōguchi section abolished.
- March 1, 1971: Freight operations end.
- March 1, 1972: Awara Station renamed Awara-Yumachi Station.
- April 20, 1989: Driver-only operation initiated during non-peak hours.
- March 20, 1990: Driver-only operation initiated throughout the day.
- September 10, 1992: Jin'ai Ground-Mae Station opens temporarily.
- June 25, 2001: Due to accidents on the Echizen Main Line, service halted on the Mikuni Awara Line.
- February 1, 2003: Line transferred to Echizen Railway.
- July 20, 2003: Fukuiguchi — Nishi-Nagata section operation restarts. Nishi-Fukui Station renamed Fukudaimae-Nishi-Fukui Station; Awara-Yumachi Station renamed Awara-Yunomachi Station.
- August 10, 2003: Nishi-Nagata — Mikuni-Minato section operation restarts.
- September 1, 2007: Nikkakagakumae, Yatsushima stations open.
- September 27, 2015: Matsumoto Machiya station opens.
- March 25, 2017: Tarōmaru, Nishi-Harue, Nishi-Nagata and Shimo-Hyōgo stations renamed as Taromaru Angelland, Nishiharue Heartpia, Nishinagata Yurinosato and Shimohyogo Kofuku.

=== Former connecting lines ===
- Nishi Nagata Station: The Maruoka Railway opened a 4 km 762 mm gauge line to Shin-Maruoka in 1915. In 1930, it was regauged to 1,067 mm and electrified at 600 V DC in conjunction with the opening of the Eiheiji Line to Shin-Maruoka from Arawa Onsen. The following year, a 3 km electrified line was opened from Shin-Maruoka to Maruoka on the Hokuriku Main Line. The company merged with the Keifuku Railway in 1944, and the entire 7 km line closed in 1968.
- Mikuni Station - An 8 km line to Arawa Onsen on the Hokuriku Main Line operated between 1911 and 1972.

== Rolling stock ==
Echizen Railway uses twenty-five cars total in its entire railway. The main type active is the MC6101 with twelve cars, followed by MC2101 with eight cars, MC6001 with two cars, and three other types with one car each.

== Stations ==
No.	Station	Japanese	Distance (km)	Express	Rapid	Transfers	Location
Katsuyama Eiheiji Line
E1	Fukui*	福井駅	1.5		●	JR West: Hokuriku Main Line; Fukui Railway: Fukubu Line (Fukui-eki)	Fukui
E2	Shin-Fukui	新福井駅	1.0		●		Fukui
Mikuni Awara Line
E3	Fukuiguchi*	福井口駅	0.0		●	Echizen Railway: Katsuyama Eiheiji Line	Fukui
E24	Matsumoto Machiya	まつもと町屋駅	1.0		●		Fukui
E25	Nishi-Betsuin*	西別院駅	1.6		●		Fukui
E26	Tawaramachi*	田原町駅	2.1	●	●	Fukui Railway: Fukubu Line (Some direct)	Fukui
E27	Fukudaimae-Nishi-Fukui*	福大前西福井駅	2.8	●	●		Fukui
E28	Nikkakagaku-Mae	日華化学前駅	3.6	●	●		Fukui
E29	Yatsushima	八ツ島駅	4.2	●	●		Fukui
E30	Nittazuka*	新田塚駅	4.9	●	●		Fukui
E31	Nakatsuno	中角駅	5.9	｜	｜		Fukui
—N/a	Jin'ai-Ground-Mae (temporary)	仁愛グランド前駅	-	｜	｜		Fukui
E32	Washizuka-Haribara	鷲塚針原駅	8.1	●	●		Fukui
E33	Taromaru Angelland	太郎丸エンゼルランド駅	9.2		●		Sakai
E34	Nishiharue Heartpia	西春江ハートピア駅	10.1		●		Sakai
E35	Nishinagata Yurinosato*	西長田ゆりの里駅	11.7		●		Sakai
E36	Shimohyogo Kofuku	下兵庫こうふく駅	13.6		●		Sakai
E37	Ōzeki	大関駅	15.4		●		Sakai
E38	Honjō	本荘駅	17.4		●		Awara
E39	Banden	番田駅	18.3		｜		Awara
E40	Awara-Yunomachi*	あわら湯のまち駅	20.0		●		Awara
E41	Mizui	水居駅	22.0		｜		Sakai
E42	Mikuni-Jinja	三国神社駅	23.4		｜		Sakai
E43	Mikuni*	三国駅	24.2		●		Sakai
E44	Mikuni-Minato	三国港駅	25.2		●		Sakai

- All stations are located in Fukui Prefecture.
- Rapid and Express trains: ● - rapid and express and local trains stop, | - rapid trains pass
- Stations marked with an asterisk (*) are staffed.

== See also ==
- List of railway lines in Japan
