= Fukuiguchi Station =

Railway station in Fukui, Fukui Prefecture, Japan

Fukuiguchi Station 福井口駅
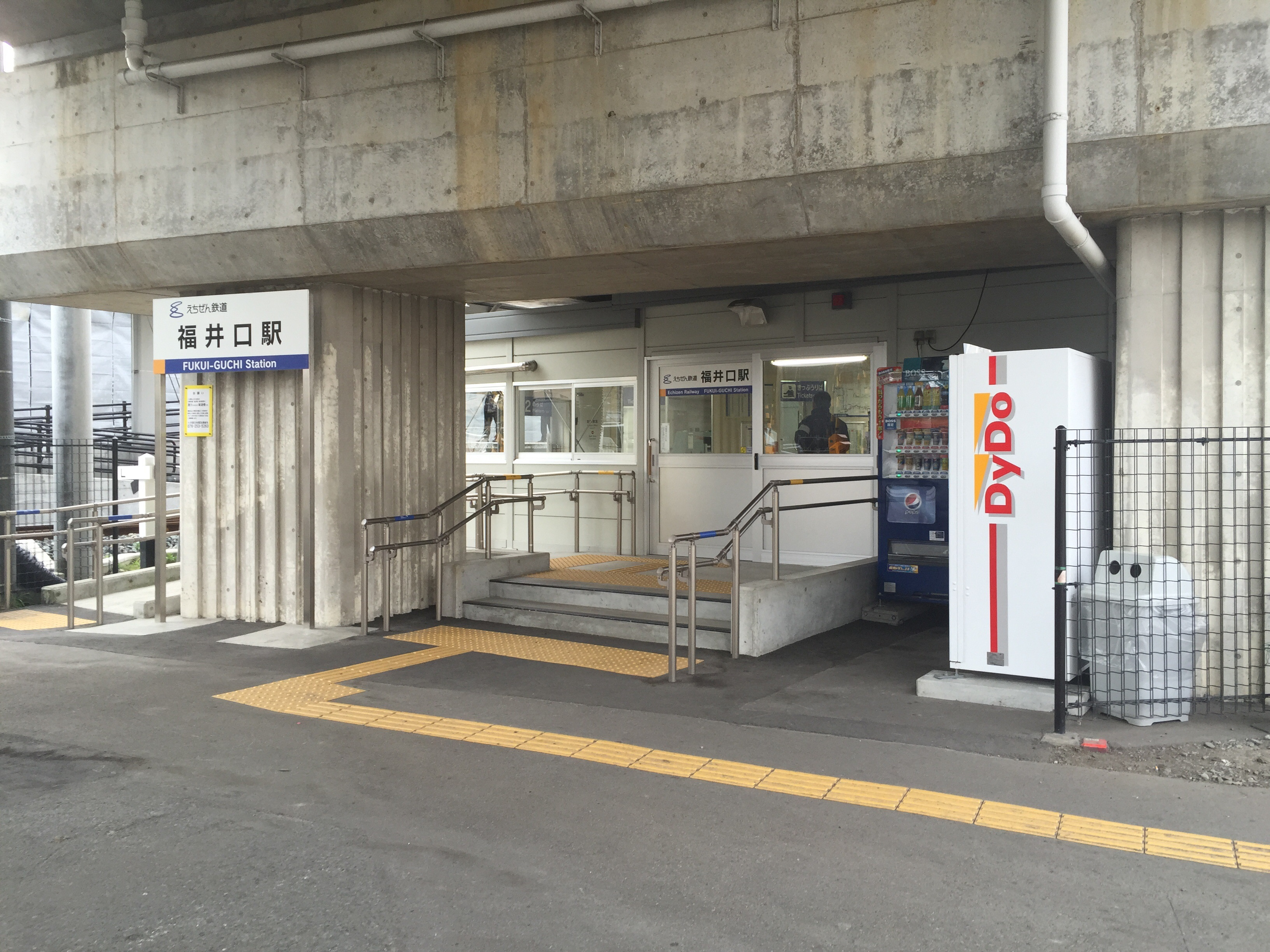
- Fukuiguchi Station entrance, November 2016

General information
- Location: 1 Matsumoto, Fukui-shi, Fukui-ken 910-0004; Japan
- Coordinates: 36°04′17″N 136°13′59″E
- Operator: Echizen Railway
- Lines: ■ Katsuyama Eiheiji Line; ■ Mikuni Awara Line
- Distance: 4.9 km from Fukuiguchi
- Platforms: 1 island platform
- Tracks: 2

Other information
- Status: Staffed
- Station code: E3
- Website: Official website

History
- Opened: February 11, 1914
Location
- Location within Japan

Fukuiguchi Station (福井口駅, Fukuiguchi-eki) is an Echizen Railway railway station located in the city of Fukui, Fukui Prefecture, Japan. It serves both the Katsuyama Eiheiji and Mikuni Awara lines.

== Lines ==
Fukuiguchi Station is served by the Katsuyama Eiheiji Line, and is located 1.5 kilometers from the terminus of the line at Fukui. It is also the terminal station of the Mikuni Awara Line, although most trains continue on to Fukui Station using the Katsuyama Eiheiji Line tracks.

== Station layout ==
The station consists of one elevated island platform with the station building located underneath. The station is staffed.

== Adjacent stations ==
«	Service	»
Katsuyama Eiheiji Line
Express: Does not stop at this station
Shin-Fukui	Local	Echizen-Kaihotsu
Mikuni Awara Line
Express: Does not stop at this station
Shin-Fukui	Local	Matsumoto Machiya

== History ==
Fukuiguchi Station was opened on February 11, 1914. The line was extended between Fukuiguchi — Awara (now Awara-Yunomachi) on December 30, 1928. On September 1, 1942 the Keifuku Electric Railway merged with Mikuni Awara Electric Railway. Operations were halted from June 25, 2001. The station reopened on July 20, 2003 as an Echizen Railway station. There were two island platforms and one other platform with a total of five tracks. On September 27, 2015 the station moved to temporary facilities , and reopened as an elevated station on June 24, 2018.

== Surrounding area ==
- Echizen Railway company headquarters
- Keifuku Bus Reservation Center
- Fukui Prefectural Hospital
- Fukui Prefecture Fukui East School for the Disabled
- Fukui Shiiguchi Post Office
- Fukui City Shinmei Junior High Schoolt

== See also ==
- List of railway stations in Japan
