= Echizen Railway =

Railway Company in Fukui Prefecture, Japan

Echizen Railway Co., Ltd.

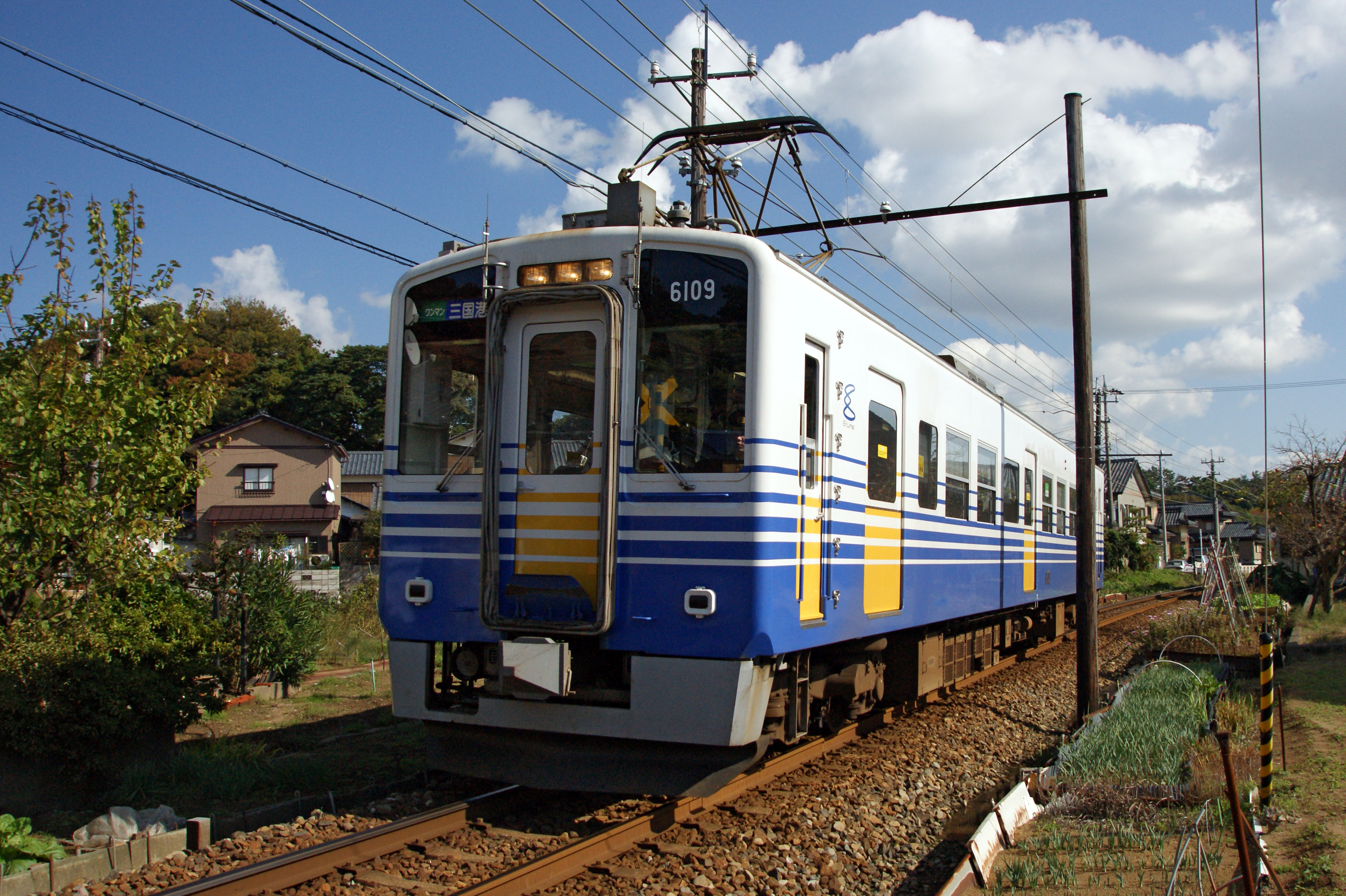
- Type: Public-private KK
- Industry: Rail transport
- Predecessor: Keifuku Electric Railroad
- Founded: September 17, 2002
- Headquarters: Fukui, Fukui Prefecture, Japan
- Area served: Northern Fukui Prefecture
- Key people: Tōru Minami, President
- Owner: Sakai City (17.4%); Katsuyama City (16.7%); Fukui City (16.1%); Eiheiji Town (12.6%); Awara City (7.0%); 42 others (30.2%)
- Number of employees: 93
- Website: www.echizen-tetudo.co.jp

Echizen Railway (えちぜん鉄道株式会社, Echizen Tetsudō Kabushikigaisha) is a third-sector railway company located in Fukui, Fukui Prefecture, Japan. It owns and operates the Katsuyama Eiheiji Line between Fukui and Katsuyama and the Mikuni Awara Line between Fukui and Sakai.

== History ==
In 1992, Keifuku Electric Railway, the predecessor of Echizen Railway, announced that it would end services between Higashi-Furuichi (now Eiheijiguchi) and Katsuyama stations on the Eiheiji Main Line (now the Katsuyama Eiheiji Line) as well as all service on the Eiheiji Line and replace them with buses. However, for several years this was fought by local municipalities; in 1997, the city of Fukui and other municipalities along the railway lines announced they would establish a committee to provide support to the company to continue operating the lines.

However, two accidents in a six-month span on the Eiheiji Main Line (one on December 17, 2000, between Shiizakai and Higashi-Furuichi stations and another on June 24, 2001, between Hossaka and Hota stations) forced the company to halt all services. The resulting effect on revenue led to the company's decision to withdraw from the railway business, and in October 2001 it officially notified the Ministry of Land, Infrastructure and Transport.

As the Eiheiji Main Line and Mikuni Awara Line were considered to be a crucial means of transport, Fukui Prefecture decided to set up a third-sector company to continue operating railway services and established Echizen Railway in 2002. On February 1, 2003, Keifuku formally transferred all tracks and equipment to Echizen Railway, and the Echizen Main Line was renamed the Katsuyama Eiheiji Line. However, the Eiheiji Line was permanently abolished (as revenue was forecast to fall below the amount needed to break even) and bus service was run in its place.

Partial service on both lines resumed on July 19, 2003, with full service resuming on the Katsuyama Eiheiji Line on August 10 and on the Mikuni Awara Line on October 19. Official service In order to gather information on passenger demographics, all ticket machines were abolished and ticket sales were handled by station employees.

Route map

== Through service with Fukui Railway ==
On May 27, 2010, Fukui Prefecture announced plans for through services between Fukui Railway and Echizen Railway. Under the plan, beginning in 2013 the Fukui Railway's Fukubu Line would connect to the Echizen Railway at Tawaramachi Station, and as many as two trains per hour in each direction would run through to Nittazuka Station. The next stage would involve extending Fukui Railway service to Nishi-Nagata Station and running Echizen Railway trains onto the Fukubu Line. As a part of this plan, five stations would be renovated.

== Rolling stock ==
As of April 1, 2014, the railway operates the following fleet of rolling stock.

=== EMUs ===
- 1101 series: 1 car
- 2201 series: 1 car
- 5001 series: 1 car
- 6001 series: 2 cars
- 6101 series: 12 cars
- 7000 series 2-car EMUs (5 sets, converted from former JR Central 119 series EMUs)
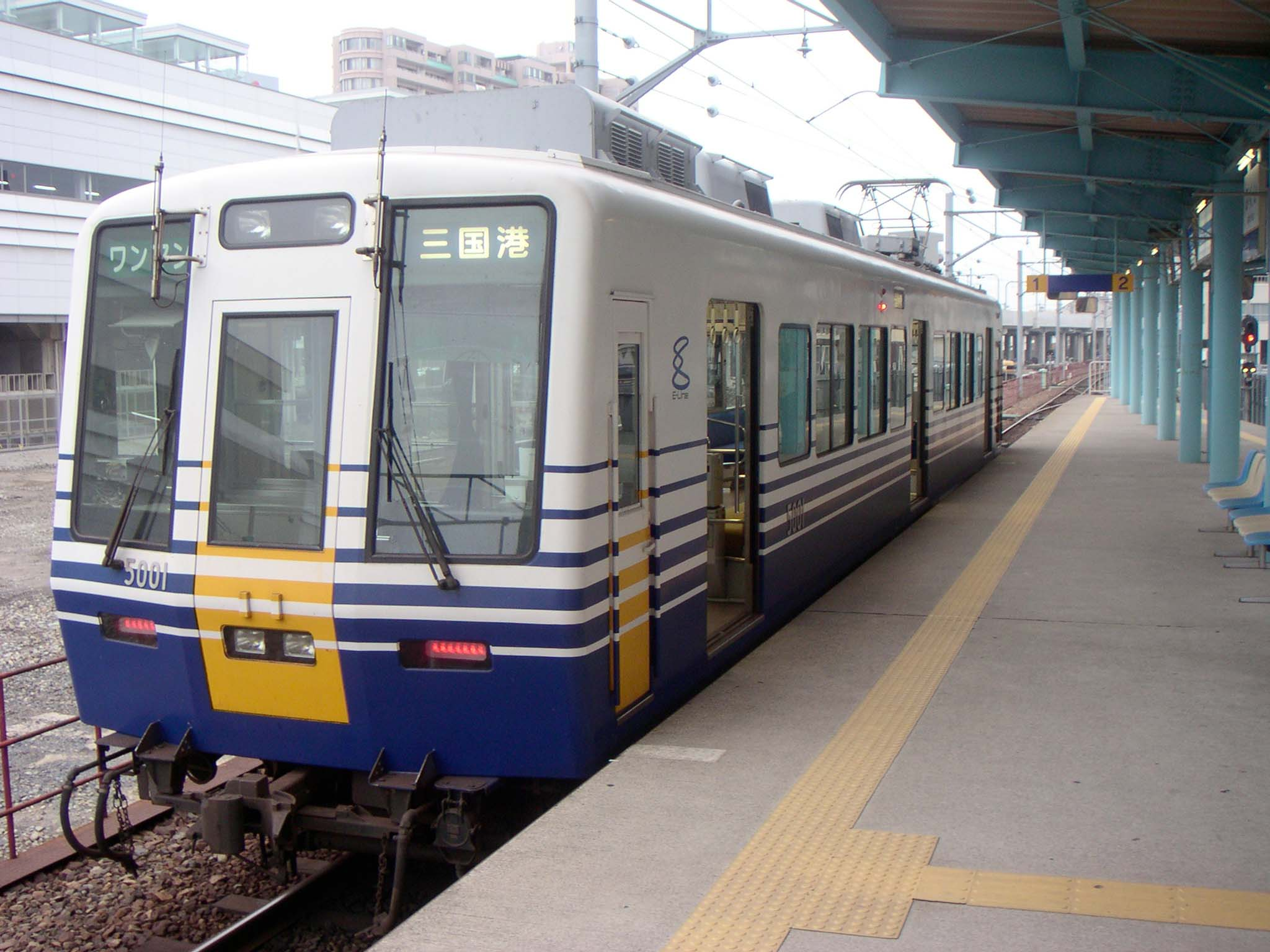
5000 series EMU car 5001, July 2005

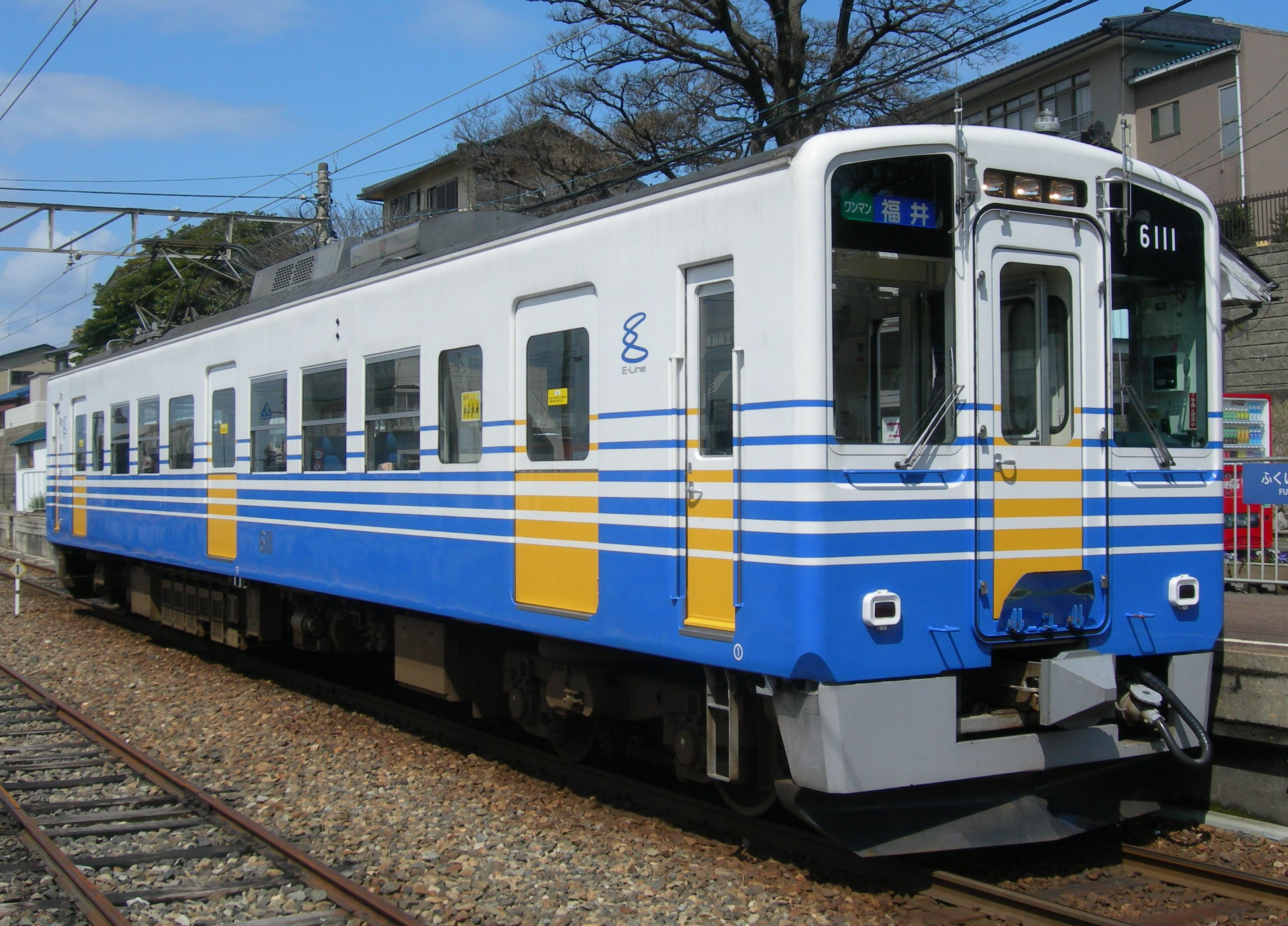
6101 series EMU car 6111

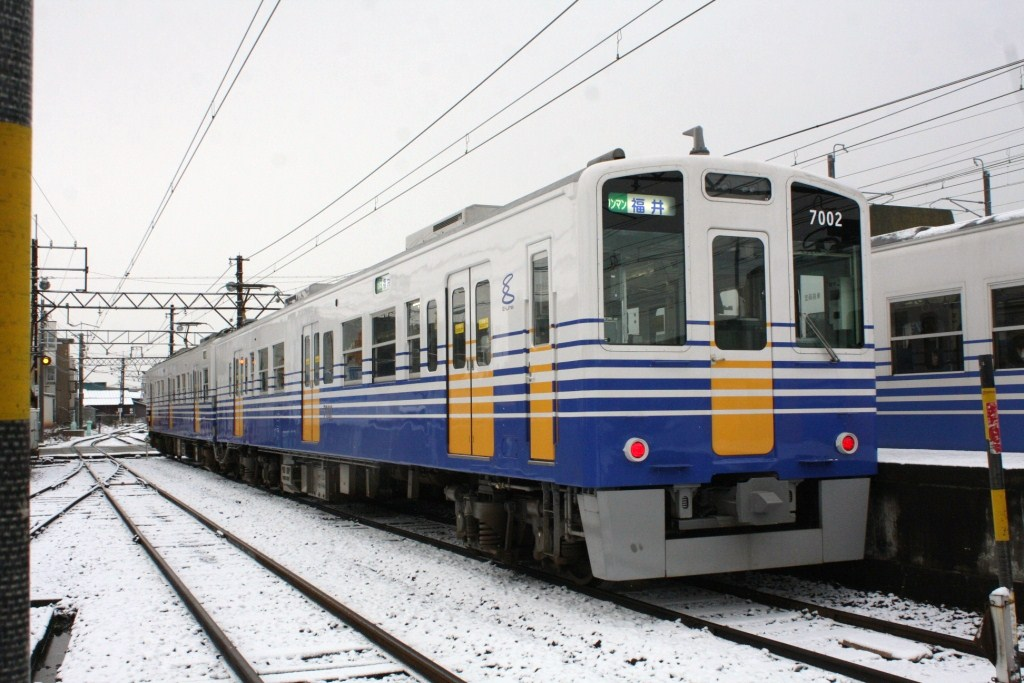
7000 series EMU

=== Electric locomotives ===
- Class ML521: two locomotives, numbered 521 and 522
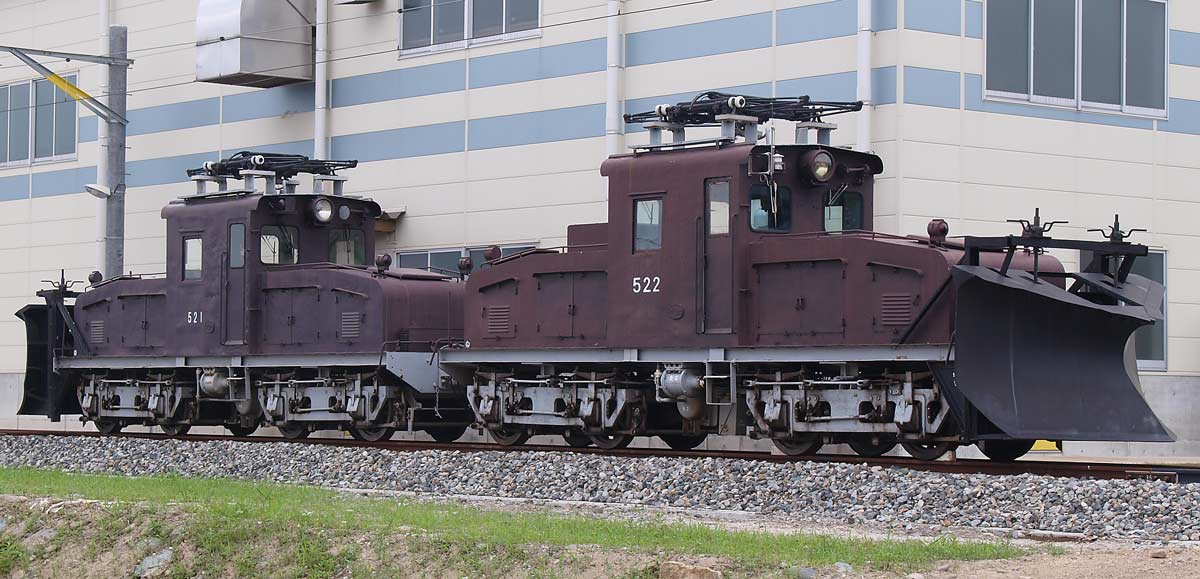
Class ML521 locomotives 521 and 522 in June 2009

=== Former rolling stock ===
- 2101 series EMUs
- Class ML6: one locomotive
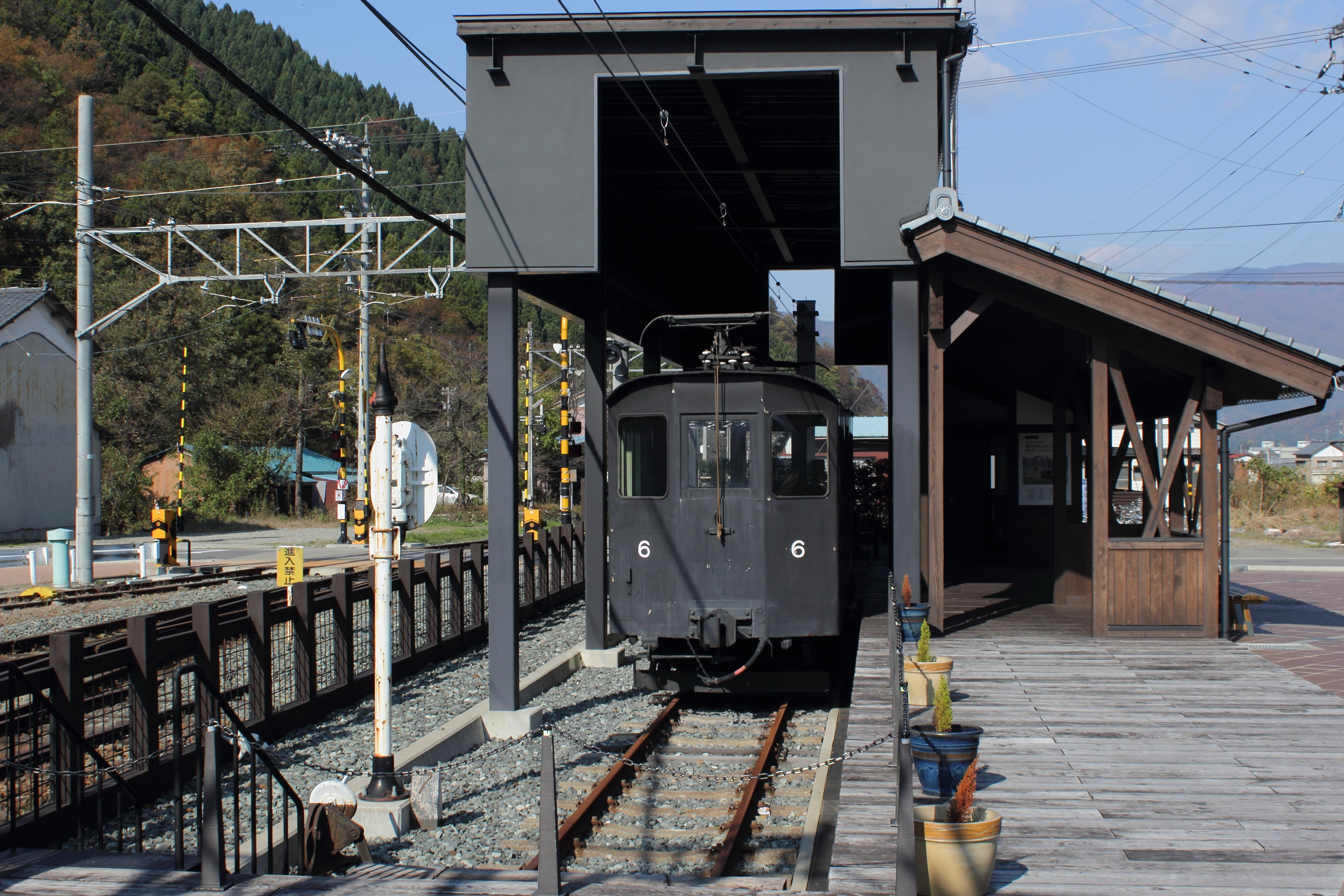
Preserved Class ML6 locomotive in November 2013
