= List of stations opened by petition in Japan =

In Japan some railway stations were built in response to a petition of the local governments or companies near the new station etc., and the railway company did not bear all construction costs. These are called seigan-eki (請願駅) in Japanese. This article lists some of these stations.

The first station opened by petition on a JR line was Higashi-Koganei Station on the Chūō Main Line, which was opened in 1964 before privatization of the Japanese National Railways (JNR). This station is located close to a commemoration hall.

== Shinkansen stations ==
Sorted by opening year

- Mishima^{1}
- Shin-Hanamaki
- Mizusawa-Esashi
- Shin-Fuji
- Kakegawa^{1}
- Mikawa-Anjō
- Shin-Onomichi
- Higashi-Hiroshima
- Kurikoma-Kōgen
- Asa^{2}
- Honjō-Waseda

^{1} A station already existed on the Tōkaidō Main Line.
^{2} A station already existed on the Sanyō Main Line.

== JR lines other than Shinkansen ==
Stations opened after privatization of JNR

=== JR Hokkaido ===
- Ōasa
- Shinrin-Kōen
- Hoshimi
- Sapporo Beer Teien
- Hokkaidō-Iryōdaigaku
- Shin-Fuji
- Midorigaoka
- Nishi-Rubeshibe
- ROYCE' Town
- Nayorokōkō
- F-Village Station (Under construction, to be opened by 2028)

=== JR East ===
- WeSPa-Tsubakiyama
- Shiwachūō
- Akitashirakami
- Ikawa-Sakura
- Maegata
- Ishinomakiayumino
- Izumi-Sotoasahikawa
- Iwaki-Minato
- Mangokuura
- Kokufu-Tagajō
- Kozurushinden
- Taishidō
- Tōshōgū
- Kitayama
- Tōhokufukushidaimae
- Kunimi
- Kuzuoka
- Yūbikan
- Tendō-Minami
- Kōriyamatomita
- Takasakitonyamachi
- Onogami-Onsen
- Maebashi-Ōshima
- Hitachino-Ushiku
- Tamado
- Yamato
- Toro
- Saitama-Shintoshin
- Kita-Ageo
- Koshigaya-Laketown
- Yoshikawaminami
- Kita-Kashiwa
- Higashi-Matsudo
- Makuharitoyosuna
- Higashi-Koganei
- Nishifu
- Hachiōji-Minamino
- Kobuchi
- Naruse
- Tōkaichiba
- Kamoi
- Higashi-Totsuka
- Musashi-Kosugi
- Odasakae
- Aoyama
- Uchino-Nishigaoka
- Satsukino
- Suzurannosato
- Misato
- Imai
- Hirata

=== JR Tokai ===
- Aizuma
- Abekawa
- Aino
- Aimi
- Asahi
- Mikuriya
- Nagaizumi-Nameri
- Nishi-Okazaki
- Haruta
- Higashi-Shizuoka
- Noda-Shimmachi
- Toyodachō

=== JR West ===
- Himeji-Bessho
- Kōnan-Yamate
- Tachibana
- Rittō
- Minami-Kusatsu
- Seta
- Ono
- Emmachi
- Uzumasa
- Rokujizō
- JR Fujinomori
- Matsuiyamate
- JR Goidō
- Kitanagase
- Tōbu-shijō-mae
- Kure-Portopia
- Nishigawara
- Higashiyamakōen
- Ōmachi
- Akinagahama
- Nagaokakyō
- Tottoridaigakumae
- Kamisuge
- Shinkyū-Daigaku-mae
- Higashi-Onomichi
- Miyauchi-Kushido
- Meihō
- JR Nonoichi
- Hirokawa Beach
- Maezora
- Tamade
- Nakanohigashi
- Hesaka
- Ajina
- Kimmeiji
- Waki
- Kajikuri-Gōdaichi
- Shimamoto
- Harima-Katsuhara
- Motomachi

=== JR Kyushu ===
- Itoshimakōkō-mae
- Heisei
- Satsuma-Matsumoto
- Tomiai
- Hiroki
- Nishi-Kumamoto
- Shin-Tosu
- Kamimuragakuenmae

== Railways other than JR ==
- Itakura Tōyōdai-mae (板倉東洋大前駅, Tōbu Nikkō Line)
- Funabashi-Nichidaimae (船橋日大前駅, Toyo Rapid Railway Line)
- Arakawa-itchūmae (荒川一中前駅, Toden Arakawa Line)
- Shinonome (Tokyo Waterfront Area Rapid Transit Rinkai Line)
- Haruhino (Odakyū Tama Line)
- Nikkakagakumae (日華化学前駅, Echizen Railway Mikuni Awara Line)
- Yatsushima (八ツ島駅, Echizen Railway Mikuni Awara Line)
- Toriimoto (Ohmi Railway Main Line)
- Ōsaka-Kyōikudai-mae (大阪教育大前駅, Kintetsu Osaka Line)
- Wakayamadaigakumae (和歌山大学前駅, Nankai Main Line)
- Tanoura Otachimisaki Park (たのうら御立岬公園駅, Hisatsu Orange Railway)

== Closed stations that were opened by petitions ==
- Shiriuchi
- Tsugaru-Imabetsu
- Kamaya
- Toyogaoka
- Hiraishi
