= Shin-Fuji Station =

Shin-Fuji Station is the name of two train stations in Japan.

- Shin-Fuji Station (Hokkaido) - (新富士駅) in Hokkaidō
- Shin-Fuji Station (Shizuoka) - (新富士駅) in Shizuoka
