= Futomi Station =

Futomi Station may refer to:

- Futomi Station (Chiba) in Chiba, Japan
- Futomi Station (Hokkaido) in Hokkaido, Japan
