= CA54 =

CA54, CA-54, or CA 54 may refer to:

- Collagen, type IV, alpha 5, a human protein-coding gene
- Calcium-54, (Ca-54 or ^{54}Ca), an isotope of calcium
- California State Route 54, a state highway in California
- Anjō Station, a railway station in Anjō, Aichi Prefecture, Japan (station code: CA54)
