= ROYCE' Town Station =

Railway station in Tōbetsu, Hokkaido, Japan

G11-1 ROYCE' Town Station ロイズタウン駅
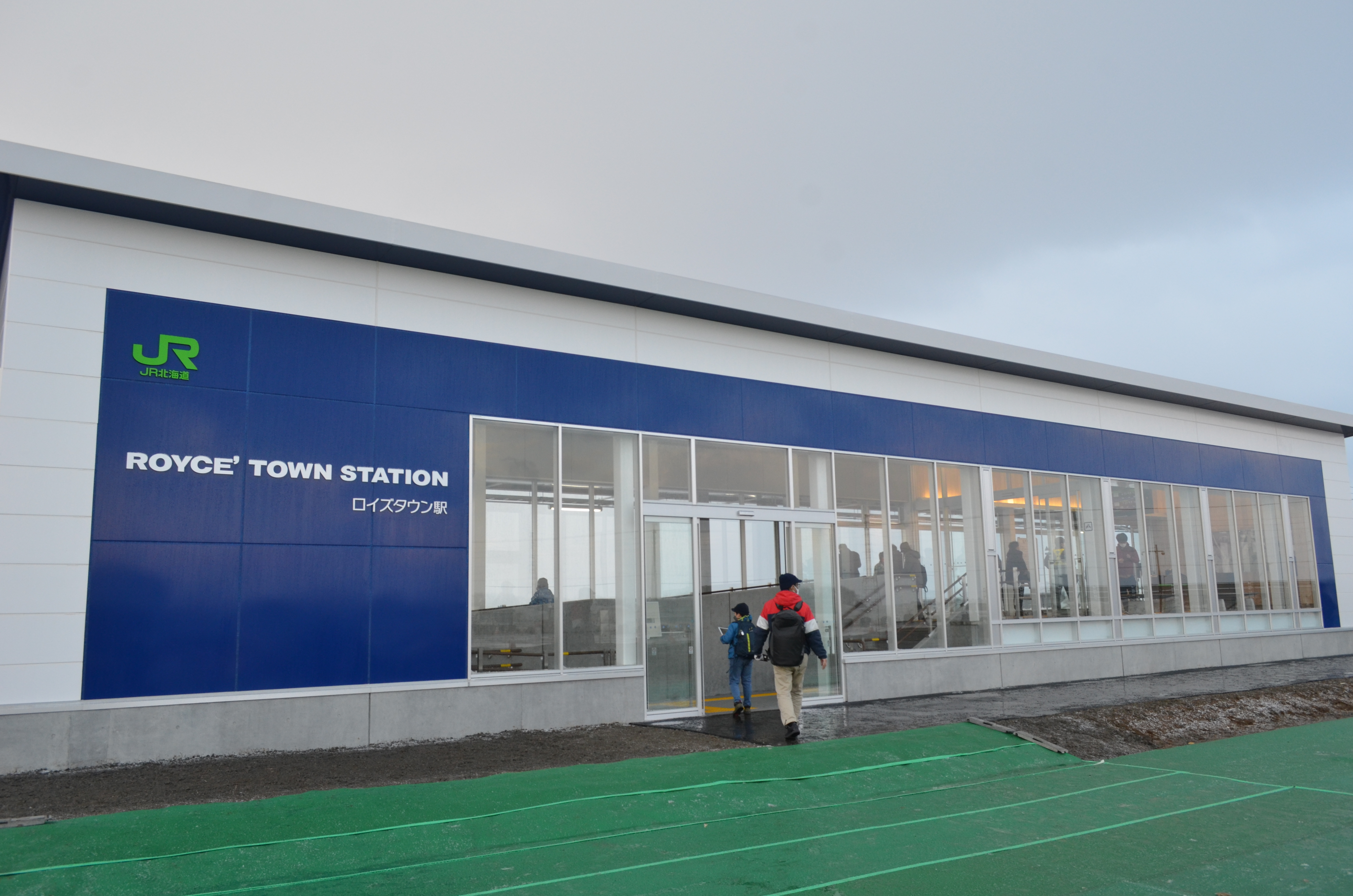
- Station building in March 2022

General information
- Location: 1225-9 Tōbetsubuto, Tōbetsu, Ishikari District; Hokkaido Prefecture; Japan
- Coordinates: 43°10′46.52″N 141°26′10.45″E
- Operator: JR Hokkaido
- Line: Sasshō Line
- Distance: 17.9 km (11.1 mi) from Sōen
- Platforms: 1 side platform
- Tracks: 1

Construction
- Structure type: At grade

Other information
- Status: Unstaffed
- Station code: G11-1
- Website: https://www.jrhokkaido.co.jp/

History
- Opened: 12 March 2022; 4 years ago

Services
Preceding station	JR Hokkaido	Following station
Ainosato-kōen G11 towards Sapporo	Sasshō Line	Futomi G12 towards Hokkaidō-Iryōdaigaku
Location
- Location within Hokkaido Location within Japan

ROYCE' Town Station (ロイズタウン駅) is an infill railway station on the Sasshō Line in Tōbetsu, Hokkaidō, Japan. The station is operated by the Hokkaido Railway Company (JR Hokkaido).

== Planning ==
The idea of building the station came about when the town of Tōbetsu and Royce', a chocolate manufacturing company, submitted a joint petition to JR Hokkaido, seeking to establish a new infill station. The station was planned to improve convenience for visitors to Royce's Futomi factory, which is located along the Sasshō Line, as well as to attract private investments to develop housing sites and visitor facilities in the area surrounding the station. Royce' paid ¥930 million for the construction of the station building and platform, while the town of Tōbetsu would build the station square at an estimated cost of ¥546 million.

=== Construction ===
Construction of the station began in the spring of 2021, and the station itself opened on 12 March 2022. While most trains stop at the station, a minority of trains are timetabled to skip the station. Following the opening of the station, approximately 500 people were expected to use the station daily, according to JR Hokkaido. Construction of the station square started later in June 2021; while the station square was originally meant to open in tandem with the railway station, a geological survey revealed that the site was on soft ground. Thus, the opening of the station square was delayed, and was completed in March 2023.

== Station structure ==
The station consists of a station building as well as a single side platform. The exterior of the station building is painted blue, derived from the brand colour of Royce', while the interior is made of birch, a tree found in the town of Tōbetsu.

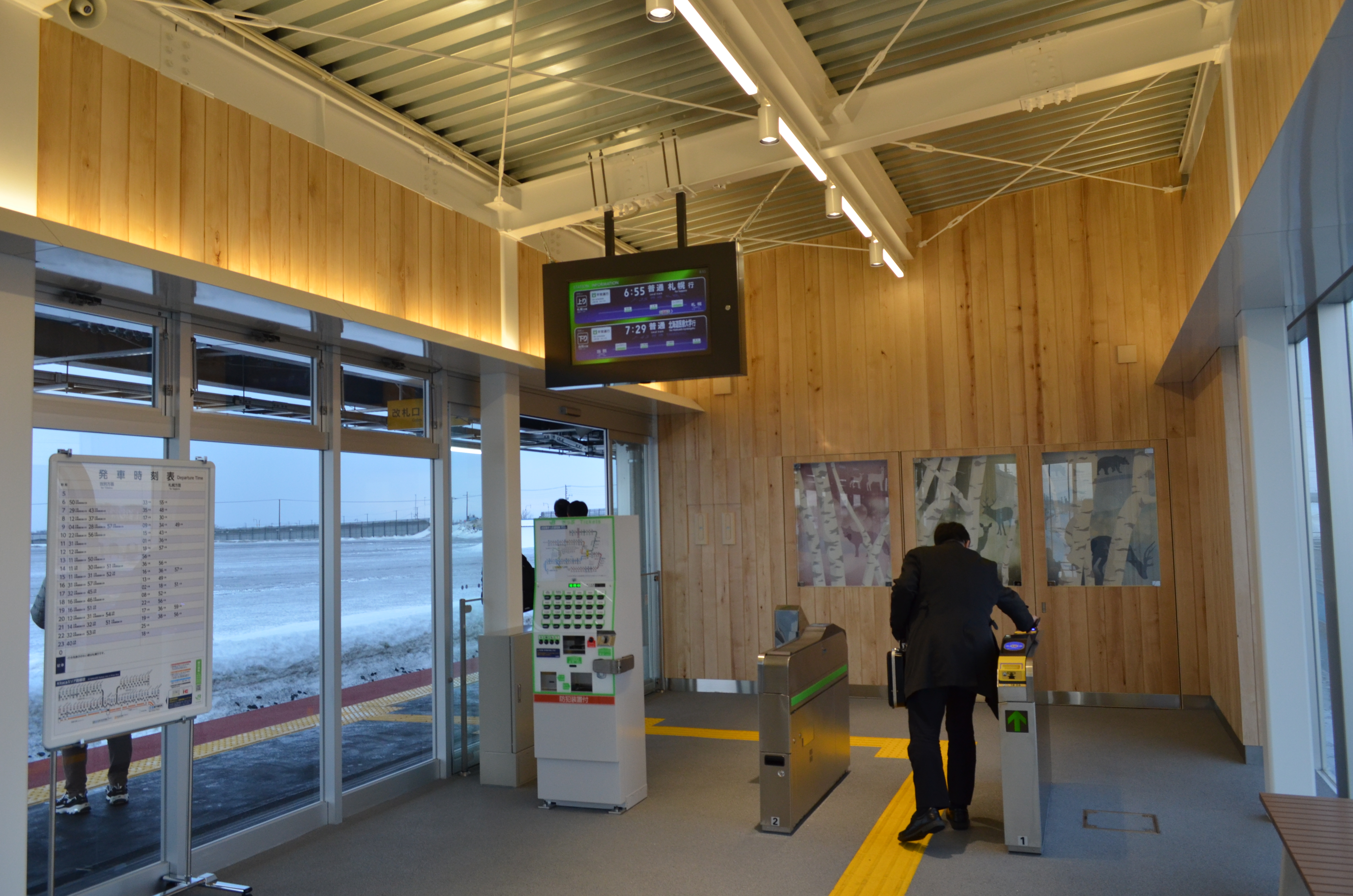
Ticket gate

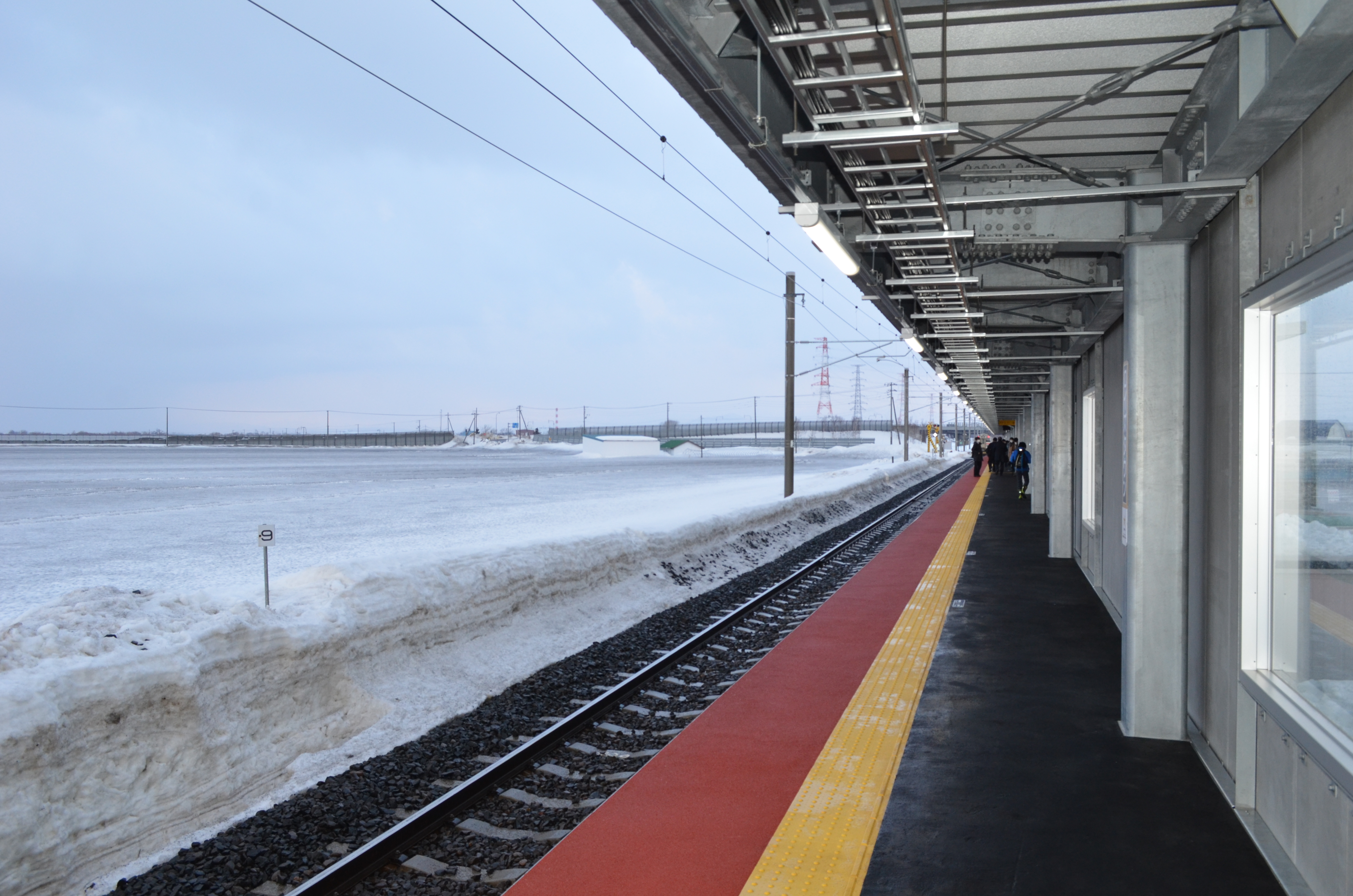
Platform

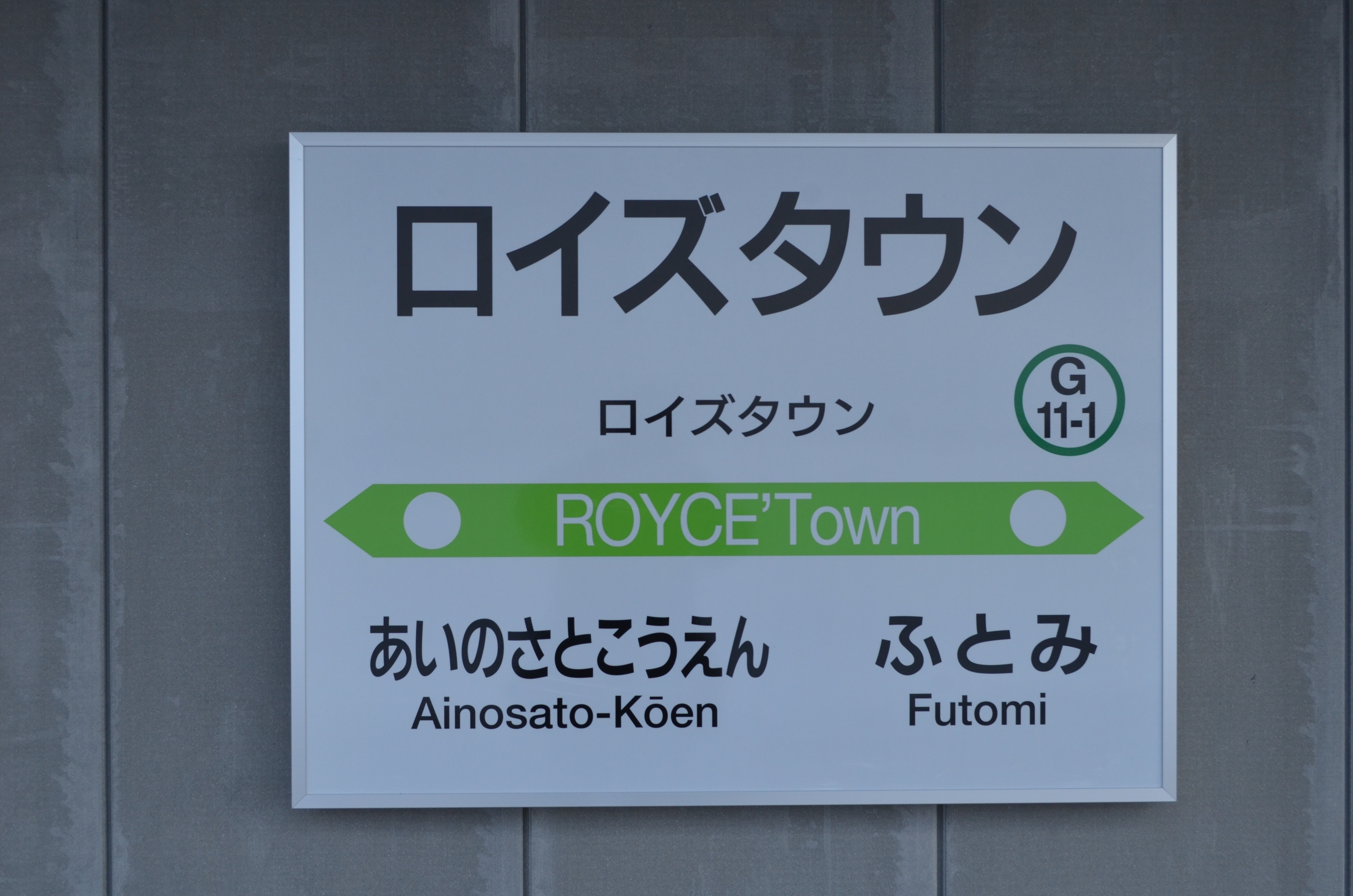
Station sign
