= Higashi-Kariya Station =

Railway station in Kariya, Aichi Prefecture, Japan

CA56 Higashi-Kariya Station 東刈谷駅
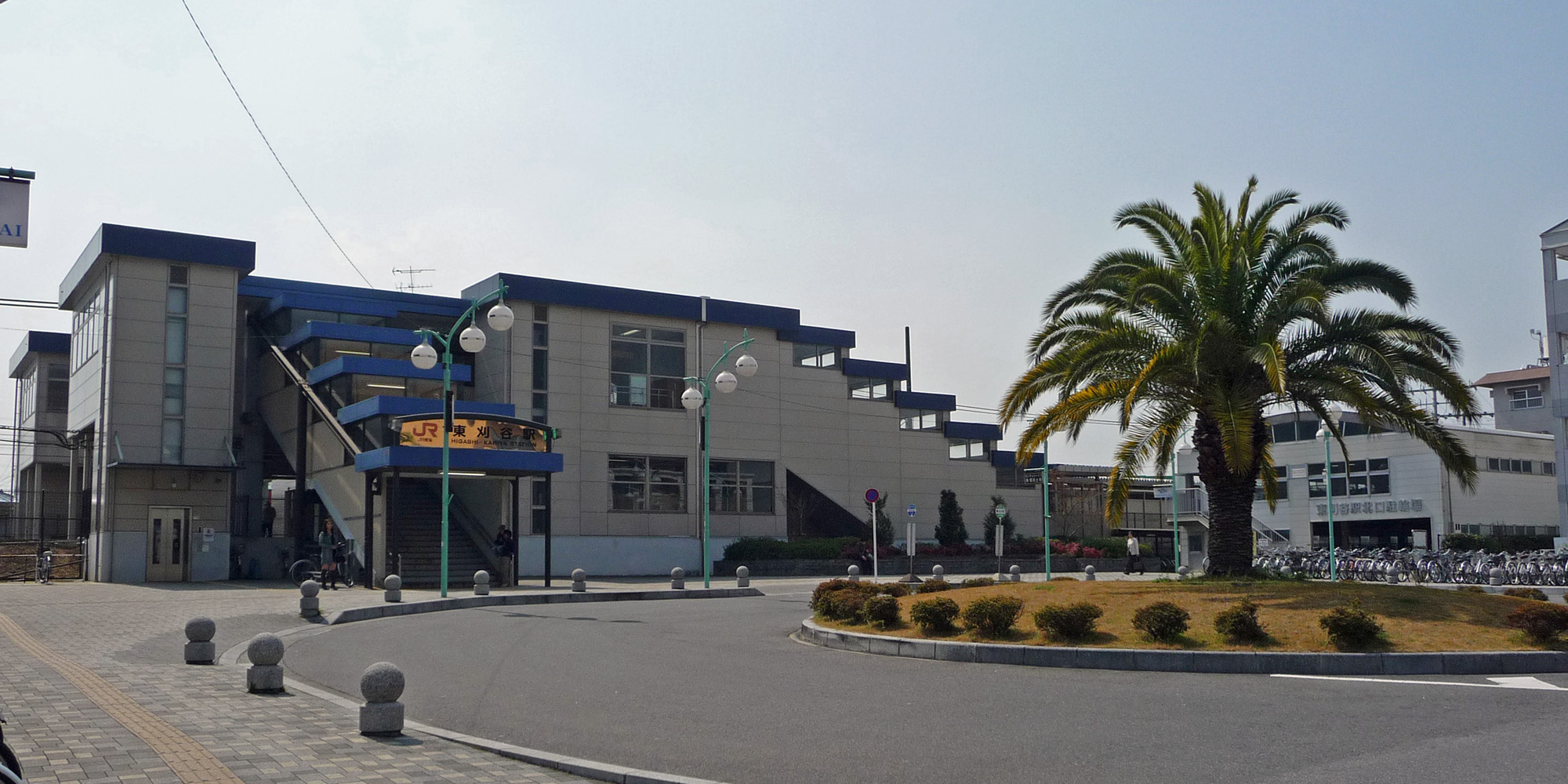
- Higashi-Kariya Station North Exit, March 2009

General information
- Location: 1-35 Higashikariya-cho, Kariya-shi, Aichi-ken 448-080; Japan
- Coordinates: 34.9776°N 137.0436°E
- Operator: JR Central
- Line: Tokaido Main Line
- Distance: 338.1 kilometers from Tokyo
- Platforms: 2 side platforms

Other information
- Status: Staffed
- Station code: CA56

History
- Opened: December 24, 1966

Passengers
- 2023–2024: 9,171 daily
Location
- Location within Aichi Prefecture Location within Japan

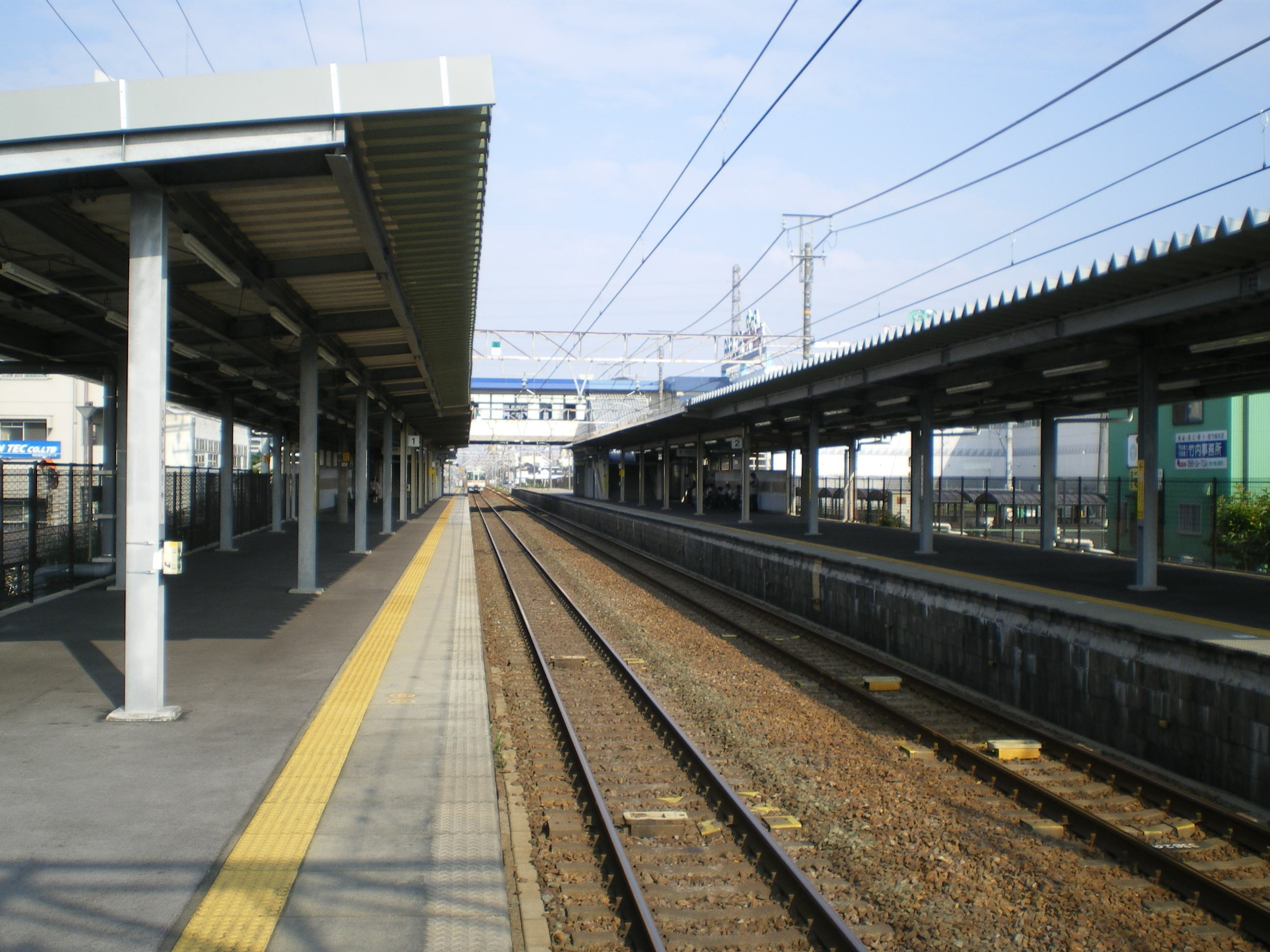
Higashi-Kariya Station platforms

Higashi-Kariya Station (東刈谷駅, Higashi-Kariya-eki) is a railway station in the city of Kariya, Aichi Prefecture, Japan, operated by Central Japan Railway Company (JR Tōkai).

== Lines ==
Higashi-Kariya Station is served by the Tōkaidō Main Line, and is located 338.1 kilometers from the starting point of the line at Tokyo Station.

== Station layout ==
The station has two opposed side platforms connected by a footbridge. The station building has automated ticket machines, TOICA automated turnstiles and is staffed.

=== Platforms ===
1	■ Tōkaidō Main Line	For Okazaki and Toyohashi
2	■ Tōkaidō Main Line	For Nagoya and Ōgaki

== Adjacent stations ==
«	Service	»
Tōkaidō Main Line
Special Rapid: Does not stop at this station
New Rapid: Does not stop at this station
Rapid: Does not stop at this station
Sectional Rapid: Does not stop at this station
Mikawa-Anjō	Local	Noda-Shinmachi

== Station history ==
Higashi-Kariya Station opened on December 24, 1966 as a passenger station of the Japanese National Railways (JNR). With the privatization and dissolution of JNR on April 1, 1987, the station came under the control of the Central Japan Railway Company.

Station numbering was introduced to the section of the Tōkaidō Line operated JR Central in March 2018; Higashi-Kariya Station was assigned station number CA56.

== Passenger statistics ==
In fiscal 2017, the station was used by an average of 5468 passengers daily.

== Surrounding area ==
- Japan National Route 23
- Chiryu Minami Junior High School

== See also ==
- List of railway stations in Japan
