= Yokoiso Station =

Railway station in Fukaura, Aomori Prefecture, Japan

Yokoiso Station 横磯駅
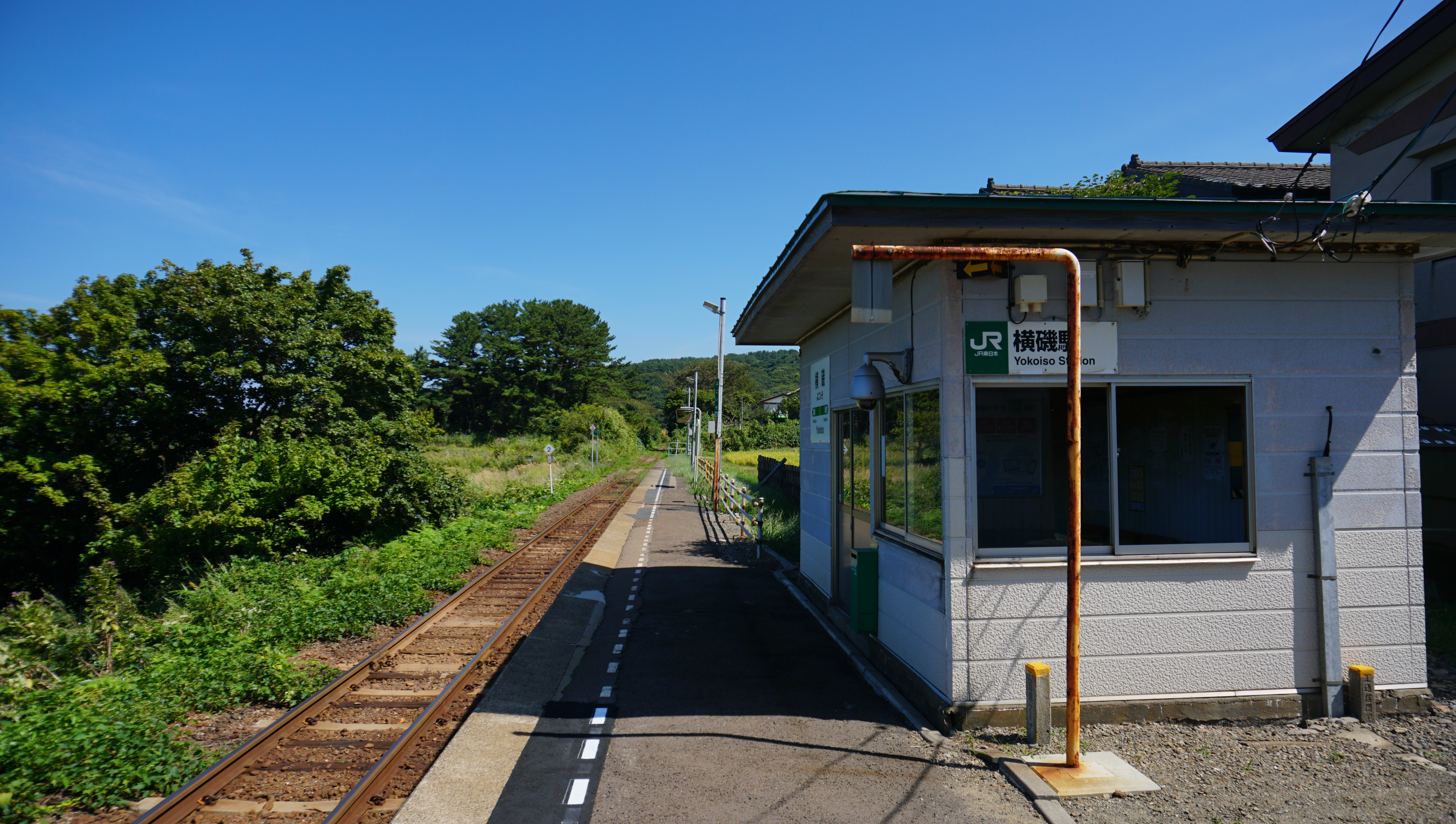
- Yokoiso Station in September 2019

General information
- Location: Yokoiso Shimo-Okazaki 99, Fukaura-machi, Nishitsugaru-gun, Aomori-ken 038-2325; Japan
- Coordinates: 40°37′47.51″N 139°53′27.59″E
- Operator: JR East
- Line: ■ Gonō Line
- Distance: 61.4 km from Higashi-Noshiro
- Platforms: 1 side platform

Other information
- Status: Unstaffed
- Website: Official website (in Japanese)

History
- Opened: December 25, 1954

Services
Preceding station	JR East	Following station
Henashi towards Higashi-Noshiro	Gonō Line Local	Fukaura towards Hirosaki
Location
- Location within Japan

Yokoiso Station (横磯駅, Yokoiso-eki) is a railway station located in the town of Fukaura, Aomori Prefecture Japan, operated by the East Japan Railway Company (JR East).

== Lines ==
Yokoiso Station is a station on the Gonō Line, and is located 39.9 kilometers from the terminus of the line at Higashi-Noshiro.

== Station layout ==
Yokoiso Station has one ground-level side platform serving a single bi-directional track. The station is unattended, and has no station building, but only a small waiting room on the platform. The station is managed from Goshogawara Station.

== History ==
Yokoizo Station was opened on December 25, 1954 as a station on the Japan National Railways (JNR). With the privatization of the JNR on April 1, 1987, it came under the operational control of JR East.

== Surrounding area ==
- National Route 101
- Yokoiso fishing port

== See also ==
- List of railway stations in Japan
