= Shin-Otanoshike Station =

Railway station in Kushiro, Hokkaido, Japan

K51 Shin-Otanoshike Station 新大楽毛駅
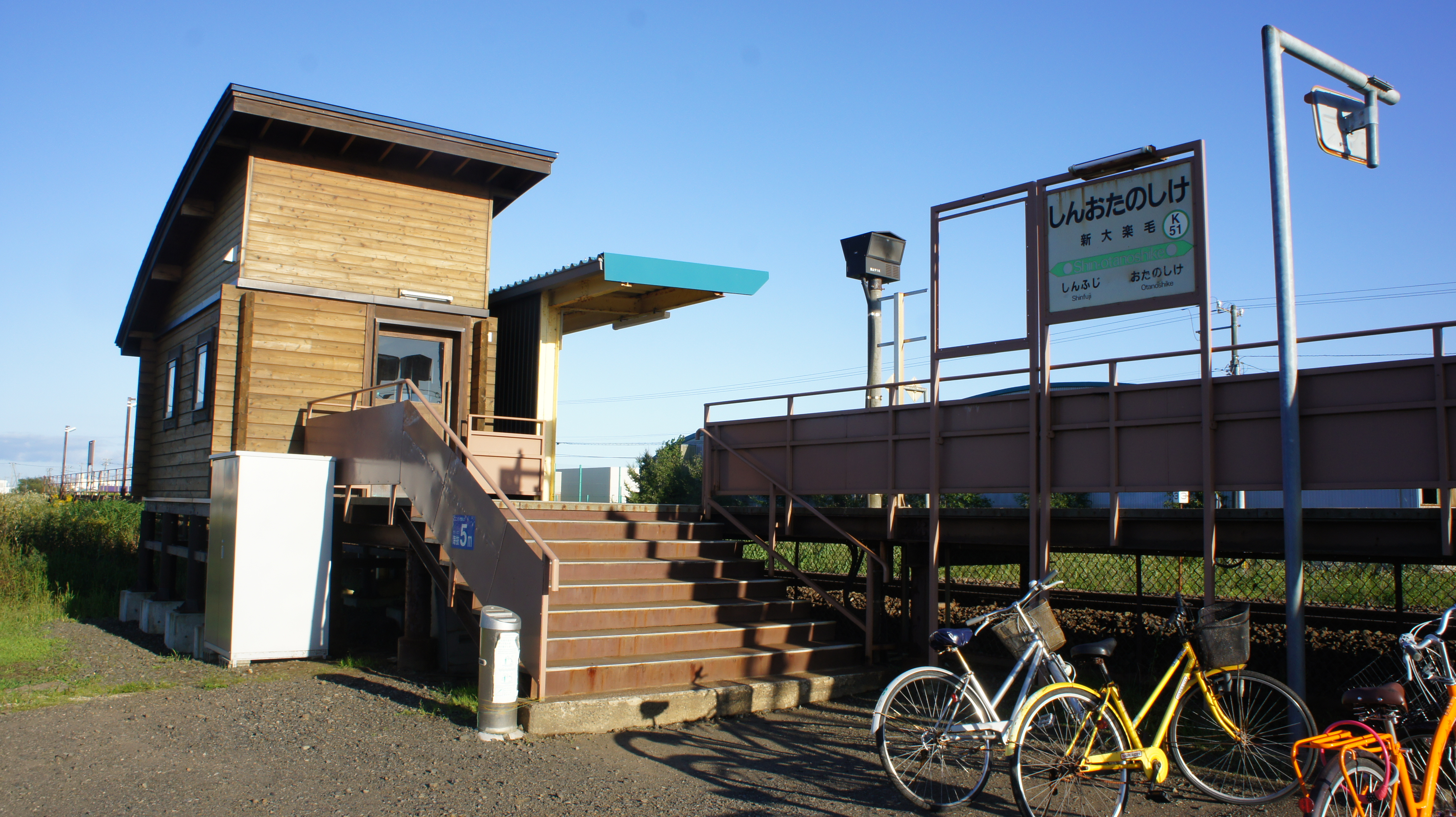
- Station building in September 2018

General information
- Location: 1-chōme-3 Otanoshikeminami, Kushiro, Hokkaido 084-0915; Japan
- Coordinates: 43°0′33.92″N 144°17′40.84″E
- System: regional rail
- Operator: JR Hokkaido
- Line: Nemuro Main Line
- Distance: 164.5 km from Shintoku
- Platforms: 1 side platform
- Tracks: 1

Other information
- Status: Unattended
- Station code: K51
- Website: Official website

History
- Opened: 3 November 1988; 37 years ago

Passengers
- FY2014: 20 daily

Services
Preceding station	JR Hokkaido	Following station
Otanoshike towards Takikawa	Nemuro Main Line Local	Shin-Fuji towards Nemuro
Location
- Location within Hokkaido Location within Japan

Shin-Otanoshike Station (新大楽毛駅, Shin-Otanoshike-eki) is a railway station located in the city of Kushiro, Hokkaidō, Japan. It is operated by JR Hokkaido.

== Lines ==
The station is served by the Nemuro Main Line, and lies 164.5 km from the starting point of the line at Shintoku .

== Layout ==
Shin-Otanoshike Station has one side platform. The station is unattended.

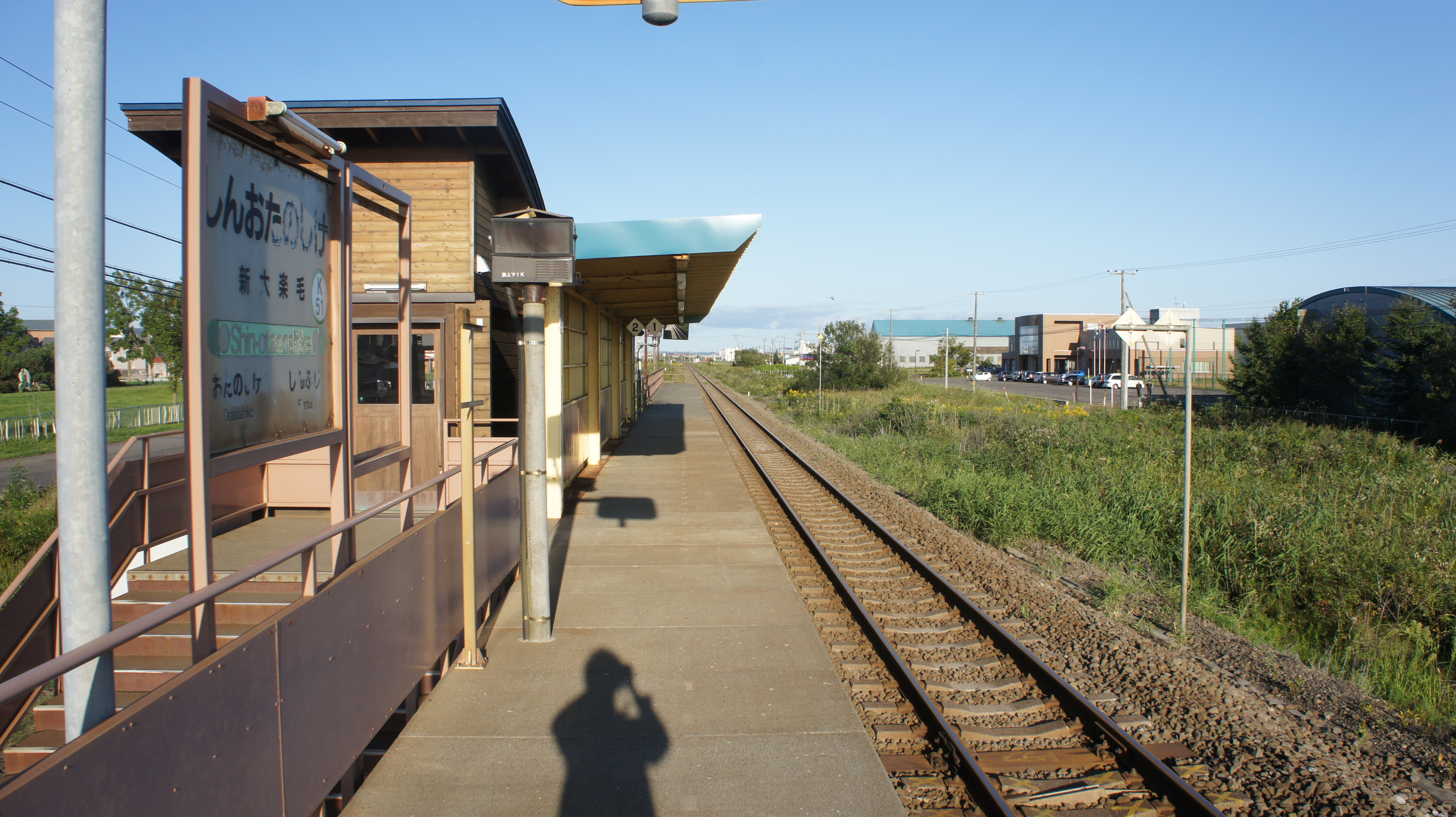
Platform

== History ==
The station opened on 3 November 1988 to accommodate the local Fuji Paper (→ Oji Paper) company housing, newly developed residential areas, and Hokkaido Kushiro Nishi High School (which closed in 2009 and became Hokkaido Kushiro Tsuruno Special Needs School in 2014). A waiting room was completed in 2013.

== Passenger statistics ==
In fiscal 2014, the station was used by an average of 20 passengers daily.

== Surrounding area ==
Originally an industrial area, the area has seen the expansion of suburban residential areas.

- Japan National Route 38
- Kushiro Driver's License Examination Center
- Hokkaido Prefectural Kushiro Technical College
- Arakawa Chemical Industry Kushiro Plant

== See also ==
- List of railway stations in Japan
