= Henashi Station =

Railway station in Fukaura, Aomori Prefecture, Japan

Henashi Station 艫作駅
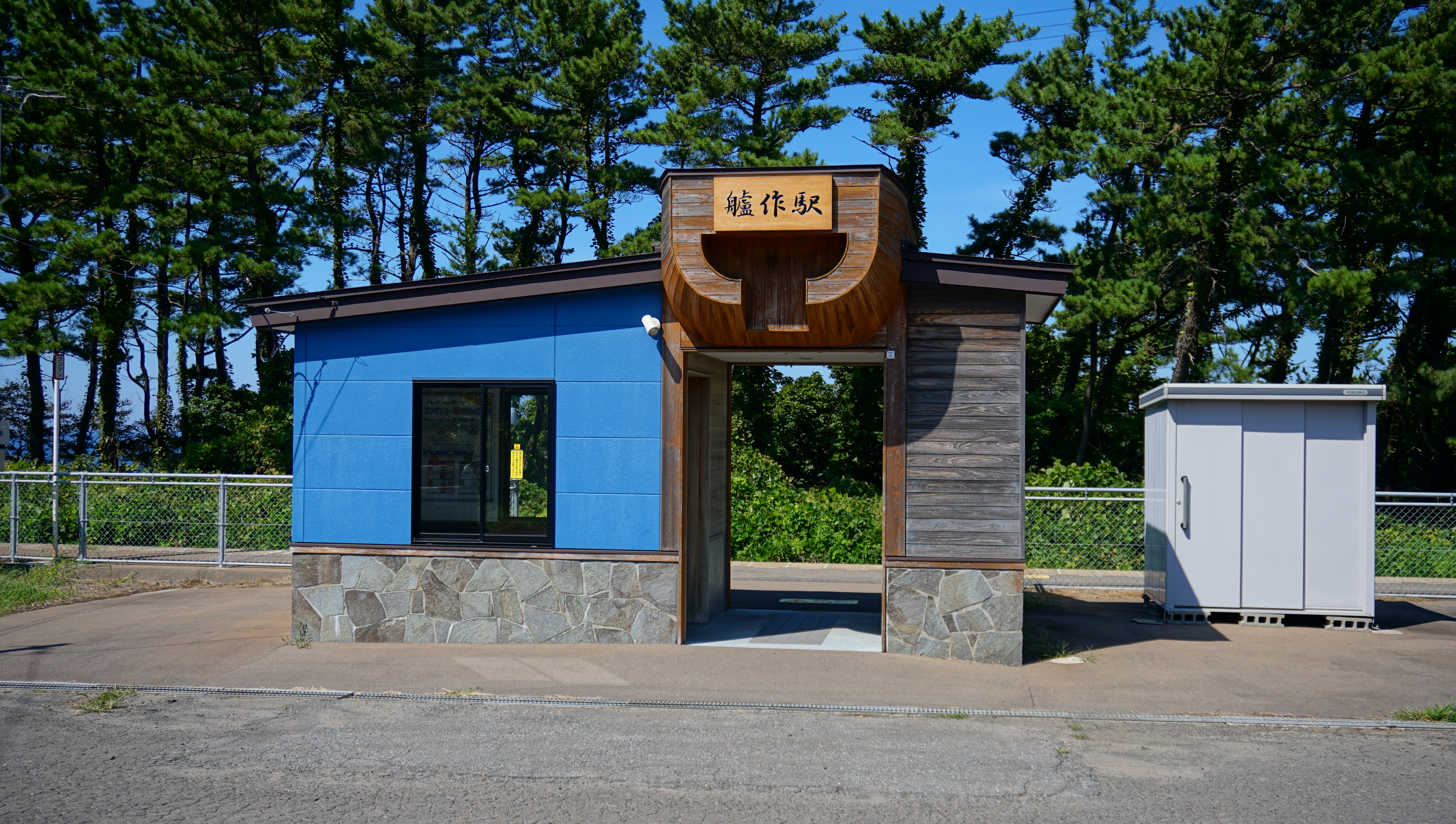
- Henashi Station in September 2019

General information
- Location: Henashi Shimo-Kiyotaki 124, Fukaura-machi, Nishitsugaru-gun Aomori-ken 038-2327; Japan
- Coordinates: 40°36′30.77″N 139°51′53.57″E
- Operator: JR East
- Line: ■ Gonō Line
- Distance: 57.9 km from Higashi-Noshiro
- Platforms: 1 side platform

Other information
- Status: Unstaffed
- Website: Official website (in Japanese)

History
- Opened: July 30, 1936

Services
Preceding station	JR East	Following station
WeSPa-Tsubakiyama towards Higashi-Noshiro	Gonō Line Local	Yokoiso towards Hirosaki
Location
- Location within Japan

Henashi Station (艫作駅, Henashi-eki) is a railway station located in the town of Fukaura, Aomori Prefecture Japan, operated by the East Japan Railway Company (JR East).

== Lines ==
Henashi Station is a station on the Gonō Line, and is located 39.9 kilometers from the terminus of the line at Higashi-Noshiro.

== Station layout ==
Henashi Station has one ground-level side platform serving a single bi-directional track. The station is unattended, and is managed from Goshogawara Station. The station was built with double opposed side platforms, but only a single side platform serving bidirectional traffic is currently in use.

== History ==
Henashi Station was opened on July 30, 1936, as a station on the Japanese Government Railways (JGR). With the privatization of the Japanese National Railways (successor of JGR) on April 1, 1987, it came under the operational control of JR East. A new station building was completed in November 2010.

== Surrounding area ==
- National Route 101
- Sea of Japan

== See also ==
- List of railway stations in Japan
