= Tōbetsu =

Tōbetsu 当別町
- Town
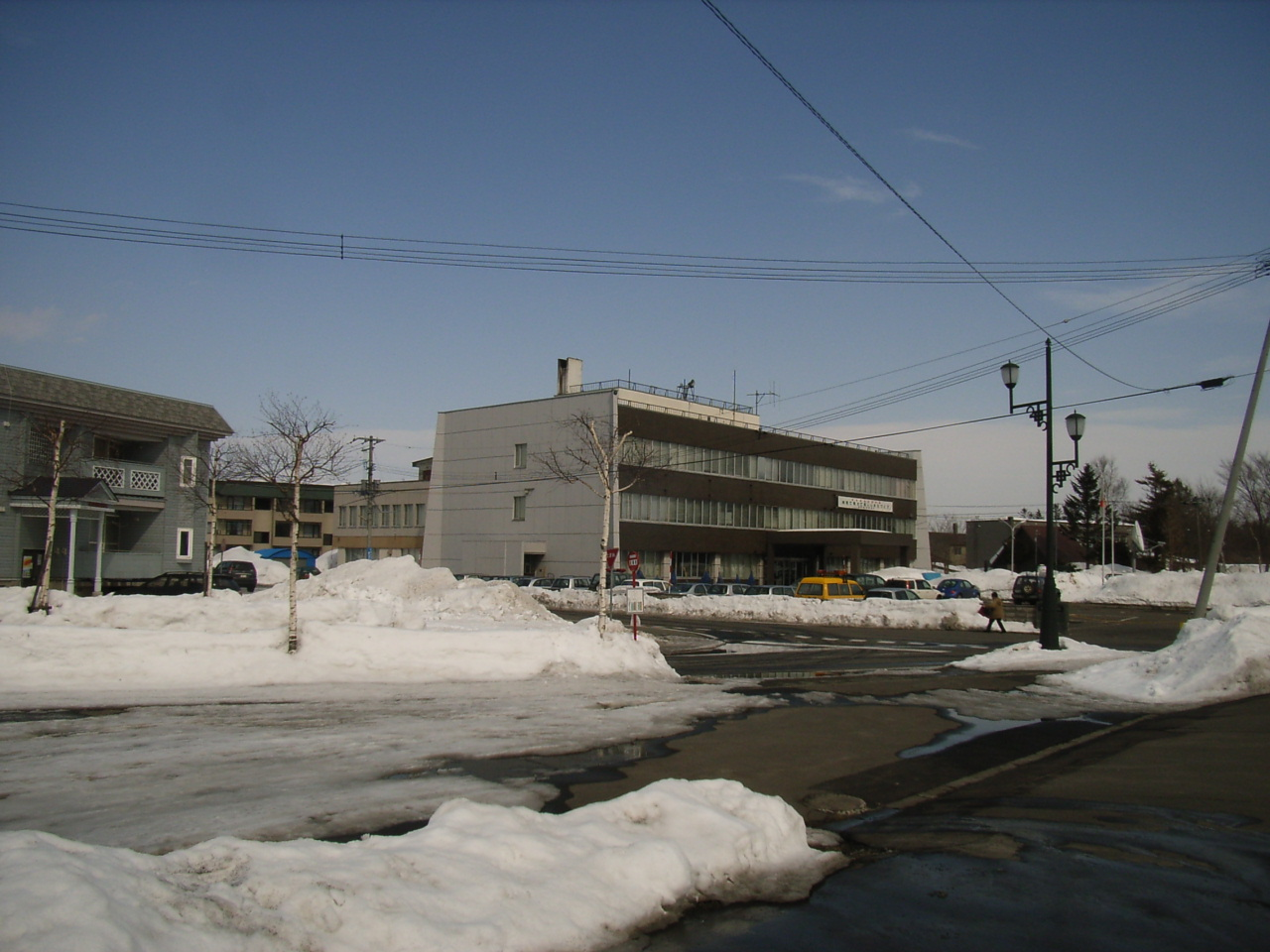
- Tōbetsu Town Office (March 2005)

- Flag Seal

- Location of Tōbetsu in Hokkaido (Ishikari Subprefecture)

- Location in Japan
- Coordinates: 43°13′N 141°31′E
- Country: Japan
- Region: Hokkaido
- Prefecture: Hokkaido (Ishikari Subprefecture)
- District: Ishikari

Government
  - Mayor: Masahiro Gotō

Area
  - Total: 422.86 km^{2} (163.27 sq mi)

Population (July 31, 2023)
  - Total: 15,347
  - Density: 36.293/km^{2} (93.999/sq mi)
- Time zone: UTC+09:00 (JST)
- City hall address: 58-9 Shirakabacho, Tobetsu, Hokkaido; 061-0292
- Website: town.tobetsu.hokkaido.jp
- Symbols
- Bird: Ural owl
- Flower: Gypsophila elegans
- Tree: Betula platyphylla

Tōbetsu (当別町, Tōbetsu-chō) is a town located in Ishikari, Hokkaido, Japan.

As of July 31, 2023 the town had an estimated population of 15,347, and a density of 36.3 persons per km^{2}. The total area is 422.86 km^{2}.

== Geography ==
Located in the north part of Ishikari Subprefecture of Hokkaido, the shape of the municipality is elongated from north to south. It overlaps with the catchment area of the Tōbetsu river approximately. Tōbetsu means "river from marsh" in Ainu language, and in Japanese, it is called "Tōbetsu Gawa (river)". Low mountains occupy the northern area of the municipality. The southern area is a part of the Ishikari Plains.

Sapporo, the largest city of Hokkaido, lies southwest of Tōbetsu. The large river of Ishikari divided Tōbetsu from Sapporo until 1934 when the Sasshō Line railroad connected the two cities. Several more bridges built in the latter half of the 20th century have reduced the traffic obstacle. Tōbetsu has produced rice and, recently, flowers. Residential buildings are increasing modestly because of their better access to Sapporo.

== History ==
- 1902 - Tōbetsu village was founded.
- 1947 - Tōbetsu village became Tōbetsu town.

== Education ==
=== University ===
- Health Sciences University of Hokkaido

=== High schools ===
- Hokkaido Tobetsu High School

== Transportation ==
- Sasshō Line: ROYCE' Town - Futomi - Tōbetsu - Hokkaidō-Iryōdaigaku

== Mascot ==
Tobenosuke, the town's mascot

Tōbetsu's mascot is Tobenosuke (とべのすけ) who is a 5-year-old Eurasian tree sparrow who lives in the forests of Tōbetsu. Not only is he is a Jidaigeki actor, but he also has samurai ancestors that belong to the Date clan. Despite his age, he will arm himself with a golden katana if anyone tries to mess with an innocent. He wears a kimono made from an annual baby's breath with an obe made from an Asian white birch and a green and gold kabuto with the kanji "tō" (当) painted on it as good luck. He also wears white war paint around his eyes to strike fear amongst his enemies. As a result, he is mistaken for a ural owl. His birthday is October 2. He is designed by Yasuka Arai.

== Sister cities ==
- Leksand, Dalarna, Sweden (since 1987)
- (Japan) Osaki, Miyagi (since 2000)
- (Japan) Uwajima, Ehime (since 2009)

== Notable people from Tōbetsu ==
- Tatsunori Arai, football player

== See also ==
- Sweden Hills
