= Kobuchi Station (Kanagawa) =

Railway station in Sagamihara, Kanagawa Prefecture, Japan

JH24 Kobuchi Station 古淵駅
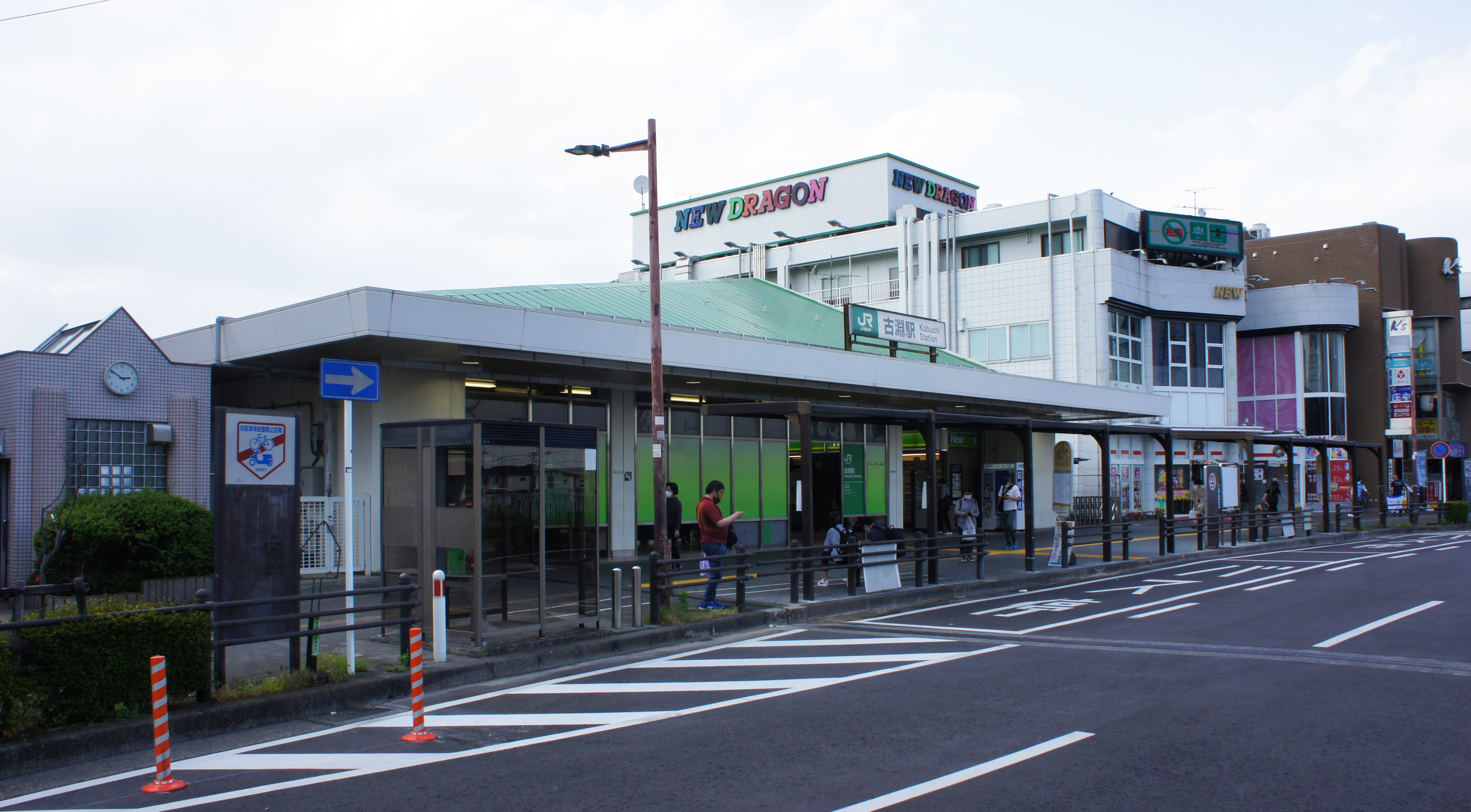
- Kobuchi Station, May 2021

General information
- Location: Kobuchi 2-19-1, Minami-ku, Sagamihara-shi, Kanagawa-ken 252-0344; Japan
- Coordinates: 35°33′21.5″N 139°25′9.3″E
- Operator: JR East
- Line: ■ Yokohama Line
- Distance: 25.7 km from Higashi-Kanagawa
- Platforms: 2 side platforms
- Connections: Bus stop

Other information
- Status: Staffed (Midori no Madoguchi)
- Station code: JH24
- Website: Official website

History
- Opened: 13 March 1988

Passengers
- FY2019: 23,002 daily (boarding passengers)

Services
Preceding station	JR East	Following station
Fuchinobe JH25 towards Hachiōji	Yokohama Line Local	Machida JH23 towards Higashi-Kanagawa or Ōfuna
Location
- Location within Kanagawa Prefecture Location within Japan

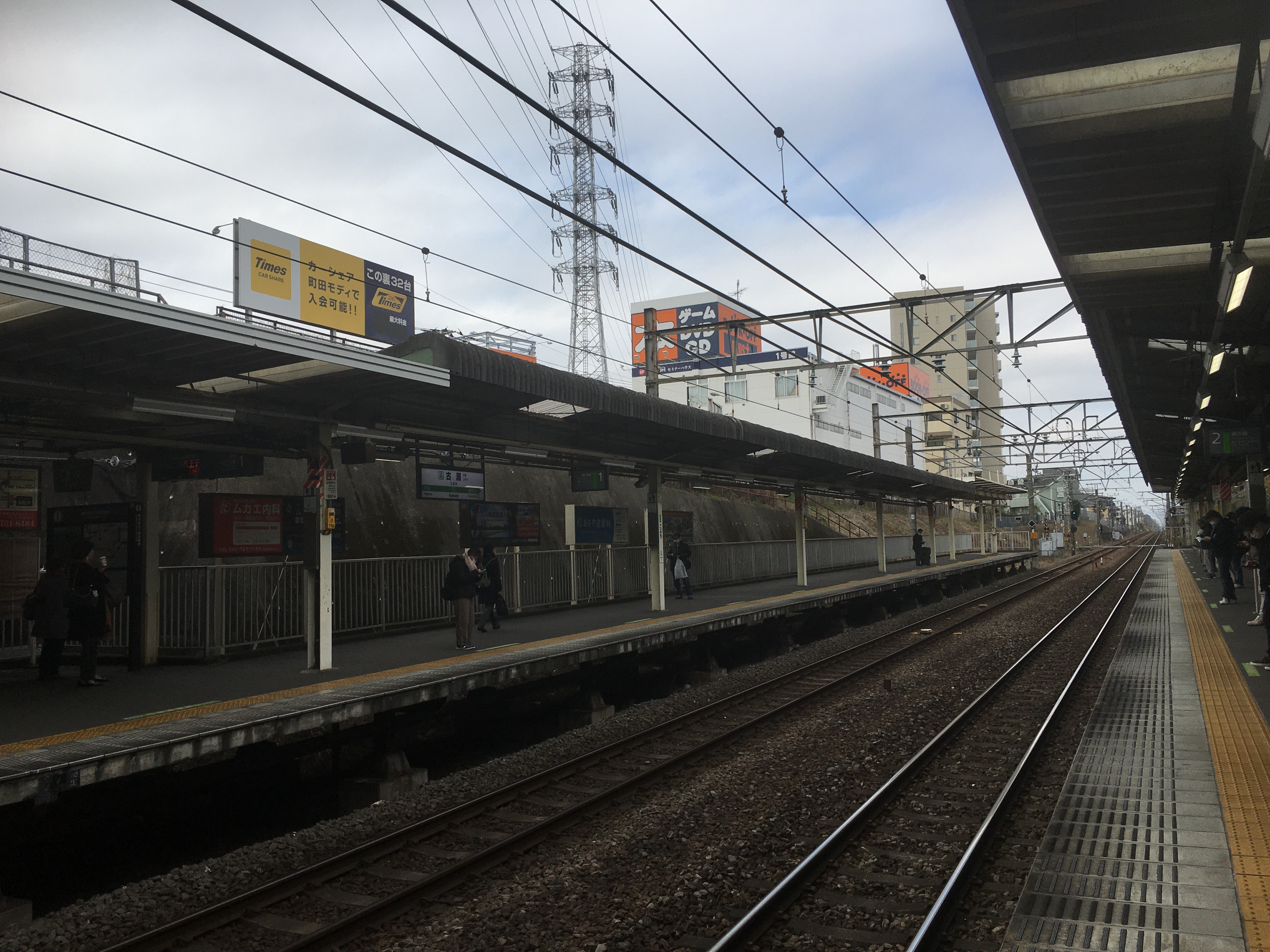
Platforms, 2020

Kobuchi Station (古淵駅, Kobuchi-eki) is a passenger railway station located in Minami-ku in the city of Sagamihara, Kanagawa Prefecture, Japan, and is operated by the East Japan Railway Company (JR East).

== Lines ==
Kobuchi Station is served by the Yokohama Line, and is located 25.7 kilometers from the terminus of the line at Higashi-Kanagawa.

== Station layout ==
Kobuchi Station has a two opposed side platforms serving two tracks, connected to the station building by a footbridge. The tracks are set in a cutting, and the elevated station building's exit is at ground level. The station has a Midori no Madoguchi staffed ticket office.

=== Platforms ===
1	Yokohama Line	for Sagamihara, Hashimoto, and Hachiōji
2	Yokohama Line	for Machida, Higashi-Kanagawa, Yokohama, Sakuragichō and Ōfuna

== History ==
Kobuchi Station was opened on 13 March 1988.

Station numbering was introduced on 20 August 2016 with Kobuchi being assigned station number JH24.

== Passenger statistics ==
In fiscal 2019, the station was used by an average of 23,002 passengers daily (boarding passengers only).

The passenger figures (boarding passengers only) for previous years are as shown below.

Fiscal year	daily average
2005	20,138
2010	21,398
2015	22,622

== Surrounding area ==
- Sagamihara City Ono Elementary School
- Sagamihara City Fuchinobe Higashi Elementary School
- Sagamihara City Onodai Central Elementary School
- Kitasato University Hospital

== See also ==
- List of railway stations in Japan
