= Futomi Station (Hokkaido) =

Railway station in Tōbetsu, Hokkaido, Japan

Coordinates: 43.1897°N 141.4491°E

Futomi Station 太美駅
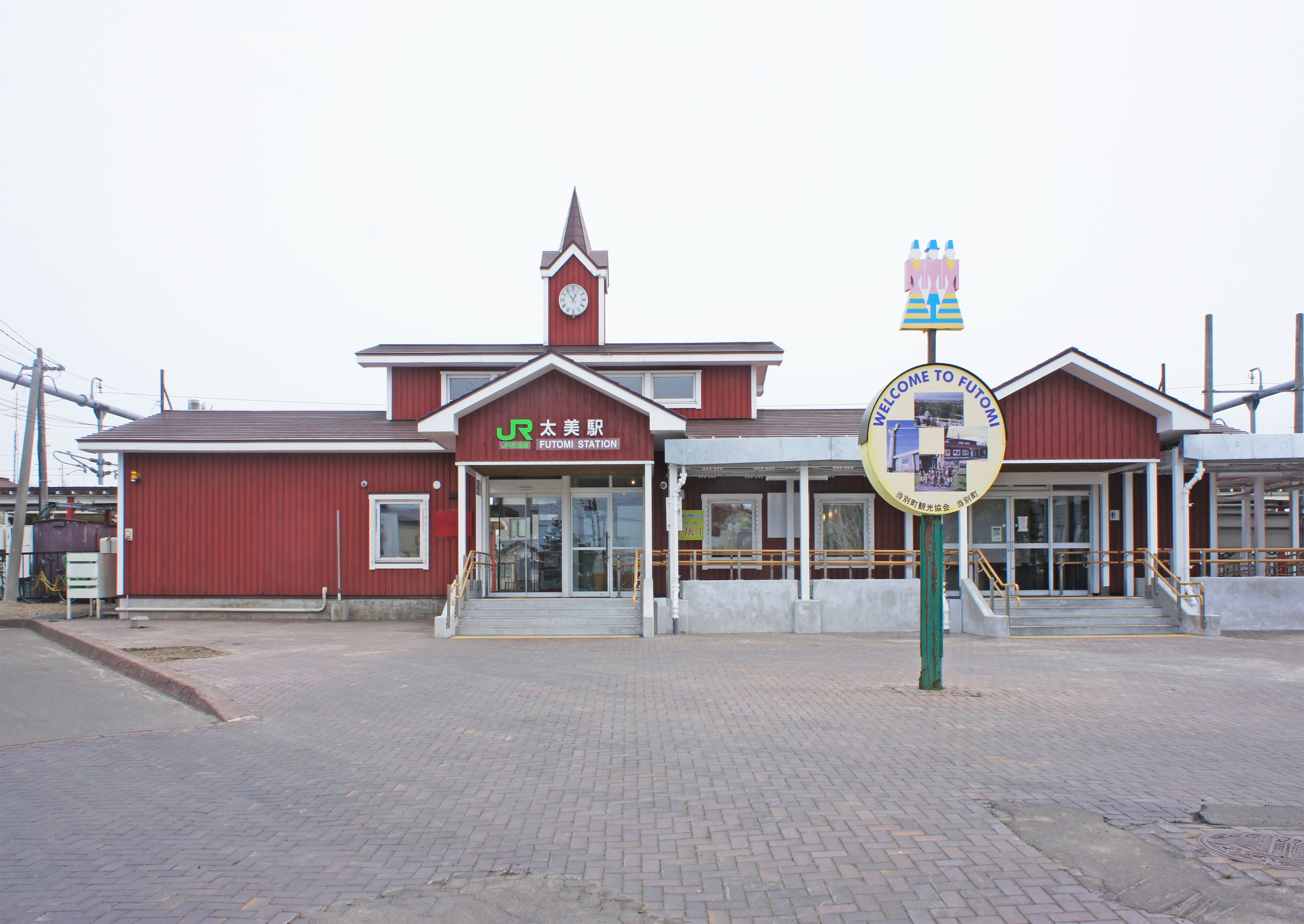
- Futomi Station, April 29th 2022

General information
- Location: Tōbetsu, Ishikari District; Hokkaido Prefecture; Japan
- Operator: JR Hokkaido
- Line: Sasshō Line
- Distance: 19.3 km (12.0 mi) from Sōen
- Platforms: 2 side platforms
- Tracks: 2

Construction
- Structure type: At grade

Other information
- Status: Unstaffed
- Station code: G12

History
- Opened: 20 November 1934; 91 years ago

Passengers
- FY1969: 730 daily

Services
Preceding station	JR Hokkaido	Following station
ROYCE' Town towards Sapporo	Sasshō Line	Tōbetsu towards Hokkaidō-Iryōdaigaku
Location

Futomi Station (太美駅, Futomi-eki) is a railway station on the Sasshō Line in Tōbetsu, Hokkaidō, Japan, operated by the Hokkaido Railway Company (JR Hokkaido). The station is numbered G12.

== Etymology ==
Its name is derived from where it is located -- 當別太 (Tōbetsubuto) and 美登江 (Bitoe), and since there had been a station with the same name enunciatively, it is added with 石狩 (Ishikari), a short-lived province located in Hokkaidō. In addition, the area's names Tōbetsubuto and Bitoe are respectively from Ainu to-pet-put, meaning "estuary rises in a lake", and pon-pit-o-i, meaning "a place with a lot of gravel". However, JR Hokkaido has changed its station name from "Ishikari-Futomi" to "Futomi" since 12 March 2022.

== Lines ==
Futomi Station is served by the Sasshō Line (Gakuen Toshi Line) from Sapporo to Hokkaidō-Iryōdaigaku.

== Station layout ==
The station has two side platforms serving two tracks on the otherwise single-track section of the line east of Ainosato-Kyōikudai Station. The station has automated ticket machines and Kitaca card readers. The station is unattended.

== History ==
Ishikari-Futomi Station opened on 20 November 1934.

Electric services commenced from 1 June 2012, following electrification of the line between Sapporo and Hokkaidō-Iryōdaigaku.
