= Anjō Station =

Railway station in Anjō, Aichi Prefecture, Japan

CA54 Anjō Station 安城駅
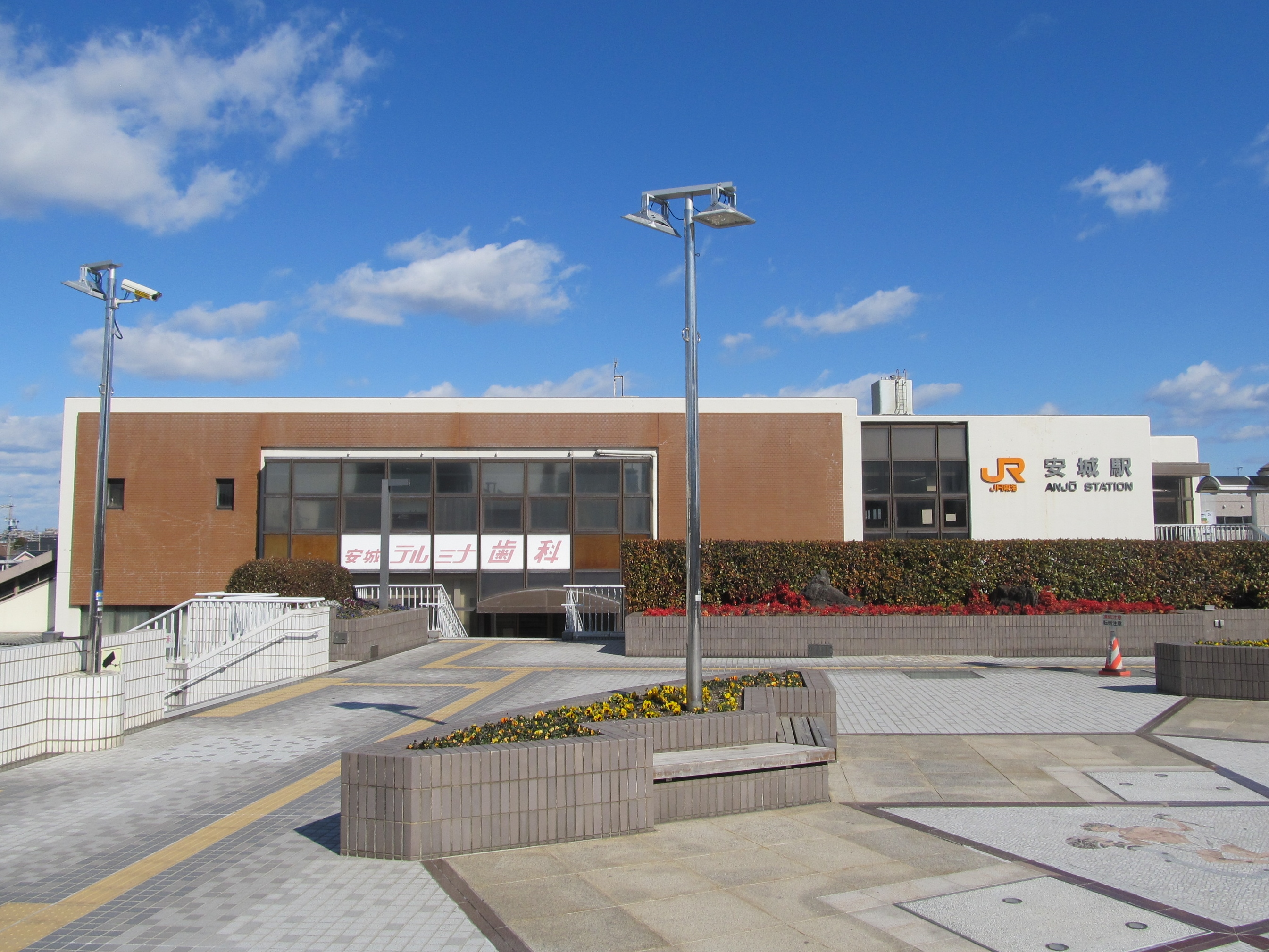
- Anjō Station in 2019

General information
- Location: Miyuki-Honmachi 1-1, Anjō-shi, Aichi-ken 446-0032; Japan
- Coordinates: 34.9602°N 137.0872°E
- Operator: JR Central
- Line: Tokaido Main Line
- Distance: 333.7 kilometers from Tokyo
- Platforms: 1 island + 2 side platforms

Other information
- Status: Staffed
- Station code: CA54
- Website: Official website

History
- Opened: 16 June 1891

Passengers
- 2023–2024: 21,126 daily
Location
- Location within Aichi Prefecture Location within Japan

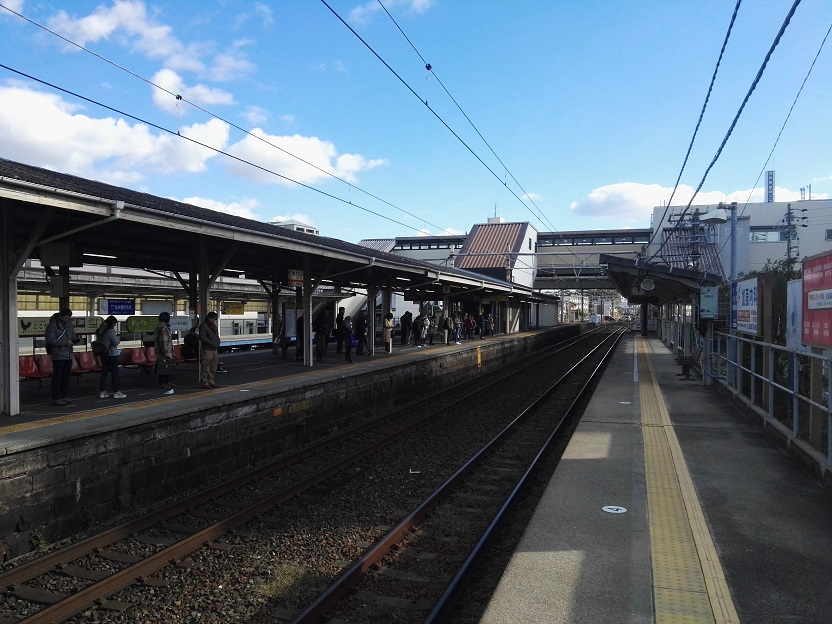
Platforms

Anjō Station (安城駅, Anjō-eki) is a railway station in the city of Anjō, Aichi Prefecture, Japan, operated by Central Japan Railway Company (JR Tōkai).

== Lines ==
Anjō Station is served by the Tōkaidō Main Line, and is located 333.7 kilometers from the starting point of the line at Tokyo Station.

== Station layout ==
The station has an island platform and two side platforms serving four tracks connected by a footbridge; however, only tracks 2 and 3 on the island platform are in normal operations. Track 1 is used for chartered and peak hour services, and use of track four was completely discontinued in 2010. The elevated station building has automated ticket machines, TOICA automated turnstiles and a staffed ticket office.

=== Platforms ===
Track diagram

1	■ Tōkaidō Main Line	for Nagoya, Ōgaki
2	■ Tōkaidō Main Line	for Okazaki, Toyohashi
3	■ Tōkaidō Main Line	for Okazaki, Toyohashi
4	■ Tōkaidō Main Line	not in service

== Adjacent stations ==
«	Service	»
Central Japan Railway Company
Tōkaidō Main Line
Okazaki	Special Rapid	Kariya
Okazaki	New Rapid	Kariya
Okazaki	Rapid	Kariya
Okazaki	Sectional Rapid	Kariya
Nishi-Okazaki	Local	Mikawa-Anjō

== Station history ==
Anjō Station was opened 16 June 1891 when the section of the Japanese Government Railways (JGR) line connecting Okazaki with Kariya was completed. This line was named Tōkaidō Line in 1895, and the Tōkaidō Main Line in 1909. An all-freight spur line operated by the privately held Hekinan Electric Railway connected Anjō to Hekinan in 1939 and began passenger operations from March 1951, but was discontinued in 1961. In October 1980, the JNR discontinued all freight services to Anjō Station. With the privatization and dissolution of the JNR on 1 April 1987, the station came under the control of the Central Japan Railway Company. At that time, an additional side platform was constructed.

Station numbering was introduced to the section of the Tōkaidō Line operated JR Central in March 2018; Anjō Station was assigned station number CA54.

== Passenger statistics ==
In fiscal 2017, the station was used by an average of 11,619 passengers daily (boarding passengers only).

== Surrounding area ==
- Anjō city hall
- Hekikai Shinkin Bank head office

== See also ==
- List of railway stations in Japan
