= Futomi Station (Chiba) =

Railway station in Kamogawa, Chiba Prefecture, Japan

Futomi Station 太海駅
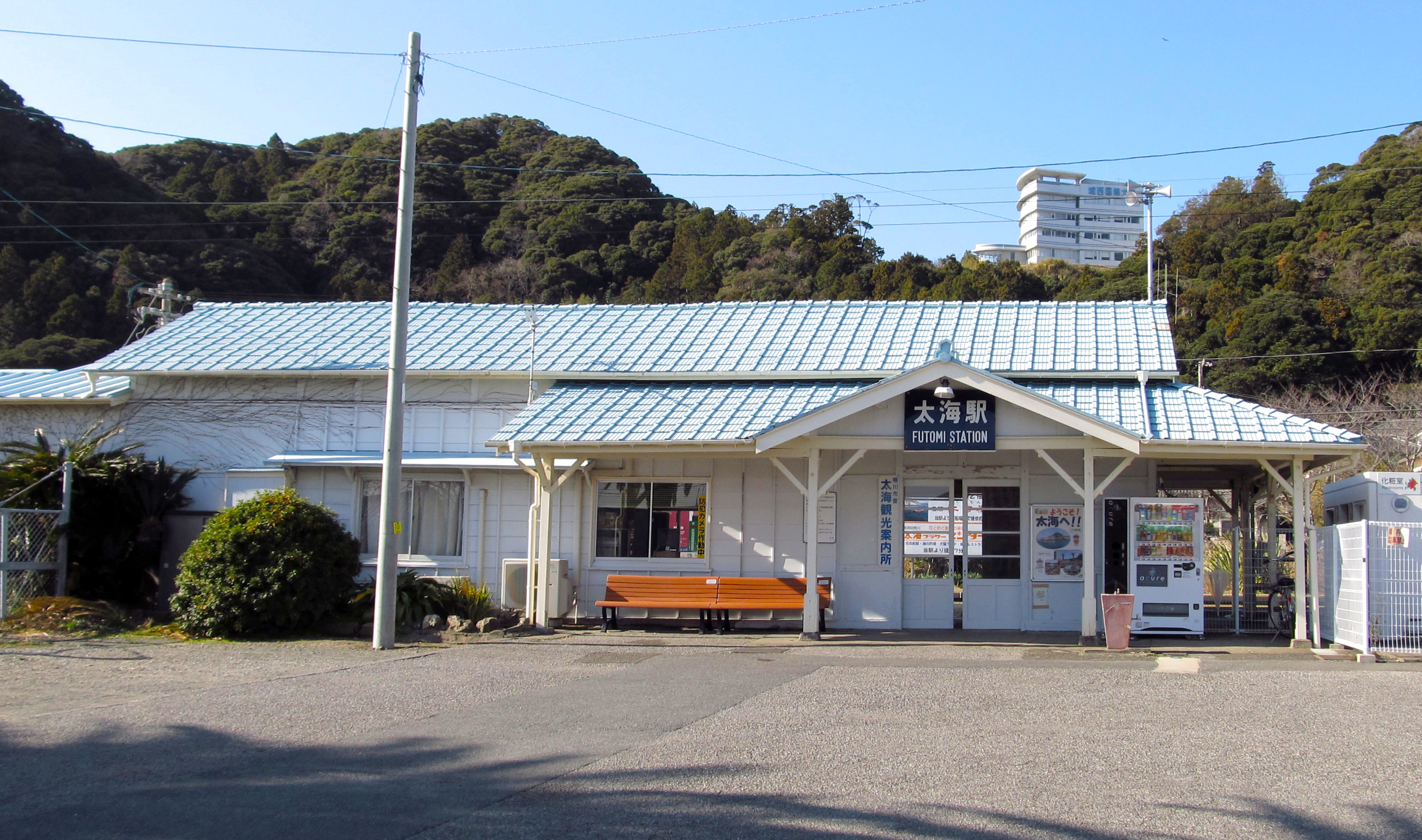
- Futomi Station in January 2014

General information
- Location: Futomi, Kamogawa-shi, Chiba-ken 299-2862; Japan
- Coordinates: 35°4′53.19″N 140°5′46.5″E
- Operator: JR East
- Line: ■ Uchibō Line
- Distance: 116.0 km from Soga
- Platforms: 2 side platforms

Other information
- Status: Unstaffed
- Website: Official website

History
- Opened: July 25, 1924

Passengers
- FY2018: 63

Services
Preceding station	JR East	Following station
Emi towards Soga or Chiba	Uchibō Line Local	Awa-Kamogawa Terminus
Location
- Location within Chiba Prefecture Location within Japan

Futomi Station (太海駅, Futomi-eki) is a passenger railway station in the city of Kamogawa, Chiba Prefecture, Japan, operated by the East Japan Railway Company (JR East).

== Lines ==
Futomi Station is served by the Uchibo Line, and is located 116.0 kilometers from the terminus of the Uchibō Line at Soga Station.

== Station layout ==
Futomi Station has two opposed side platforms serving two tracks. The station is unattended.

=== Platforms ===
1	■ Uchibō Line	For Chiba, Kimitsu, Tateyama, Soga
2	■ Uchibō Line	For Awa-Kamogawa

== History ==
Futomi Station was opened on July 25, 1924. The station was absorbed into the JR East network upon the privatization of the Japan National Railways (JNR) on April 1, 1987.

== Passenger statistics ==
In fiscal 2018, the station was used by an average of 63 passengers daily (boarding passengers only).

== Surrounding area ==
- Niemonjima
- National Route 128

== See also ==
- List of railway stations in Japan
- Ishikari-Futomi Station, a railway station on the Sasshō Line in Hokkaidō.
