= Nishi-Okazaki Station =

Railway station in Okazaki, Aichi Prefecture, Japan

CA53 Nishi-Okazaki Station 西岡崎駅
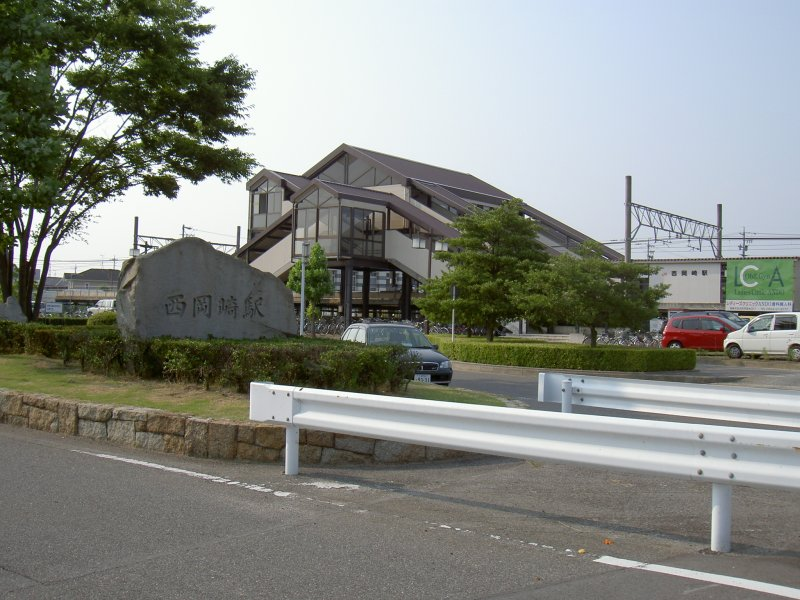
- Nishi-Okazaki Station south exit, June 2005

General information
- Location: Kitaura-48 Shōwachō, Okazaki-shi, Aichi-ken 444-0938; Japan
- Coordinates: 34.9465°N 137.1233°E
- Operator: JR Central
- Line: Tokaido Main Line
- Distance: 330.1 kilometers from Tokyo
- Platforms: 2 side platforms

Other information
- Status: Staffed
- Station code: CA53

History
- Opened: March 13, 1988

Passengers
- 2023–2024: 3,393 daily
Location
- Location within Aichi Prefecture Location within Japan

Nishi-Okazaki Station (西岡崎駅, Nishi-Okazaki-eki) is a railway station in the city of Okazaki, Aichi Prefecture, Japan, operated by Central Japan Railway Company (JR Tōkai).

== Lines ==
Nishi-Okazaki Station is served by the Tōkaidō Main Line, and is located 330.1 kilometers from the starting point of the line at Tokyo Station.

== Station layout ==
The station has two opposed side platforms, with an elevated station building built at a right angle above the tracks and platforms.. The station building has automated ticket machines, TOICA automated turnstiles and is staffed.

=== Platforms ===
1	■ Tōkaidō Main Line	For Nagoya and Ōgaki
2	■ Tōkaidō Main Line	For Okazaki and Toyohashi

== Adjacent stations ==
«	Service	»
Tōkaidō Main Line
Special Rapid: Does not stop at this station
New Rapid: Does not stop at this station
Rapid: Does not stop at this station
Sectional Rapid: Does not stop at this station
Okazaki	Local	Anjō

== Station history ==
Nishi-Okazaki Station was established as a passenger train station on March 13, 1988. Automated turnstiles using the TOICA IC Card system came into operation from November 25, 2006.

Station numbering was introduced to the section of the Tōkaidō Line operated JR Central in March 2018; Nishi-Okazaki Station was assigned station number CA53.

== Passenger statistics ==
In fiscal 2017, the station was used by an average of 1983 passengers daily.

== Surrounding area ==
- Yasaku Minami Elementary School

== See also ==
- List of railway stations in Japan
