= Shin-Fuji Station (Shizuoka) =

Railway station in Fuji, Shizuoka prefecture, Japan

Shin-Fuji Station 新富士駅
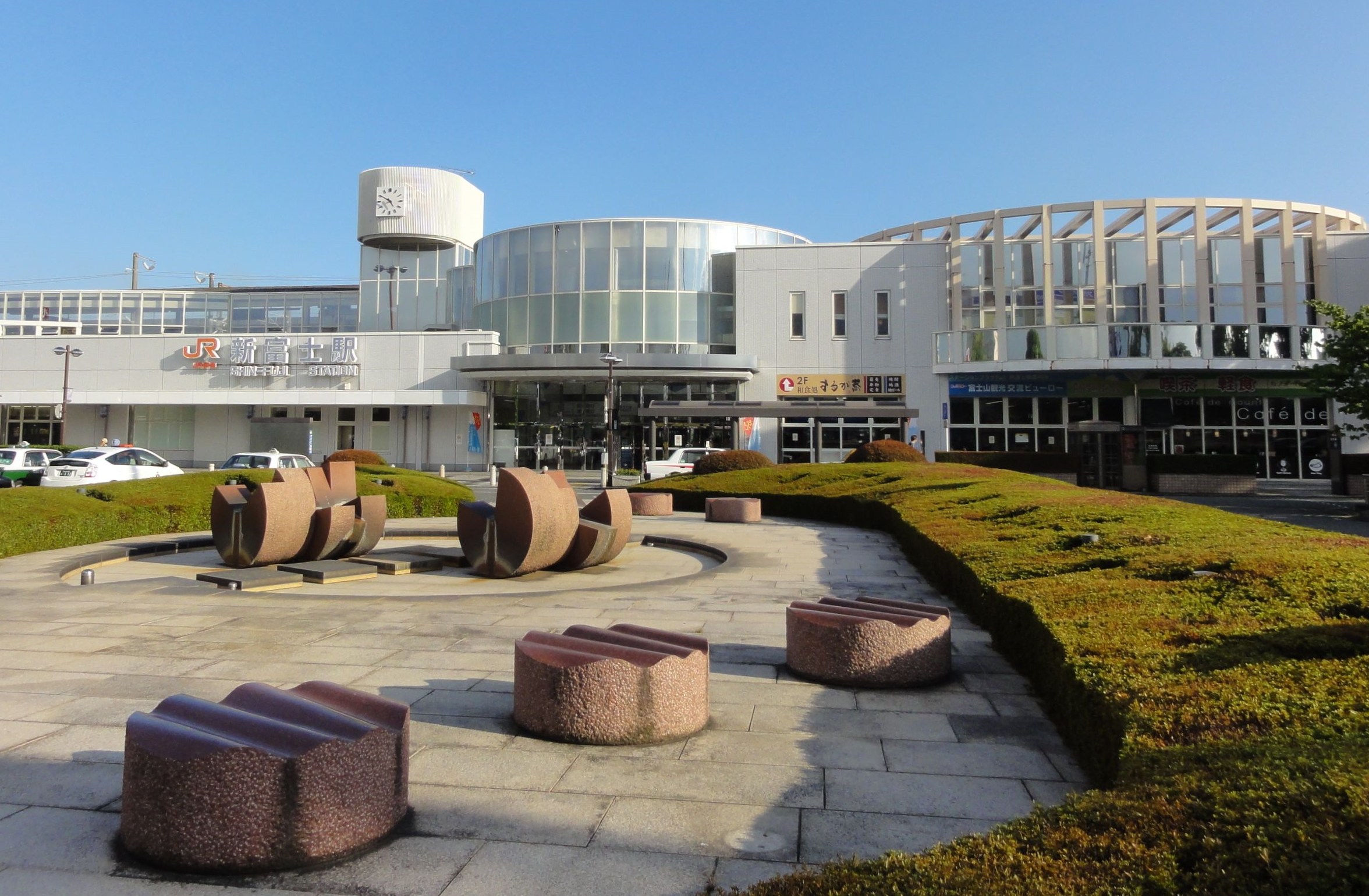
- The north side of the station in August 2014

General information
- Location: 640 Narishima, Fuji-shi, Shizuoka-ken; Japan
- Coordinates: 35.142365°N 138.663199°E
- Operator: JR Central
- Line: Tōkaidō Shinkansen
- Distance: 146.2 km (90.8 mi) from Tokyo
- Platforms: 2 side platforms
- Tracks: 2

Construction
- Structure type: Elevated

Other information
- Status: Staffed ("Midori no Madoguchi" )

History
- Opened: 13 March 1988; 38 years ago

Passengers
- FY 2023: 8,292 daily

Services
Preceding station	JR Central	Following station
Shizuoka towards Shin-Ōsaka	Tōkaidō Shinkansen Kodama	Mishima towards Tokyo
Location
- Location within Shizuoka Prefecture Location within Japan

Shin-Fuji Station (新富士駅, Shin-Fuji-eki) is a railway station on the Tokaido Shinkansen in the city of Fuji, Shizuoka, Japan, operated by the Central Japan Railway Company (JR Central).

== Lines ==
Shin-Fuji Station is served by the Tokaido Shinkansen, and is located 146.2 km (90.8 mi) from the eastern terminus of the line at Tokyo Station. There are no connecting rail lines to Shin-Fuji, with the nearest connecting being located at Fuji Station 2 km (1.2 mi) away. A connecting bus service runs several times an hour taking approximately 7 minutes.

== Station layout ==
Shin-Fuji Station is an elevated station with two opposed side platforms, connected to one another and to the station building by an underpass. The station building has automated ticket machines, automated turnstiles, and a "Midori no Madoguchi" staffed ticket office.

=== Platforms ===
1	■ Tokaido Shinkansen	for Shin-Yokohama and Tokyo
2	■ Tokaido Shinkansen	for Nagoya and Shin-Ōsaka

== History ==
Shin-Fuji Station opened on March 13, 1988, and is one of the Shinkansen stations which was opened due to petition by local municipalities. The city of Fuji paid for half of the construction costs, with surrounding municipalities, local industries, and the Shizuoka Prefecture paying for the remaining costs.

== Passenger statistics ==
In fiscal 2017, the station was used by an average of 4818 passengers daily (boarding passengers only).

== Surrounding area ==
The station is located in an industrial area, initially with few residences, stores, or connecting lines. There are buses from Shin-Fuji Station directly to the fifth Station on Mount Fuji. The trip is 2 hours and 40 minutes.

== See also ==
- List of railway stations in Japan
