= Kamaya Station (Aichi) =

Former railway station in Nishio, Aichi Prefecture, Japan

Coordinates: 34.8394°N 137.0610°E

Kamaya Station 鎌谷駅
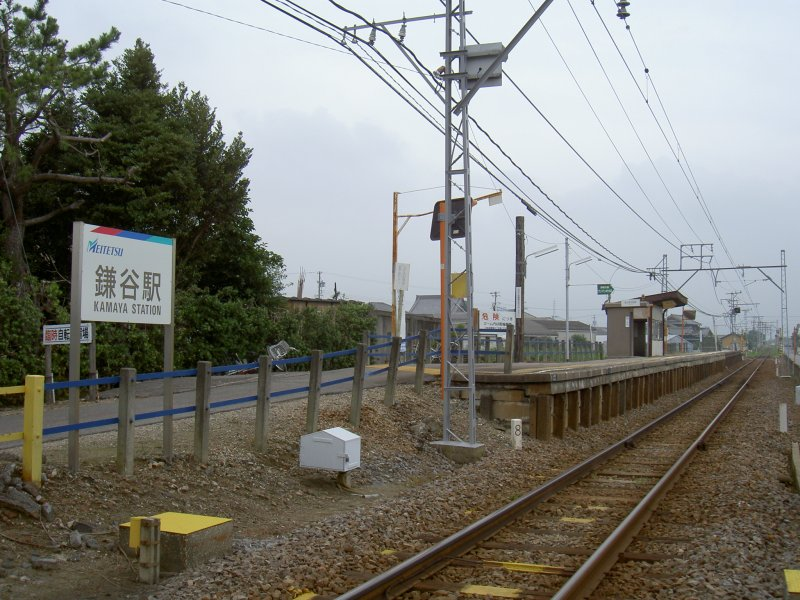
- Kamaya Station in July 2005

General information
- Location: Kamaya-cho nakayashiki, Nishio-shi, Aichi-ken; Japan
- Operator: Meitetsu
- Line: ■ Meitetsu Nishio Line
- Distance: 18.8 kilometers from Shin Anjō
- Platforms: 1 side platform

Other information
- Status: Unstaffed

History
- Opened: October 1, 1928
- Closed: December 16, 2006

Passengers
- FY2005: 97 daily
Location

Kamaya Station (鎌谷駅, Kamaya-eki) was a railway station in the city of Nishio, Aichi, Japan, operated by Meitetsu.

== Lines ==
Kamaya station was served by the Meitetsu Nishio Line, and is located 18.8 kilometers from the starting point of the line at Shin Anjō.

== Station history ==
Before the opening of the station, the Nishio Railway Company opened the Yokosuka-Guchi station temporarily to transport materials to build a bridge crossing the Yahagifurukawa River. However, the station was closed immediately after the construction was finished.

After this, movement requesting the Aichi Electric Railways to build a station in the area occurred. The petition was approved, and the station was built with the area paying for the costs. The station name was also changed to Kamaya, by requests from the residents.

The station was closed in 2006 due to the lack of users.
