= WeSPa-Tsubakiyama Station =

Railway station in Fukaura, Aomori Prefecture, Japan

WeSPa-Tsubakiyama Station ウェスパ椿山駅
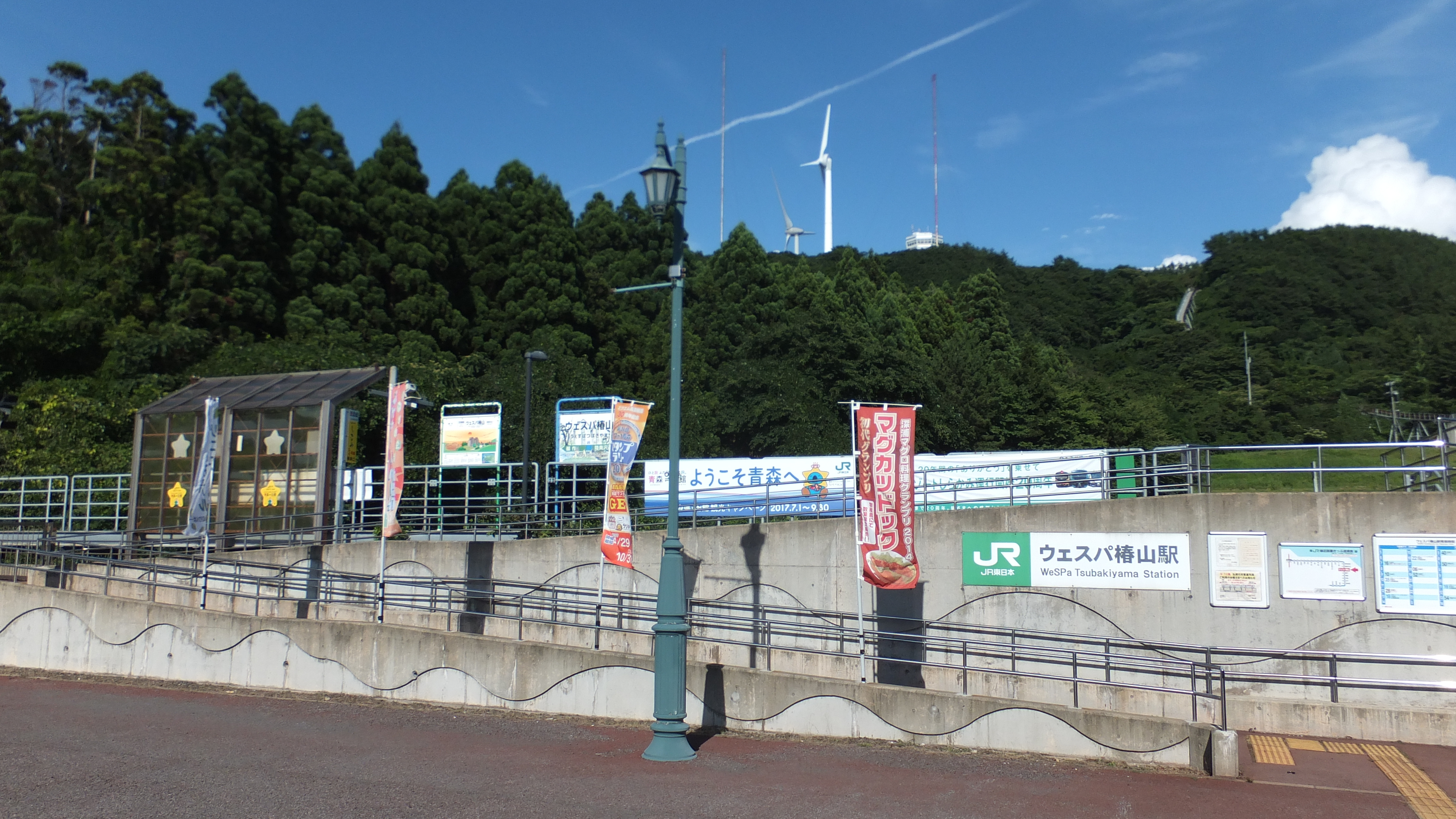
- WeSPa-Tsubakiyama Station in August 2017

General information
- Location: 226-1 Henashi Nabeishi, Fukaura-machi, Nishitsugaru-gun, Aomori-ken 038-2327; Japan
- Coordinates: 40°35′34.56″N 139°52′16.56″E
- Operator: JR East
- Line: ■ Gonō Line
- Distance: 56.0 km from Higashi-Noshiro
- Platforms: 1 side platform
- Tracks: 1

Other information
- Status: Unstaffed
- Website: Official website (in Japanese)

History
- Opened: December 1, 2001

Services
Preceding station	JR East	Following station
Jūniko towards Higashi-Noshiro	Gonō Line Rapid	Fukaura One-way operation
Mutsu-Sawabe towards Higashi-Noshiro	Gonō Line Local	Henashi towards Hirosaki
Location
- Location within Japan

WeSPa-Tsubakiyama Station (ウェスパ椿山駅, Wesupa-Tsubakiyama-eki) is a railway station on the Gonō Line in the town of Fukaura, Aomori Prefecture, Japan, operated by East Japan Railway Company (JR East).

== Lines ==
WeSPa-Tsubakiyama Station is served by the Gonō Line, and lies 56.0 kilometers from the southern terminus of the line at Higashi-Noshiro.

== Station layout ==
WeSPa-Tsubakiyama Station has a single side platform serving bidirectional traffic. The station is unattended.

== History ==
WeSPa-Tsubakiyama Station opened on December 1, 2001. Initially, only the special express Resort Shirakami stopped at this station. From December 2, 2002, all local services on the Gonō Line also began stopping at this station.

== Surrounding area ==
- WeSPa Tsubakiyama Resort

== See also ==
- List of railway stations in Japan
