= Yatsushima Station =

Railway station in Fukui, Fukui Prefecture, Japan

Yatsushima Station 八ツ島駅
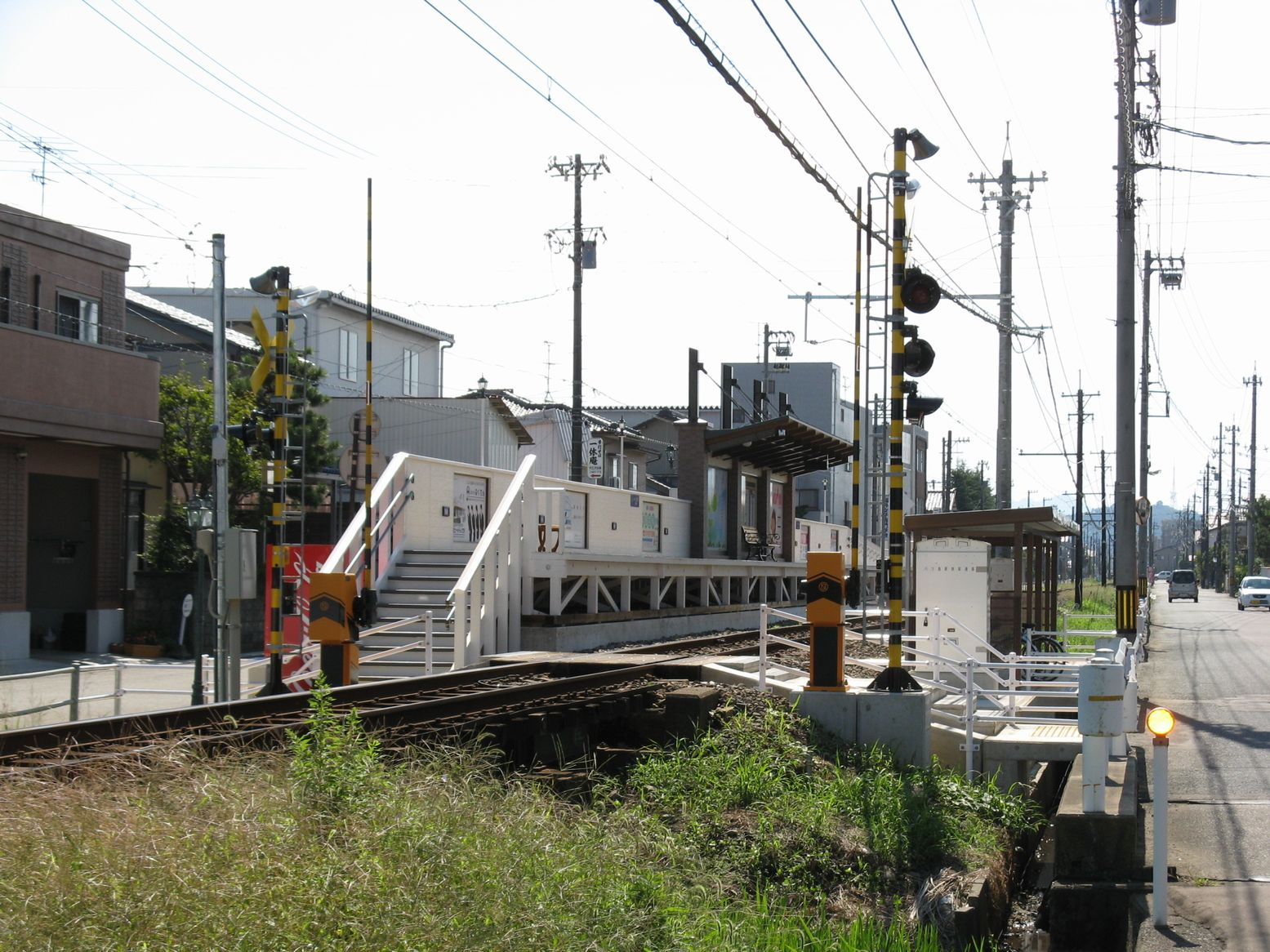
- Yatsushima Station in October 2007

General information
- Location: 5-17 Ninomiya, Fukui-shi, Fukui-ken 910-0065; Japan
- Coordinates: 36°05′10″N 136°12′22″E
- Operator: Echizen Railway
- Line: ■ Mikuni Awara Line
- Distance: 4.2 km from Fukuiguchi
- Platforms: 1 side platform
- Tracks: 1

Other information
- Status: Unstaffed
- Station code: E29
- Website: Official website

History
- Opened: December 30, 1928
- Closed: 1944-2007
Location
- Location within Japan

Yatsushima Station (八ツ島駅, Yatsushima-eki) is an Echizen Railway Mikuni Awara Line railway station located in the city of Fukui, Fukui Prefecture, Japan.

== Lines ==
Yatsushima Station is served by the Mikuni Awara Line, and is located 4.2 kilometers from the terminus of the line at Fukuiguchi.

== Station layout ==
The station consists of one side platform serving a single bi-directional track. The station is unattended.

== Adjacent stations ==
«	Service	»
Mikuni Awara Line
Express: Does not stop at this station
Nikkakagaku-Mae	Local	Nakatsuno

== History ==
Yatsushima Station was opened on December 30, 1928. On September 1, 1942 the Keifuku Electric Railway merged with Mikuni Awara Electric Railway. Operations were halted from April 20, 1944. The station reopened on September 1, 2007 as an Echizen Railway station.

== Surrounding area ==
- The surrounding area is primarily residential. To the east lies a small shopping center and the Awara Kaidō (Fukui / Ishikawa Prefectural Route 5).
- Other points of interest include:
  - Tōmyōji Nawate Nitta Yoshisada War Memorial
  - Fukui City Fujishima Junior High School
  - Fukui Prefecture Budōkan

== See also ==
- List of railway stations in Japan
