= Noda-Shimmachi Station =

Railway station in Kariya, Aichi Prefecture, Japan

CA57 Noda-Shimmachi Station 野田新町駅
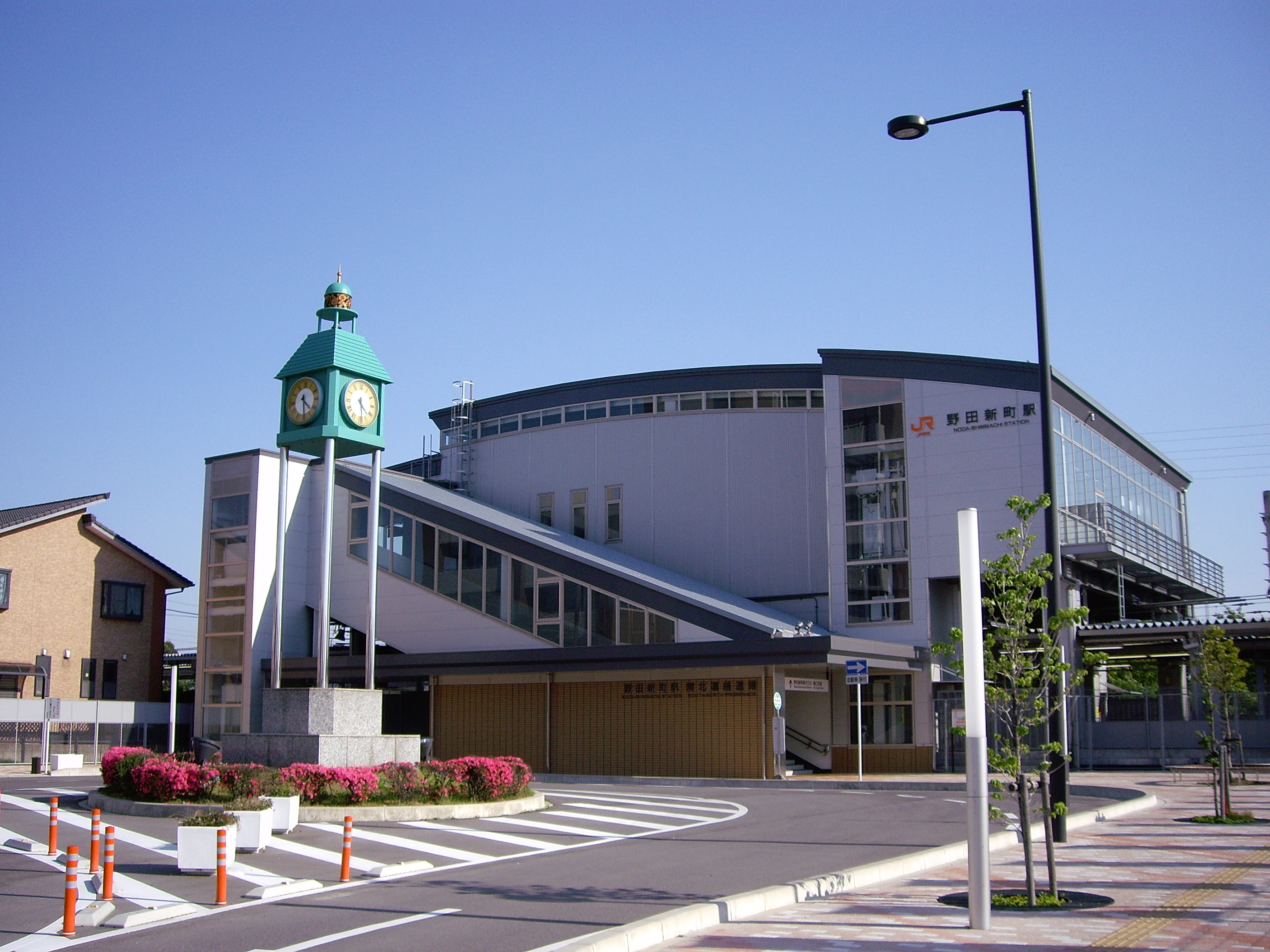
- Noda-Shimmachi Station, June 2009

General information
- Location: 1–905 Noda-Shimmachi, Kariya-shi, Aichi-ken 448–086; Japan
- Coordinates: 34.9844°N 137.0266°E
- Operator: JR Central
- Line: Tokaido Main Line
- Distance: 339.7 kilometers from Tokyo
- Platforms: 2 side platforms

Other information
- Status: Staffed
- Station code: CA57
- Website: Official website

History
- Opened: 18 March 2007

Passengers
- 2023–2024: 4,746 daily
Location
- Location within Aichi Prefecture Location within Japan

Noda-Shimmachi Station (野田新町駅, Noda-Shinmachi-eki) is a railway station in the city of Kariya, Aichi Prefecture, Japan, operated by Central Japan Railway Company (JR Tōkai).

== Lines ==
Noda-Shimmachi Station is served by the Tōkaidō Main Line, and is located 339.7 kilometers from the starting point of the line at Tokyo Station.

== Station layout ==
The station has two opposed side platforms connected by a footbridge. The station building has automated ticket machines, TOICA automated turnstiles and is staffed.

=== Platforms ===
| 1 | ■ Tōkaidō Main Line | For Nagoya and Ōgaki |
| 2 | ■ Tōkaidō Main Line | For Okazaki and Toyohashi |

== Adjacent stations ==
| « | Service | » |
Tōkaidō Main Line
| Higashi-Kariya | Local | Kariya |
Special Rapid: Does not stop at this station
New Rapid: Does not stop at this station
Rapid: Does not stop at this station
Sectional Rapid: Does not stop at this station

== Station history ==
Noda-Shinmachi Station opened on 18 March 2007.

Station numbering was introduced to the section of the Tōkaidō Line operated JR Central in March 2018; Noda-Shinmachi Station was assigned station number CA57.

== Passenger statistics ==
In fiscal 2017, the station was used by an average of 2488 passengers daily.

== Surrounding area ==
- Kariya Toyota General Hospital
- Kariya Higashi High School

== See also ==
- List of railway stations in Japan
