= Shin-Fuji Station (Hokkaido) =

Railway station in Kushiro, Hokkaido, Japan

K52 Shin-Fuji Station 新富士駅
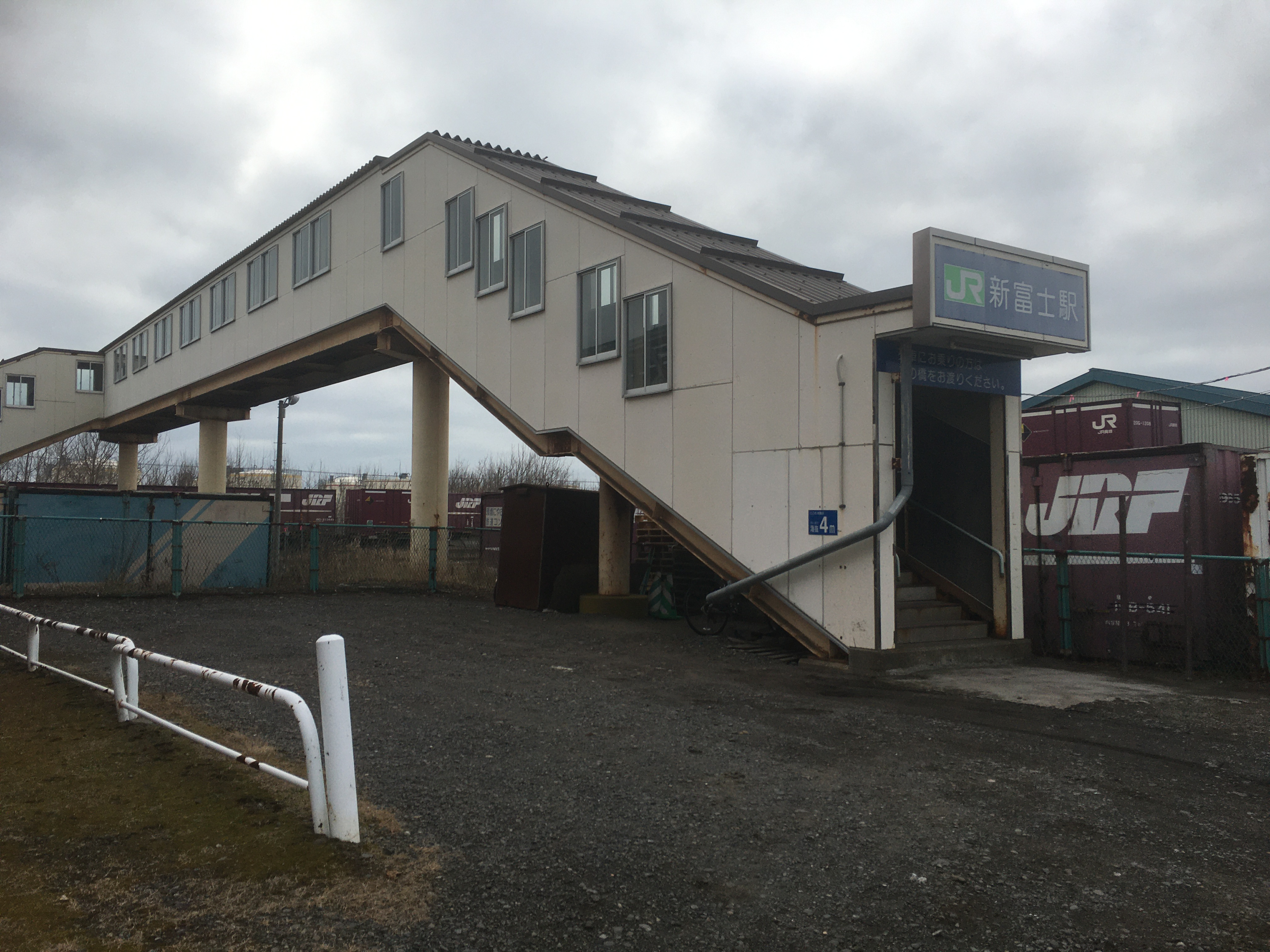
- JR Nemuro-Main-Line, Shin-Fuji Station entrance, 2021

General information
- Location: 3 Chome-1 Shinfujicho, Kushiro, Hokkaido 084-0904; Japan
- Coordinates: 43°0′6.43″N 144°20′59.41″E
- System: regional rail
- Operator: JR Hokkaido
- Line: Nemuro Main Line
- Distance: 169.4 km from Shintoku
- Platforms: 1 island platform
- Tracks: 2

Other information
- Status: Unattended
- Station code: K52
- Website: Official website

History
- Opened: 25 December 1923; 102 years ago

Passengers
- FY2014: 42 daily

Services
| Preceding station | JR Hokkaido | Following station |
|---|---|---|
| Shin-Otanoshike towards Takikawa | Nemuro Main Line Local | Kushiro towards Nemuro |
Location
- Location within Hokkaido Location within Japan

Shin-Fuji Station (新富士駅, Shin-Fuji-eki) is a railway station located in the city of Kushiro, Hokkaidō, Japan. It is operated by JR Hokkaido. The Kushiro Freight Terminal (釧路貨物駅, Kushiro Kamotsu-eki) of Japan Freight Railway Company (JR Freight) is adjacently located and had also been called "Shin-Fuji"until the renaming on March 12, 2011.

== Lines ==
The station is served by the Nemuro Main Line, and lies 169.4 km from the starting point of the line at Shintoku .

== Layout ==
Shin-Fuji Station has one island platform. There are freight train tracks on the north and south sides of the platform, and passengers must use a footbridge to access the platform from the entrance/exit on the north side of the premises. Platforms 1 and 2 are located from the north side. Passenger trains generally depart and arrive on Platform 1, which is a single through track, and only use Platform 2 when passing between trains. JR Freight station staff are on hand, but they do not operate a passenger counter, making this an unmanned station managed by Kushiro Station for passenger service.

=== Platforms ===
| 1 | ■ Nemuro Main Line | for Obihiro and Shintoku |
| 2 | ■ Nemuro Main Line | for Kushiro |

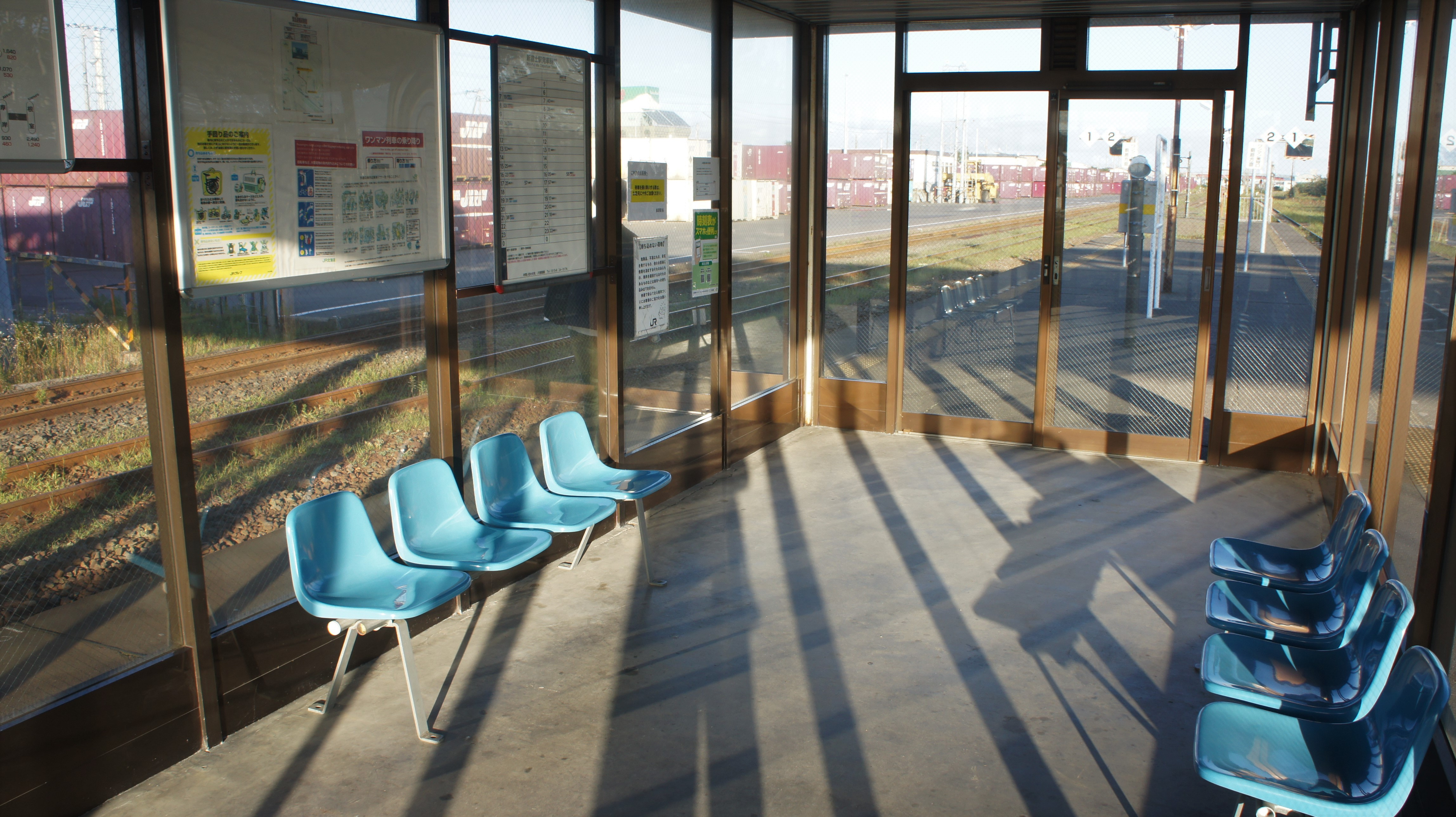
Waiting room

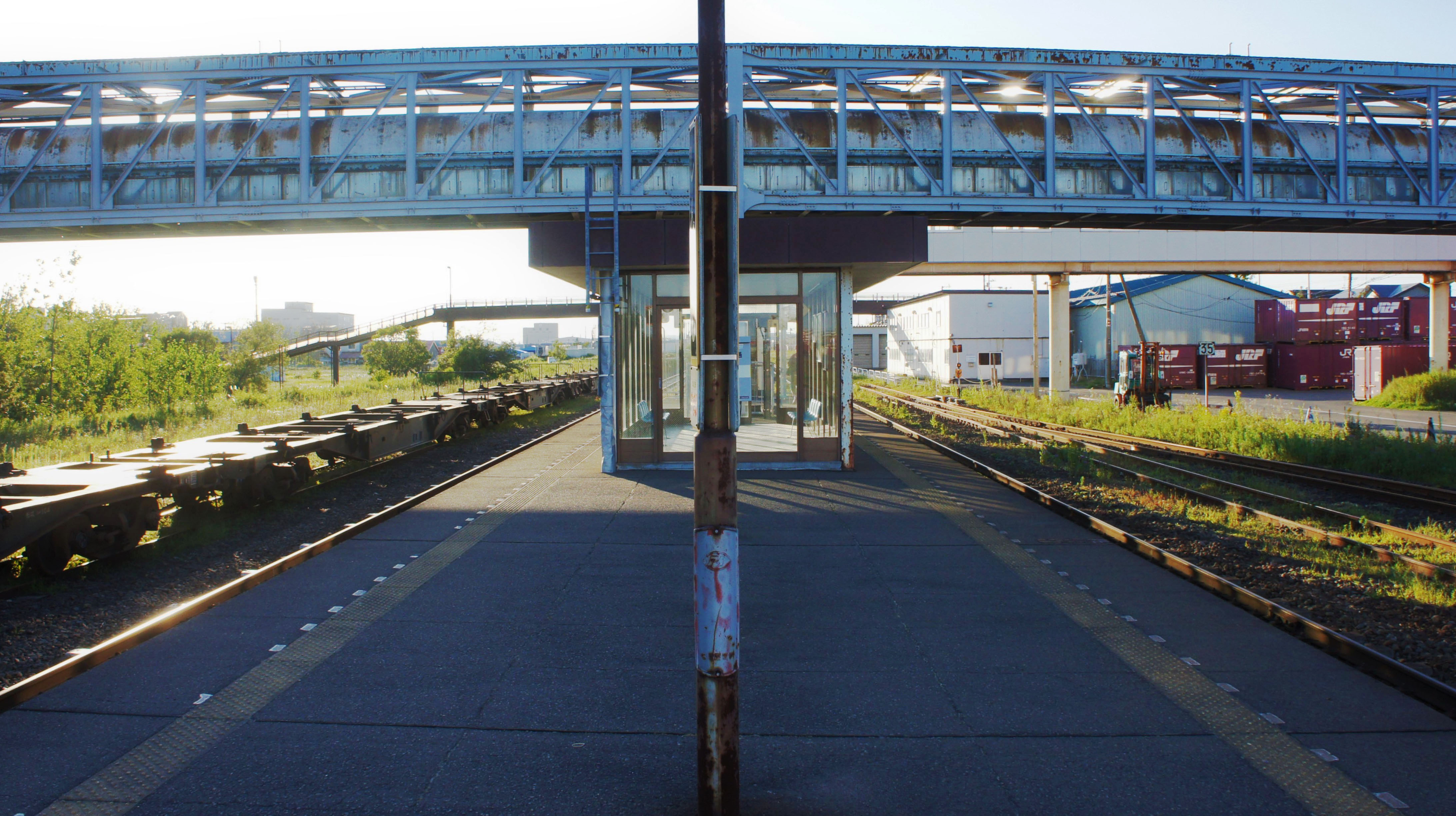
Platform

== History ==
The station opened on 25 December 1923 by the Japanese Government Railways as a junction for the private line of the Fuji Paper Kushiro Mill (later merged with Nippon Paper Kushiro Mill and closed in 2021). Initially, Fuji Paper transported raw lumber from the shores of Lake Akan by boat and horse-drawn carriages. The government agreed to open a station on the condition that Fuji Paper Mills would own the land and all funding. Following the privatization of the Japanese National Railways on 1 April 1987, the station came under the control of JR Hokkaido.The freight terminal was renamed Kushiro Freight Terminal on March 12, 2011.

== Passenger statistics ==
In fiscal 2014, the station was used by an average of 42 passengers daily.

== Surrounding area ==
The station is located in the hinterland of the International Bulk Strategic Port, Hokkaido's largest grain import/export hub, and is surrounded by factories and distribution centers.

- Japan National Route 38
- Kushiro Central Wholesale Market

== See also ==
- List of railway stations in Japan
