= Fukui College of Health Sciences =

Higher education institution in Fukui, Japan

Coordinates: 36°7′46.8″N 136°9′58.5″E

- 福井医療短期大学; Fukui Iryō Tanki Daigaku
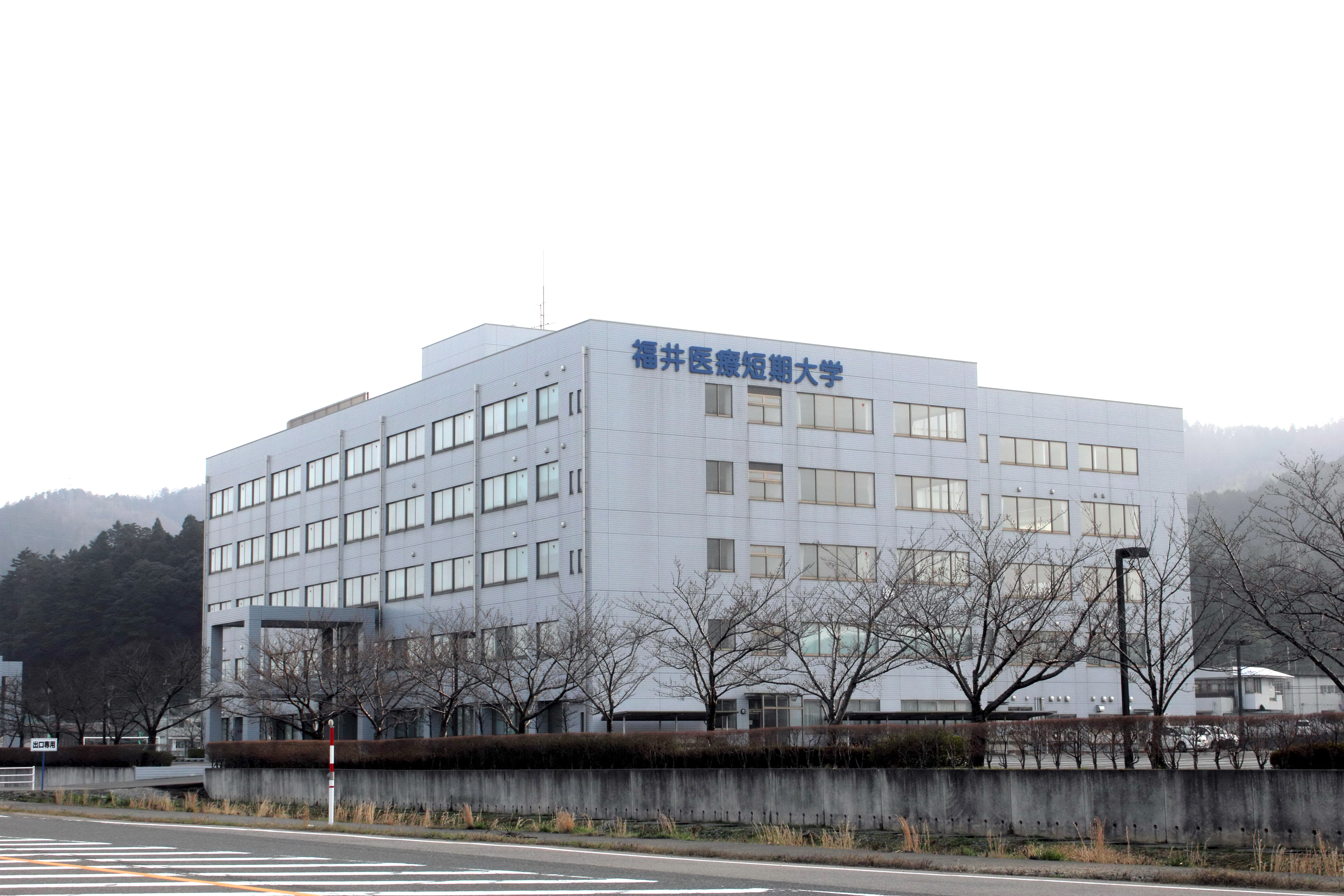
- Fukui College of Health Sciences
- Type: Private
- Established: 1965
- Location: Fukui, Fukui, Japan
- Website: Official website

Fukui College of Health Sciences (福井医療短期大学, Fukui Iryō Tanki Daigaku) is a private Junior college in Fukui, Fukui, Japan.

== History ==
The college was founded in 1971 as a nursing school. It was authorized as a special training college in 1976, and it developed into an integrated special school of medical technology. The specialized school was developed and was reorganized, with the junior college in 2006.
