= BYD Seal 08 =

Full-size sedan

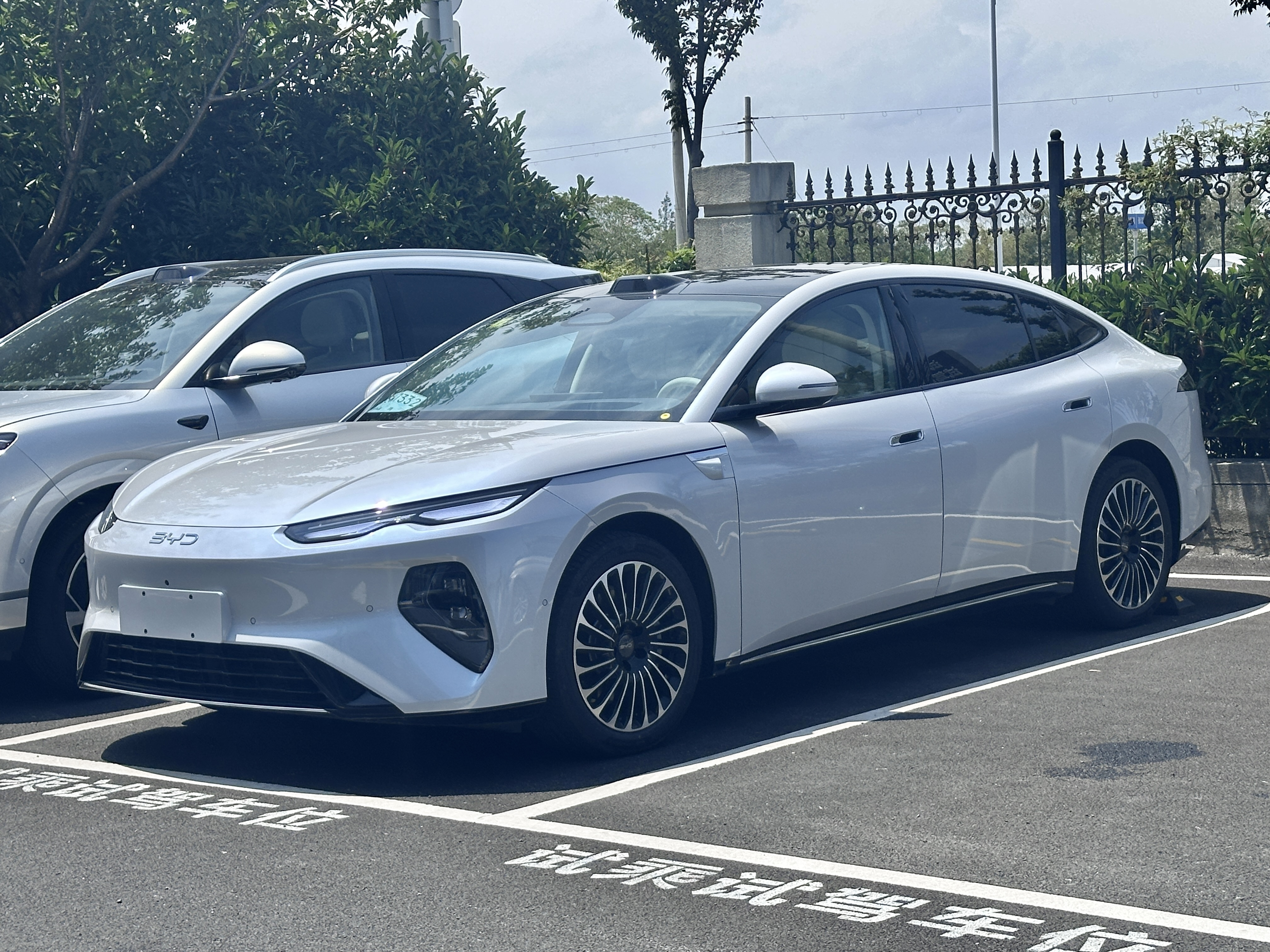

Overview
- Manufacturer: BYD Auto
- Production: 2026–present
- Assembly: China
- Designer: Under the lead of Wolfgang Egger

Body and chassis
- Class: Full-size car (E)
- Body style: 4-door sedan
- Layout: Dual-motor, all-wheel-drive
- Platform: DM-i 5.0 platform (DM-i); Super e platform (EV)
- Related: BYD Sealion 08; BYD Datang; BYD Dahan; BYD Han L; BYD Tang L; Fangchengbao Ti7

Powertrain
- Engine: Petrol plug-in hybrid: 1.5 L turbo I4
- Battery: 45.36 kWh LFP; 76.744 kWh BYD Blade LFP; 92.093 kWh BYD Blade LFP
- Electric range: 775–905 km (482–562 mi) (EV, CLTC); 270–300 km (168–186 mi) (PHEV, WLTP)

Dimensions
- Wheelbase: 3,030 mm (119.3 in)
- Length: 5,150 mm (202.8 in)
- Width: 1,999 mm (78.7 in)
- Height: 1,505 mm (59.3 in)

The BYD Seal 08 (Chinese: 比亚迪海豹 08; pinyin: Bǐyàdí Hǎibào 08) is a battery electric and plug-in hybrid full-size sedan produced by BYD Auto. It was launched in China in July 2026

== Overview ==
The Seal 08 was previewed by the BYD Ocean-S concept shown at the 2025 Shanghai Auto Show Its concept version was made to showcase BYD's future direction when it comes to designing their cars. At BYD's Ocean Day on December 15, 2025, the Seal 08 was officially announced alongside the Sealion 08. Teasers were shown on March 3, 2026. The Seal 08 was officially unveiled on March 5, 2026, and will officially launch in the second quarter of 2026.

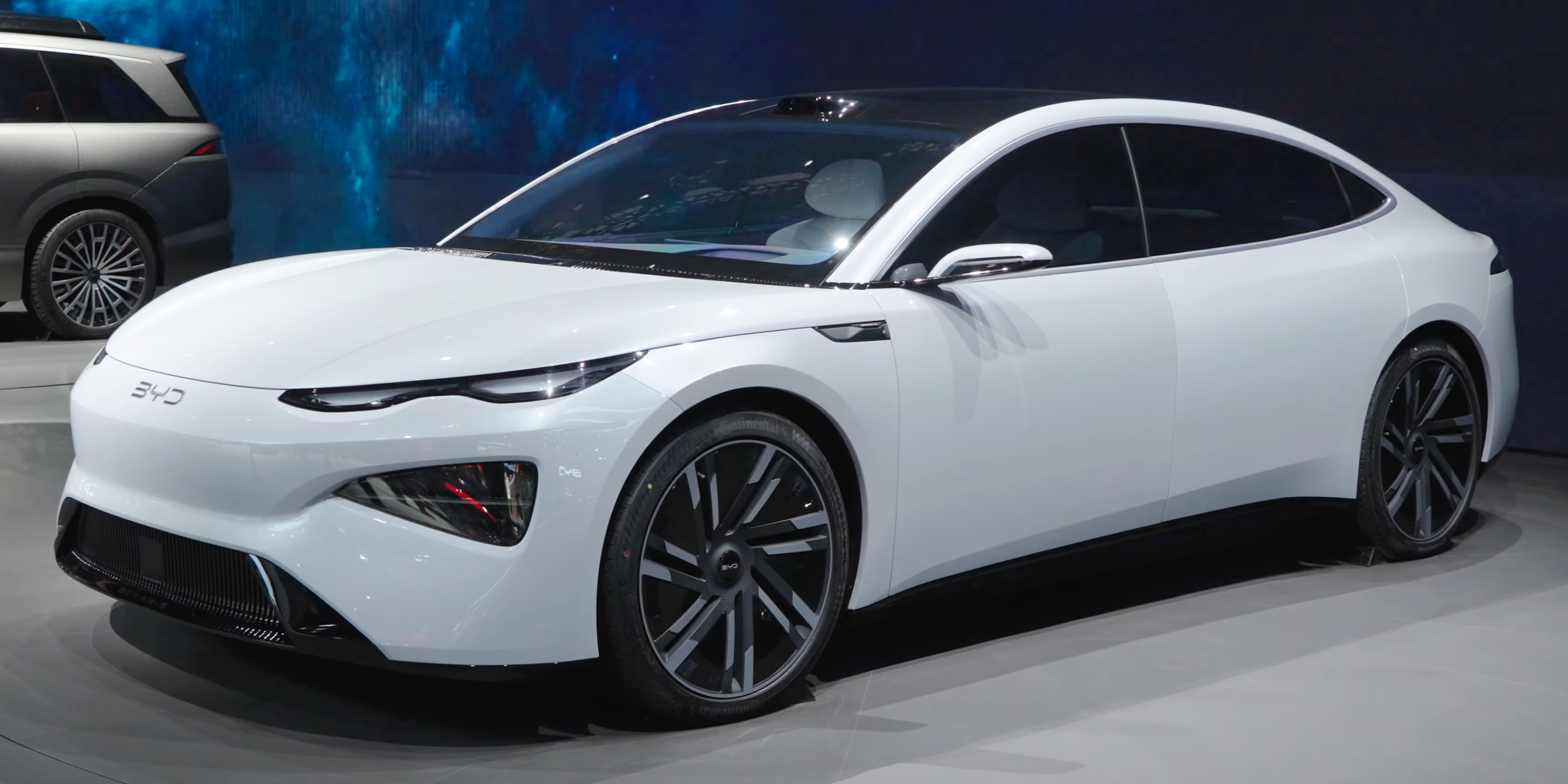
The BYD Ocean-S concept introduced at Auto Shanghai 2025 directly previewed the Seal 08.

=== Design ===
The Seal 08 retains most of the design of the Ocean-S concept that previewed it. It utilizes a closed-off grille complimented by narrow headlights that weave at their base. Ambient lighting is incorporated into the air ducts on both sides. It uses a fastback silhouette. Two-tone exterior paint is available on the top-end configurations.

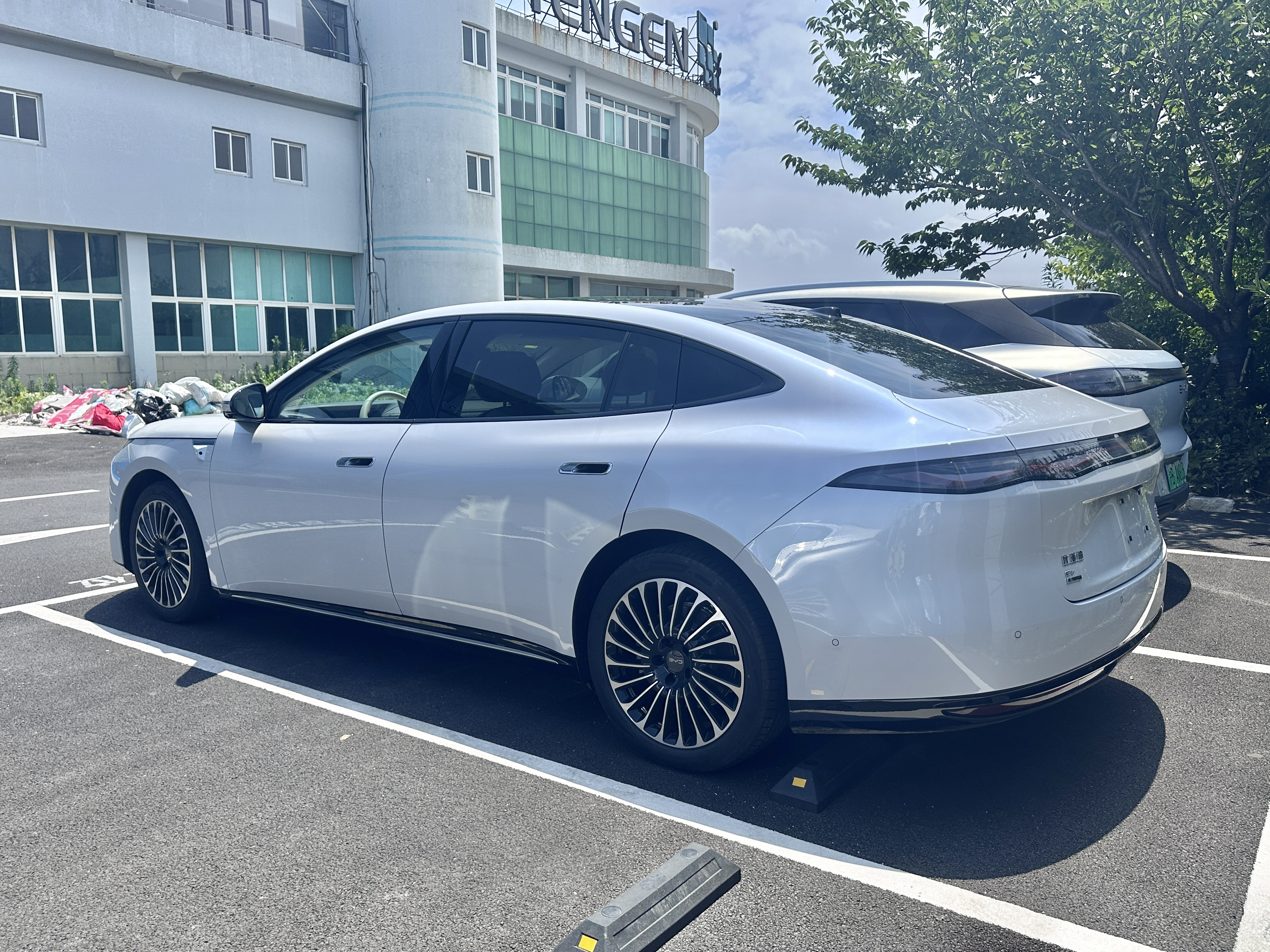
Rear view

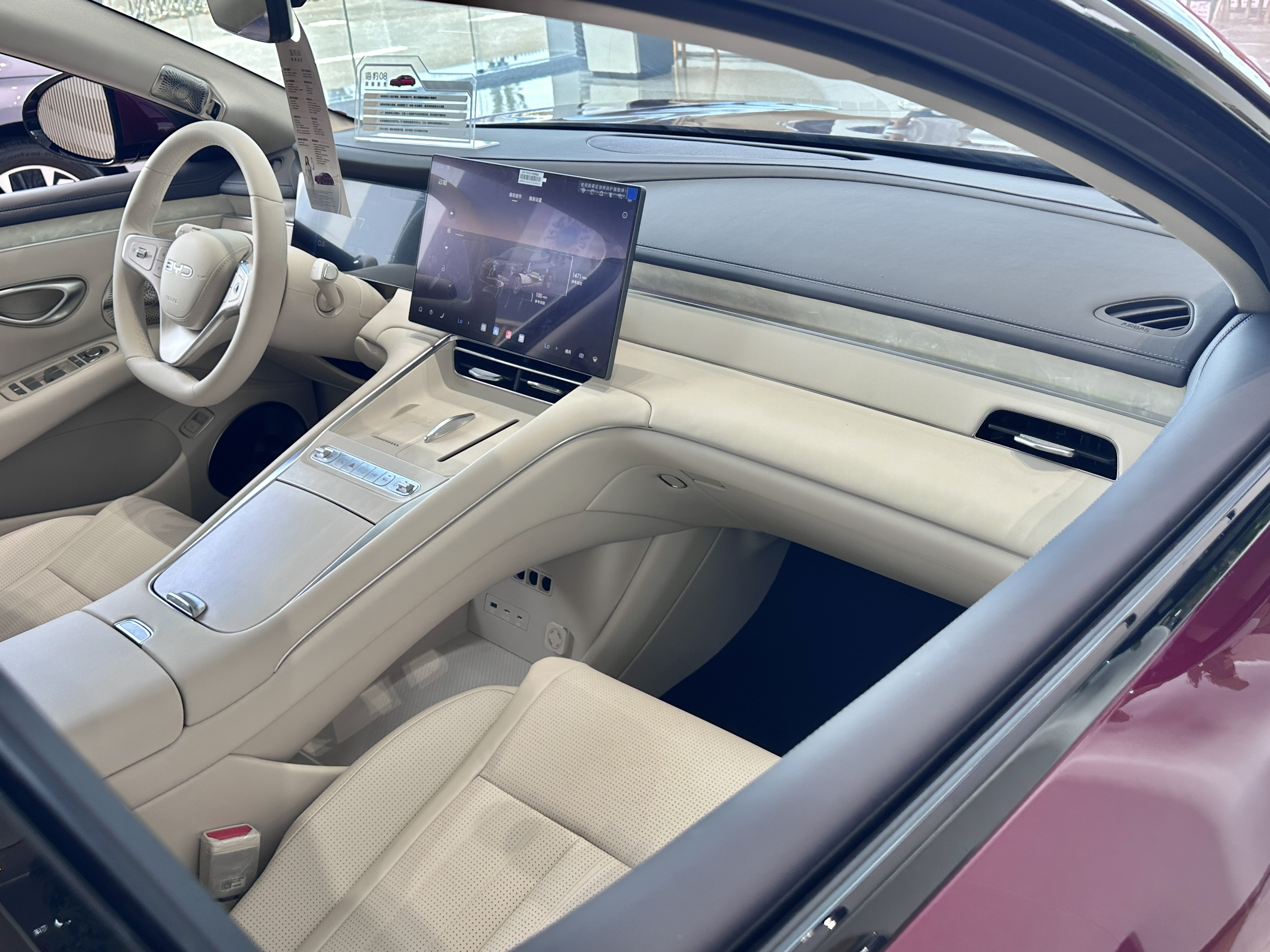
Interior

=== Features ===
The Seal 08 uses BYD's DiSus-A intelligent body control system that replaces traditional coil-spring suspension with dual-chamber air suspension with LiDAR-based bump prediction, as well as rear-wheel steering for enhanced maneuverability for a turning radius of 4.95 m (16.2 ft). Also included is the God's Eye B self-driving system that uses a LiDAR sensor, which can drive the vehicle in cities as well as on highways and park it autonomously. It has a 160-litre (5.7 cu ft) power-opening frunk. The dashboard has a 12.3-inch digital instrument panel, a 15.6-inch central infotainment display, and a 26-inch AR-HUD. The center console features dual active-cooled 50W wireless charging pads and a refrigerator compartment capable of holding six 550 ml (19 imp fl oz; 19 US fl oz) beverage cans, which can cool to −6–15 °C (21–59 °F) or heat to 35–50 °C (95–122 °F). The interior features eight magnetic points for mounting magnetic customizable buttons, with additional screw mounts paired with USB-C power ports intended to mount phone holders and dashcams, and there are available tablet holder mountings in the rear. All seats have heating, ventilation, and massage functions, and front row and outboard rear seats also have power adjustable legrests. The front row seats both have a one-touch 'zero-gravity' recline mode. It has a 20-speaker Devialet sound system, the dashboard features a mother-of-pearl ambient lighting effect, and all windows are double-glazed to reduce wind noise. The rear seats have access to airline-style tray tables mounted to the rear of the front-row seats, a split dual-sunroof with individual sunshades, and a touchscreen in the fold-down armrest for seat adjustment, HVAC setting, and media controls.

== Powertrain ==
The Seal 08 is available as either a pure-electric or plug-in hybrid vehicle, both of which use second-generation Blade LFP battery.

=== Battery electric ===
The Seal 08 EV is built on an 800-volt platform and uses the company's second-generation Blade lithium iron phosphate battery, available in either 76.7 kWh or 92.1 kWh capacities providing CLTC ranges of up to 785 km (488 mi) and 905 km (562 mi), respectively. The Seal 08's Flash Charging compatibility allows it to add 249 miles (401 km) in 5 minutes of charging. Rear-wheel drive variants with the smaller battery output 342 hp (255 kW; 347 PS), which increases to 342 hp (255 kW; 347 PS) with the large battery model. The all-wheel drive version adds a 261 hp (195 kW; 265 PS) and 310 N⋅m (229 lb⋅ft) torque front motor for a total of 644 hp (480 kW; 653 PS).

=== Plug-in hybrid ===
The plug-in hybrid version of the Seal 08 uses a 1.5-liter turbocharged inline-4 petrol engine with a maximum output of 154 hp (115 kW; 156 PS) at 5,500rpm and 110 kW (148 hp; 150 PS) net power and maximum torque of 225 N⋅m (166 lb⋅ft) at 2,500–4,500rpm, combined with a 268 hp (200 kW; 272 PS) 315 N⋅m (232 lb⋅ft) torque front-mounted electric motor; dual-motor variants add a 268 hp (200 kW; 272 PS) and 315 N⋅m (232 lb⋅ft) torque rear motor for a total of 537 hp (400 kW; 544 PS) and 360 N⋅m (266 lb⋅ft) of torque. Energy is supplied by a 45.4 kWh LFP battery providing a pure electric WLTP range up to 300 km (186 mi).

Specifications
Model	Battery		Power	Torque	Electric range		10–97% DCFC time	0–100 km/h (62 mph)	Kerb weight
Model	Type	Weight	Power	Torque	WLTP	CLTC	10–97% DCFC time	0–100 km/h (62 mph)	Kerb weight
PHEV FWD	45.36 kWh LFP	339 kg (747 lb)	268 hp (200 kW; 272 PS)	315 N⋅m (232 lb⋅ft)	300 km (186 mi)	400 km (249 mi)	9 mins	6.8 sec	2,140 kg (4,718 lb)
PHEV AWD	45.36 kWh LFP	339 kg (747 lb)	537 hp (400 kW; 544 PS)	675 N⋅m (498 lb⋅ft)	270 km (168 mi)	350 km (217 mi)	9 mins	3.8 sec	2,270 kg (5,004 lb)
EV RWD	76.744 kWh BYD Blade LFP	539 kg (1,188 lb)	342 hp (255 kW; 347 PS)	500 N⋅m (369 lb⋅ft)	—	775 km (482 mi)	9 mins	5.2 sec	2,040 kg (4,497 lb)
EV Long Range RWD	92.093 kWh BYD Blade LFP	633 kg (1,396 lb)	429 hp (320 kW; 435 PS)	500 N⋅m (369 lb⋅ft)	—	905 km (562 mi)	9 mins	4.9 sec	2,160 kg (4,762 lb)
EV Long Range AWD	92.093 kWh BYD Blade LFP	633 kg (1,396 lb)	684 hp (510 kW; 693 PS)	810 N⋅m (597 lb⋅ft)	—	785 km (488 mi)	9 mins	3.3 sec	2,280 kg (5,027 lb)

== See also ==
- List of BYD Auto vehicles
