= BYD Dahan =

Full-size sedan

Overview
- Manufacturer: BYD Auto
- Production: 2026–present
- Assembly: China
- Designer: Under the lead of Wolfgang Egger

Body and chassis
- Class: Full-size car (F)
- Body style: 4-door sedan
- Layout: EV: Rear-motor, rear-wheel-drive; Dual-motor, all-wheel-drive; PHEV: Front-engine, dual-motor, all-wheel-drive
- Platform: Super e-Platform
- Related: BYD Datang; BYD Han L; BYD Tang L; BYD Seal 08; BYD Sealion 08; Fangchengbao Ti7

Powertrain
- Engine: Petrol plug-in hybrid: 1.5 L BYD472ZQB turbo I4
- Power output: 496–764 hp (370–570 kW; 503–775 PS) (EV); 422 hp (315 kW; 428 PS) (PHEV)
- Hybrid drivetrain: Series-parallel plug-in hybrid
- Battery: 102.3 kWh Blade 2.0 LFP
- Electric range: 880–1,008 km (547–626 mi) (CLTC)

Dimensions
- Wheelbase: 3,130 mm (123.2 in)
- Length: 5,256 mm (206.9 in)
- Width: 1,999 mm (78.7 in)
- Height: 1,510 mm (59.4 in)
- Curb weight: 2,210–2,505 kg (4,872–5,523 lb)

The BYD Dahan (Chinese: 比亚迪大汉; lit. 'Great Han'), alternatively known in English as the BYD Great Han, is a battery electric and plug-in hybrid full-size sedan produced by BYD Auto from 2026 onwards. Alongside the BYD Datang, it is the flagship model of BYD's Dynasty line of models.

== Overview ==
Initially known as the Han 9 during January 2026 teasers alongside the Datang (referred to "Tang 9" then), the Dahan is BYD's first F-segment (full-size) (Chinese "D-segment") sedan. It was officially revealed on 11 June 2026.

Rear view

=== Design and equipment ===
The Dahan adopts an exterior design based on BYD's typical design language similar to the Han L, using the "Loong (dragon) Face" that includes thin headlights joined by a chrome-plated panel. It also features blackened pillars and a floating roof. Due to its sleek shape and large front air curtain vents, it achieves a drag coefficient of 0.197C_{d}. Both 20-inch and 21-inch wheel designs are offered.

BYD says the Dahan has a usable floor area ratio of 90.8% which measures 2,005 mm (78.9 in) long and 1,580 mm (62.2 in) wide. It has 500 litres (17.7 cu ft) of rear cargo space, and the battery electric version has a 130-litre (4.6 cu ft) frunk.

It features a similar interior to the Datang, featuring a 3-screen setup including a 12.3-inch driver display, optional 40-inch AR-HUD, 17.3-inch central display, and an optional 12.3-inch passenger display, and the rear passengers optional dual 17.3-inch 3K-resolution entertainment displays. Leather upholstery with real wood trim is offered. Additionally, the Dahan is equipped with a 25 or 31-speaker Devialet 7.1.4 surround sound system featuring headrest integrated speakers, soft-closing doors, a refrigerator in the center console with a temperature range of −6–50 °C (21–122 °F), folding seatback tables for the back row, and electrochromic rear windows with an adjustable transparency. The front seats are capable of a 'zero-gravity' recline mode, while the rear outboard seats have extending legrests and the passenger side seat also has a folding footrest. All windows use dual-pane acoustic glass.

The Dahan is built on the 1000-volt Super e-Platform, equipped with BYD's flash charging technology. It has rear wheel steering as standard, reducing the turning radius to 4.95 m (16.2 ft), and the DiSus-A dual-chamber air suspension system with 100 mm (3.9 in) of ride height adjustment. An intelligent crab walk mode utilizes the rear wheel steering for greater low-speed mobility.

== Powertrain ==
Three powertrains of the Dahan have been revealed, including two battery-electric and one plug-in hybrid version.

A rear-wheel-drive model with a single rear motor produces up to 370 kW (496 hp), has a top speed of 240 km/h (149 mph), a CLTC driving range of 1,008 km (626 mi) and a WLTP driving range of 816 km (507 mi). An all-wheel-drive model adds a 200 kW (268 hp) front motor that boosts power to 570 kW (764 hp), the top speed to 270 km/h (168 mph) but with a lowered range of 880 km (547 mi). BYD claims the all-wheel drive variant can accelerate from 0–100 km/h (62 mph) in 3.3seconds, 100–150 km/h (62–93 mph) in 3.2seconds, and brake from 100 km/h (62 mph) to a stop in 32.83 m (107.7 ft). BYD claims the rear-wheel drive variant has an energy consumption of 11.5 kWh/100 km (0.115 kW⋅h/km; 0.185 kW⋅h/mi), while all-wheel drive variants achieve 13.1 kWh/100 km (0.131 kW⋅h/km; 0.211 kW⋅h/mi).

The plug-in hybrid variant has a combined power output of 315 kW (422 hp), a top speed of 225 km/h (140 mph) and a pure electric driving range of 370 km (230 mi).

All models are equipped with a 102.3 kWh second-generation BYD Blade battery. Flash charging allows the Dahan to charge from 10% to 97% in 9 minutes.

Specifications
Model	Battery		Motor		Power	Torque	Range	0–100 km/h (62 mph)	Top speed	Kerb weight
Model	Type	Weight	Front	Rear	Power	Torque	CLTC	0–100 km/h (62 mph)	Top speed	Kerb weight
EV RWD	102.326 kWh Blade 2.0 LFP	725.9 kg (1,600 lb)	—	370 kW TZ226QYD PMSM	496 hp (370 kW; 503 PS)	500 N⋅m (369 lb⋅ft)	1,008 km (626 mi)	4.9 s	240 km/h (149 mph)	2,260 kg (4,982 lb)
EV AWD	102.326 kWh Blade 2.0 LFP	725.9 kg (1,600 lb)	200 kW YS230XYG induction	370 kW TZ226QYD PMSM	764 hp (570 kW; 775 PS)	910 N⋅m (671 lb⋅ft)	880 km (547 mi)	3.3 s	270 km/h (168 mph)	2,505 kg (5,523 lb)

== See also ==
- List of BYD Auto vehicles
