= BYD Sealion 08 =

Full-size crossover SUV

Overview
- Manufacturer: BYD Auto
- Production: 2026–present
- Assembly: China
- Designer: Under the lead of Wolfgang Egger

Body and chassis
- Class: Full-size SUV
- Body style: 5-door crossover SUV
- Layout: Front-engine, front-motor, front-wheel drive (DM-i); Front-engine, dual-motor, all-wheel drive (DM-p); Rear-motor, rear-wheel-drive (EV); Dual-motor, four-wheel-drive (EV AWD)
- Related: BYD Seal 08; BYD Dahan; BYD Datang; BYD Tang L

Powertrain
- Engine: Petrol plug-in hybrid: 1.5 L BYD472ZQB turbo I4
- Electric motor: Permanent magnet synchronous
- Transmission: e-CVT (DM-i/DM-p)
- Hybrid drivetrain: Plug-in hybrid
- Battery: 92.09 – 115.07 kWh BYD Blade LFP (EV); 55.843 kWh BYD Blade LFP (PHEV)
- Electric range: 710–900 km (441–559 mi) (CLTC, EV); 400 km (249 mi) (CLTC, PHEV)

Dimensions
- Wheelbase: 3,030 mm (119.3 in)
- Length: 5,115 mm (201.4 in)
- Width: 1,999 mm (78.7 in)
- Height: 1,800 mm (70.9 in)
- Curb weight: 2,420–2,710 kg (5,335–5,975 lb) (PHEV); 2,420–2,710 kg (5,335–5,975 lb) (EV)

The BYD Sealion 08 (Chinese: 比亚迪海獅08; pinyin: Bǐyàdí Hǎishī 08) is a battery electric and plug-in hybrid full-size SUV produced by BYD Auto.

== Overview ==
The Sealion 08 was at BYD's Ocean Day on 15 December 2025, the Sealion 08 was officially announced alongside the Seal 08. The Sealion 08 was officially unveiled in the 2026 Beijing Auto Show on 24 April 2026, alongside its sedan counterpart - the Seal 08.

=== Design ===
The Sealion 08 retains a similar design language as the Seal 08, named "Marine Aesthetics 2.0". This includes elongated "Ice Eye" crystal DRLs featuring a dual signature, split headlights below, smooth body lines and taillights inspired by waves. Six single-tone exterior color options are available, as well as additional two-tone ones. Either 20 or 21-inch wheels are available.

Rear view

Interior

=== Interior ===
The Sealion 08's interior features a three-spoke flat bottom steering wheel, a column-mounted gear shifter, two-level ambient lighting, seashell-shaped door handles, 7.3 L (450 cu in) refrigerator, and a 25 speaker Devialet sound system. The display setup is similar to other BYD models, consisting of a 17.3-inch floating central display, 12.3-inch LCD instrument cluster, 26-inch augmented reality HUD, and a 21.4-inch rear ceiling-mounted display. It is offered in either a two-row five seat or three-row six seat configuration. In the case of the latter, the second row consists of two individual captain's chairs each equipped with heating, ventilation and massage featurse, as well as powered legrests, cupholders in the armrests, and a zero gravity mode. Five-seat versions feature an extra storage compartment below the middle seat.

The trunk capacity of five-seat and six-seat versions are 943 L (33.3 cu ft) and 317 L (11.2 cu ft) respectively with all the seats up. The latter expands to 1,173 L (41.4 cu ft) with the third row folded. Battery electric versions feature a frunk of 201 L (7.1 cu ft).

=== Features ===
It is also equipped with active rear-wheel steering that lowers the turning radius to 4.95 m (16.2 ft), dual-chamber DiSus-A air suspension, an intelligent crab walk feature, rollover prevention, and the DiPilot 5.0 driver assistance system capable of Navigate On Autopilot (NOA).

== Powertrain ==
The Sealion 08 is built on an 800-volt platform and uses the company's second-generation Blade LFP battery. In selected configurations, the battery electric version has a claimed range of up to 900 km (559 mi) (CLTC cycle) and is equipped with BYD's flash charging technology at a rate of up to 1500 kW, allowing a charge from 10%-97% in nine minutes. The plug-in hybrid version has a claimed pure-electric range of up to 400 km (249 mi).

Specifications
Model	Battery capacity	Motors						Engine		Top speed	Electric range	Kerb weight
Model	Battery capacity	Front		Rear		Combined		Power		Top speed	Electric range	Kerb weight
Model	Battery capacity	Name	Peak	Name	Peak	Power	Torque	Peak	Net	Top speed	CLTC	Kerb weight
PHEV DM-i FWD	55.843 kWh	TZ210XYD	200 kW (270 hp)			200 kW (270 hp)		154 hp (115 kW; 156 PS)	148 hp (110 kW; 150 PS)	200 km/h (124 mph)	400 km (249 mi)	2,605–2,665 kg (5,743–5,875 lb)
PHEV DM-p AWD	55.843 kWh	TZ210XYD	200 kW (270 hp)	TZ200XSAE	200 kW (270 hp)	400 kW (540 hp)		154 hp (115 kW; 156 PS)	148 hp (110 kW; 150 PS)	200 km/h (124 mph)	400 km (249 mi)	2,605–2,665 kg (5,743–5,875 lb)
EV RWD	92.09 kWh	–		TZ226QYC	320 kW (430 hp)	320 kW (430 hp)		–		240 km/h (149 mph)	710 km (441 mi)	2,420 kg (5,335 lb)
EV RWD	115.07 kWh	–		TZ226QYC	320 kW (430 hp)	320 kW (430 hp)		–		240 km/h (149 mph)	900 km (559 mi)	2,595 kg (5,721 lb)
EV AWD	115.07 kWh	YS230XYF	215 kW (288 hp)	TZ226QYD	370 kW (500 hp)	585 kW (784 hp)		–		250 km/h (155 mph)	810 km (503 mi)	2,765–2,710 kg (6,096–5,975 lb)

== See also ==
- List of BYD Auto vehicles
