= Fengon 380 =

Compact MPV

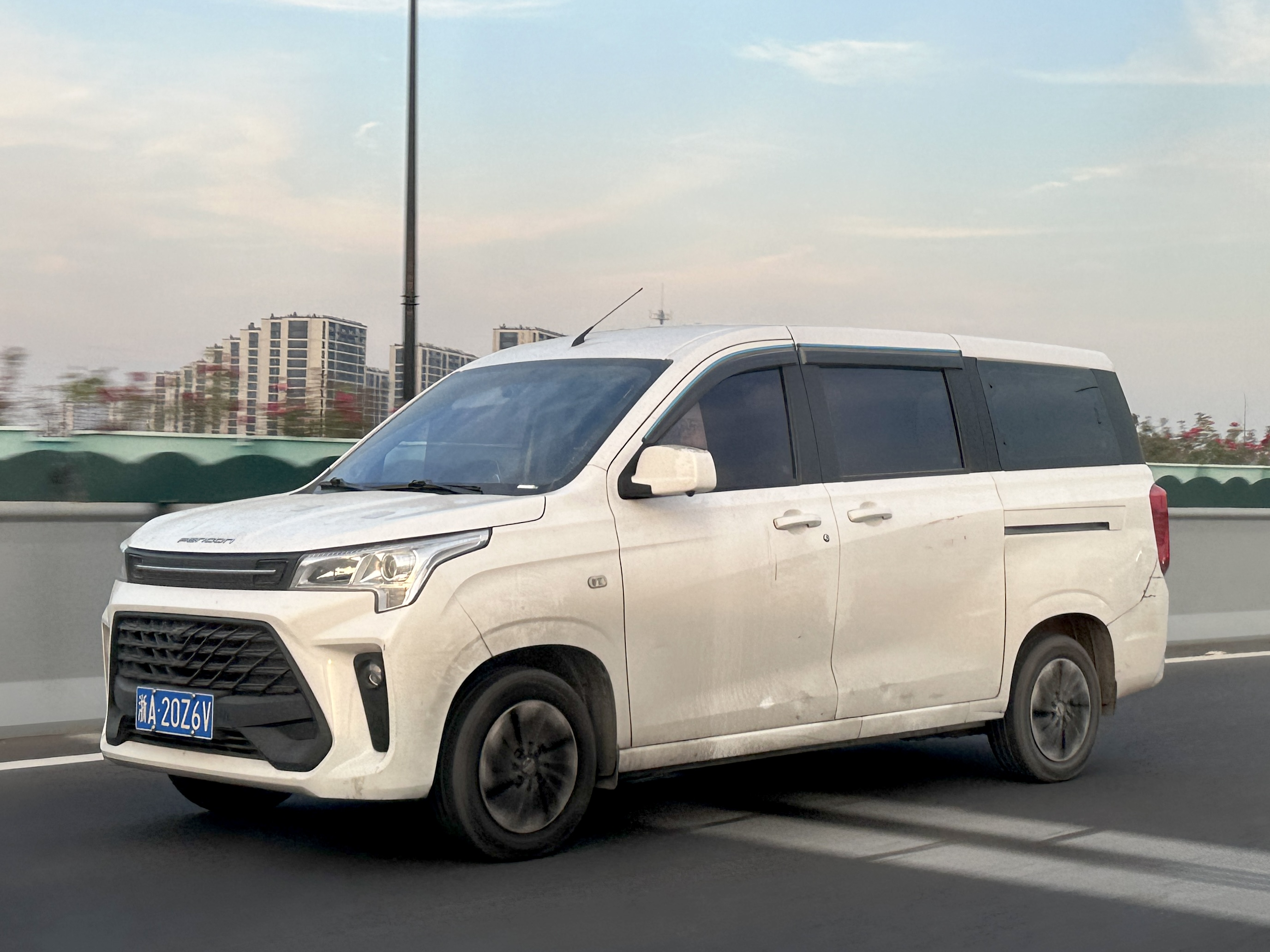

Overview
- Manufacturer: DFSK Motor
- Also called: Sokon EC55; DFSK A380 Winmax (Taiwan)
- Production: 2022–present
- Assembly: China; Taiwan (FAC)

Body and chassis
- Class: Compact MPV
- Body style: 5-door minivan
- Layout: Front engine, rear wheel drive

Powertrain
- Engine: Petrol: 1.5 L I4; 2.0 L I4
- Transmission: 5-speed manual 6-speed manual

Dimensions
- Wheelbase: 2,850 mm (112.2 in)
- Length: 4,610 mm (181.5 in)
- Width: 1,750 mm (68.9 in)
- Height: 1,860 mm (73.2 in)
- Curb weight: 1,230 kg (2,712 lb)

Chronology
- Predecessor: Fengon 330S

The Fengon 380 is a compact MPV produced by Chinese auto maker Dongfeng-Sokon (DFSK), a subsidiary of Dongfeng Motor Co., Ltd.

== Overview ==
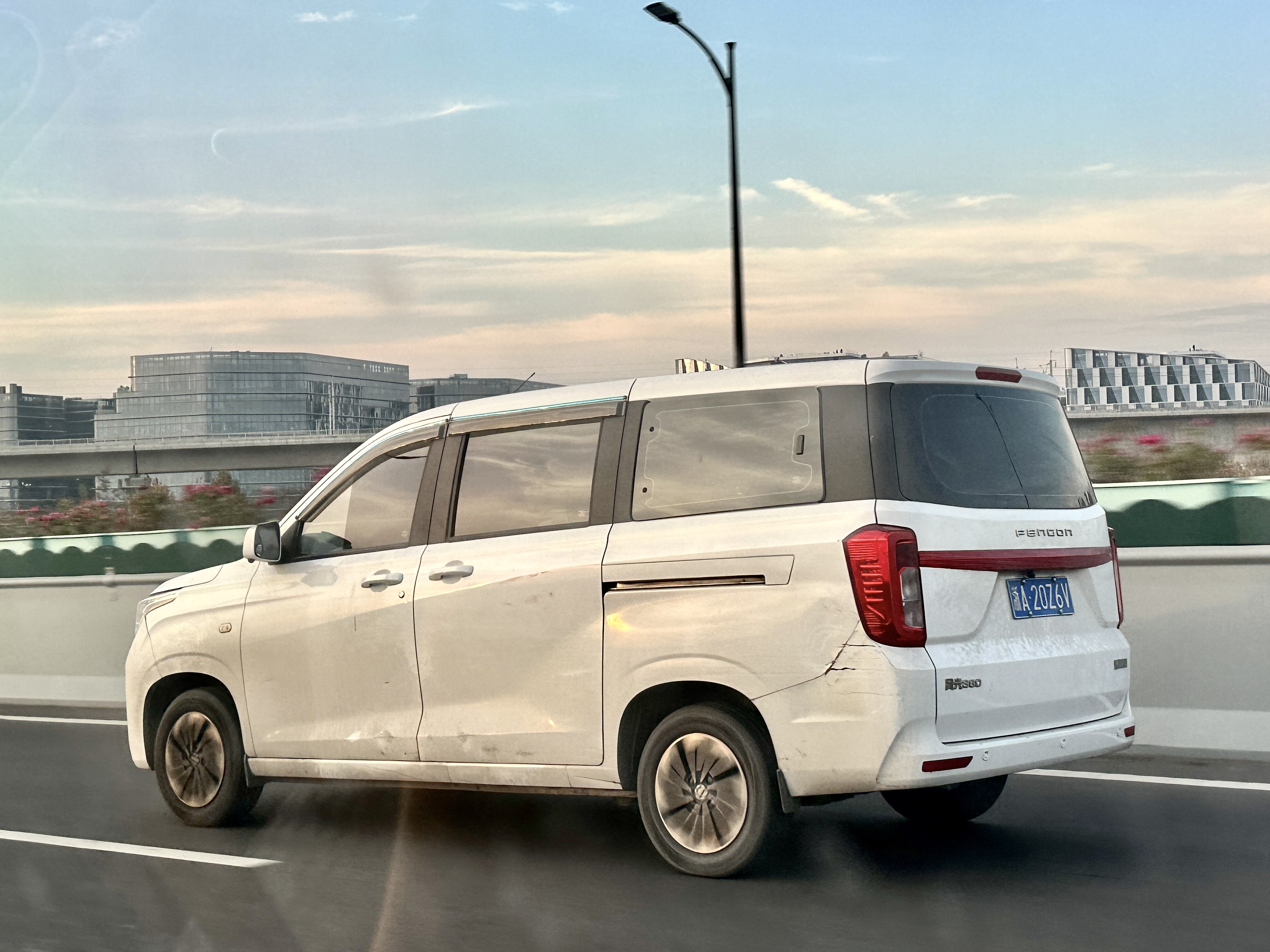
Rear view

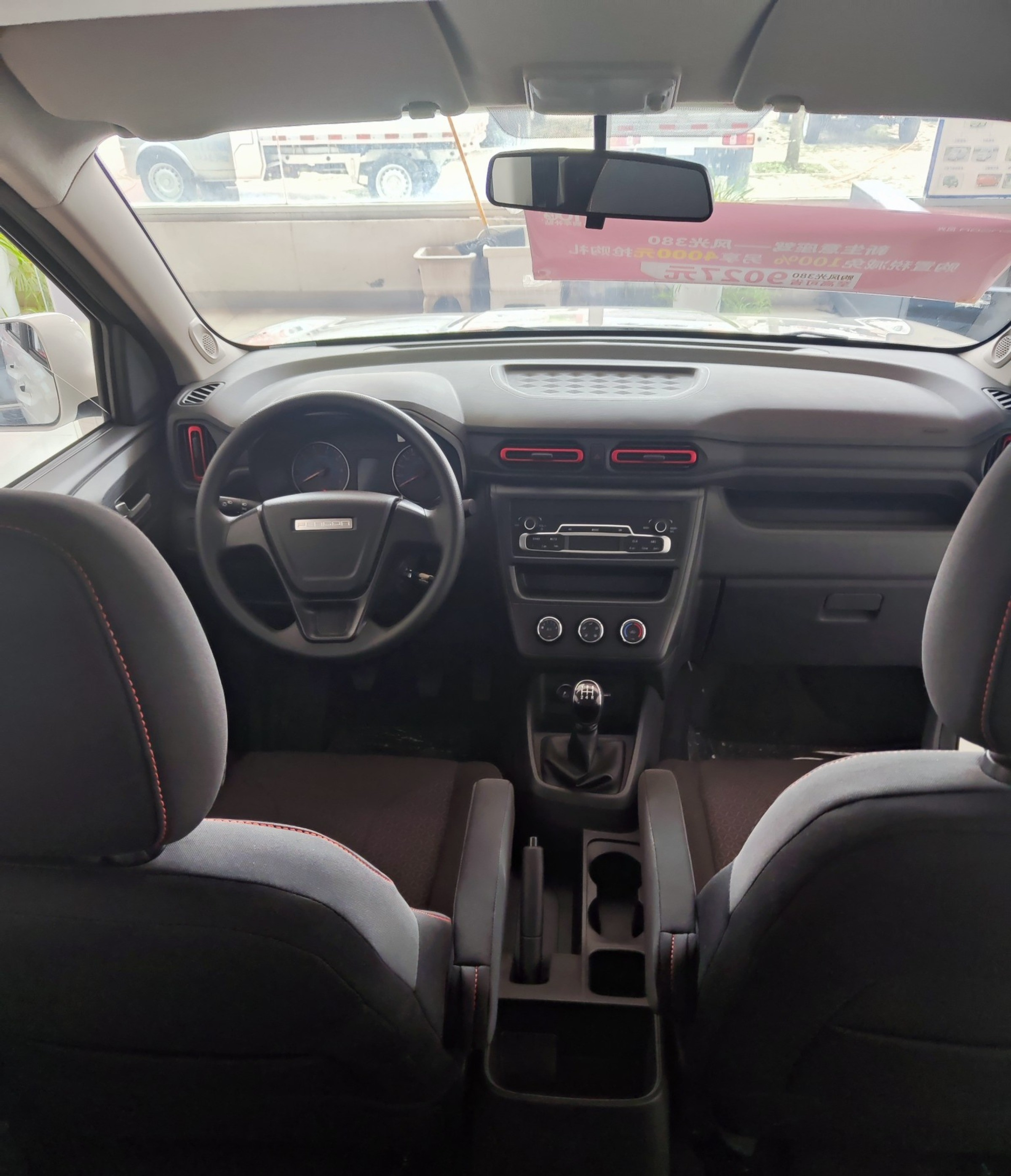
Interior

The Fengon 380 was launched on the Chinese car market in June 2022 as a 5 to 8-seater compact MPV. The Fengon 380 is powered by a 1.5 liter inline-4 engine developing 112 hp and a 2.0 liter inline-4 engine developing 143 hp. Transmission options include a 5-speed manual transmission and a 6-speed manual transmission option.

== Fengon E380 ==
The Fengon E380 is the electric variant of the 380. The E380 is equipped with a set of 42.336kWh blade batteries with a CLTC pure electric range of 310 km. Additionally, the E380 also supports DC fast charging and V2L power output.

== Ruichi EC55 ==
The Ruichi EC55 is another electric variant of the 380. The Ruichi EC55 is equipped with a set of 38.64kWh or 41.85kWh batteries with a NEDC pure electric range of 295 km or 361 km. Additionally, the E380 also supports DC fast charging and V2L power output.
