= Electric vehicle motors =

Electric vehicle motors convert battery energy into kinetic energy. Engineers call them traction motors. They deliver instant torque, run quietly, and reach energy conversion efficiencies above 90 percent in many cases. Designers focus on power density (output per kilogram), torque per unit volume, efficiency across speeds, and production cost. Four companies stand out for advances: YASA (now part of Mercedes), Lucid Motors, Rivian (especially the 2026 R2), and Tesla. Their approaches highlight trade-offs between raw performance and everyday efficiency.

== History ==
Electric motors powered the first road vehicles in the late 1800s. Early designs used direct current motors with lead-acid batteries. Ferdinand Porsche built a hybrid electric car in 1901. Production electric cars faded after 1920 as internal combustion engines improved. Modern interest returned in the 1990s. General Motors released the EV1 in 1996 with a single induction motor. Tesla launched its Roadster in 2008. That car used an alternating current induction motor derived from earlier aerospace work. The design proved rugged and avoided rare earth magnets. It set a benchmark for performance, but consumed more energy at low speeds. Permanent magnet motors gained favor in the 2010s for better low-speed efficiency. Manufacturers balanced magnet cost against range gains. By the 2020s axial flux designs appeared in high-performance vehicles. Mercedes acquired YASA in 2021 to accelerate that technology.

== Motor types ==
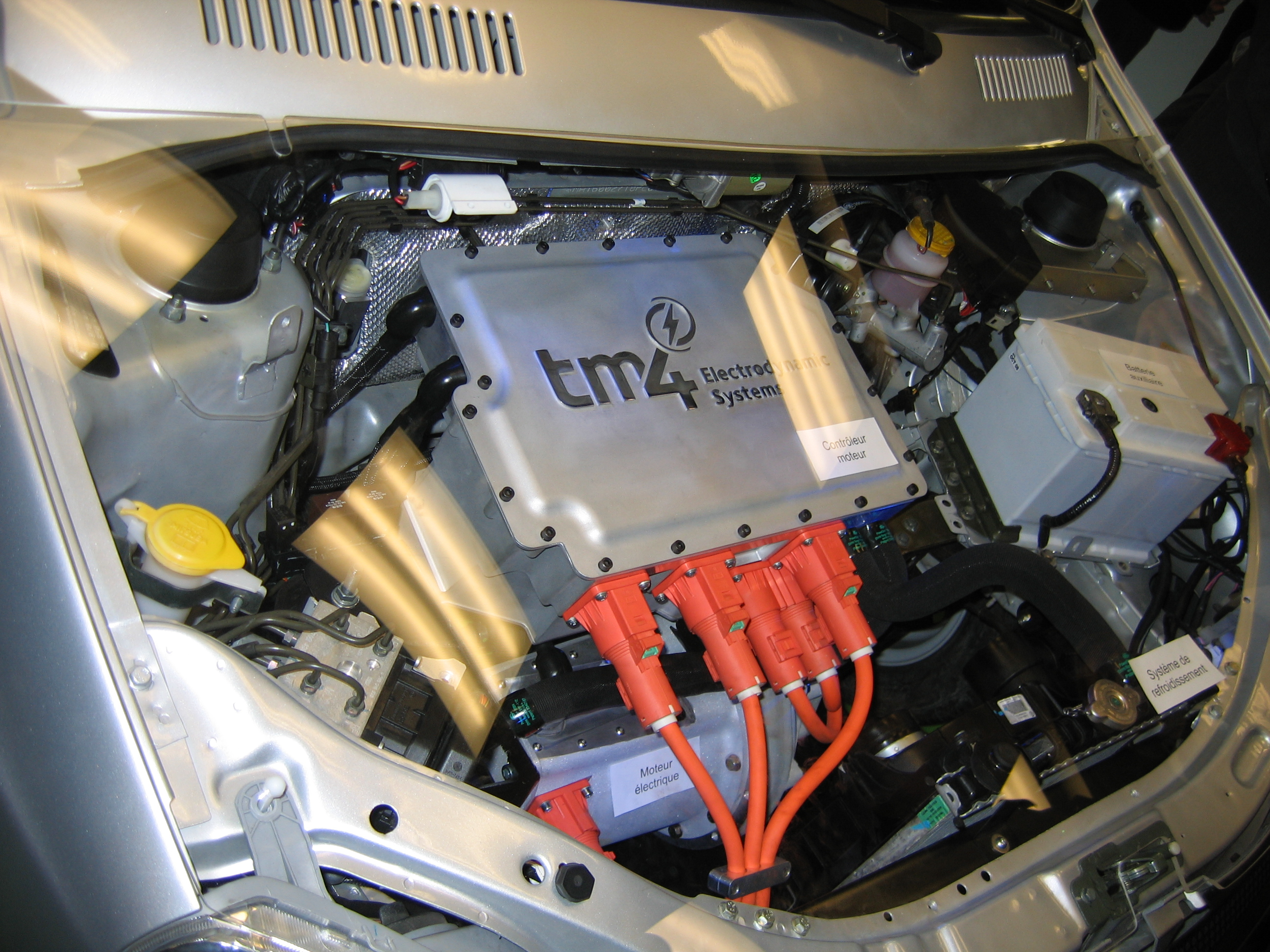
An electric motor in a car's engine bay

Most electric vehicle motors are distinguished by flux path. Radial flux motors dominate production. The stator forms a cylinder around the rotor. Magnetic flux travels outward from the center. These motors suit high-volume manufacturing. They achieve good efficiency and power, but grow heavier and longer with increasing torque. Axial flux motors arrange the rotor and stator in facing discs. Flux travels parallel to the shaft. The design creates a larger active surface area in a shorter package. Torque benefits from greater radius without added length. Manufacturers report up to four times the torque density and double the power density of equivalent radial motors. Cooling improves because oil contacts more surface directly. Axial motors weigh less and occupy less space. Advantages allow smaller batteries or better vehicle packaging. Permanent magnets appear in most modern designs. They create a constant field without extra current, boosting efficiency. Induction rotors use no magnets. Current in the stator induces opposing fields in the rotor bars. The approach avoids rare earth materials and allows easy field weakening at high speeds, but it runs less efficiently at low loads.

== Makers ==
=== BYD ===
BYD designs and manufactures its own electric motors, producing batteries, semiconductors, motors, and software. This approach cuts costs and improves efficiency.

The e-Platform 3.0 underpins many BYD electric vehicles. It integrates an 8-in-1 electric drive system: vehicle control unit, battery management system, traction motor, onboard charger, and more. System efficiency reaches up to 89 percent. BYD introduced a high-speed motor in 2025 as part of the Super e-Platform. The motor reaches 30,000 revolutions per minute, the first mass-produced unit at that speed. It boosts power density, reduces size and weight, and supports speeds over 300 kilometres per hour. A single-module single-motor setup delivers 580 kilowatts (778 horsepower). Recent models use updated motors. The 2026 Atto 3 EVO features a rear-wheel-drive motor with 230 kilowatts. Dual-motor versions produce higher output. Flagship vehicles like the Tang 9 use tri-motor setups with over 500 kilowatts combined.

BYD motors emphasise affordability and efficiency for mass-market vehicles. Permanent magnet synchronous designs dominate. High-speed rotors and integrated systems reduce energy loss. 2025 patents employed variable flux mechanisms to improve highway efficiency by up to 10 percent.

=== Helix ===
The Helix SPX242-94 is a high-performance radial flux motor developed by British manufacturer Helix. The motor delivers a peak output of 368 kW (approximately 500 hp) and 500 Nm of torque. It weighs 33 kg (73 lb), yielding a power density exceeding 11 kW/kg. Helix designed the SPX242-94 specifically for Spéirling's, single-seater layout.

=== Lucid Motors ===
Lucid Motors targets overall vehicle efficiency rather than peak motor power alone. The company designs radial flux permanent magnet motors optimised for minimal energy loss. In 2026 EPA testing the 2026 Lucid Air Pure RWD earned 146 MPGe, the highest for any production electric vehicle in the US. Engineers credit the motor and integrated drive unit. The motor weighs about 30 kilograms and produces over 500 kilowatts in top versions. Torque density exceeds 20 newton-metres per kilogram and power density tops 15 kilowatts per kilogram. Key innovations focus on the stator, including square copper wire for higher slot fill, hairpin windings for automated production, and precise thermal management. The drive unit combines the motor, planetary gears, differential, and cooling in one housing. This reduces parts, weight, and friction. Efficiency stays high across a wide speed range. The motor achieved peak efficiency values above 97 percent in laboratory tests. Lucid supplies powertrains to Aston Martin. The focus on efficiency lets the company use smaller batteries without sacrificing range. Lower battery mass reduces cost and improves dynamics.

=== Rivian ===
Rivian launched the R2 mid-size sport utility vehicle for production in the first half of 2026. The model uses permanent magnet motors on each axle. Dual-motor all-wheel drive versions produce 656 horsepower and 609 pound-feet of torque. Tri-motor configurations add a second rear motor for quicker acceleration below 3.0 seconds to 60 miles per hour. Permanent magnet motors help maintain efficiency in daily driving. The design balances performance with affordability. Motor integration follows Rivian’s in-house approach. The company manufactures drive units at its Georgia plant. Details remain limited before full production, but prototypes exceeded internal targets for refinement and range.

=== Tesla ===
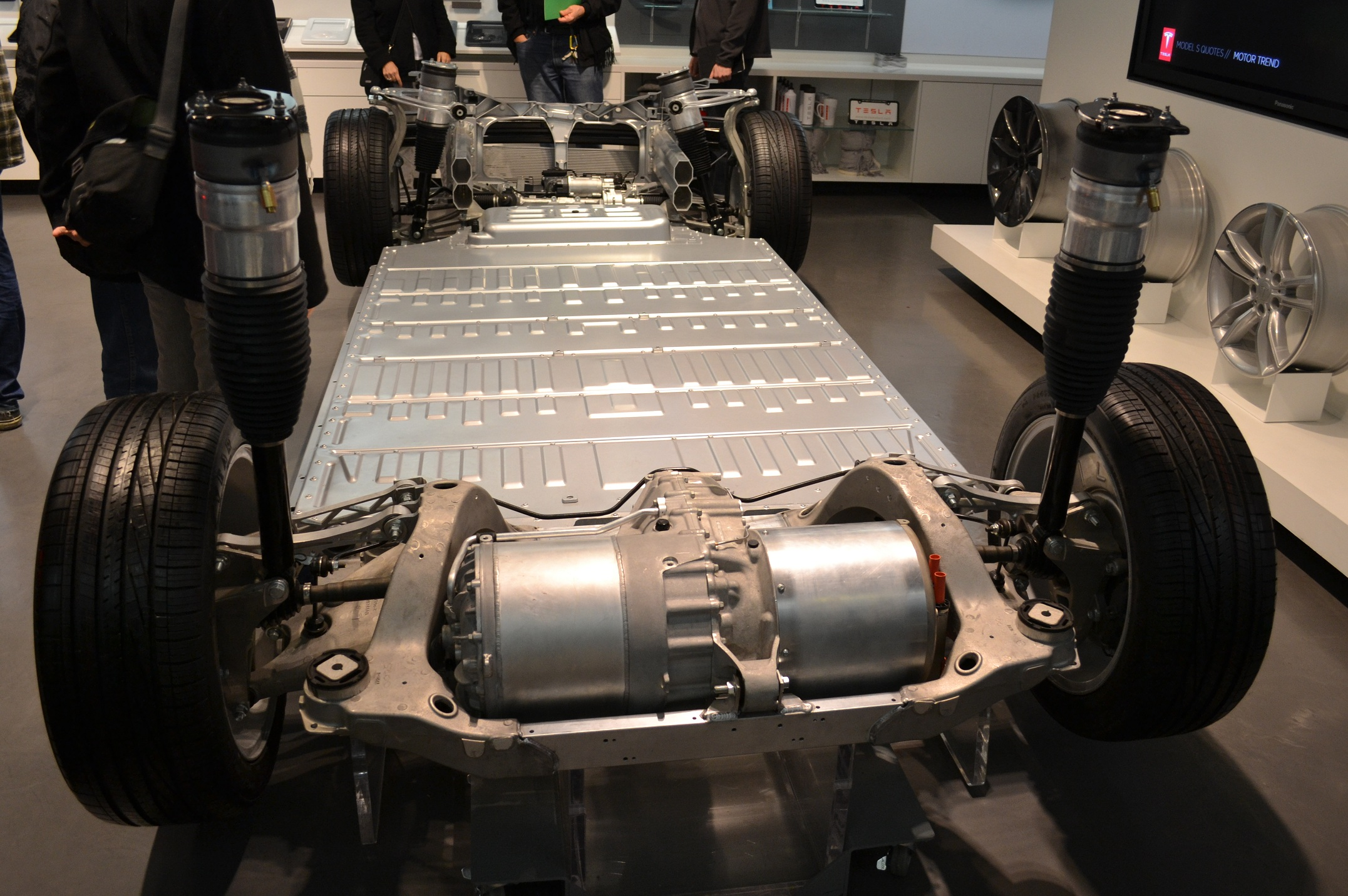
Tesla Motors Model S base showing motor and battery

Early Tesla models such as the 2008 Roadster and initial Model S relied on used alternating current induction motors. Induction motors tolerate high temperatures and speeds well. They need no rare earth magnets.

Tesla switched the Model 3 rear motor to a permanent magnet design in 2017. The Model Y dual motor configurations do the same.

Plaid PMMs increase the maximum RPMs of the rotor by wrapping it in carbon fiber, which holds the magnets in place without the metal bridges that increase magnetic flux leakage. A single motor in the 2025 Model 3 Performance now exceeds earlier Plaid outputs in some metrics.

=== YASA/Mercedes ===
YASA Limited developed axial flux motors from research at Oxford University. Founder Tim Woolmer started the company in 2009. The name stands for Yokeless and Segmented Armature. The design removes the stator yoke to cut iron mass by up to 80 percent. Segmented coils simplify winding and reduce copper use. Early versions powered the Ferrari SF90 Stradale hybrid supercar. Mercedes acquired YASA in July 2021. The British team kept its brand and continued supplying other makers while focusing on Mercedes-AMG performance models. YASA motors deliver up to 800 newton-metres of torque. A 2025 prototype produced 550 kilowatts (737 horsepower) from 13.1 kilograms, reaching 42 kilowatts per kilogram. Later that year engineers hit 750 kilowatts from 12.7 kilograms for a record 59 kilowatts per kilogram. The motors run continuously at 75% of peak power thanks to direct oil cooling. Radial equivalents often drop to half their peak under sustained load. Mercedes plans series production in 2026. The AMG GT XX concept uses three YASA motors: two at the rear in a high-performance drive unit and one at the front for boost and regeneration. The flat shape lets engineers place motors closer to the wheels or integrate them into compact axles. Reduced weight improves handling and range. YASA claims the technology adds 5 to 10 percent efficiency over radial designs in typical driving.

=== Zeekr ===
Zeekr offers a motor housed in a rare-earth magnesium alloy. Load-bearing structural parts, including the motor housing, reducer housing, inverter upper housing, and end covers, use the alloy instead of aluminum. This reduces motor weight by 22%, totaling 77 kg (170 lb). The alloy reduces noise, vibration, and harshness (NVH) by 8 dB. The motor can reach 22,000 rpm without significant cabin noise.

== Performance comparison ==
Axial flux motors from YASA lead in power and torque density. A 12.7-kilogram unit produces 750 kilowatts. That suits supercars and allows novel packaging. Radial flux motors from Lucid, Rivian, and Tesla win on production scale and cost. Lucid achieves the highest real-world efficiency at 146 MPGe. Tesla balances performance and volume. Rivian focuses on durability for off-road use. Efficiency matters most for daily drivers. A 1 percent gain adds roughly 5 to 10 miles of range in a typical vehicle. Weight savings compound that benefit. Axial designs cut motor mass by half in some comparisons, allowing smaller batteries or better handling. Cost remains a factor. Permanent magnets use rare earth elements. Prices fluctuate. Induction and reluctance designs reduce that exposure. All four companies invest in magnet recycling and alternative materials.

Efficiency typically refers to peak motor efficiency (often 95-98% for modern permanent magnet designs). Torque density uses newton-metres per kilogram (Nm/kg) where calculable or reported; otherwise noted as approximate or unavailable.

| u | Motor type | Weight | Power density | Torque density | HP | Efficiency |
|---|---|---|---|---|---|---|
| YASA (Mercedes) | Axial flux permanent magnet | 12.7 kg (prototype) | 59 kW/kg (peak) | ~4× radial equivalents (up to ~800 Nm total) | >1,000 hp (750 kW peak) | ~97% (estimated, high due to design) |
| Lucid Motors | Radial flux permanent magnet (drive unit) | ~74 kg (163 lb per motor/drive unit) | ~9 hp/kg (~6.7 kW/kg per motor) | High (proprietary, >20 Nm/kg estimated) | 670 hp (per motor) | >97% (peak, lab) |
| Rivian (R2) | Radial flux permanent magnet (dual-motor AWD) | Unavailable (integrated unit) | Unavailable | Unavailable | 656 hp (combined) | >90% (typical PM) |
| Tesla (Model 3/Performance variants) | Radial flux permanent magnet (rear) / induction (some) | Unavailable (per motor ~80-100 kg estimated drive unit) | Unavailable (high in recent designs) | Unavailable | ~500+ hp (Performance single motor equiv.) | ~97% (peak PM) |
| BYD (Super e-Platform high-speed) | Radial flux permanent magnet (30,000+ rpm) | Unavailable (lightweight design) | 16.4 kW/kg | Unavailable | 778 hp (580 kW peak, rear) | High (~95-97% estimated) |
| Zeekr | Permanent magnet synchronous motor (22,000 rpm) | 77 kg (motor + gearbox + housing) | Unavailable | Unavailable | Unavailable | Unavailable |

Notes:

- YASA's figures are from 2025 prototypes (record power density for axial flux).
- Lucid emphasizes integrated drive units; per-motor weight/power shown.
- Rivian and Tesla data limited to vehicle-level; individual motor specs proprietary or not fully public.
- BYD's high-rpm motor focuses on power density for mass production.
- Torque density often proprietary; YASA claims significant advantages from axial design.
- Efficiency varies by operating point; peaks cited. For precise applications, consult manufacturer datasheets, as specs evolve rapidly in this field.

== See also ==
- Electric motor
- Axial flux motor
- Radial flux motor
  - Induction motor
  - Permanent magnet motor
- Electric vehicle
