= BYD Han L =

Full-size sedan

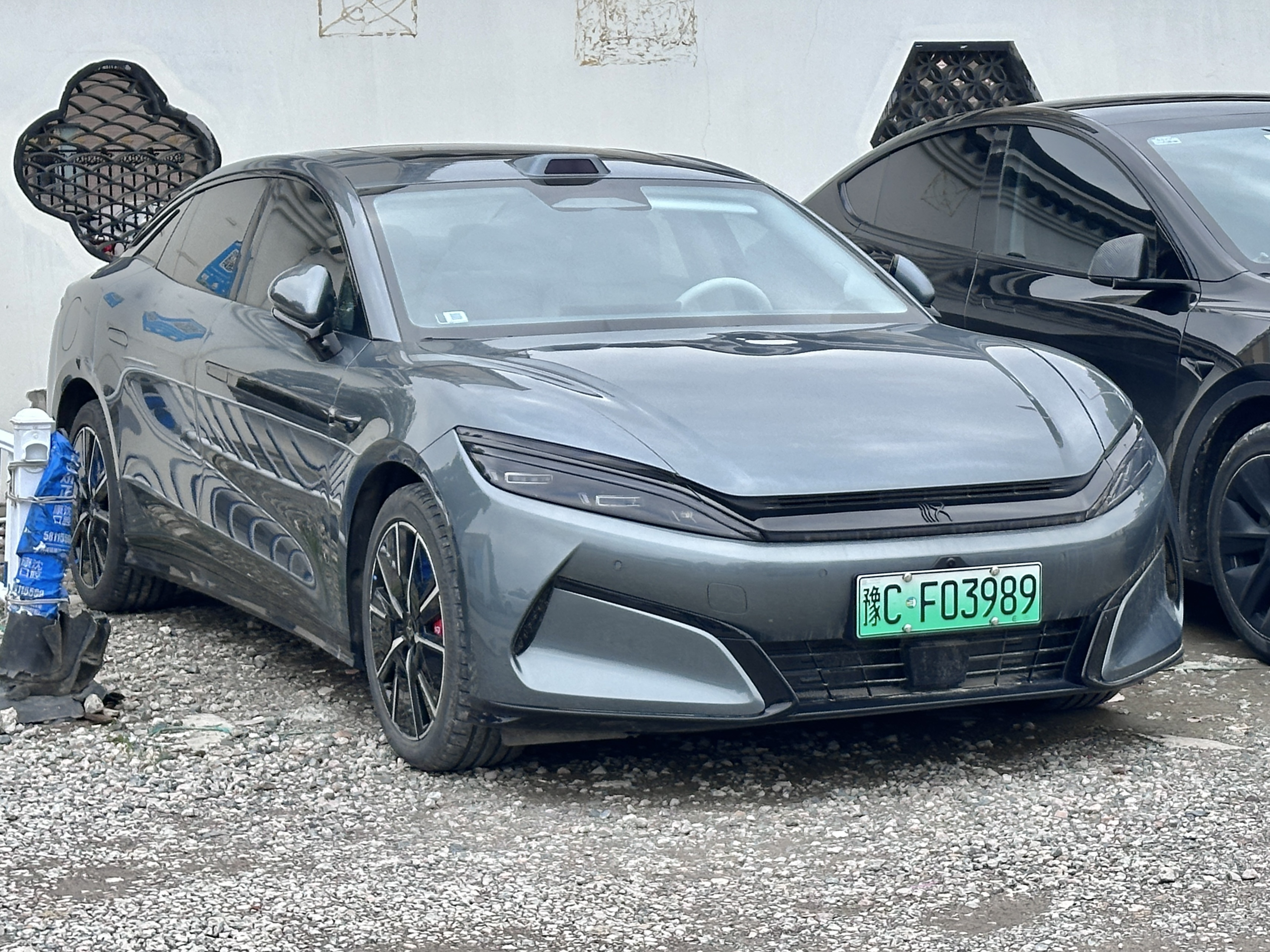

Overview
- Manufacturer: BYD Auto
- Model code: HC2H (DM-i/DM-p); HC2E (EV)
- Production: 2025–present
- Model years: 2025 (China)
- Assembly: China: Shenzhen, Guangdong
- Designer: Under the lead of Wolfgang Egger

Body and chassis
- Class: Full-size car (E-segment)
- Body style: 4-door sedan
- Layout: Front-engine, front-motor, front-wheel drive (DM-i); Front-engine, dual-motor, all-wheel drive (DM-p); Rear-motor, rear-wheel-drive (EV); Dual-motor, four-wheel-drive (EV AWD)
- Platform: DM-i 5.0 platform (DM-i); Super e platform (EV)
- Related: BYD Datang; BYD Tang L

Powertrain
- Engine: Petrol plug-in hybrid: 1.5 L BYD472ZQB I4 turbo (DM-i/DM-p)
- Electric motor: Permanent magnet synchronous
- Transmission: E-CVT (DM-i/DM-p)
- Hybrid drivetrain: Plug-in hybrid (DM-i/DM-p)
- Battery: 29.5 kWh BYD Blade LFP (DM-i/DM-p); 82.4 kWh BYD Blade LFP (EV)
- Electric range: 145–170 km (90–106 mi) (DM-i/DM-p); 601–701 km (373–436 mi) (EV)
- Plug-in charging: DC: 1000 kW (EV)

Dimensions
- Wheelbase: 2,970 mm (116.9 in)
- Length: 5,050 mm (198.8 in)
- Width: 1,960 mm (77.2 in)
- Height: 1,505 mm (59.3 in)
- Curb weight: 1,964–2,466 kg (4,330–5,437 lb)

The BYD Han L (Chinese: 比亚迪汉L) is a full-size sedan manufactured by BYD Auto since 2025. It is available with battery electric (EV) and plug-in hybrid (DM-i) powertrains. It is part of the BYD Han series.

== Overview ==
The Han L is 10 mm (0.4 in) longer, 50 mm (2.0 in) wider, and 10 mm (0.4 in) taller than the standard Han.

The Han L was first unveiled on 17 January 2025 alongside the related Tang L, with technical details revealed and pre-orders opening on 17 March, with the launch expected in early April. It is positioned and priced above the existing BYD Han, while the previous Han continues to be offered as a cheaper model. The vehicle is also expected to launch in overseas markets following its domestic release.

=== Design ===
The Han L is described by BYD as a "carrier" of Chinese culture, reflecting the Dynasty Series emphasis on integrating traditional Chinese aesthetics into vehicle design. Designed under the lead BYD's global design director Wolfgang Egger, the model incorporates the "Loong Face" design language that replaced the previous "Dragon Face". Some design elements are chosen for its cultural significance, such as its taillights inspired by a "Phoenix wings", along with details such as the "dragon mustache" chrome element on the front end and brushstroke-shaped D-pillars.

The interior of the Han L is also claimed to incorporate influences from traditional Chinese clothing and other cultural elements. Some materials inside adopts bamboo-wood fusion texture.

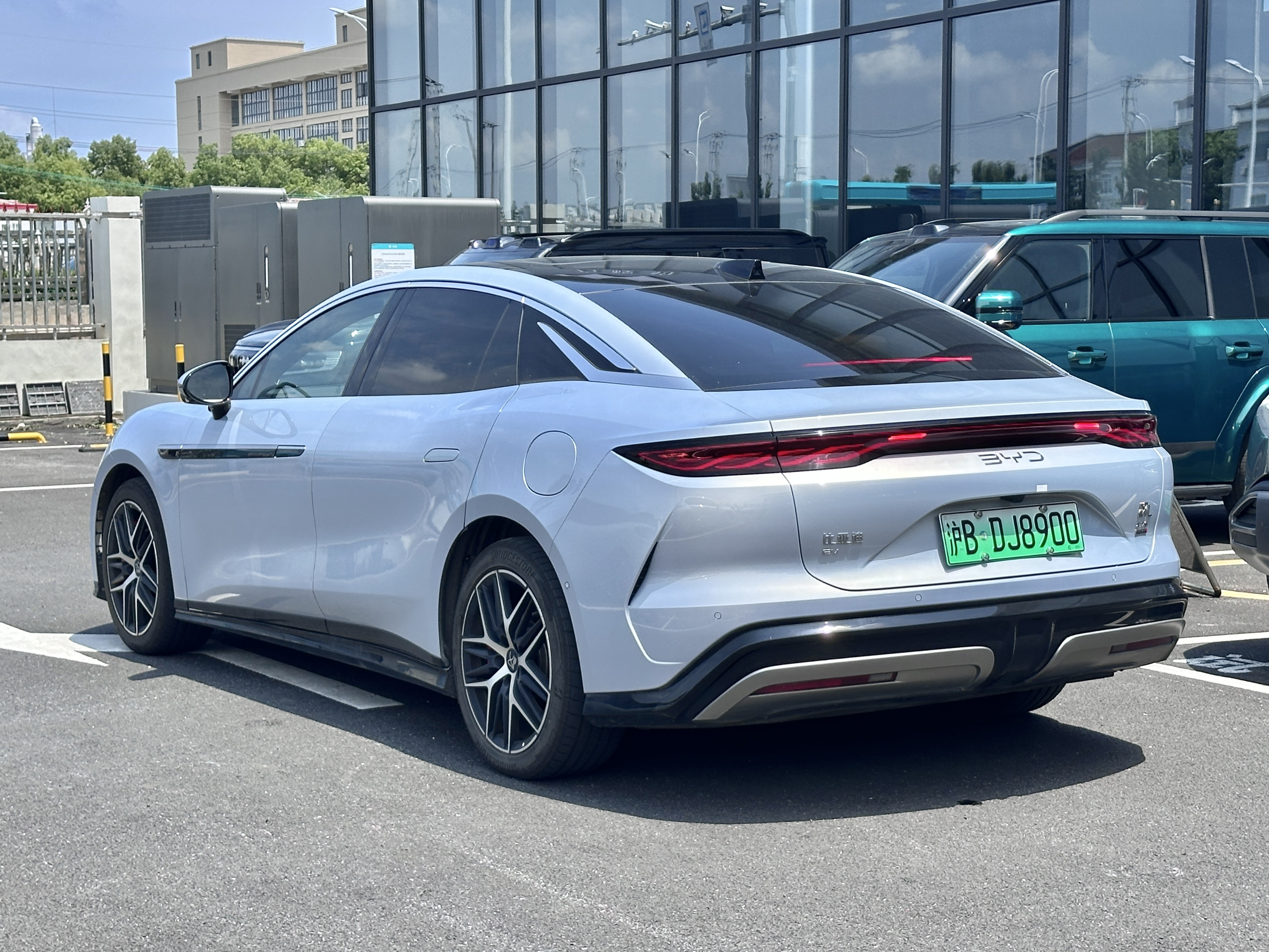
Rear view

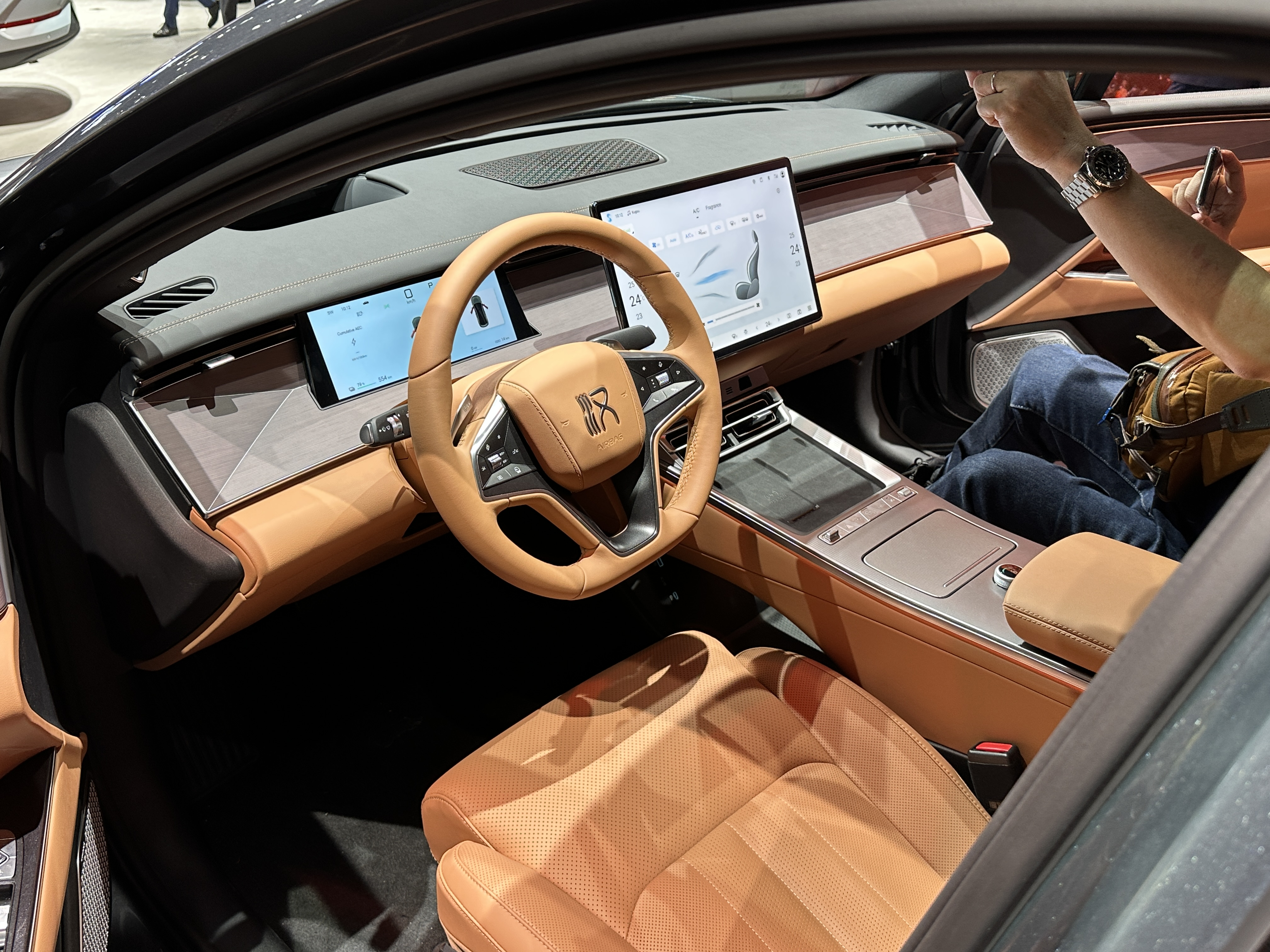
Interior

=== Equipment ===
The model is equipped with a refrigerator, fragrance system, wireless charging, and Dynaudio speakers. It offers 1,531 mm (60.3 in) front-row shoulder space and 1,484 mm (58.4 in) shoulder space for the rear passengers.

The EV variants of the Han L introduces BYD's Super e-platform, which use a new blade battery design capable of 10C charging at a peak rate of 1000 kW, allowing it to gain 400 kilometres (250 mi) of range within five minutes.

The model will also receive BYD's God's Eye B ADAS system, which utilizes a roof-mounted LiDAR sensor.

== Powertrain ==
The Han L offers two powertrain options, battery electric and plug-in hybrid.

The electric variant is based on BYD's newest Super e platform with the blade battery using a 945 V electrical architecture. Additionally, it is equipped with 1,500 V silicon carbide semiconductors used to power the motors. It is available in single-motor and dual-motor configurations, with maximum outputs of 500 kW (671 hp; 680 PS) and 810 kW (1,086 hp; 1,101 PS), respectively.

The dual-motor variant includes a 230 kW (308 hp; 313 PS) front motor and a rear motor with a peak output of 580 kW (778 hp; 789 PS) and 450 N⋅m (332 lb⋅ft) of torque, which has a peak RPM of 30,500. It produces 524 kW (703 hp; 712 PS) at 30,000 RPM, and has a sustained rating of 300 kW (402 hp; 408 PS) and 225 N⋅m (166 lb⋅ft) or torque. The rear motor is the world's second most powerful electric motor ever produced, after the Koenigsegg Gemera, and has a power density of 16.4 kW/kg, which BYD says is the highest in the industry. The dual-motor version is capable of reaching 100 km/h (62 mph) from a stop in 2.7 seconds, 100–200 km/h (62–124 mph) in 4.74 seconds, and has a top speed of 305 km/h (190 mph).

Power is supplied by a FinDreams 83.2 kWh LFP battery pack which supports dual-dispenser 1000 kW DC charging. This allows the pack to charge from 16-80% in 10 minutes, or 16-100% at −30 °C (−22 °F) in 24 minutes. Single-motor variants have a CLTC range rating of 701 kilometres (436 mi), while dual-motor models are capable of 601 kilometres (373 mi).

The plug-in hybrid Han L is available in DM-i and DM-p variants. The DM-i version pairs a 1.5-litre turbocharged petrol engine producing 115 kW (154 hp; 156 PS) with an electric motor delivering 200 kW (268 hp; 272 PS), while the DM-p variant adds an additional 200 kW (268 hp; 272 PS) motor. It is equipped with a 29.5 kWh LFP FinDreams battery pack, allowing for CLTC fully electric range ratings of 170 kilometres (106 mi) and 145 kilometres (90 mi) for the DM-i and DM-p versions, respectively.

0–100 km/h (0–62 mph) acceleration times range from 2.7 seconds for the EV model to 3.9 seconds for the DM-p version.

Model	Battery		Power				Range
Model	Type	Weight	Engine	Front	Rear	Total	Range
EV RWD	83.2 kWh LFP	640 kg (1,411 lb)	—	—	500 kW (671 hp; 680 PS)		701 km (436 mi)
EV AWD	83.2 kWh LFP	640 kg (1,411 lb)	—	230 kW (308 hp; 313 PS)	580 kW (778 hp; 789 PS)	810 kW (1,086 hp; 1,101 PS)	601 km (373 mi)
DM-i	29.5 kWh LFP	266 kg (586 lb)	1.5 L turbo 115 kW (154 hp; 156 PS)	—	200 kW (268 hp; 272 PS)		170 km (106 mi)
DM-p	29.5 kWh LFP	266 kg (586 lb)	1.5 L turbo 115 kW (154 hp; 156 PS)	200 kW (268 hp; 272 PS)		400 kW (536 hp; 544 PS)	145 km (90 mi)

== Sales ==
Year	China		
Year	Han L DM	Han L EV	Total
2025	8,267	18,090	26,357
