= BYD Datang =

Full-size crossover SUV

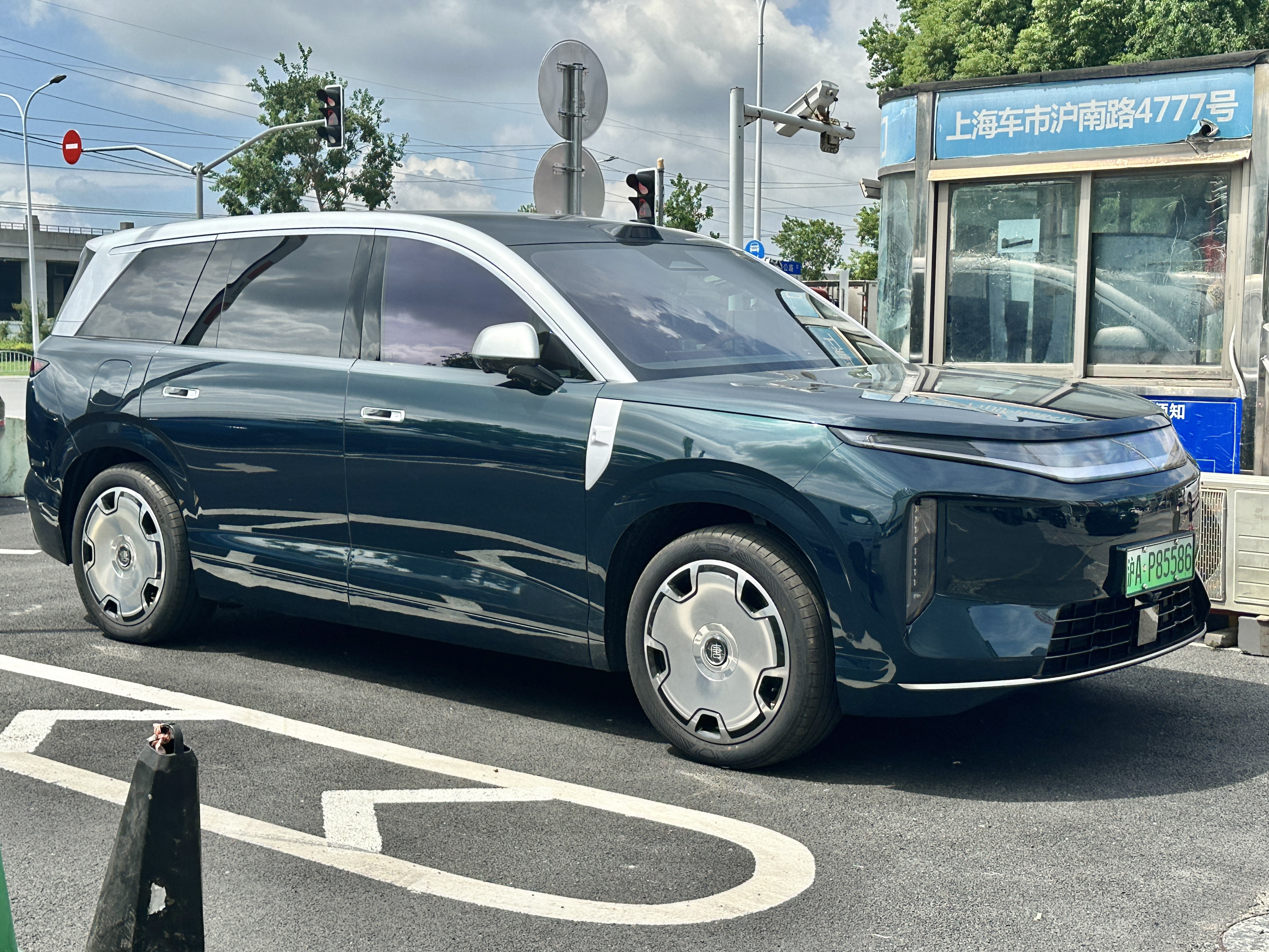

Overview
- Manufacturer: BYD Auto
- Production: 2026–present
- Assembly: China
- Designer: Under the lead of Wolfgang Egger

Body and chassis
- Class: Full-size SUV
- Body style: 5-door crossover SUV
- Layout: EV: Rear-motor, rear-wheel-drive; Dual-motor, all-wheel-drive; PHEV: Front-engine, dual-motor, all-wheel-drive
- Platform: Super e-Platform
- Related: BYD Dahan; BYD Tang (third generation); BYD Han L; BYD Tang L; BYD Sealion 08; Denza N9; Fangchengbao Ti7

Powertrain
- Engine: Petrol plug-in hybrid: 1.5 L BYD472ZQB turbo I4
- Power output: EV: 402 hp (300 kW; 408 PS); 496 hp (370 kW; 503 PS); 784 hp (585 kW; 795 PS) (AWD); PHEV: 510 hp (380 kW; 517 PS)
- Hybrid drivetrain: Series-parallel plug-in hybrid
- Battery: Lithium iron phosphate
- Electric range: 528–590 mi (850–950 km)

Dimensions
- Wheelbase: 3,130 mm (123.2 in)
- Length: 5,263–5,302 mm (207.2–208.7 in)
- Width: 1,999 mm (78.7 in)
- Height: 1,790–1,800 mm (70.5–70.9 in)
- Curb weight: 2,640–2,970 kg (5,820–6,548 lb)

The BYD Datang (Chinese: 比亚迪大唐; lit. 'Great Tang'), alternatively known in English as the BYD Great Tang, is a battery electric and plug-in hybrid full-size SUV produced by BYD Auto. It is the flagship model of BYD's Dynasty line of models.

== Overview ==
The Datang was previewed by the BYD Dynasty-D concept introduced at the 2025 Shanghai Auto Show on April 29, 2025. The Dynasty-D concept previewing the Datang has suicide doors. The side profile of the Datang uses hidden door handles and chrome window trim. A LiDAR sensor is also mounted above the windshield. Because of the presence of a LiDAR sensor it is believed that the Datang will use BYD's latest God's Eye advanced driver-assistance system. As with the Tang series the model is a part of, the Datang is part of BYD's Dynasty series. It is expected to cost between 200,000 and 300,000 yuan (28,700 to 43,000 USD) and will enter the entry-level luxury market. The first spyshots of the Datang surfaced in July 2025.

Initially expected to launch at the end of 2025, the Datang's launch date was pushed back to the second quarter of 2026 after an internal schedule adjustment was done for the Dynasty Network. The Datang will offer both 6-seat (2+2+2) and 7-seat (2+2+3) seating arrangements.

At the teaser for the model on January 10, 2026, BYD mentioned that a naming contest will also be held to determine the car's official name, with the two most likely options being Tang 9 and Datang.

On March 3, 2026, The BYD released the first official photos of the Datang.

It was officially revealed during BYD's Technology Day on March 5, 2026. The Datang will go on sale during the 2026 Beijing Auto Show.

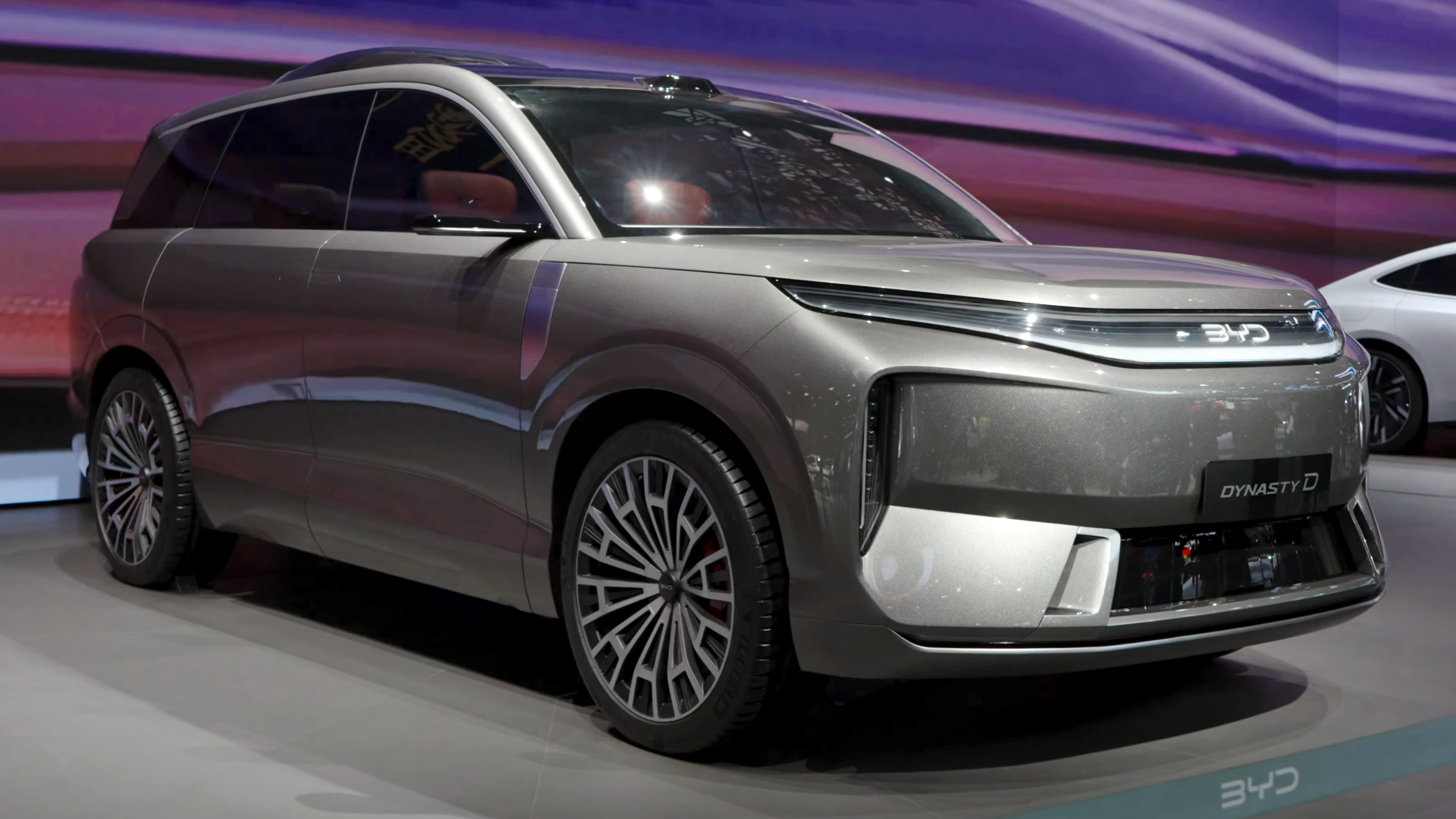
The BYD Dynasty-D concept introduced at Auto Shanghai 2025 directly previewed the Datang.

=== Design ===
The Datang uses the BYD Dynasty series' dragon face design language. A continuous daytime running light strip spans the front and is paired with vertical headlamps as well as a chrome-accented lower trapezoidal grille. Another continuous light strip is also used at the back. A range of exterior color options, including two-tone options are available. It is offered with either multi-spoke or monoblock wheels.

The interior features leather upholstery, real wood and a three-screen setup consisting of a 12.3-inch driver display, 17.3-inch central display and 12.3-inch central display. The rear cabin features a built-in refrigerator, roof-mounted entertainment display and tray tables. The second-row seats have a zero-gravity function and are able to recline up to 146 degrees, while leg rests can raise up to 70 degrees. It also features an acoustic and laminated sunroof with an area of 2.52 m^{2} (3,910 sq in), which is equipped with a fully hidden sunshade operating within a 3-layer structure.

The Datang is offered in a 2+2+3 7-seat configuration.

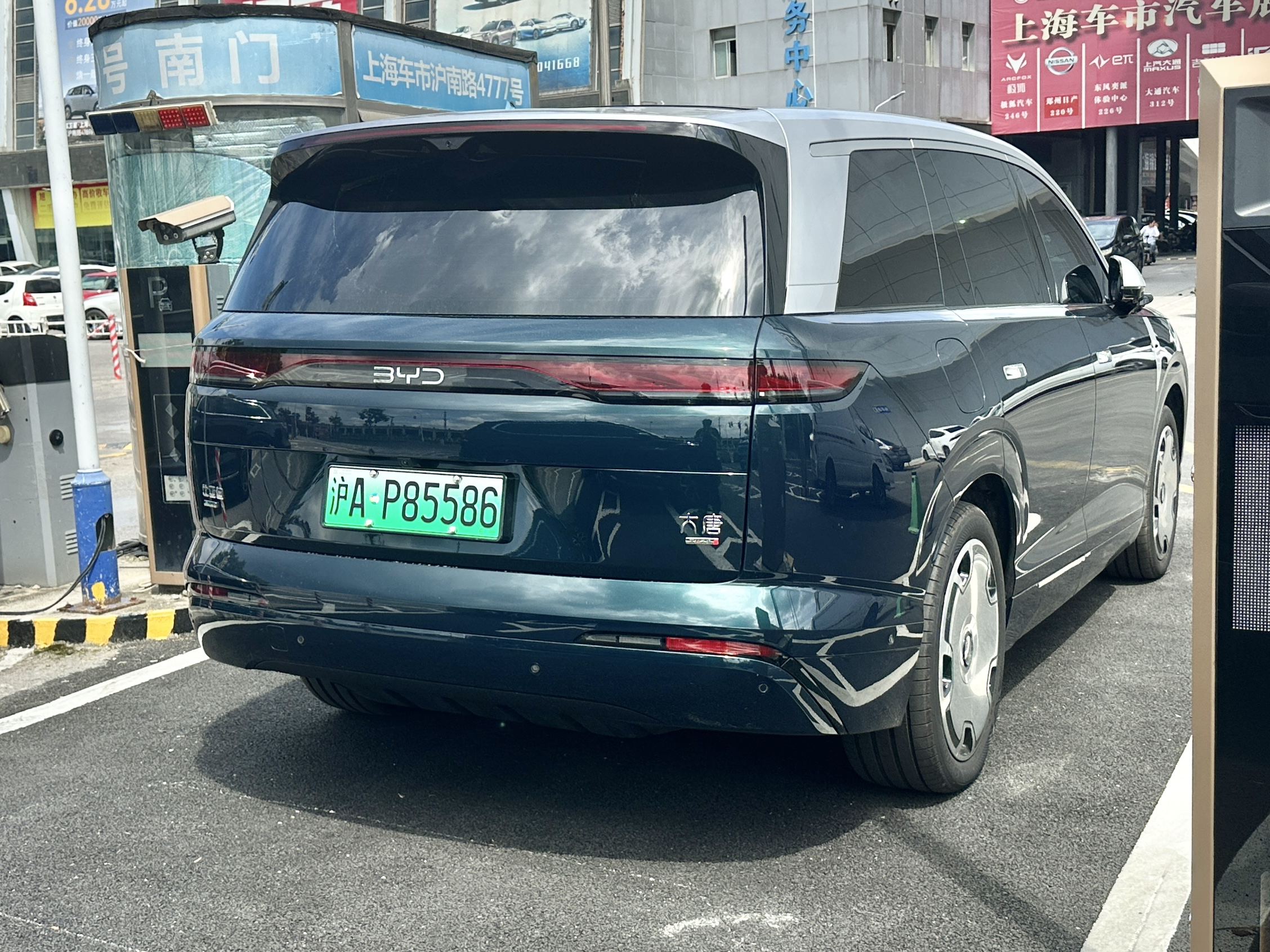
Rear view

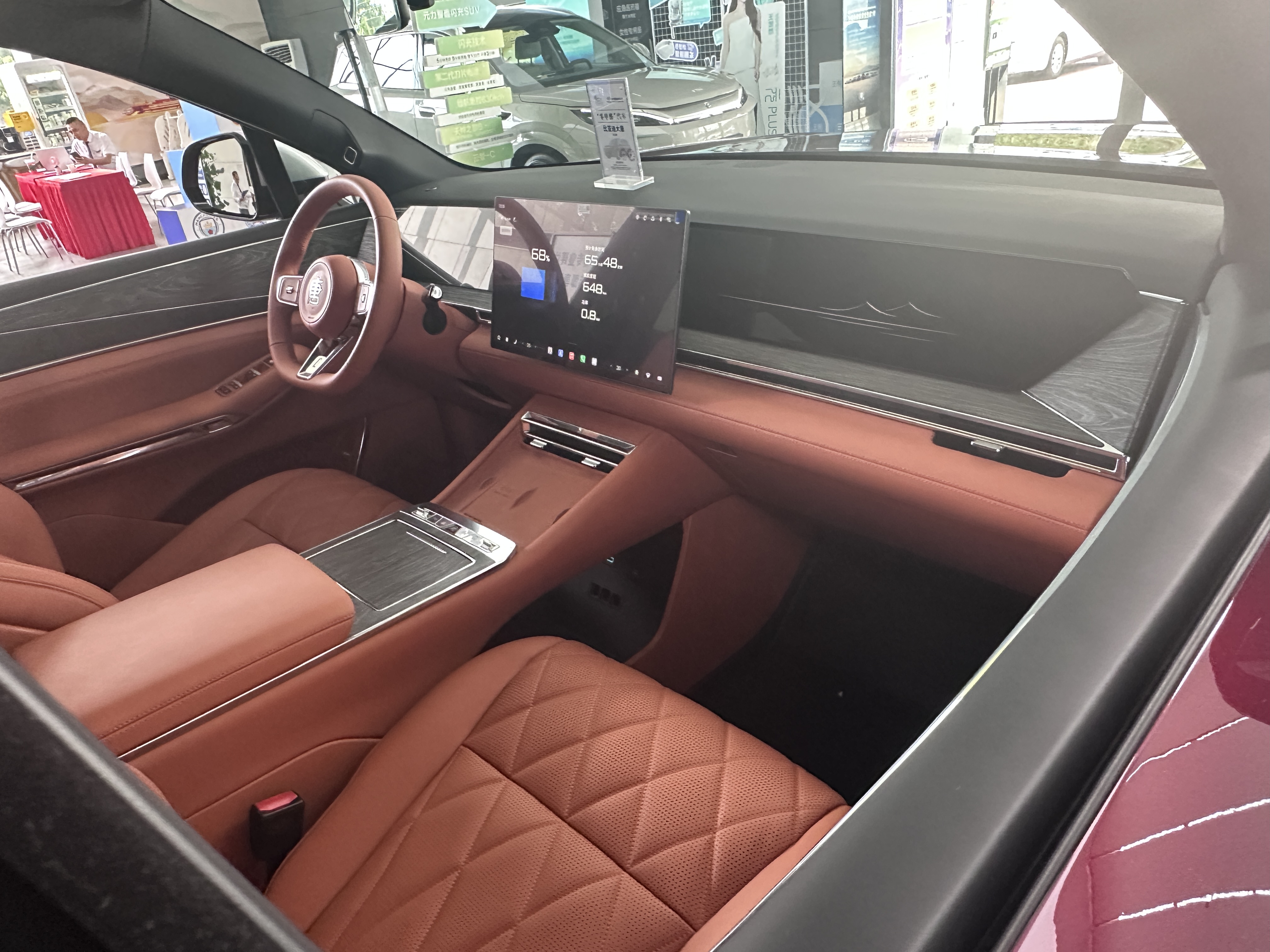
Interior

== Powertrain and chassis ==
It was previously speculated that the plug-in hybrid version of the Datang will produce at least 670 horsepower judging by the "4.9S" badge on the tailgate of a completely undisguised Datang.

BYD's second-generation Blade battery (LFP) and flash charging technologies are used, allowing a 10%-70% charge time of 5 minutes and a 10%-97% charge time of 9 minutes.

The Datang uses BYD's DiSus-A suspension system utilizing dual-chamber air suspension. In addition it also features four-wheel steering.

Specifications
Model	Drive	Motor	Power	Battery		Range	Kerb weight
Model	Drive	Motor	Power	Type	Weight	CLTC	Kerb weight
800 km Premium	RWD	Single	300 kW (400 hp)	105.792 kWh	755.5 kg (1,666 lb)	800 km (497 mi)	2,640 kg (5,820 lb)
950 km Flagship	AWD	Single	370 kW (500 hp)	130.15 kWh	885 kg (1,951 lb)	950 km (590 mi)	2,805 kg (6,184 lb)
850 km 4WD Flagship	AWD	Dual	585 kW (784 hp)	130.15 kWh	885 kg (1,951 lb)	850 km (528 mi)	2,970 kg (6,548 lb)
Shengshi Edition	AWD	Dual	585 kW (784 hp)	130.15 kWh	885 kg (1,951 lb)	850 km (528 mi)	2,970 kg (6,548 lb)

== Sales ==
On April 25, 2026, BYD announced that the Datang received over 30,000 pre-orders within 24 hours of opening. On May 7, 2026, BYD announced that the Datang received over 100,000 pre-orders since it opened at the 2026 Beijing Auto Show.

== See also ==
- List of BYD Auto vehicles
