= BYD Tang L =

Electric mid-size crossover SUV

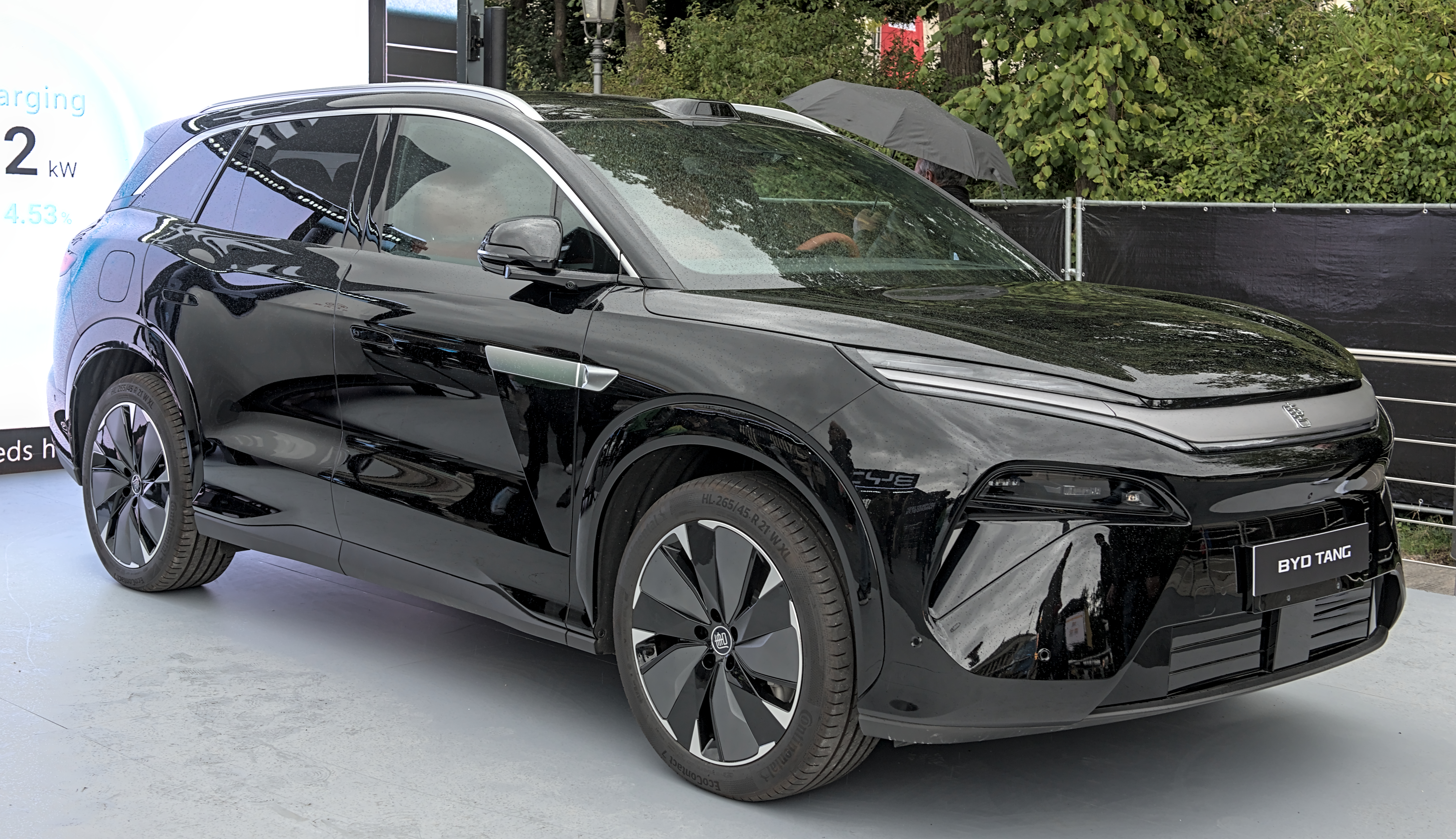

Overview
- Manufacturer: BYD Auto
- Model code: SRH (DM-i/DM-p); SRE (EV)
- Also called: BYD Atto 8; BYD Sealion 8 (Asia-Pacific)
- Production: 2025–present
- Model years: 2025 (China)
- Assembly: China: Shenzhen, Guangdong; Changzhou, Jiangsu
- Designer: Under the lead of Wolfgang Egger

Body and chassis
- Class: Mid-size SUV (E-segment)
- Body style: 5-door crossover SUV
- Layout: Front-engine, front-motor, front-wheel drive (DM-i); Front-engine, dual-motor, all-wheel drive (DM-p); Rear-motor, rear-wheel-drive (EV); Dual-motor, four-wheel-drive (EV AWD)
- Platform: DM-i 5.0 platform (DM-i); Super e platform (EV)
- Related: BYD Datang; BYD Han L; Fangchengbao Ti7

Powertrain
- Engine: Petrol plug-in hybrid: 1.5 L BYD472ZQB I4 turbo
- Electric motor: Permanent magnet synchronous
- Transmission: E-CVT (DM-i/DM-p)
- Hybrid drivetrain: Plug-in hybrid
- Battery: 35.6 kWh BYD Blade LFP (PHEV); 100.5 kWh BYD Blade LFP (EV)
- Electric range: 135–165 km (84–103 mi) (DM, WLTP); 175–215 km (109–134 mi) (DM, CLTC); 600–670 km (373–416 mi) (EV, CLTC)
- Plug-in charging: DM-i/DM-p: 71 kW; EV: 1000 kW

Dimensions
- Wheelbase: 2,950 mm (116.1 in)
- Length: 5,040 mm (198.4 in)
- Width: 1,996 mm (78.6 in)
- Height: 1,760 mm (69.3 in)
- Curb weight: 2,240–2,967 kg (4,938–6,541 lb)

The BYD Tang L (Chinese: 比亚迪唐L) is a mid-size SUV manufactured by BYD Auto since 2025. Available with battery electric (EV) and plug-in hybrid (DM-i) powertrains, it is part of the BYD Tang series.

== Overview ==
The Tang L was officially unveiled in China on 16 January 2025, and was later launched on 9 April 2025. It is positioned higher than the existing BYD Tang and as BYD's largest SUV. Previous Tang models continue to be offered at a lower price.

=== Design ===
The exterior of the Tang L adopts the series' Loong Face (formerly Dragon Face) design language inspired by Chinese heritage. Dragon whisker-like air intakes and split headlights are connected to the chrome-plated trim on the front fascia, while the taillights on the rear fascia are inspired by traditional bamboo weaving techniques.

The interior has a similar design to the Han L and has a dual-colour theme. A 15.6-inch rotatable touchscreen infotainment system accompanies an augmented reality heads-up display, four-spoke flat-bottom design steering wheel, full digital driver's instrument panel, the shift-by-wire gear lever mounted on the steering wheel column and physical buttons in the armrest area. Other interior features are ambient lighting, bamboo wood accents, dual wireless charging pads, Dynaudio sound system, an integrated fragrance dispenser, an onboard refrigerator and a panoramic sunroof.

The Tang L has a 675 L (23.8 cu ft) boot that expands to 1,960 L (69 cu ft) when the second and third row seats are folded down. The battery electric model has a frunk storage area. The vehicle has a 2+3+2 seven-seat layout.

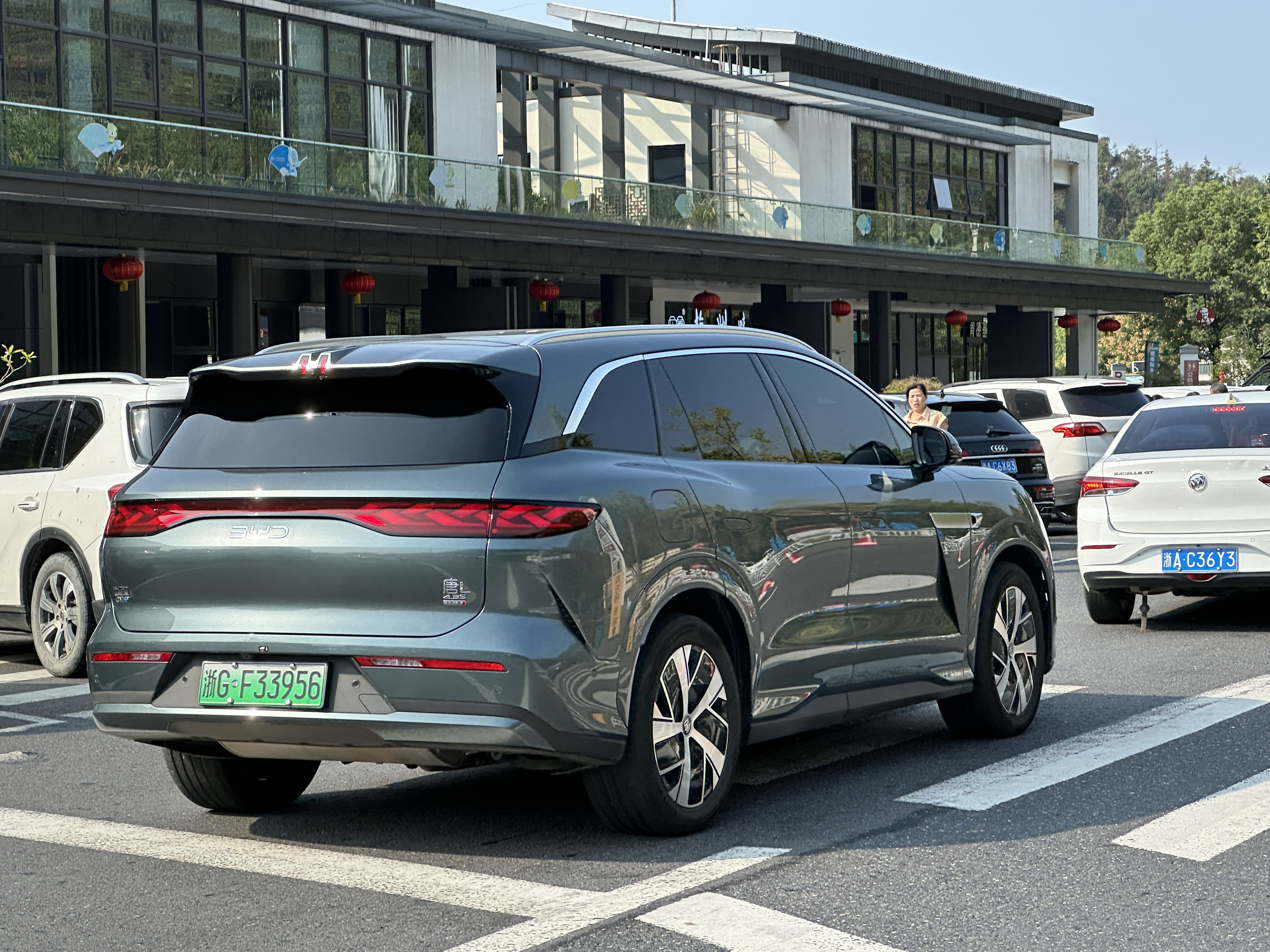
Rear view

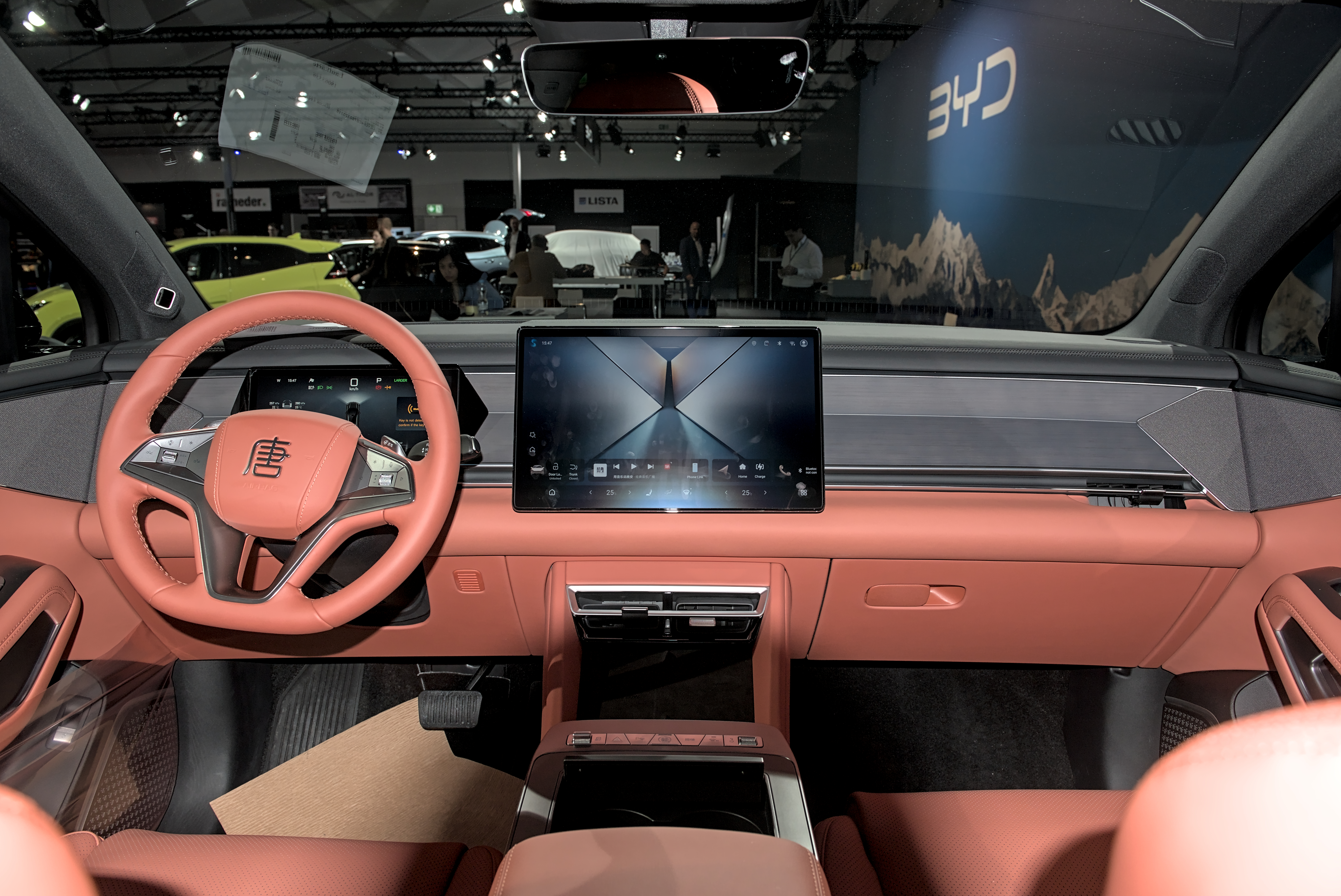
Interior

=== Safety ===
The Tang L features God’s Eye C (DiPilot 300) intelligent driving assistance system incorporates the DiLink 150 intelligent cockpit system and a roof-mounted Lidar on higher trim levels.

C-NCAP (2024) test results BYD Tang L 670km Flagship LiDAR (7-seater)
Category		%
Overall:	5.5 /5 stars	93.1%
Occupant protection:		96.69%
Vulnerable road users:		84.35%
Active safety:		94.25%

ANCAP test results BYD Sealion 8 (2026, aligned with Euro NCAP)
Test	Score
Overall:	5 /5 stars
Safe driving	73%
Crash avoidance	76%
Crash protection	90%
Post crash	100%

=== Powertrain ===
The Tang L offers two powertrain options shared with the Han L — battery electric and plug-in hybrid. Battery electric variants sit on BYD's super e platform – a 945 V architecture with a 115 kWh redesigned blade battery to allow faster ion transfer in the electrolyte and less resistance through the diaphragm, resulting in a peak maximum 10C charging rate. The EV version is able to charge from 10–70% within 6 minutes.

Model	Battery		Power				EV Range		Peak DCFC	0–100 km/h (62 mph)	Top Speed
Model	Type	Weight	Engine	Front	Rear	Total	CLTC	WLTP	Peak DCFC	0–100 km/h (62 mph)	Top Speed
EV RWD	100.5 kWh LFP	640 kg (1,411 lb)	—	—	500 kW (671 hp; 680 PS)		670 km (416 mi)	—	1000 kW	6.9 s	265 km/h (165 mph)
EV AWD	100.5 kWh LFP	640 kg (1,411 lb)	—	230 kW (308 hp; 313 PS)	580 kW (778 hp; 789 PS)	810 kW (1,086 hp; 1,101 PS)	600 km (373 mi)	—	1000 kW	3.9 s	245 km/h (152 mph)
DM-i	35.62 kWh LFP	266 kg (586 lb)	1.5 L turbo 115 kW (154 hp; 156 PS)	200 kW (268 hp; 272 PS)	—	200 kW (268 hp; 272 PS)	215 km (134 mi)	165 km (103 mi)	71 kW	7.9 s	200 km/h (124 mph)
DM-p	35.62 kWh LFP	266 kg (586 lb)	1.5 L turbo 115 kW (154 hp; 156 PS)	200 kW (268 hp; 272 PS)		400 kW (536 hp; 544 PS)	200 km (124 mi)	150 km (93 mi)	71 kW	4.3 s	200 km/h (124 mph)
DM-p Drone	35.62 kWh LFP	266 kg (586 lb)	1.5 L turbo 115 kW (154 hp; 156 PS)	200 kW (268 hp; 272 PS)		400 kW (536 hp; 544 PS)	175 km (109 mi)	135 km (84 mi)	71 kW	4.5 s	200 km/h (124 mph)

== Markets ==
=== Africa ===
==== South Africa ====
The Atto 8 was launched in South Africa on 16 April 2026, with two variants: Premium (19 kWh) and Performance AWD (35.6 kWh), both variants are powered by the 1.5-litre turbocharged petrol plug-in hybrid paired with a lithium iron phosphate battery.

=== Americas ===
==== Mexico ====
The Atto 8 was launched in Mexico on 29 October 2025, in a sole unnamed variant powered by the 1.5-litre turbocharged petrol plug-in hybrid paired with a 35.6 kWh lithium iron phosphate battery.

=== Oceania ===
==== Australia ====
The Sealion 8 was launched in Australia on 16 January 2026, with three variants: Dynamic FWD, Dynamic AWD and Premium AWD. All variants are powered by the 1.5-litre turbocharged petrol plug-in hybrid paired with a lithium iron phosphate battery, available in 19 kWh (FWD) or 35.6 kWh (AWD) capacities.

==== New Zealand ====
The Sealion 8 went on sale in New Zealand on 23 January 2026, with three variants: 2WD Dynamic, AWD Dynamic and AWD Premium. All variants are powered by the 1.5-litre turbocharged petrol plug-in hybrid paired with a lithium iron phosphate battery, available in 19 kWh (FWD) or 35.6 kWh (AWD) capacities.

=== Southeast Asia ===
==== Brunei ====
The Sealion 8 was launched in Brunei on 14 April 2026.

==== Singapore ====
The Sealion 8 was launched in Singapore on 9 July 2026, in the sole Dynamic variant, powered by the 1.5-litre turbocharged petrol plug-in hybrid paired with a 19 kWh lithium iron phosphate battery.

== See also ==
- List of BYD Auto vehicles

== Sales ==
Year	China		
Year	Tang L DM	Tang L EV	Total
2025	22,554	16,206	38,760
