= Devialet =

French company specializing in audio equipment

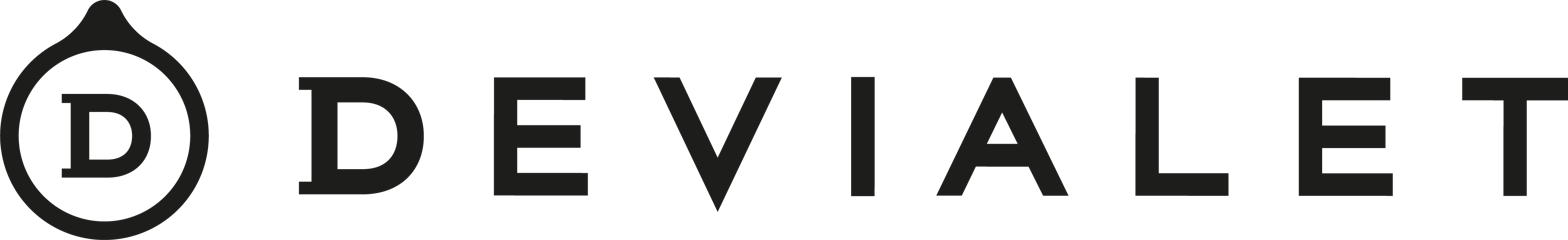
- Type: Privately held company
- Industry: Audio
- Founded: 2007; 19 years ago in Paris
- Founders: Quentin Sannié; Mathias Moronvalle; Pierre-Emmanuel Calmel; Emmanuel Nardin
- Headquarters: Paris, France
- Key people: Jacques Demont (CEO)
- Products: Speakers; amplifiers; headphones
- Website: www.devialet.com

Devialet (French: [dəvjalɛ]) is a French audio technology company that produces a line of speakers (Phantom) and amplifiers (Expert). It was founded in 2007 in Paris.

== History ==
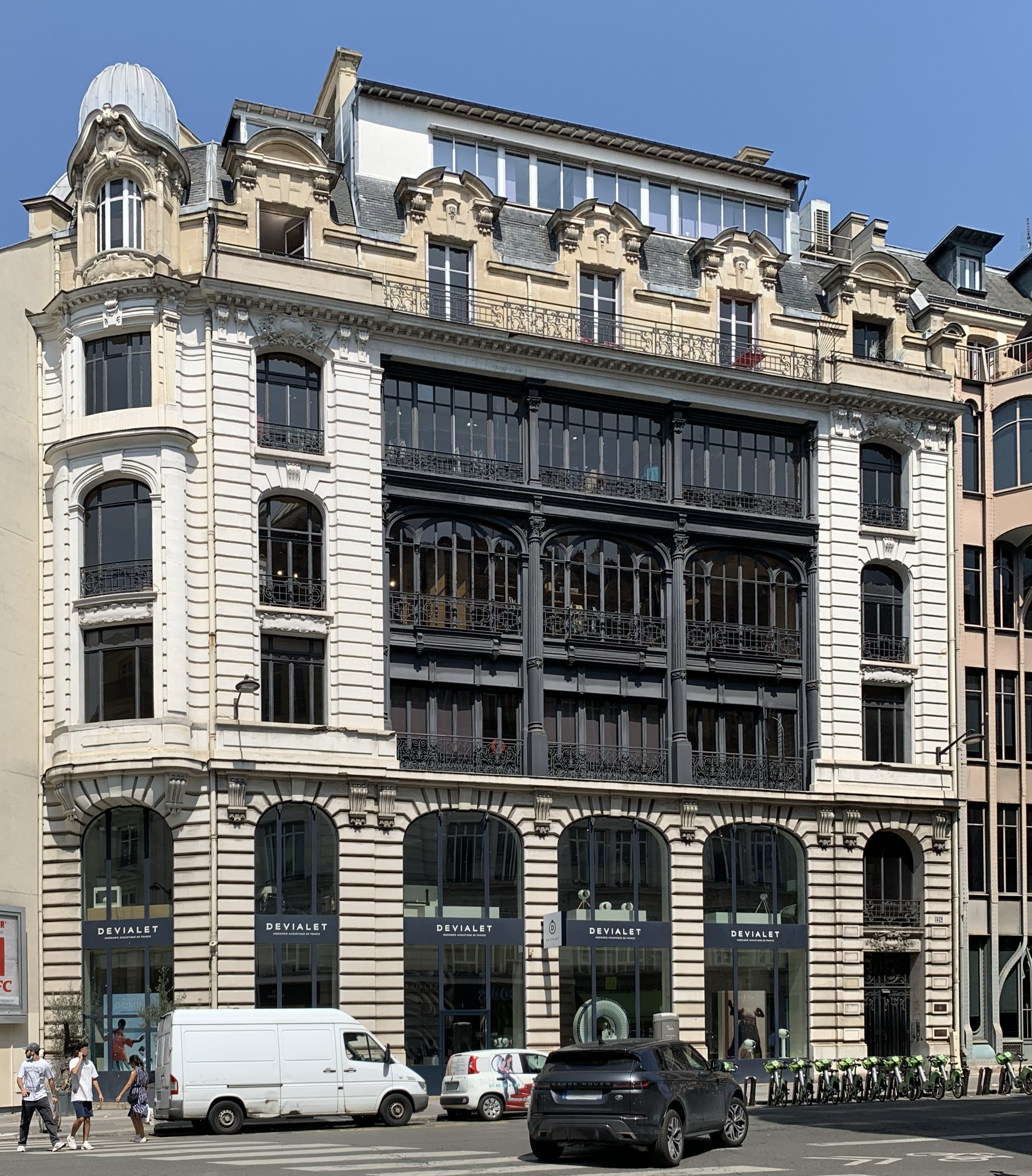
Devialet shop in Paris

In 2004, engineer Pierre-Emmanuel Calmel, invented the Analog Digital Hybrid (ADH) audio technology that is the basis of Devialet's products. Three years later, in 2007, he developed an amplifier prototype using the ADH technology, and founded Devialet along with Quentin Sannié and Emmanuel Nardin. At the company's founding, Sannié served as CEO and Calmel as CTO.

Devialet introduced its first product to market, an amplifier called "D-Premier," in 2010. Between 2010 and 2012, Devialet raised over €17 million in funds from a variety of investors.

In June 2013, the company unveiled an updated version of its D-Premier amp changes (known as the Devialet 240) and two new lower-end versions, the Devialet 110 and Devialet 170. In late 2014, the company announced the release of its first speaker, the Devialet Phantom. The speaker was made available in Europe in early 2015. In June 2015, it raised €17.5 million ($20 million) in another round of funding led by previous investors. The purpose of this funding round was to bring the Phantom to the United States market.

Devialet released two new products in 2016: the "Gold Phantom" speaker capable of producing sound volumes of up to 108 decibels and the Expert PRO amplifier.

In November 2016, Devialet raised €100 million ($106 million) in a funding round led by Ginko Ventures, Foxconn, Jay-Z's Roc Nation, Andy Rubin's Playground Global, Groupe Renault, the Sharp Corporation, and Korelya Capital among others.

In October 2017, it entered into a 10-year agreement with the Paris Opera to build a "sound discovery room" in the Palais Garnier. The company also entered into a partnership with Renault to build car audio systems and demonstrated a prototype version for Renault's SYMBIOZ concept car in December 2017.

Quentin Sannié, who had been the CEO of Devialet from its foundation, stepped down from the role in March 2018 and was replaced by Frank Lebouchard.

In October 2020, Devialet launched its Gemini in-ear headphones, which compete with Apple's AirPods.

In March 2022, the company introduced the Devialet Dione soundbar. In November of the same year, it released its first portable connected speaker, the Devialet Mania.

== Products ==
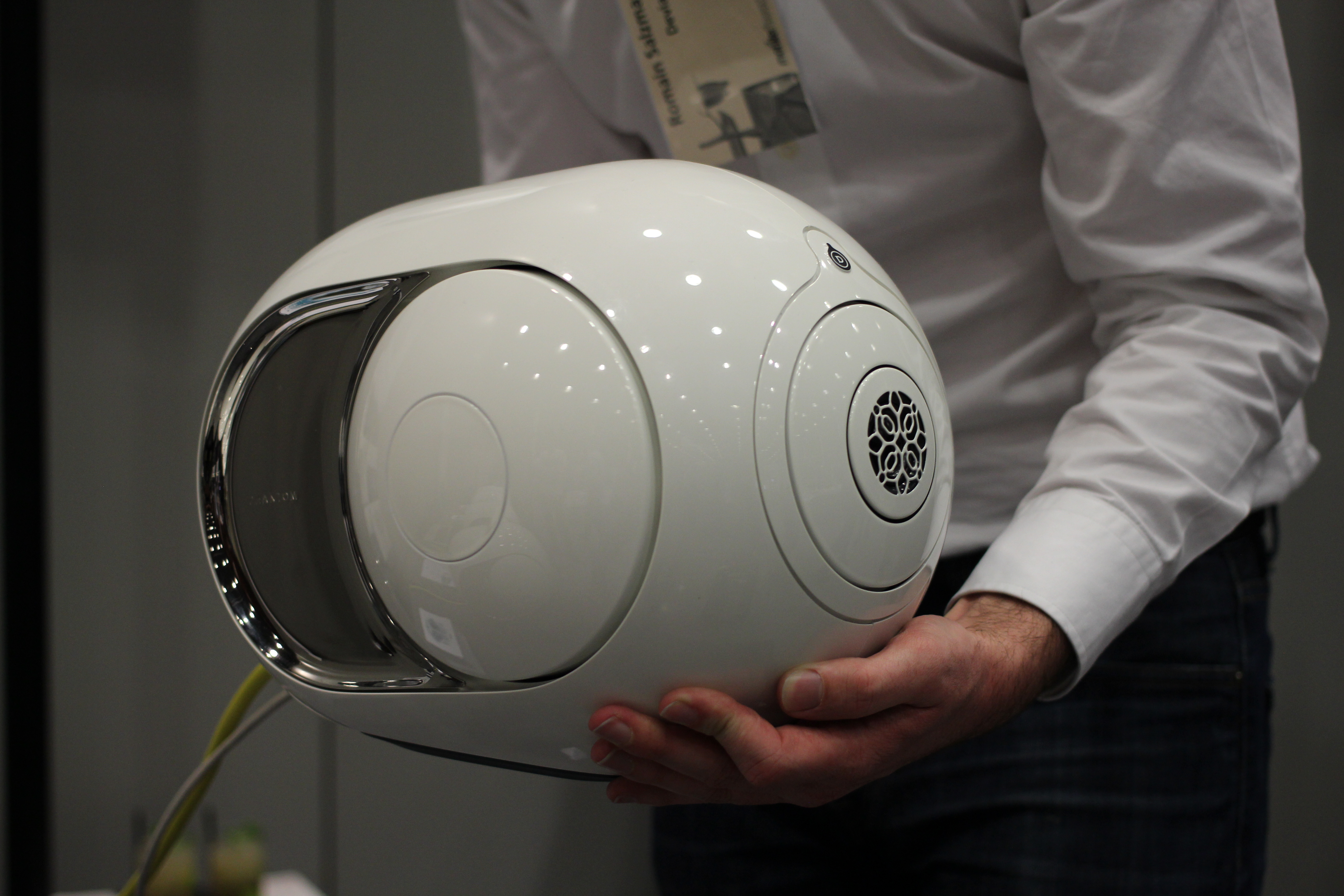
Devialet Phantom speaker from 2015.

=== Phantom ===
Devialet produces a range of wireless speakers called "Phantom" along with a range of amplifiers known as "Expert Pro." The Phantom line is separated into two ranges, Phantom Premier and Phantom Reactor.

In June 2013, the company unveiled an updated version of its D-Premier amp changes (known as the Devialet 240) and two new lower-end versions, the Devialet 110 and Devialet 170. In late 2014, the company announced the release of its first speaker, the Devialet Phantom. The speaker was made available in Europe in early 2015. In June 2015, it raised €17.5 million ($20 million) in another round of funding led by previous investors. The purpose of this funding round was to bring the Phantom to the United States market.

In June 2016, the company released an upgraded "Gold Phantom" speaker with 4,500 watts of power that was capable of producing sound volumes of up to 108 decibels. Later that year, it announced an "Immersive Theater System" that would make use of several Gold Phantoms. Devialet continued updating their line of amplifiers (now known as "Expert"), and in late 2016 it introduced the Expert PRO amplifier as a high-end option. The company also opened an outlet store in New York City.

In November 2017, the company released an upgraded version of the original Phantom.

In October 2018, Devialet announced the Phantom Reactor speaker. As of 2018, the company maintains 160 patents for its technologies. In February 2019, Devialet and Free jointly released a TV set-top box with Devialet speakers. In November 2019, Devialet partnered with Huawei and unveiled a new specifically designed speaker, the Sound X. In January 2020, Devialet introduced the Soundform Elite speaker/phone charger designed with Belkin.

=== Dione ===
The company's home cinema soundbar sound system.

=== Sound Joy ===
Co-developed with Huawei and marketed by the Chinese company, this smart speaker was launched in 2022.

=== Sky Soundbox ===
Co-developed with Sky UK and released as an add-on for Sky Q TV packages.

=== Devialet Mania ===
In 2022, Devialet announced its first portable speaker.

=== Gemini II ===
The company also produces Gemini earbud wireless headphones. In September 2023, the company launched the second version of its pair of Gemini wireless earbuds.

== Audio technologies ==
Devialet devices use several audio technologies developed by the company, marketed under these names:

- Analog Digital Hybrid (ADH) combines elements of analog amps (Class-A) and digital amps (Class-D), allowing for larger wattage and decibel peaks.
- Heart Bass Implosion (HBI) is a technology that provides broader coverage of low-frequency sounds and mimics the properties of a subwoofer.
- Speaker Active Matching (SAM) is a signal processing mechanism that analyzes and adjusts sounds in real-time to "reproduce the exact acoustic pressure recorded by the microphone."
- Active Co-Spherical Engine (ACE) refers to the spherical shape of some Devialet devices (namely, the Phantom speakers) is an acoustic architecture designed to deliver sound in every direction.

== Partnerships ==
Devialet appointed Isack Hadjar, a French Formula 1 driver and Red Bull junior, as its first-ever global brand ambassador in April 2026, to promote its high-end audio innovation worldwide.
