= BYD Blade battery =

Battery type for electric vehicles

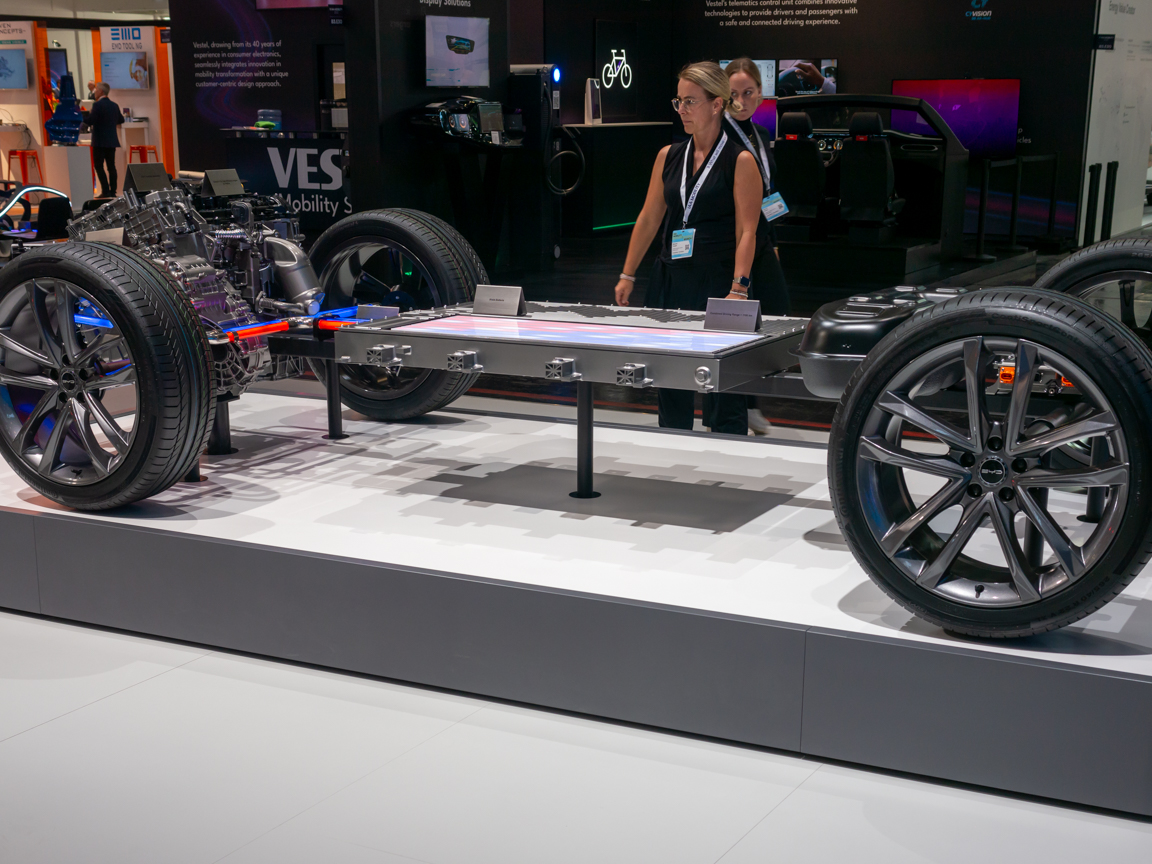
BYD Blade battery packs showcased at the IAA Summit 2023, Germany

The BYD Blade Battery is a type of lithium iron phosphate (LFP) battery first developed and manufactured by FinDreams Battery, a subsidiary of BYD. It was publicly announced in 2020. The blade design was conceived to improve space utilisation, structural integrity, and safety relative to conventional cylindrical, pouch, and block prismatic cells.

== History ==
=== Development and launch ===
BYD first disclosed the imminent mass production of the Blade Battery on 11 January 2020, when Wang Chuanfu announced at the China Electric Vehicle 100 Forum (中国电动汽车百人会论坛) that the battery was close to production readiness. At the same day's Third Sino-German Automotive Industry Summit, BYD's head of international cooperation disclosed the battery held over 300 core patents. The formal public launch event was held on the afternoon of 29 March 2020, broadcast live by Shenzhen Television. Wang Chuanfu, BYD Vice President and FinDreams Battery Chairman He Long, and Chinese Academy of Sciences member and Tsinghua University professor Ouyang Minggao jointly presented the technology.

Production of the Blade Battery commenced at the Chongqing FinDreams Battery Co., Ltd. plant, which had broken ground in February 2019 and was completed within approximately one year. The facility had an initial planned annual capacity of 20 GWh, with a total investment of CN¥10 billion and eight lithium-ion battery production lines.

The Blade Battery was first integrated into the BYD Han EV, which went on sale in June 2020, making it the first production vehicle to use the Blade Battery. Wang Chuanfu stated at the launch that BYD aimed to "erase the word 'spontaneous combustion' from the dictionary of new energy vehicles."

BYD has stated that the Blade Battery concept originated from its own engineers and that BYD holds complete intellectual property and patent rights over the technology. Following a 2024 Bloomberg report alleging a circa-2017 collaboration with Apple Inc. on long-range EV battery development, BYD issued a statement affirming that Apple does not own any of the technology used in the Blade Battery.

=== Expansion across BYD's vehicle range ===
On 7 April 2021, BYD held a launch event in Chongqing titled "Pure Electric Full Lineup — Armed with the Blade" (纯电全系 佩刀安天下), at which it announced that all of its pure electric vehicle models would henceforth be equipped with the Blade Battery as standard, and that nail penetration testing would be adopted as a mandatory company-wide quality standard. Four new models fitted with the Blade Battery were simultaneously launched: the 2021 BYD Tang EV, Qin Plus EV, Song Plus EV, and 2021 e2. On the same occasion, BYD demonstrated the Blade Battery's passage of a heavy-load structural test in which a 46-tonne fully-loaded truck was driven over a Blade battery pack, with the pack reported to have sustained no deformation, leakage, or smoke.

A Short Blade variant was also developed for BYD's plug-in hybrid DM-i (Dual Mode intelligence) platform, first announced with the Qin Plus DM-i in January 2021. This power-type Blade battery uses a different thermal management configuration, including self-heating and direct-cooling technology, compared with the energy-type cells used in BEV applications, and is smaller in capacity, typically ranging from 8.3 to 21.5 kWh.

=== Third-party adoption ===
Following its launch, BYD opened Blade Battery supply to external automotive manufacturers. Confirmed third-party adoptions include the Toyota bZ3, a battery electric sedan jointly developed by Toyota, BYD Auto, and FAW Toyota through the BYD Toyota EV Technology (BTET) joint venture, which debuted in China in October 2022 and was officially launched in April 2023 equipped with a Blade Battery and BYD-supplied electric motor. Additionally, the Hongqi E-QM5 and Bestune NAT, manufactured by FAW Group, were listed in China's new energy vehicle recommended catalogue with Blade batteries supplied by Chongqing FinDreams Battery.

In February 2024, BYD reached a strategic agreement with US-based automotive supplier BorgWarner, under which FinDreams Battery serves as BorgWarner's sole supplier of Blade battery cells and licenses related intellectual property.

== Specifications ==
Illustration of blades in a blade LFP battery pack

The Blade Battery is most commonly a 96 centimetres (37.8 in) long and 9 centimetres (3.5 in) wide single-cell battery with a special design, which can be placed in an array and inserted into a battery pack like a blade. It is made in various lengths and thicknesses. The space utilization of the battery pack is increased by over 50% compared to most conventional lithium iron phosphate block batteries.

== Performance and lifecycle ==
=== Energy density and range ===
Despite LFP chemistry's lower intrinsic energy density compared with Li-NMC chemistries, the CTP architecture's space efficiency enables competitive driving range, with the BYD Han EV achieving up to 605 km CLTC range from a 77 kWh Blade Battery pack.

=== Low-temperature performance ===
The extended flat surface area of Blade cells maximises contact with thermal management plates, enabling more efficient active heating and cooling. BYD states the battery retains more than 90% of its capacity at −20 °C (−4 °F) discharge rates compared with room temperature performance, aided by an AI-based thermal management control system. The DM-i plug-in hybrid variant uses a dedicated self-heating low-temperature preheating technology in place of conventional liquid thermal management circuits, reducing system complexity and vehicle mass.

== Safety ==
BYD claims that, in the nail penetration test, the Blade Battery emitted no smoke or fire after being penetrated, and its surface temperature reached only 30 to 60 °C (86 to 140 °F). The Blade Battery also passed other extreme test conditions, such as being crushed and bent, being heated in a furnace to 300 °C (572 °F), and being overcharged by 260%. None of these resulted in a fire or explosion.

BYD claims that "EVs equipped with the Blade Battery would be far less susceptible to catching fire – even when they are severely damaged."

In July 2021, a BYD Han EV with Blade batteries was crash-tested in China (car-to-car crash test) versus an Arcfox Alpha-S. About 48 hours after the test, the BYD Han was producing smoke and allegedly caught on fire. BYD argued that the fire was due to the misuse of battery coolant. Specifically, the "red" coolant used was identified as electrically conductive, which caused further reaction when the Blade Battery and wirings were damaged. The standard battery coolant used in the Han is "purple", which is not conductive. BYD also stated the testing was "not mainstream, non-authoritative, and not within the industry standard", and wishes for the media to communicate with the company to understand the specification to the car before testing for a more objective and reasonable result.

== Second generation (Blade Battery 2.0) ==
On 5 March 2026, BYD unveiled the second-generation Blade Battery alongside its Flash Charging infrastructure at a launch event in Shenzhen. Wang Chuanfu announced a new world record for production vehicle charging speed: 10% to 70% state of charge (SoC) in five minutes, and 10% to 97% SoC in nine minutes, using BYD's 1,500 kW Flash chargers.

The second generation is offered in two cell formats. The Short Blade format (approximately 450–580 mm) supports an 8C peak charge rate and a 16C peak discharge rate. The Long Blade format achieves a cell-level energy density of approximately 190–210 Wh/kg, a greater than 5% improvement over the first generation, enabling CLTC ranges exceeding 1,000 km (620 mi) in select models, such as the Denza Z9 GT (1,036 km (644 mi)) and Yangwang U7 (1,006 km (625 mi)). The Blade Battery 2.0 is also paired with updated Cell-to-Body 2.0 (CTB 2.0) integration, reported to increase volumetric space utilisation to 76%.

Cold-weather performance is significantly improved: a 20% to 97% charge is achievable in approximately 12 minutes at −30 °C (−22 °F), only three minutes slower than at room temperature. BYD announced a lifetime warranty on second-generation blade cells, and stated the battery retains its safety characteristics, having passed a nail penetration test after more than 500 fast-charge cycles, including during an active charging state.

BYD announced the Blade Battery 2.0 would be launched initially across ten models, including the Yangwang U7 and Denza Z9 GT. BYD simultaneously announced plans to build 20,000 Flash Charging Stations across China by the end of 2026, with 4,239 already operational at the time of the announcement, and a target to begin global rollout by end-2026.

The precise cathode chemistry of the Blade Battery 2.0 had not been officially confirmed by BYD as of early 2026. BYD's patent activity, reported improvements in energy density, and references to a 3.8 V operating voltage have led analysts to suggest the use of lithium manganese iron phosphate (LMFP) as the cathode material, which would raise the voltage platform from the 3.2 V characteristic of standard LFP. However, regulatory filings for the first Blade 2.0 vehicle, the 2026 Yangwang U7, describe the battery as LFP, and BYD had not publicly confirmed an LMFP transition at launch. (Note: Industry analysts at Benchmark Mineral Intelligence calculated that confirmed LMFP adoption in Blade 2.0 could increase 2026 battery-grade manganese demand by approximately 7%.)
