= Dual-motor, four-wheel-drive layout =

Car layout in automotive design

Typical dual motor layout

In automotive design, dual-motor, four-wheel-drive layout is mainly used by battery electric vehicles by having two electric motors that each drives the front and rear axle, creating a four-wheel drive layout. This is made possible by the smaller size of electric motors compared to internal combustion engines (ICEs), which in addition are also accompanied by a bulky engine cooling system, allowing it to be fit more versatilely into multiple locations.

The use of separate motors for the front and rear drive wheels eliminates the need of a drive shaft that is ubiquitous in four-wheel drive ICE vehicles. This frees up space for bigger battery modules, which are commonly mounted on the chassis floor between the axles.

The dual-motor layout is beneficial in re-distributing torque and power to maximize effective propulsion in response to road grip conditions and weight transfer in the vehicle. For example, during hard acceleration, the front motor must reduce torque and power in order to prevent the front wheels from overspinning as weight transfers to the rear of the vehicle. The excess power is transferred to the rear motor where it can be used immediately. The opposite applies when braking, when the front motor can accept more regenerative braking torque and power.

However dual-motor vehicles usually have less range for the same battery size than single-motor designs. In addition, electric vehicles may be equipped with more than two electric motors to achieve greater power output and superior handling.

The first mass-produced triple-motor layout was introduced on the Audi e-tron in 2020, which consists of one motor at the front and two motors at the rear.

A rare example of a non-electric vehicle utilizing this layout is the Citroën 2CV Sahara, which has two flat-twin petrol engines.

== See also ==
- Individual wheel drive
