= Harmony Hall Fukui =

Harmony Hall Fukui ハーモニーホールふくい
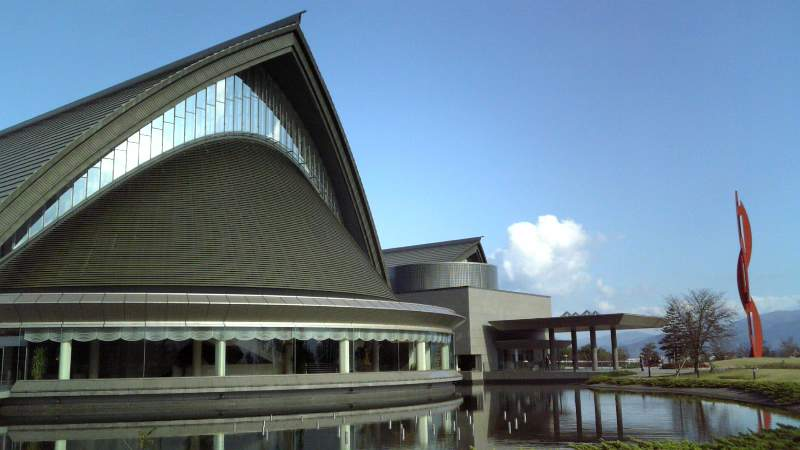
- A front view of the Harmony Hall Fukui
- Interactive map of the Harmony Hall Fukui ハーモニーホールふくい area

General information
- Type: Concert hall
- Location: 40-1-1 Imaichi-cho, Fukui, Fukui, Japan
- Coordinates: 36°0′53″N 136°12′28″E
- Opened: 23 September 1997
- Renovated: 2004
- Cost: ¥ 9,266 million
- Owner: Fukui Prefecture Organization for Cultural Promotion

Technical details
- Floor area: 11,649 m^{2}

Design and construction
- Architecture firm: Nikken Sekkei
- Other designers: Nagata Acoustics
- Main contractor: JV composed of followings Tobishima Corporation; Maeda Corporation; Muranaka Corporation

Other information
- Seating type: Reserved
- Seating capacity: 1,456 (Main Hall); 610 (Small Hall)

Website
- Official website

References
- Factsheet

The Harmony Hall Fukui (ハーモニーホールふくい, Hāmonī Hōru Fukui), formally called Fukui-kenritsu Ongakudō (福井県立音楽堂), often abbreviated as HHF, is a concert hall located in Fukui, Fukui, Japan.

== Summary ==
Established in 1997, the building is owned by the Fukui Prefecture Organization for Cultural Promotion (福井県文化振興事業団, Fukui-ken bunka shinkō jigyōdan), known for having a huge organ built by Karl Schuke Berliner Orgelbauwerkstatt in the main music hall.

The acoustics for the hall were designed by Nagata Acoustics, while Nikken Sekkei carried out its general design.

== Facilities ==
The building of the Harmony Hall Fukui houses a large main hall, small chamber music hall, and rehearsal rooms.

=== Main hall ===
The shoebox-style main hall has seating capacity of 1,456. A large concert pipe organ made by Karl Schuke GmbH. has set up in the centre rear of the Hall since the improvements carried out in 2004. This instrument has 70 stops and 5,014 pipes.

=== Small hall ===
The small chamber music hall has seating capacity of 610.

== Access ==
- Three minutes walk from Harmony Hall Station (Fukui Railway Fukubu Line)
- Fukui Railway Bus Harmony Hall-mae Bus Stop

== See also ==
- List of concert halls
