= Shokokaigisho-mae Station =

Railway station in Fukui, Japan

Shokokaigisho-mae Station 商工会議所前駅
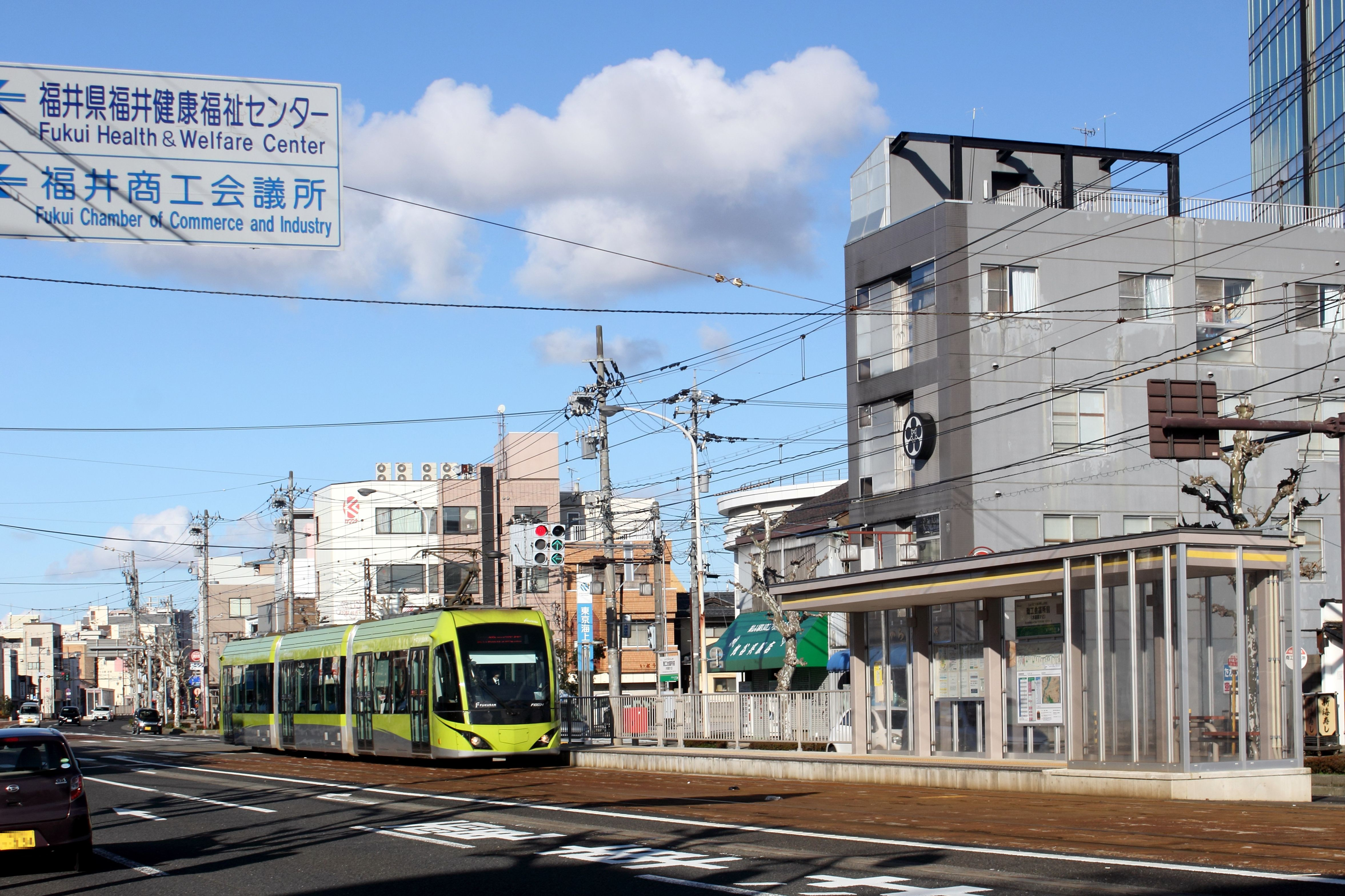
- Shokokaigisho-mae Station in December 2016

General information
- Location: 1-14-21 Minori, Fukui-shi, Fukui-ken 918-8004; Japan
- Coordinates: 36°03′12″N 136°12′54″E
- Operator: Fukui Railway
- Line: ■ Fukubu Line
- Distance: 18.4 km from Takefu-shin
- Platforms: 2 side platforms
- Tracks: 2
- Connections: Bus stop

Other information
- Status: Unstaffed
- Station code: F19
- Website: Official website

History
- Opened: October 15, 1933
- Former names: Kidayotsutsuji (until 2016)
Location
- Location within Japan

Shokokaigisho-mae Station (商工会議所前駅, Shōkōkaigisho-mae-eki) is a Fukui Railway Fukubu Line station located in the city of Fukui, Fukui, Japan.

== Lines ==
Shōkōkaigisho Station is served by the Fukui Railway Fukubu Line, and is located 18.4 kilometers from the terminus of the line at Takefu-shin.

== Station layout ==
The station consists of two ground-level opposed side platforms connected by a level crossing. There is no station building, but rather two raised platforms in the median of Phoenix-dōri (Prefectural Route 30) from which customers board and disembark.

== Adjacent stations ==
«	Service	»
Fukui Railway Fukubu Line
Sekijūjimae	Express	Asuwayama-Koenguchi
Sekijūjimae	Local	Asuwayama-Koenguchi

== History ==
The station was opened on October 15, 1933, as Kidayotsusuji Station (木田四ツ辻駅, Kidayotsutsuji-eki). On March 27, 2016, Kidayotsusuji Station was renamed to Shokokaigisho-mae Station

== Surrounding area ==
- The area is mostly residential with some stores and commercial buildings. To the south lies Shin-Kida intersection.
- Other points of interest include:
  - Fukui Prefectural Health & Welfare Center
  - Fukui Chamber of Commerce and Industry
  - Seiren Co., Ltd. Fukui headquarters
  - Fukui Nishi-Kida Post Office
  - Fukui Kasuga Post Office
  - Fujishima Shrine

== See also ==
- List of railway stations in Japan
