= Asōzu Station =

Railway station in Fukui, Japan

Asōzu Station 浅水駅
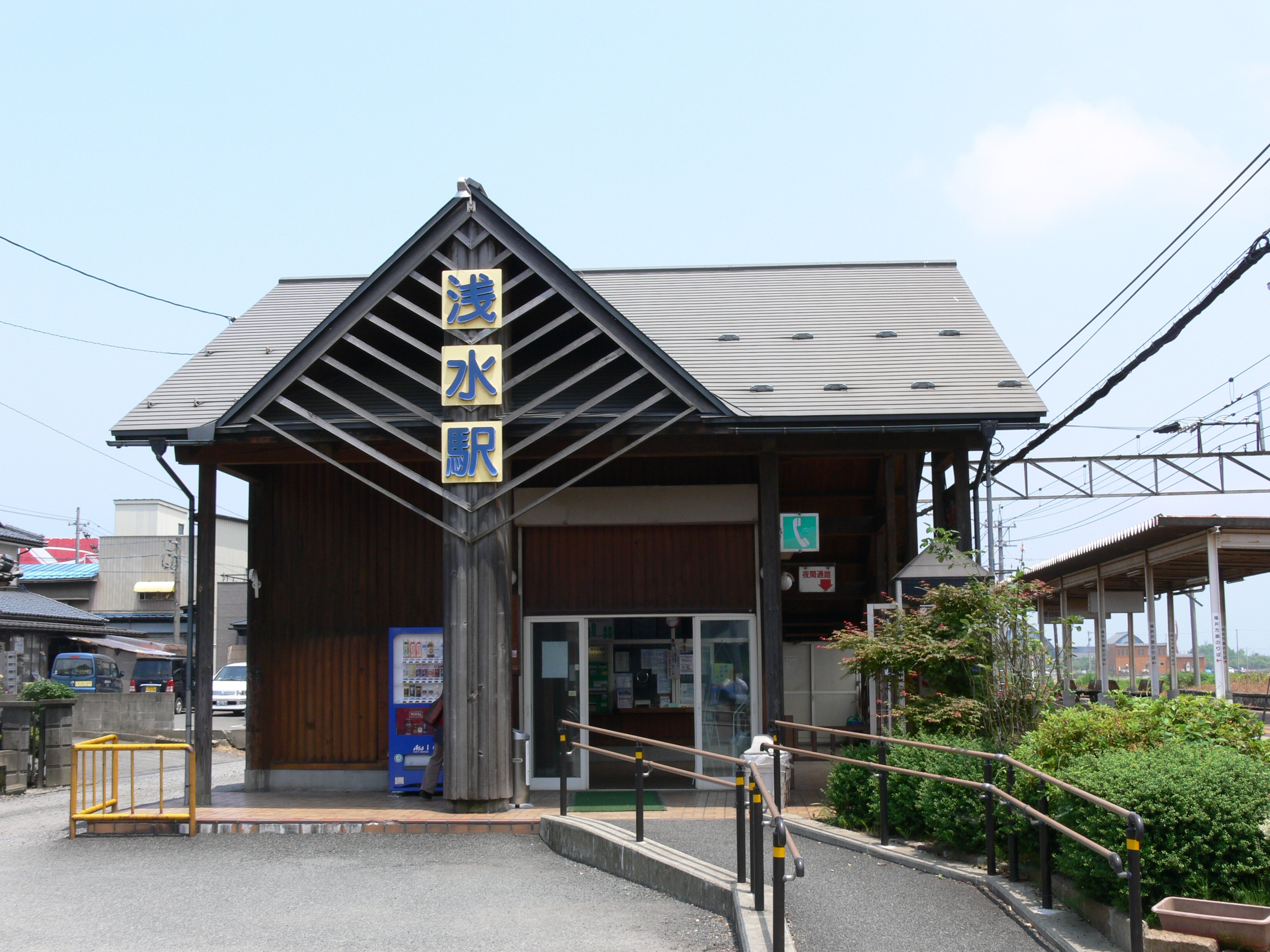
- Asōzu Station in June 2009

General information
- Location: 104-4 Asōzu-chō, Fukui-shi, Fukui-ken 918-8181; Japan
- Coordinates: 36°00′24″N 136°12′05″E
- Operator: Fukui Railway
- Line: ■ Fukubu Line
- Distance: 13.0 km from Takefu-shin
- Platforms: 1 island platform
- Tracks: 2
- Connections

Other information
- Status: Staffed
- Station code: F12
- Website: Official website

History
- Opened: July 26, 1925
Location
- Location within Japan

Asōzu Station (浅水駅, Asōzu-eki) is a Fukui Railway Fukubu Line railway station located in the city of Fukui, Fukui, Japan.

== Lines ==
Asōzu Station is served by the Fukui Railway Fukubu Line, and is located 13.0 kilometers from the terminus of the line at Takefu-shin.

== Station layout ==
The station consists of one ground-level island platform connected to the log-cabin station building by a level crossing. The station is staffed from 7:05 to 19:05.

== Adjacent stations ==
«	Service	»
Fukui Railway Fukubu Line
Shinmei	Express	Bell-mae
Taichō no Sato	Local	Harmony Hall

== History ==
The station opened on July 26, 1925. The station building was rebuilt in April 1992.

== See also ==
- List of railway stations in Japan
