= Sanjūhassha Station =

Railway station in Fukui, Japan

Sanjūhassha Station 三十八社駅
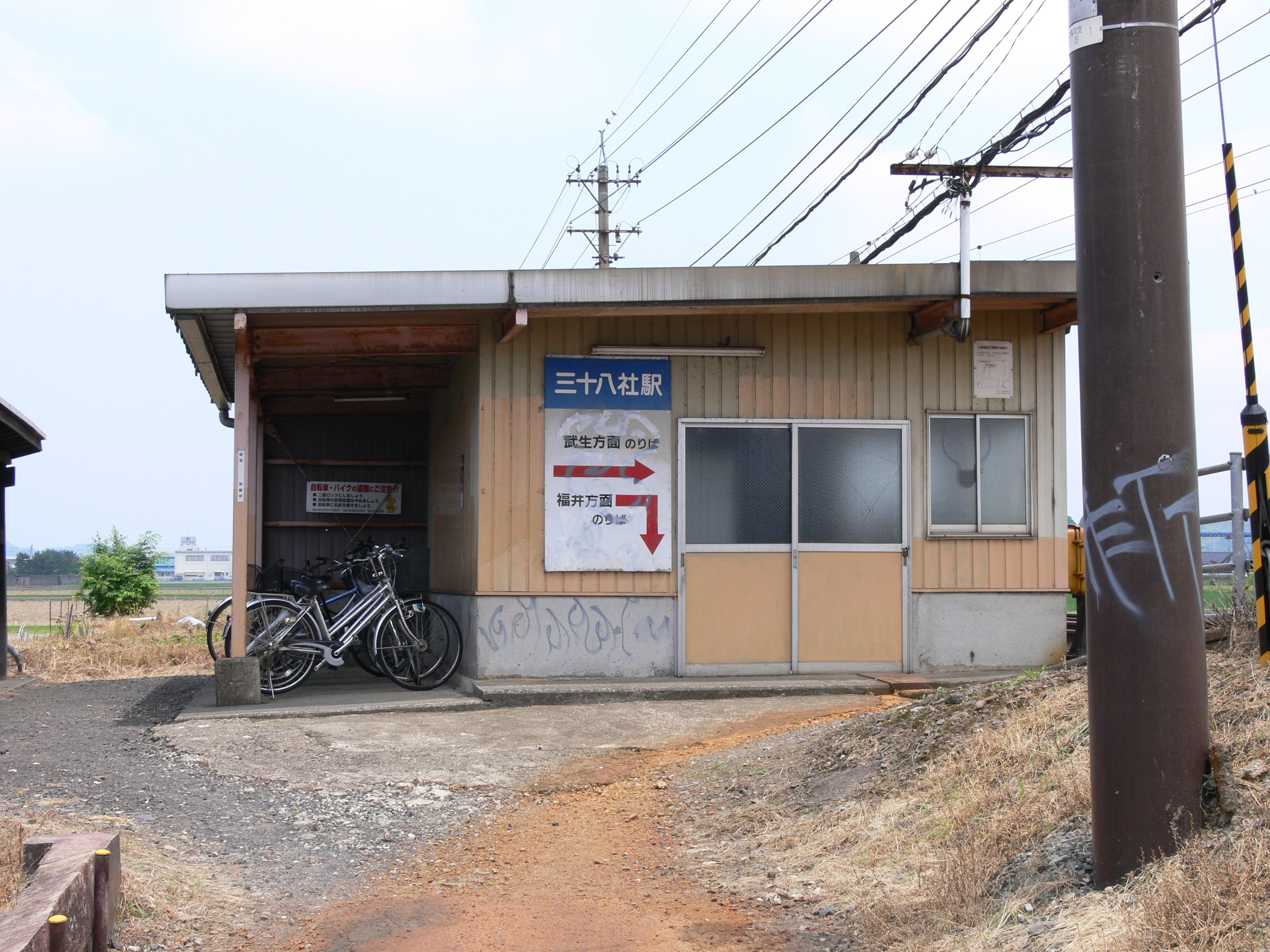
- Sanjūhassha Station in June 2009

General information
- Location: Shimo-ejiri-chō, Fukui-shi, Fukui-ken 916-0013; Japan
- Coordinates: 35°59′22″N 136°11′38″E
- Operator: Fukui Railway
- Line: ■ Fukubu Line
- Distance: 10.9 km from Takefu-shin
- Platforms: 2 side platform
- Tracks: 2
- Connections

Other information
- Status: Unstaffed
- Station code: F10
- Website: Official website

History
- Opened: June 5, 1927
Location
- Location within Japan

Sanjūhassha Station (三十八社駅, Sanjūhassha-eki) is a Fukui Railway Fukubu Line railway station located in the city of Fukui, Fukui Prefecture, Japan.

== Lines ==
Sanjūhassha Station is served by the Fukui Railway Fukubu Line, and is located 10.9 kilometers from the terminus of the line at Takefu-shin.

== Station layout ==
The station consists of two ground-level side platforms connected by a level crossing. The station is unattended.

== Adjacent stations ==
«	Service	»
Fukui Railway Fukubu Line
Express: Does not stop at this station
Tobanaka	Local	Taichō no Sato

== History ==
The station opened on June 5, 1927. The station was relocated 600 meters towards Echizen-Takefu on July 5, 1935.

== Surrounding area ==
- Although the immediate area is mostly rice fields, National Route 8 is nearby and there is some residential development.
- A fitness center is located approximately 800 meters away.

== See also ==
- List of railway stations in Japan
