= Seimei Station =

Railway station in Fukui, Japan

Seimei Station 清明駅
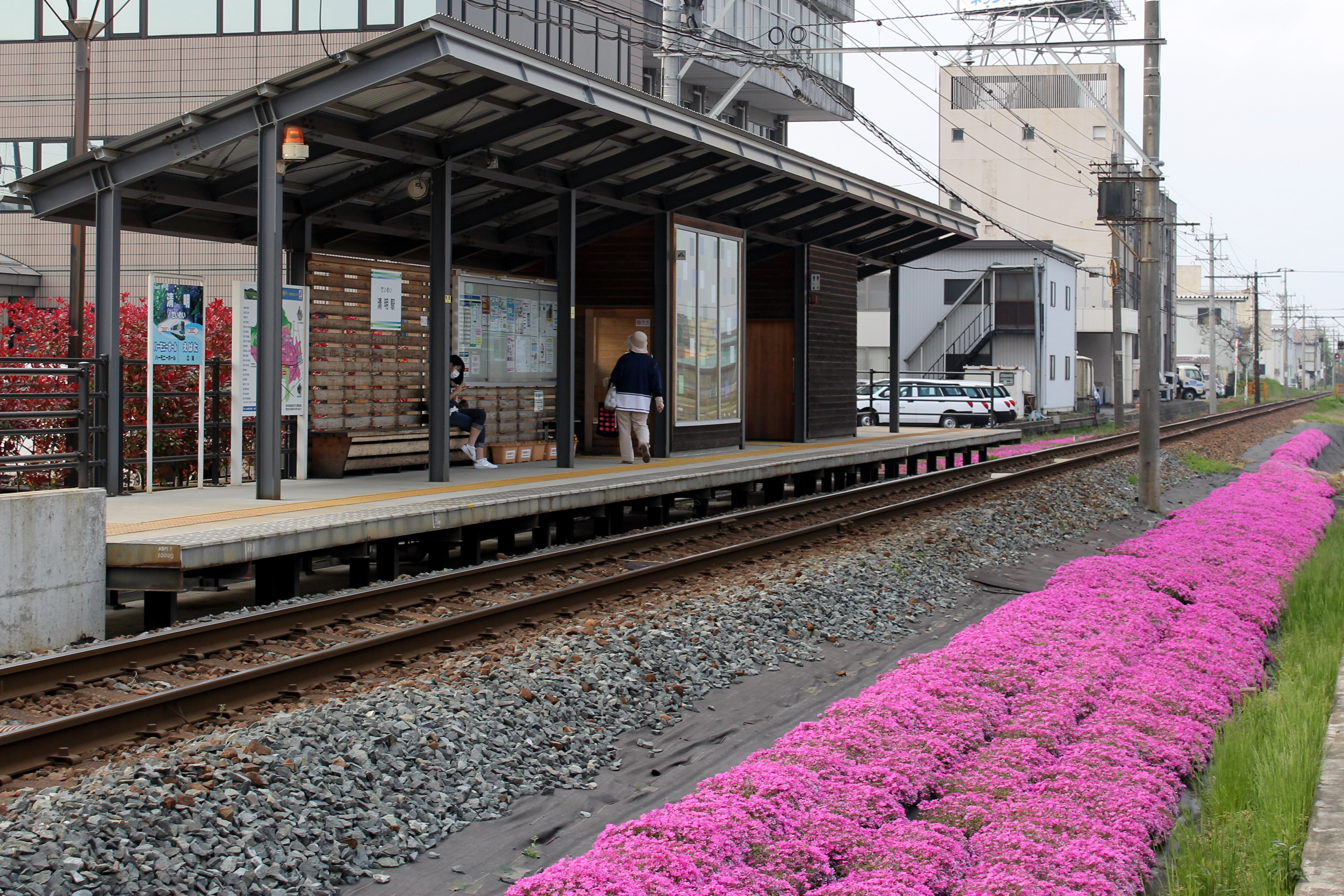
- Seimei Station in May 2013

General information
- Location: 65 Imaichi-chō, Fukui-shi, Fukui-ken 918-8152; Japan
- Coordinates: 36°01′20″N 136°12′34″E
- Operator: Fukui Railway
- Line: ■ Fukubu Line
- Distance: 14.9 km from Takefu-shin
- Platforms: 1 side platform
- Tracks: 1
- Connections

Other information
- Status: Unstaffed
- Station code: F14
- Website: Official website

History
- Opened: March 20, 2011
Location
- Location within Japan

Seimei Station (清明駅, Seimei-eki) is a Fukui Railway Fukubu Line railway station located in the city of Fukui, Fukui Prefecture, Japan.

== Lines ==
Seimei Station is served by the Fukui Railway Fukubu Line, and is located 14.9 kilometers from the terminus of the line at Takefu-shin.

== Station layout ==
The station consists of one ground-level side platform serving a single bi-directional track. The station is unattended.

== Adjacent stations ==
«	Service	»
Fukui Railway Fukubu Line
Express: Does not stop at this station
Harmony Hall	Local	Ebata

== History ==
The station opened on March 20, 2011.

== Surrounding area ==
- Fukui Prefectural Road 181
- Fukui Prefectural Road 229

== See also ==
- List of railway stations in Japan
