= Fukui Castle Ruins-daimyomachi Station =

Railway station in Fukui, Japan

Fukui Castle Ruins-daimyomachi Station 福井城址大名町駅
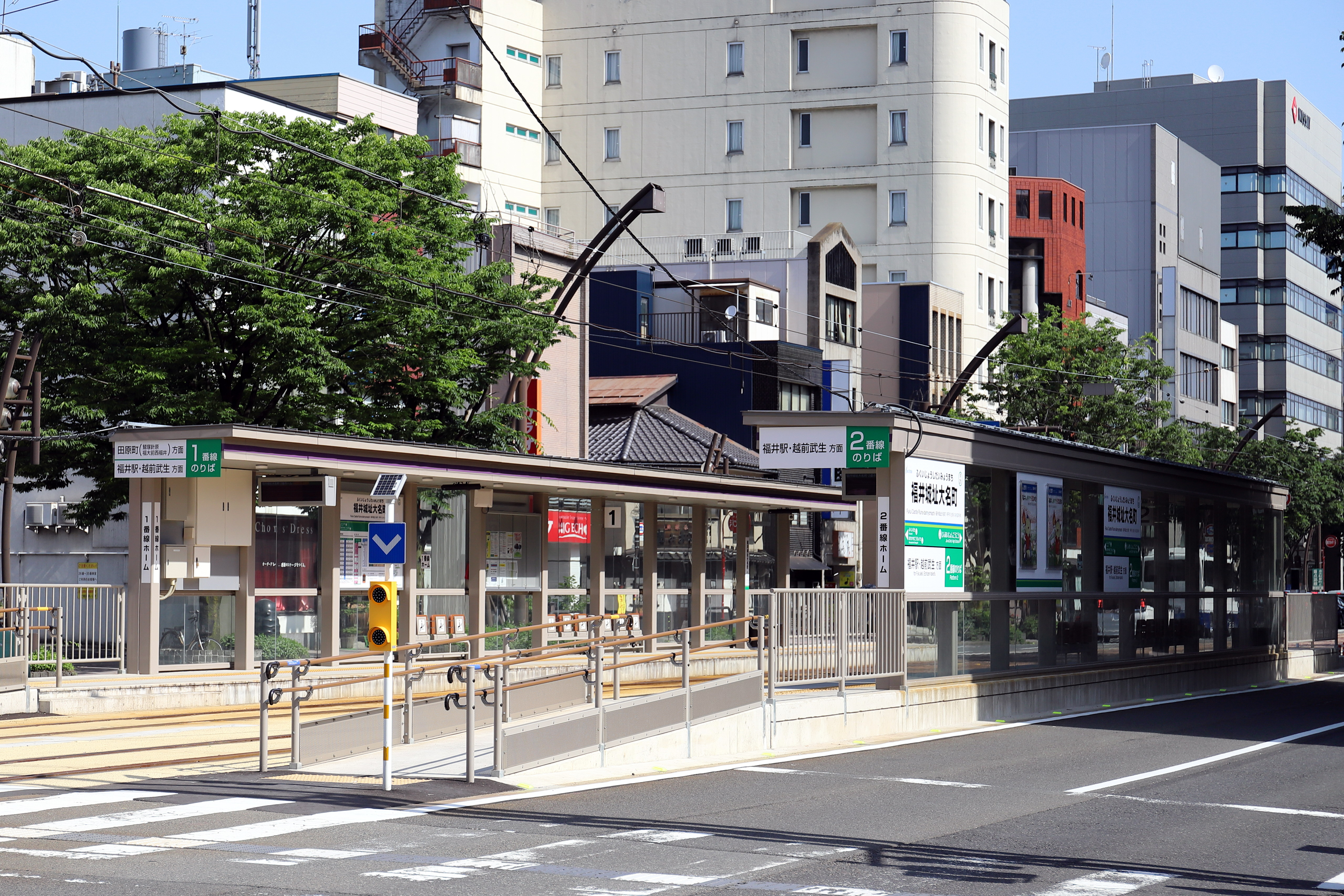
- Fukui Castle Ruins-daimyomachi Station in May 2018

General information
- Location: 3 Ōte, Fukui-shi, Fukui-ken 910-0005; Japan
- Coordinates: 36°03′48″N 136°13′03″E
- Operator: Fukui Railway
- Line: ■ Fukubu Line
- Distance: 19.3 km from Takefu-shin
- Platforms: 2 side platforms
- Tracks: 2

Other information
- Status: Unstaffed
- Station code: F22
- Website: Official website

History
- Opened: October 15, 1933
- Former names: Daimyōchō (until 1950); Shiyakushomae (until 2018)
Location
- Location within Japan

Fukui Castle Ruins-daimyomachi Station (福井城址大名町駅, Fukuijōshi-daimyōmachi-eki) is a Fukui Railway Fukubu Line station located in the city of Fukui, Fukui Prefecture, Japan.

== Lines ==
Fukui Castle Ruins-daimyomachi Station is served by the Fukui Railway Fukubu Line, and is located 19.3 kilometers from the terminus of the line at Takefu-shin. It is also the terminus of a branch line to Fukui Station. Trains heading from Echizen-Takefu Station to Fukui Station switch directions at this station as if at a switchback; other trains terminate at Tawaramachi.

== Station layout ==
The station consists of two ground-level opposed side platforms connected by a level crossing. There is no station building, but rather two raised platforms in the median of Phoenix-dōri (Prefectural Route 30) from which customers board and disembark. During peak periods a conductor is stationed on the platform to collect fares, but at other times the station is unstaffed.

== Adjacent stations ==
«	Service	»
Fukui Railway Fukubu Line
Shinmei	Special Limited Express	Terminus
Asuwayama-Koenguchi	Limited Express	Jin'ai Joshikōkō
Asuwayama-Koenguchi	Local	Jin'ai Joshikōkō
Fukui Railway Fukubu Line (spur)
Terminus	Special Limited Express	Fukui
Terminus	Limited Express	Fukui
Terminus	Local	Fukui

== History ==
The station was opened on October 15, 1933 as Daimyōchō Station (大名町駅, Daimyōchō-eki). On November 27, 1950 Daimyōchō Station was renamed Honmachi-dōri Station (本町通り駅) and Shiyakushomae Station was opened. Honmachi-dōri Station abolished on July 15, 2002 and Shiyakushomae Station renamed Fukui Castles Ruins-daimyomachi Station on March 24, 2018.

== Surrounding area ==
- Towards the west are the Fukui Prefectural Government buildings, Fukui City Hall, and the Fukui Central Post Office.
- The Fukui Textile Association building lies to the east; the Keifuku Bus Terminal is on the ground floor. Also to the east is the headquarters branch of Fukui Bank.
- Fukui Sakae Post Office is southeast of the station.

== See also ==
- List of railway stations in Japan
