= Jin'ai Joshikōkō Station =

Railway station in Fukui, Japan

Jin'ai Joshikōkō Station 仁愛女子高校駅
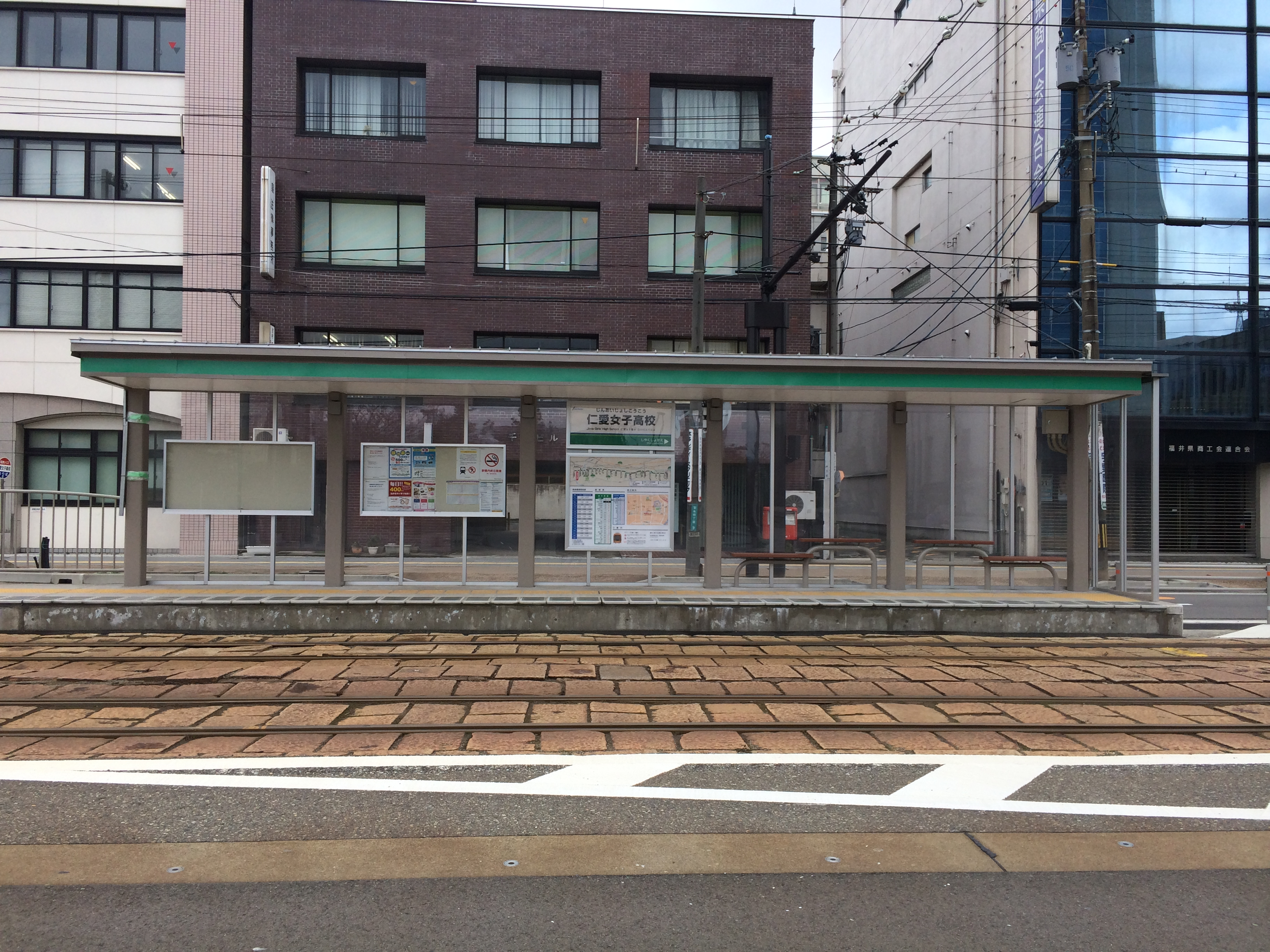
- Jin'ai Joshikōkō Station in March 2014

General information
- Location: Haruyama, Fukui-shi, Fukui-ken 910-0004; Japan
- Coordinates: 36°04′08″N 136°13′05″E
- Operator: Fukui Railway
- Line: ■ Fukubu Line
- Distance: 20.2 km from Takefu-shin
- Platforms: 2 side platforms
- Tracks: 2

Other information
- Status: Unstaffed
- Station code: F23
- Website: Official website

History
- Opened: November 27, 1950
- Former names: Saibanshomae (to 2010)
Location
- Location within Japan

Jin'ai Joshikōkō Station (仁愛女子高校駅, Jin'ai Joshikōkō eki) is a Fukui Railway Fukubu Line railway station located in the city of Fukui, Fukui Prefecture, Japan.

== Lines ==
Jin'ai Joshikōkō Station is served by the Fukui Railway Fukubu Line, and is located 20.2 kilometers from the terminus of the line at Takefu-shin.

== Station layout ==
The station consists of two ground-level opposed side platforms connected by a level crossing. There is no station building, but rather two raised platforms in the median of Phoenix-dōri (Prefectural Route 30) from which customers board and disembark.

== Adjacent stations ==
«	Service	»
Fukui Railway Fukubu Line
Express: Does not stop at this station
Fukui Castle Ruins-daimyomachi	Local	Tawaramachi

== History ==
The station was opened on November 27, 1950 as Saibanshomae Station (裁判所前駅, Saibanshomae-eki). On December 11, 1964 Matsumoto-dōri Station abolished and Saibanshomae Station moved 200 meters towards Tawaramachi Station The station was renamed as Jin'ai Joshikōkō Station on March 25, 2010

== Surrounding area ==
- Courts Building: Fukui District Court, Fukui Family Court, Fukui Summary Court
- Fukui Haruyama Government Building
- Fukui Notary Public Office
- Fukui Nishikimachi Post Office
- Fukui Haruyama Post Office
- Fukui Hōei Post Office
- Jin-ai Girls' High School
- Shinmei Shrine
- Fukui Fujita Art Museum
- Fukui Shimbun Sakura-dōri Building
- Fukui City History Museum
- Fukui City Cultural Center
- Fukui Citizens' Welfare Hall
- Fukui Daibutsu
- Jōdo Shinshū Ōtani Sect (Higashi-Honganji) Fukui Branch Temple

== See also ==
- List of railway stations in Japan
