= Asuwayama-Koenguchi Station =

Railway station in Fukui, Japan

Asuwayama-Koenguchi Station 足羽山公園口駅
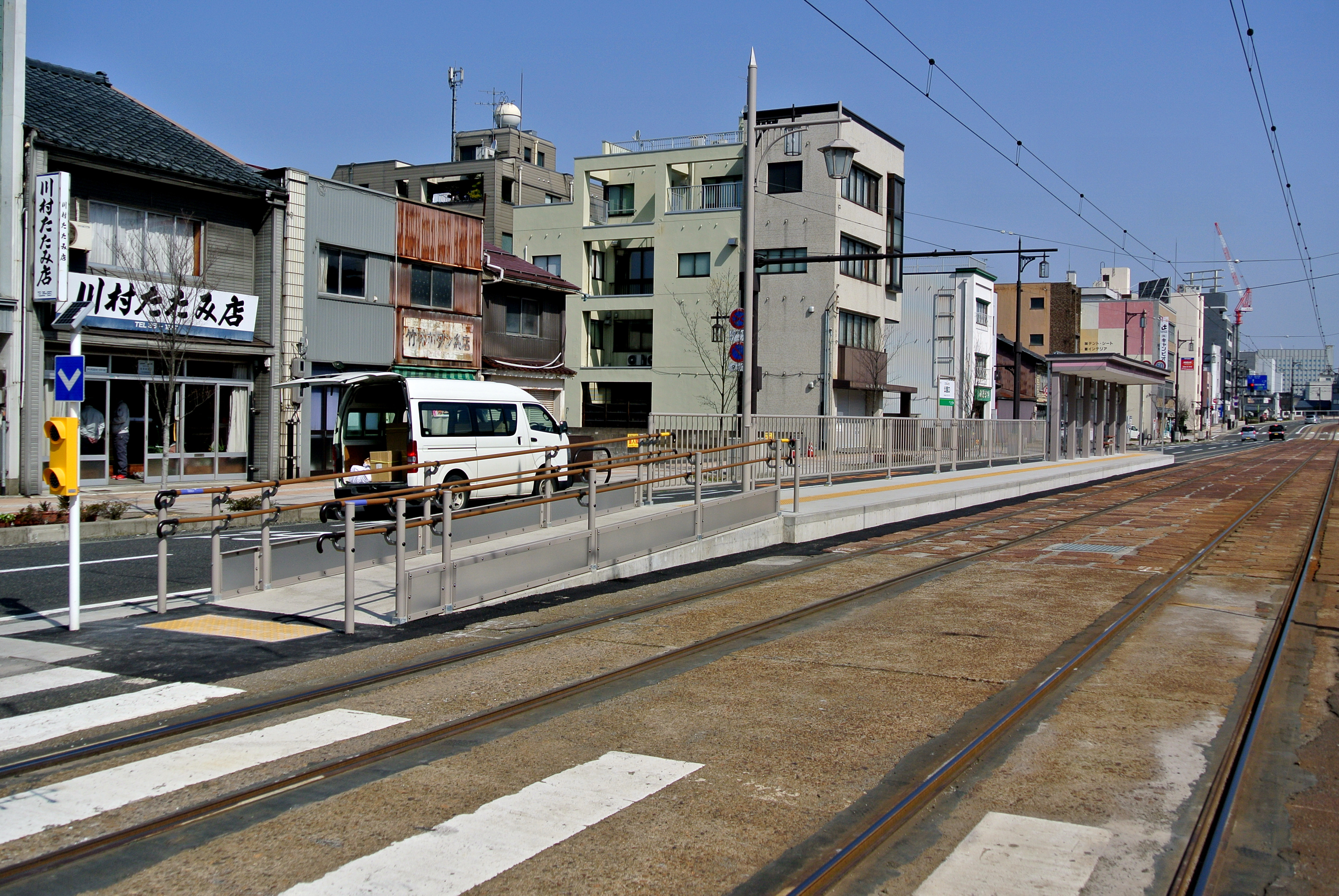
- Asuwayama-Koenguchi Station Platform in March 2013

General information
- Location: Keya, Fukui-shi, Fukui-ken 918-8003; Japan
- Coordinates: 36°03′29″N 136°12′55″E
- Operator: Fukui Railway
- Line: ■ Fukubu Line
- Distance: 18.9 km from Takefu-shin
- Platforms: 2 side platforms
- Tracks: 2

Other information
- Status: Unstaffed
- Station code: F20
- Website: Official website

History
- Opened: November 27, 1950
- Former names: Keyamachi (until 1962); Kōenguchi (until 2016)
Location
- Location within Japan

Asuwayama-Kōenguchi Station (足羽山公園口駅, Asuwayama-Kōenguchi-eki) is a Fukui Railway Fukubu Line station located in the city of Fukui, Fukui, Japan.

== Lines ==
Asuwayama-Kōenguchi Station is served by the Fukui Railway Fukubu Line, and is located 18.9 kilometers from the terminus of the line at Takefu-shin.

== Station layout ==
The station consists of two ground-level opposed side platforms connected by a level crossing. There is no station building, but rather two raised platforms in the median of Phoenix-dōri (Prefectural Route 30) from which customers board and disembark.

== Adjacent stations ==
«	Service	»
Fukui Railway Fukubu Line
Shokokaigisho-mae	Express	Fukui Castle Ruins-daimyomachi
Shokokaigisho-mae	Local	Fukui Castle Ruins-daimyomachi

== History ==
The station was opened on October 15, 1933 as Keyamachi Station (毛矢町駅, Keyamachi-eki). On April 1, 1962 Keyamachi Station moved 100 meters towards Kidayotsutsuji Station; renamed to Kōenguchi Station (公園口駅, Kōenguchi-eki). On March 27, 2016: Kōenguchi Station renamed to Asuwayama-Koenguchi Station; promoted to an express train stop.

== Surrounding area ==
- The Asuwa River lies to the north, Mount Asuwa to the west — both are popular urban oases. Lining the banks of the Asuwa River are 600 cherry blossom trees stretching 2.2 kilometers. Mount Asuwa is home to several parks, including a small zoo and athletic fields.
- Offices, shops, and homes are clustered around the station.
- Other points of interest include:
  - Fukui Keya Post Office
  - Fukui Municipal Natural History Museum
  - Akemi Tachibana Literature Memorial Museum
  - Fukui City Atagozaka Tea Ceremony Museum
  - Fukui City Water Museum
  - Emori Shōji company headquarters
  - Sanai Park

== See also ==
- List of railway stations in Japan
