= Tobanaka Station =

Railway station in Sabae, Fukui prefecture, Japan

Tobanaka Station 鳥羽中駅
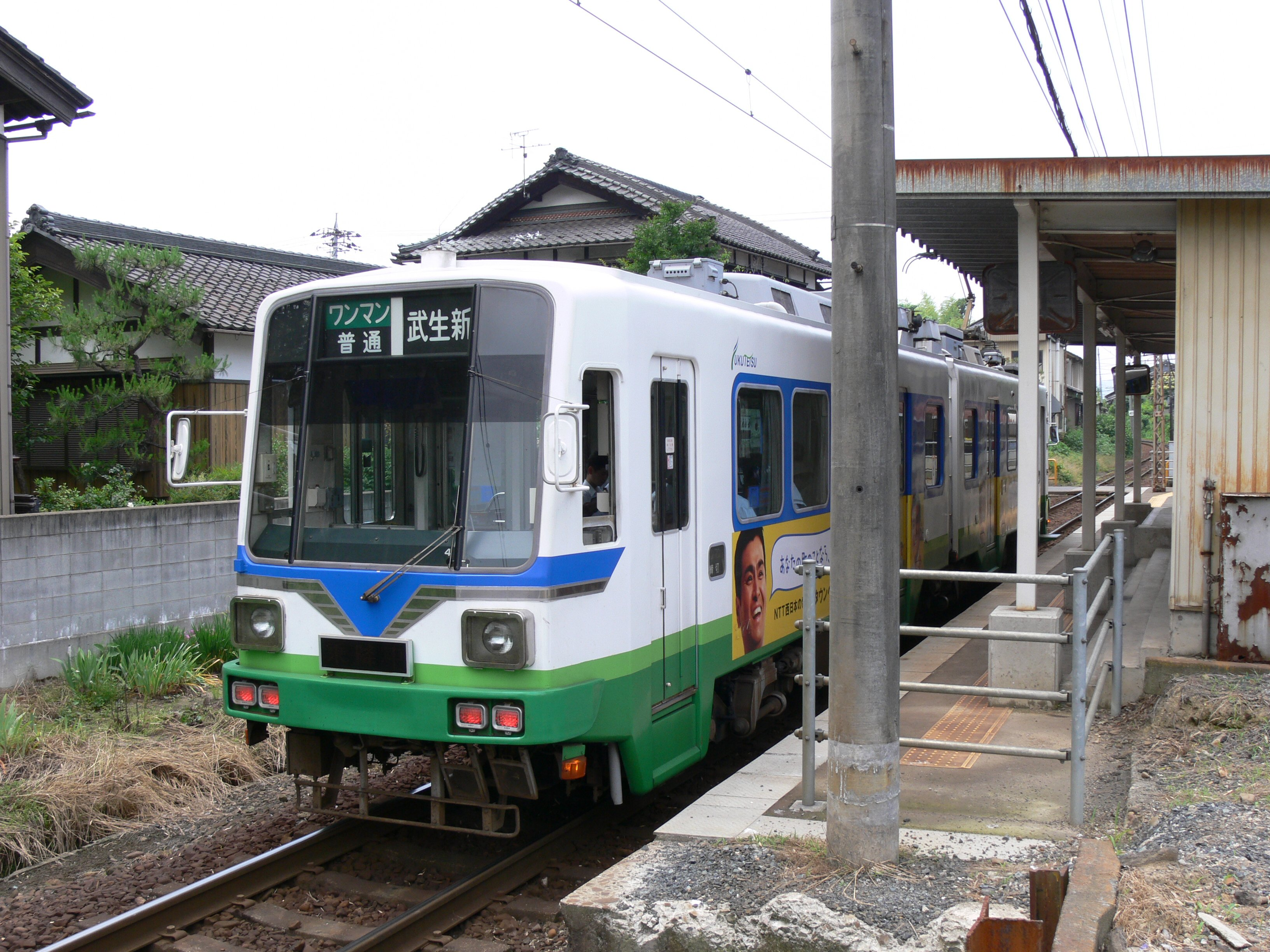
- Fukutetsu 770 Series train at Tobanaka Station

General information
- Location: 5-2-20 Shinmei-chō, Sabae-shi, Fukui-ken 916-0017; Japan
- Coordinates: 35°58′54″N 136°11′15″E
- Operator: Fukui Railway
- Line: ■ Fukubu Line
- Distance: 9.7 km from Takefu-shin
- Platforms: 1 side platform
- Tracks: 1
- Connections

Other information
- Status: Staffed
- Station code: F9
- Website: Official website

History
- Opened: October 1, 1935

Passengers
- FY2015: 72
Location
- Location within Japan

Tobanaka Station (鳥羽中駅, Tobanaka-eki) is a Fukui Railway Fukubu Line railway station located in the city of Sabae, Fukui Prefecture, Japan.

== Lines ==
Tobanaka Station is served by the Fukui Railway Fukubu Line, and is located 9.7 kilometers from the terminus of the line at Takefu-shin.

== Station layout ==
The station consists of one ground-level side platform serving a single bi-directional track. The station is unattended.

== Adjacent stations ==
«	Service	»
Fukui Railway Fukubu Line
Express: Does not stop at this station
Shinmei	Local	Sanjuhassha

== History ==
The station opened on October 1, 1935. A new station building was completed in September 1990.

== Passenger statistics ==
In fiscal 2015, the station was used by an average of 72 passengers daily (boarding passengers only).

== Surrounding area ==
- The station is surrounded by homes and small factories. Tobanaka Elementary School is also nearby.

== See also ==
- List of railway stations in Japan
