= Sports Kōen Station =

Railway station in Echizen, Japan

Sports Kōen Station スポーツ公園駅
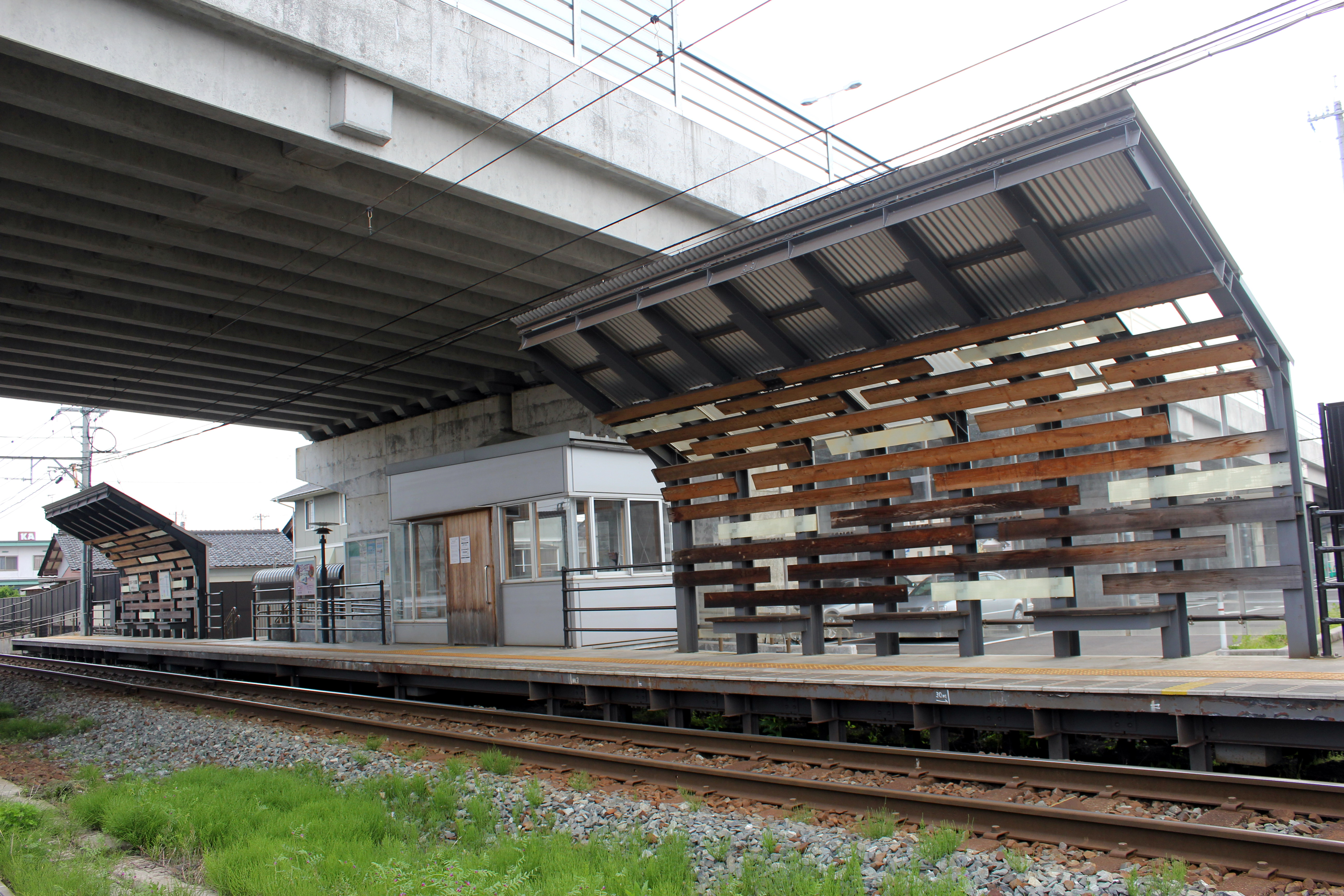
- Sports Kōen Station in May 2013

General information
- Location: 99-15 Iehisa-chō, Echizen-shi, Fukui-ken 915-0801; Japan
- Coordinates: 35°55′10″N 136°10′5.5″E
- Operator: Fukui Railway
- Line: ■ Fukubu Line
- Distance: 1.7 km from Takefu-shin
- Platforms: 1 side platform
- Tracks: 1
- Connections

Other information
- Status: Unstaffed
- Station code: F2
- Website: Official website

History
- Opened: March 25, 2010
Location
- Location within Japan

Sports Kōen Station (スポーツ公園駅, Supotsu Kōen-eki) is a Fukui Railway Fukubu Line railway station located in the city of Echizen, Fukui Prefecture, Japan.

== Lines ==
Sports Kōen Station is served by the Fukui Railway Fukubu Line, and is located 1.7 kilometers from the terminus of the line at Takefu-shin.

== Station layout ==
The station consists of one ground-level side platform serving a single bi-directional track. The station is unattended.

== Adjacent stations ==
«	Service	»
Fukui Railway Fukubu Line
Express: Does not stop at this station
Kitago	Local	Iehisa

== History ==
The station opened on March 25, 2010.

== Surrounding area ==
- Iehisa Sports Park
- Fukui Prefectural Road 212

== See also ==
- List of railway stations in Japan
