= Sundome Nishi Station =

Railway station in Sabae, Fukui prefecture, Japan

Sundome Nishi Station サンドーム西駅
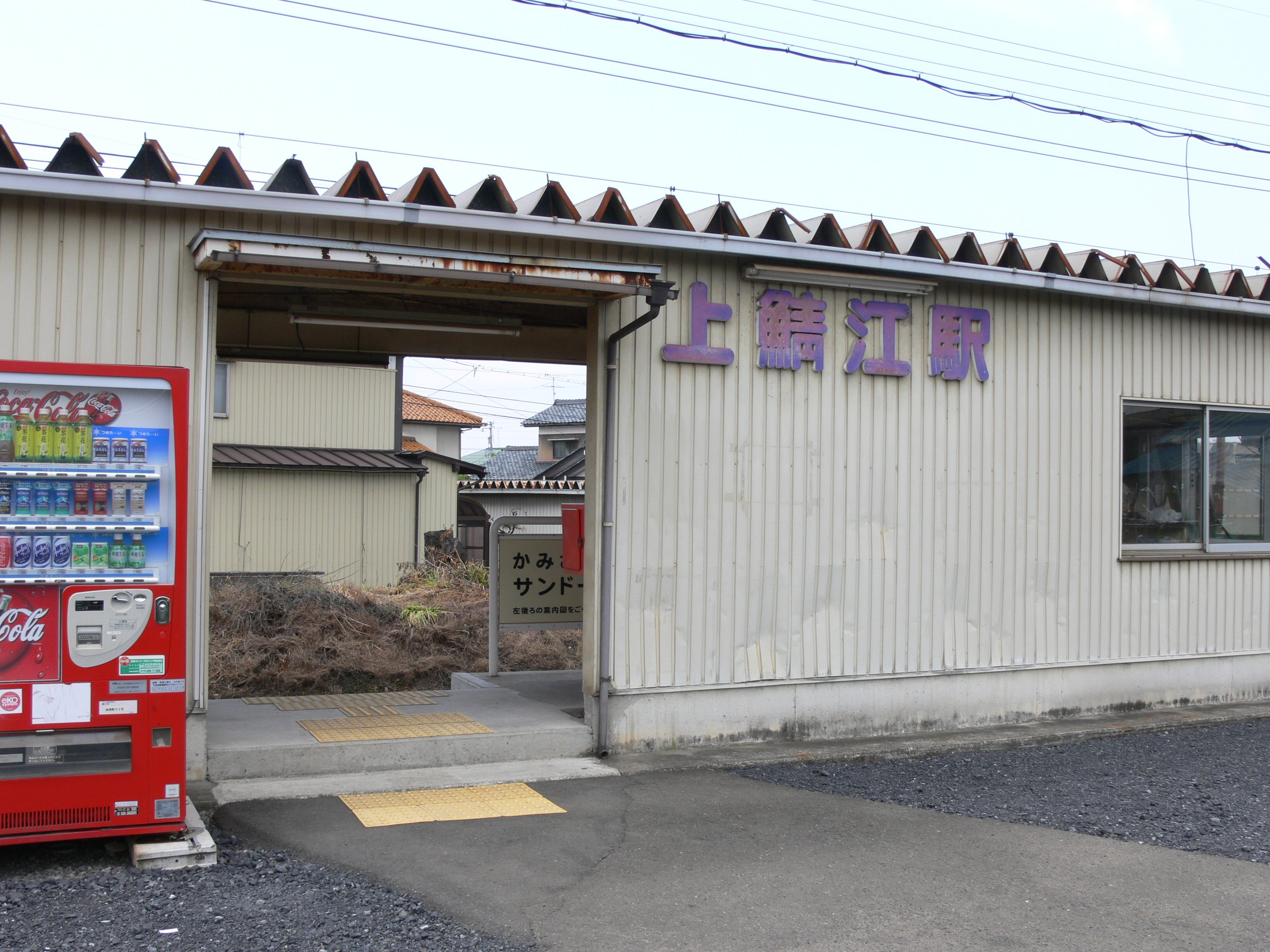
- Station entrance

General information
- Location: 1-13 Kami-Sabae, Sabae-shi, Fukui-ken 916-0054; Japan
- Coordinates: 35°56′11″N 136°10′50″E
- Operator: Fukui Railway
- Line: ■ Fukubu Line
- Distance: 4.1 km from Takefu-shin
- Platforms: 1 side platform
- Tracks: 1
- Connections

Other information
- Status: Unstaffed
- Station code: F4
- Website: Official website

History
- Opened: February 23, 1924
- Former names: Kami-Sabae (to 2010)

Passengers
- FY2015: 90
Location
- Location within Japan

Sundome Nishi Station (サンドーム西駅, Sandōmu-nishi-eki) is a Fukui Railway Fukubu Line railway station located in the city of Sabae, Fukui Prefecture, Japan.

== Lines ==
Sundome Nishi Station is served by the Fukui Railway Fukubu Line, and is located 4.1 kilometers from the terminus of the line at Takefu-shin.

== Station layout ==
The station consists of one ground-level side platform serving a single bi-directional track. The station is unattended.

== Adjacent stations ==
«	Service	»
Fukui Railway Fukubu Line
Express: Does not stop at this station
Iehisa	Local	Nishi-Sabae

== History ==
The station opened on August 13, 1929 as Kami-Sabae Station (上鯖江駅, Kami-sabae-eki) and was renamed to the present name on March 25, 2010.

== Passenger statistics ==
In fiscal 2015, the station was used by an average of 90 passengers daily (boarding passengers only).

== Surrounding area ==
The station serves a predominantly residential area of Sabae. Sabae High School and the Sundome Fukui event hall are also nearby.

== See also ==
- List of railway stations in Japan
