= Shinmei Station (Fukui) =

Railway station in Sabae, Fukui prefecture, Japan

Shinmei Station 神明駅
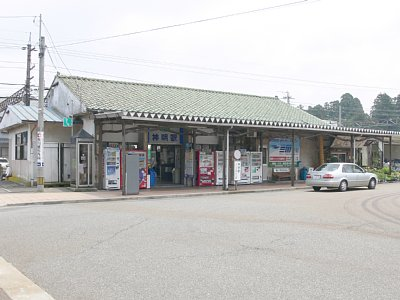
- Shinmei Station

General information
- Location: 1-7-6 Shinmei-chō, Sabae-shi, Fukui-ken 916-0017; Japan
- Coordinates: 35°58′22″N 136°10′54″E
- Operator: Fukui Railway
- Line: ■ Fukubu Line
- Distance: 8.5 km from Takefu-shin
- Platforms: 1 side +1 island platform
- Tracks: 3
- Connections

Other information
- Status: Staffed
- Station code: F8
- Website: Official website

History
- Opened: February 23, 1924
- Former names: Heiei; Chūō (until 1946)

Passengers
- FY2015: 667
Location
- Location within Japan

Shinmei Station (神明駅, Shinmei-eki) is a Fukui Railway Fukubu Line railway station located in Sabae, Fukui Prefecture, Japan.

== Lines ==
Shinmei Station is served by the Fukui Railway Fukubu Line, and is located 8.5 kilometers from the terminus of the line at Takefu-shin.

== Station layout ==
The station consists of one ground-level side platform and one island platform connected by a level crossing. The station is staffed.

== Adjacent stations ==
«	Service	»
Fukui Railway Fukubu Line
Takefu-shin	Special Limited Express	Fukui Castle Ruins-daimyomachi
Mizuochi	Limited Express	Asozu
Mizuochi	Local	Tobanaka

== History ==
The station opened on February 23, 1924, as Heiei Station (兵営駅). It was renamed Chūō Station (中央駅) in April 1939. The station was renamed to its present name in June 1946.

== Passenger statistics ==
In fiscal 2015, the station was used by an average of 667 passengers daily (boarding passengers only).

== Surrounding area ==
- Shinmei Shrine
- "Shinmei-En" hot spring hotel

== See also ==
- List of railway stations in Japan
