= Paul Tappenden =

Paul Tappenden (March 23, 1947 - October 4, 2021) was an English American teacher, artist and naturalist known as the Rockland Forager.

Tappenden studied at Milton Keynes College and subsequently taught in Bermuda before beginning to work in the United States as an artist and set designer.

Later in his life, Tappenden was known for his Nyack, New York murals and the village hosted two art exhibitions in his memory. An additional exhibition was held in Harmony Hall in Sloatsburg, New York.

He died of kidney disease and COVID 19 in October 2021.
