= Harmony Hall =

Harmony Hall may refer to:

== NRHP-listed buildings in the United States ==
- Harmony Hall (Hampden, Maine), a 1929 religious and civic building
- Harmony Hall (Fort Washington, Maryland), part of the National Capital Parks-East system
- Jacob Sloat House, formerly called Harmony Hall, late 1840s house, Sloatsburg, New York
- Harmony Hall (Kinston, North Carolina), an 18th-century house
- Harmony Hall (White Oak, North Carolina), an 18th-century house

== Other uses ==
- Harmony Hall (Scottish Borders) is a large house open to the public in Melrose in Scotland.
- Harmony Hall (Columbia University), an undergraduate dormitory on the West Campus of Columbia University, New York City, New York, United States
- Harmony Hall (Hampshire, UK), a short-lived, utopian socialist community founded by Robert Owen in 1839
- "Harmony Hall" (song), a single by Vampire Weekend from the 2019 album Father of the Bride
- Harmony Hall Fukui, a concert hall located in Fukui, Fukui, Japan
- Harmony Hall Station, a railway station in the city of Fukui, Fukui, Japan
- Harmony Halls, a barbershop quartet from the 1940s
