= Kitago Station =

Railway station in Echizen, Fukui prefecture, Japan

Kitago Station 北府駅
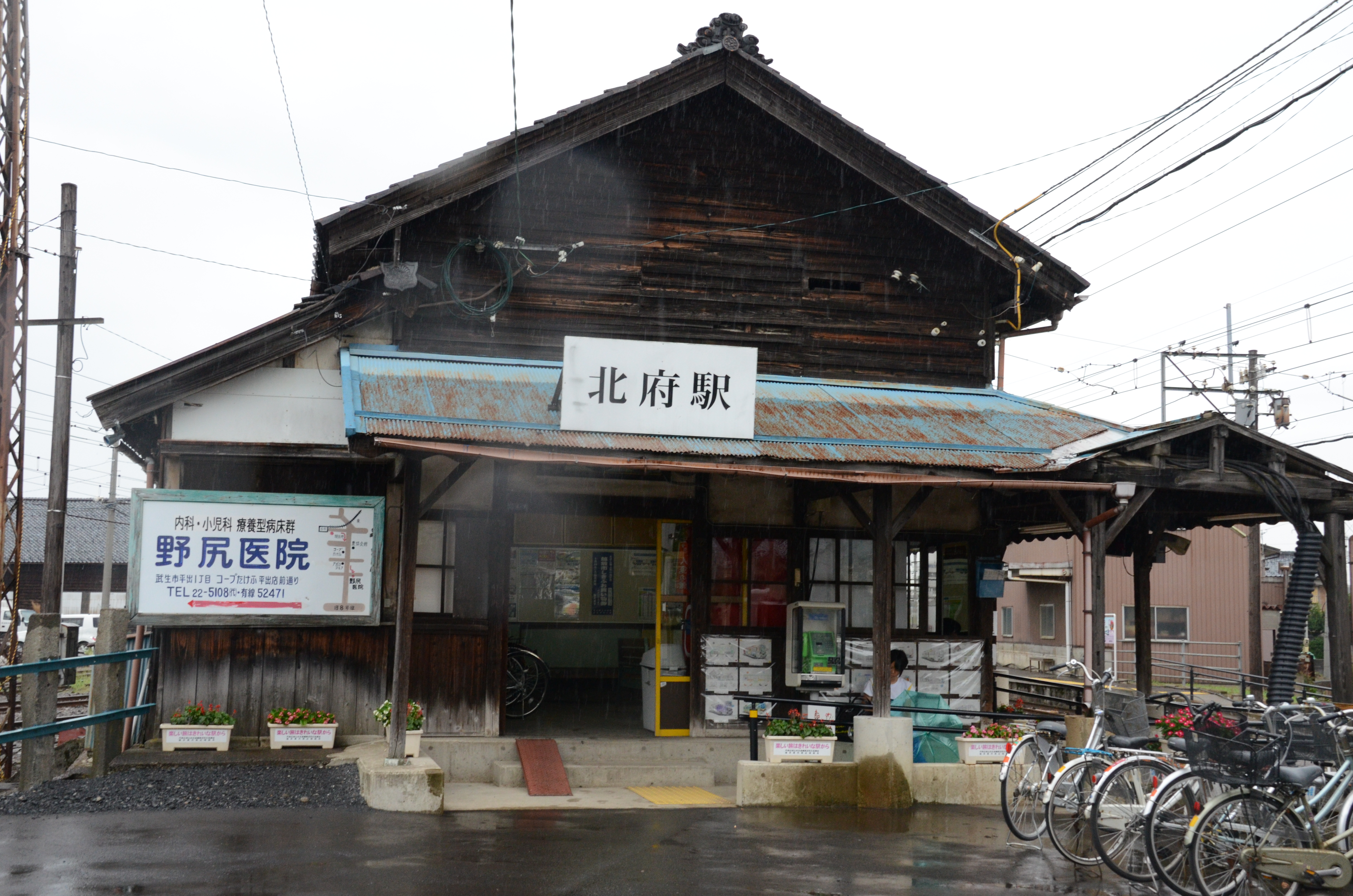
- Kitago Station entrance

General information
- Location: 2-3-20 Kitago, Echizen-shi, Fukui-ken 915-0802; Japan
- Coordinates: 35°54′36″N 136°10′00″E
- Operator: Fukui Railway
- Line: ■ Fukubu Line
- Distance: 0.6 km from Takefu-shin
- Platforms: 2 side platforms
- Tracks: 2
- Connections

Other information
- Status: Unstaffed
- Station code: F1
- Website: Official website

History
- Opened: February 23, 1924
- Former names: Nishi-Takefu (to 2010)
Location
- Location within Japan

Kitago Station (北府駅, Kitago-eki) is a Fukui Railway Fukubu Line railway station located in the city of Echizen, Fukui Prefecture, Japan.

== Lines ==
Kitago Station is served by the Fukui Railway Fukubu Line, and is located 0.6 kilometers from the terminus of the line at Takefu-shin.

== Station layout ==
The station consists of two ground-level side platforms connected to the wooden station building by a level crossing. The station is unattended, but there is a public telephone and vending machine available.

== Adjacent stations ==
«	Service	»
Fukui Railway Fukubu Line
Express: Does not stop at this station
Takefu-shin	Local	Sports Kōen

== History ==
The station opened on February 23, 1924, as Nishi-Takefu Station (西武生駅, Nishi-Takefu-eki) and was renamed to the present name on March 25, 2010.

== Surrounding area ==
- Fukui Railway company headquarters
- Fukui Railway train maintenance facility and bus depot
- Takefu High School

== See also ==
- List of railway stations in Japan
