= Harmony Hall Station =

Railway station in Fukui, Japan

Harmony Hall Station ハーモニーホール駅
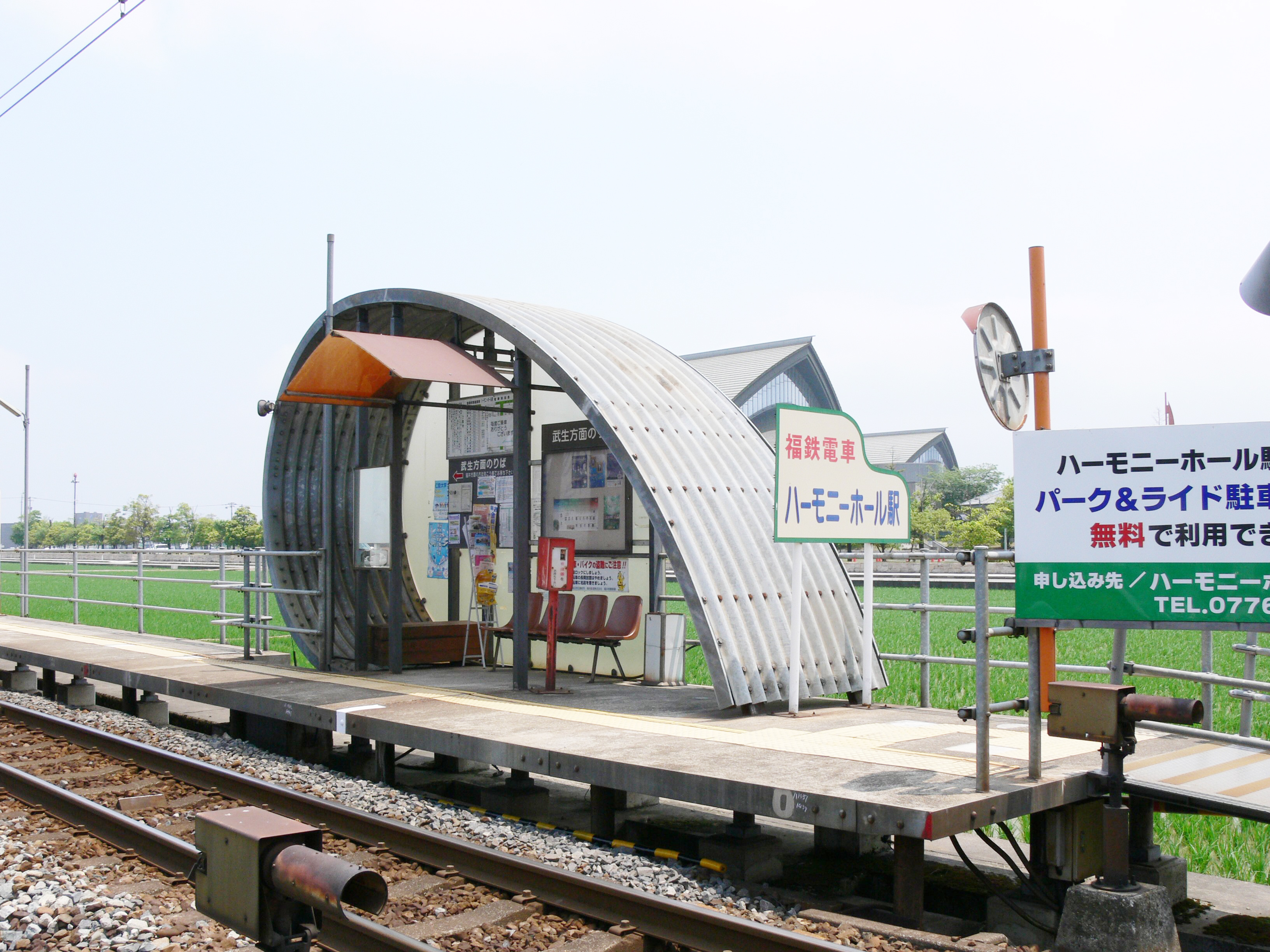
- Harmony Hall Station in June 2009

General information
- Location: 37 Imaichi-chō, Fukui-shi, Fukui-ken 918-8152; Japan
- Coordinates: 36°00′50″N 136°12′19″E
- Operator: Fukui Railway
- Line: ■ Fukubu Line
- Distance: 13.8 km from Takefu-shin
- Platforms: 1 side platform
- Tracks: 1
- Connections

Other information
- Status: Unstaffed
- Station code: F13
- Website: Official website

History
- Opened: September 20, 1997
Location
- Location within Japan

Harmony Hall Station (ハーモニーホール駅, Hāmonī-Hōru-eki) is a Fukui Railway Fukubu Line railway station located in the city of Fukui, Fukui Prefecture, Japan. It is next to Harmony Hall, a public auditorium and music venue.

== Lines ==
Harmony Hall Station is served by the Fukui Railway Fukubu Line. It is located 13.8 kilometers from the terminus of the line at Takefu-shin.

== Station layout ==
The station consists of one ground-level side platform serving a single bi-directional track. The station is unattended.

== Adjacent stations ==
«	Service	»
Fukui Railway Fukubu Line
Express: Does not stop at this station
Asōzu	Local	Seimei

== History ==
The station opened on September 20, 1997. In 2000 the station design recognized by the Ministry of Land, Infrastructure and Transport's Chubu District Transport Bureau

== Surrounding area ==
- The station is between two major roads linking Fukui and Echizen (National Route 8 and Prefectural Route 229).
- The main point of interest is Harmony Hall Fukui, a music hall operated by the prefectural government.

== See also ==
- List of railway stations in Japan
