= Mitsumine Castle =

Coordinates: 35°58′20″N 136°16′29″E

Mitsumine Castle (三峰城, Mitsumine-jō) was a castle in present-day Sabae, Fukui Prefecture, Japan.

== History ==
It was constructed during the Nanboku-chō period of the 14th century (part of the early Muromachi period). In 1337, following the war between the Southern and Northern courts, Mitsumine Castle was built as a strong strategic point atop Mt. Mitsumine (from which it received its name).

It was governed over by Wakiya Yoshisuke, under the orders of Nitta Yoshisada, the high ranking general of the Southern Court. However, in 1340 Miyama Shigeyuki of the Northern Court laid siege to the castle. This siege ended with the death of Miyama and destruction of the castle.
