= Sabae =

City in Fukui Prefecture, Japan

Sabae 鯖江市
- City
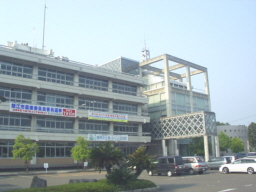
- Sabae City Hall

- Flag Seal

- Location of Sabae in Fukui Prefecture

- Location of Sabae in Japan
- Coordinates: 35°57′23.3″N 136°11′3.4″E
- Country: Japan
- Region: Chūbu (Hokuriku)
- Prefecture: Fukui

Government
  - Mayor: Katsuhisa Sasaki (since October 2020)

Area
  - Total: 84.59 km^{2} (32.66 sq mi)

Population (March 1, 2026)
  - Total: 67,932
  - Density: 803.1/km^{2} (2,080/sq mi)
- Time zone: UTC+09:00 (Japan Standard Time)
- Phone number: 0778-51-2200
- Address: Nishiyamacho 13-1, Sabae-shi, Fukui-ken 916-8666
- Website: www.city.sabae.fukui.jp
- Symbols
- Bird: Aix galericulata
- Flower: Azalea
- Tree: Sakura

Aerial photograph of the Sabae city center (2021)

Sabae (鯖江市, Sabae-shi) is a city located in Fukui Prefecture, Japan. As of 1 March 2026, the city had an estimated population of 67,932 in 26,546 households and the population density of 820 persons per km^{2}. The total area of the city is 84.59 square kilometres (32.66 sq mi).

== Geography ==
Sabae is located in central Fukui Prefecture, bordered by the city Fukui to the north and Echizen to the south. The Sabae Basin, situated between the Fukui Plain and the Takefu Basin, dominates the area. The urban area, which stretches long and narrow from north-to-south in its central part, extends beyond the border with Fukui City at its northern end. Within this basin, Mount Chōsenji (113 meters) with its gentle slopes is also largely urbanized. The urban area is divided into two parts: the Shinmei area, centered around Shinmei Station on the Fukui Railway Fukubu Line, and the Sabae area, centered around Sabae Station on the Happy Line Fukui Line (formerly the Hokuriku Main Line) and Nishi-Sabae Station on the Fukui Railway Fukubu Line. The city hall is located near the border between these two areas. The Kawada district, at the eastern end, is mountainous. The Japan Ground Self-Defense Force Sabae Garrison is located in the northwestern part of the city.

=== Neighbouring municipalities ===
Fukui Prefecture

- Echizen
- Echizen (town)
- Fukui
- Ikeda

=== Climate ===
Sabae has a humid subtropical climate (Cfa per the Köppen climate classification system), characterized by warm, wet summers and cold winters with heavy snowfall. The average annual temperature in Sabae is 14.3 °C. The average annual rainfall is 2417 mm with September as the wettest month. The temperatures are highest on average in August, at around 26.8 °C, and lowest in January, at around 3.0 °C.

== Demographics ==
Per Japanese census data, the population of Sabae has grown steadily over the past 50 years.

Historical population
Year	Pop.	±%
1970	52,612	—
1980	59,579	+13.2%
1990	62,283	+4.5%
2000	64,898	+4.2%
2010	67,450	+3.9%
2020	68,302	+1.3%

== History ==
Sabae is part of ancient Echizen Province. During the Edo period, the area was part of the holdings of Sabae Domain. Following the Meiji restoration, it was organised into part of Imadate District in Fukui Prefecture. With the establishment of the modern municipalities system on April 1, 1889, the town of Sabae was established. It merged with the villages of Shinyokoe and Funatsu in 1948, and with the villages of Shinmei, Katakami, Nakagawa, and the villages of Tachimachi, Yoshikawa and Yutaka from Nyū District to form the city of Sabae on January 15, 1955. The city annexed the village of Kawada in March 1957. In 1995, the city was host to the World Gymnastics Championships

== Government ==
Sabae has a mayor-council form of government with a directly elected mayor and a unicameral city legislature of 20 members. Sabae contributes three members to the Fukui Prefectural Assembly. In terms of national politics, the city is part of the Fukui 2nd district of the lower house of the Diet of Japan.

== Economy ==
Sabae is one of the largest manufacturing centers of eyeglass frames in Japan. Sabae is also home to a significant chemical and rayon industry.

== Education ==
Sabae has 12 public elementary schools and three middle schools operated by the city government, and one public high school operated by the Fukui Prefectural Board of Education. . The National Institute of Technology, Fukui College (NIT-Fukui), operated by the national government, is also located in Sabae.

== Transportation ==
=== Railway ===
JR West surrendered ownership of the Hokuriku Main Line in Sabae to third-sector company Hapi-line Fukui on 16 March 2024.

- Hapi-line Fukui
  - Sabae, Kita-Sabae
- Fukui Railway Fukubu Line
  - Sundome Nishi - Nishi-Sabae - Nishiyama-Kōen - Mizuochi - Shinmei - Tobanaka

=== Highway ===
- Hokuriku Expressway
- National Route 8
- National Route 417

== Local attractions ==
- Kabutoyama Kofun, A National Historic Site
- ruins of Mitsumine Castle are located within the city.
- Nishiyama Park (West Mountain Park) is particularly beautiful in springtime, when hundreds of azaleas trees bloom on the slopes.
- Nishiyama Zoo is inside the park.
- Ōzan Kofun Cluster, A National Historic Site
- Sabae Megane Museum
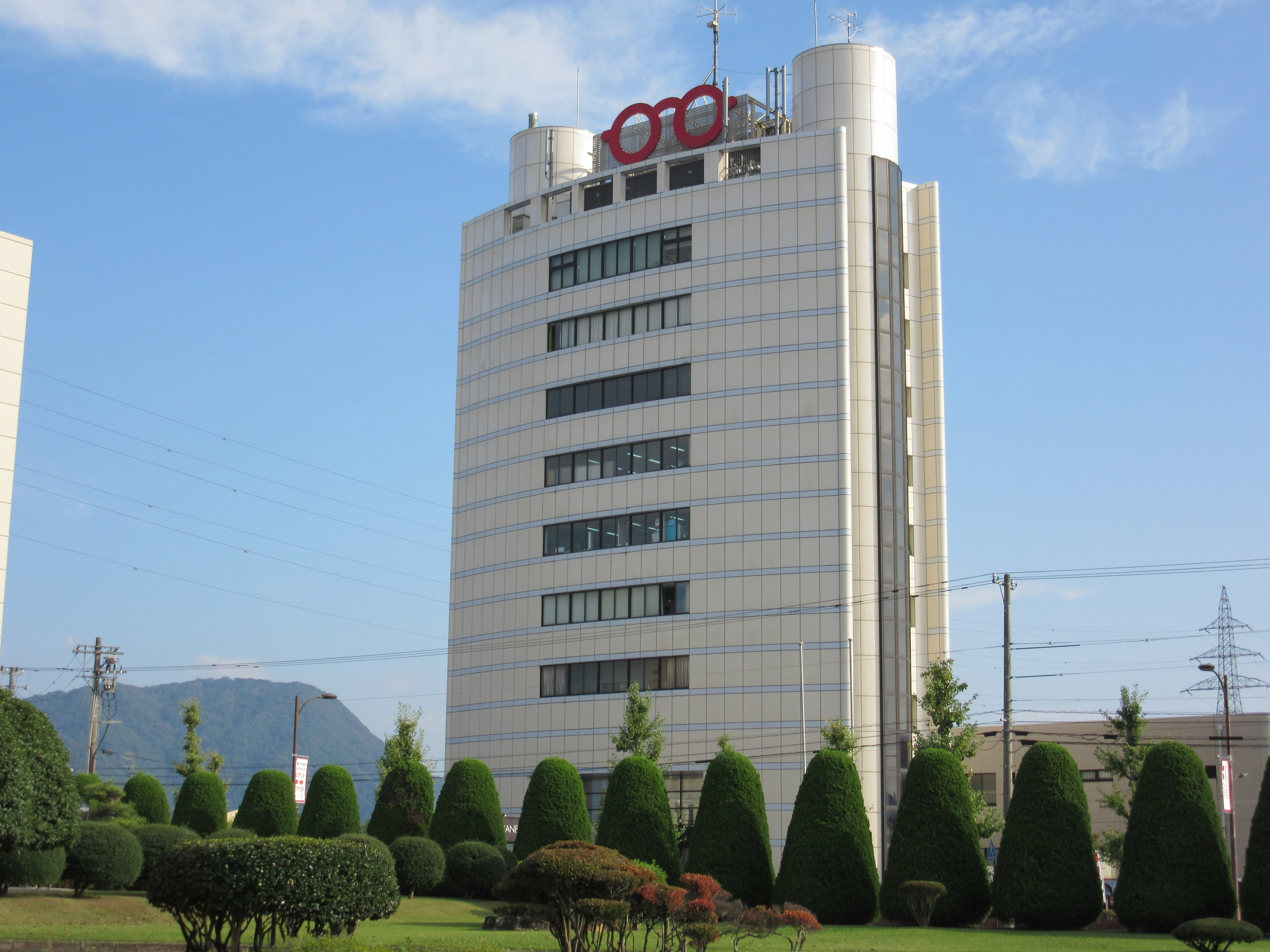
Megane Museum

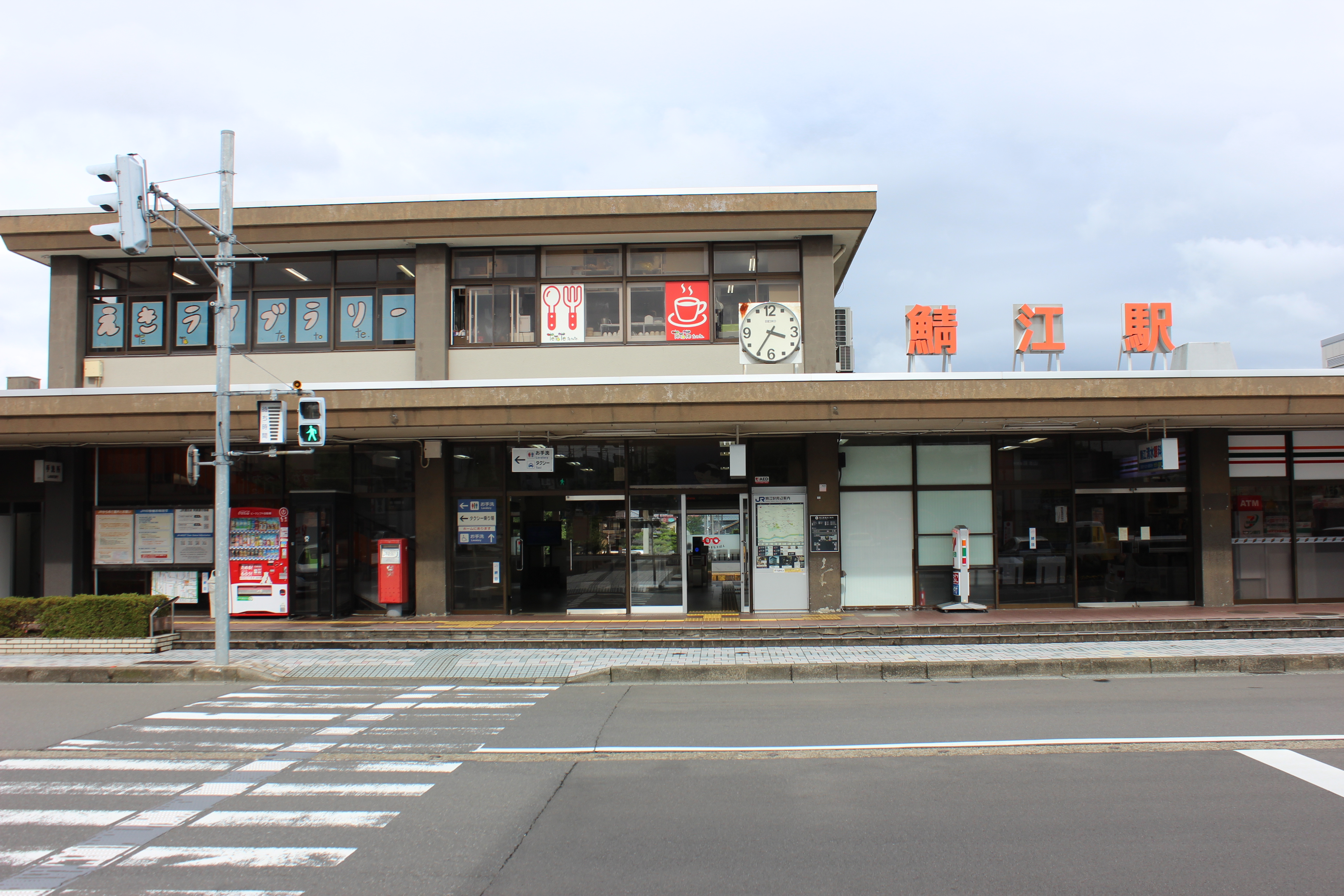
Sabae Station

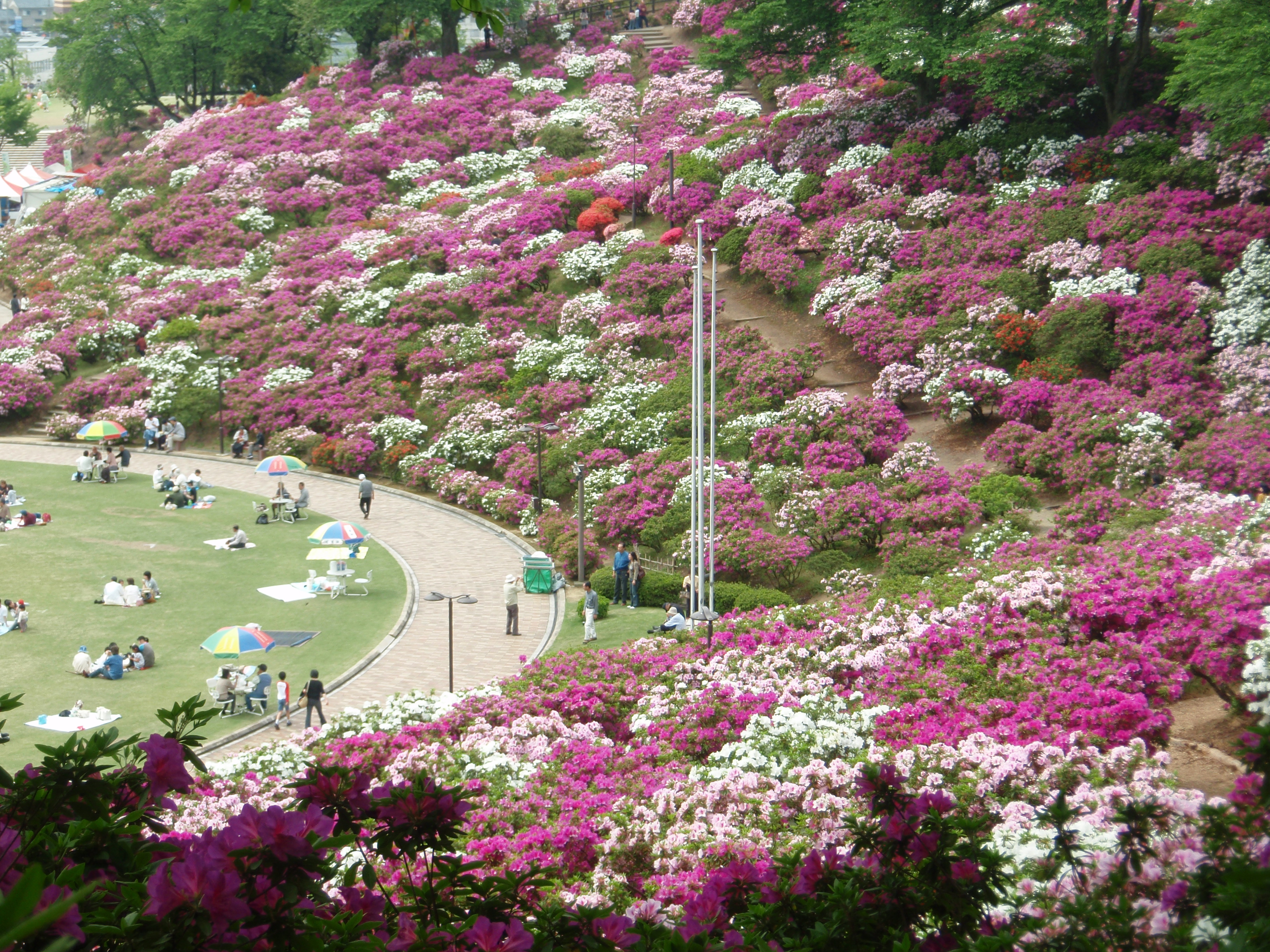
Nishiyama Park

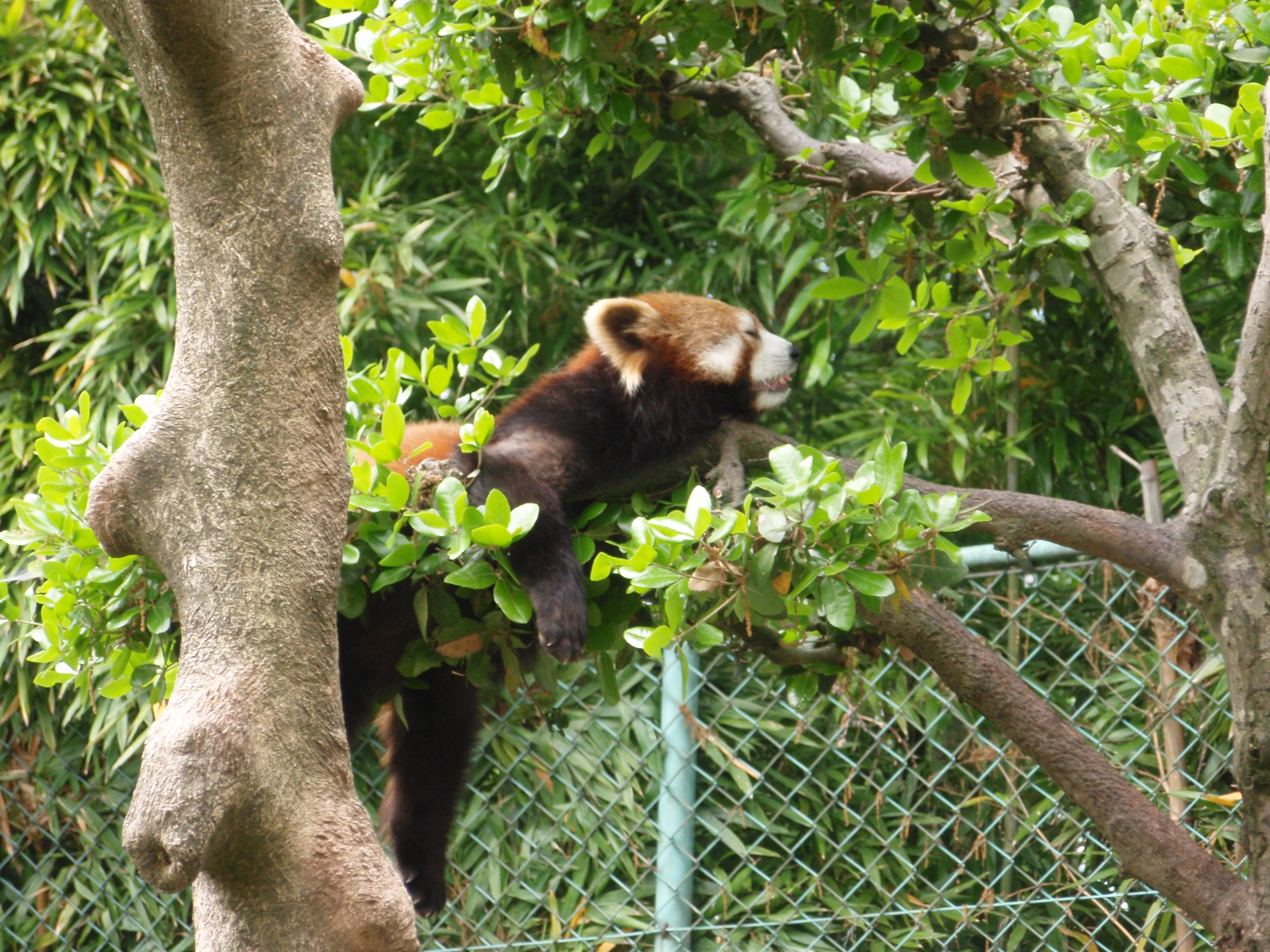
Red panda in Nishiyama Zoo

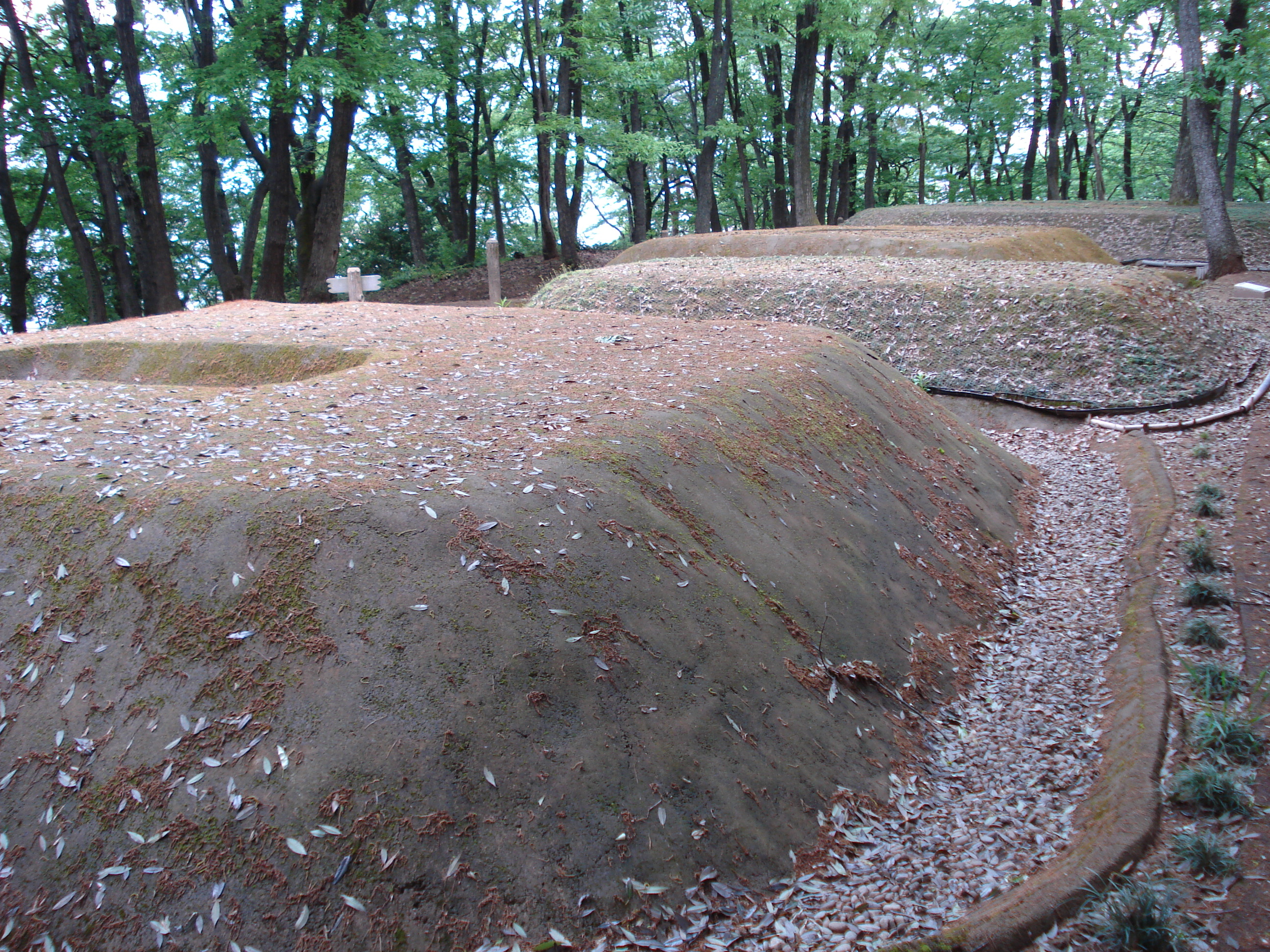
Ōzan Kofun Cluster
