= Fukui Railway Fukubu Line =

Tram system in Fukui prefecture, Japan

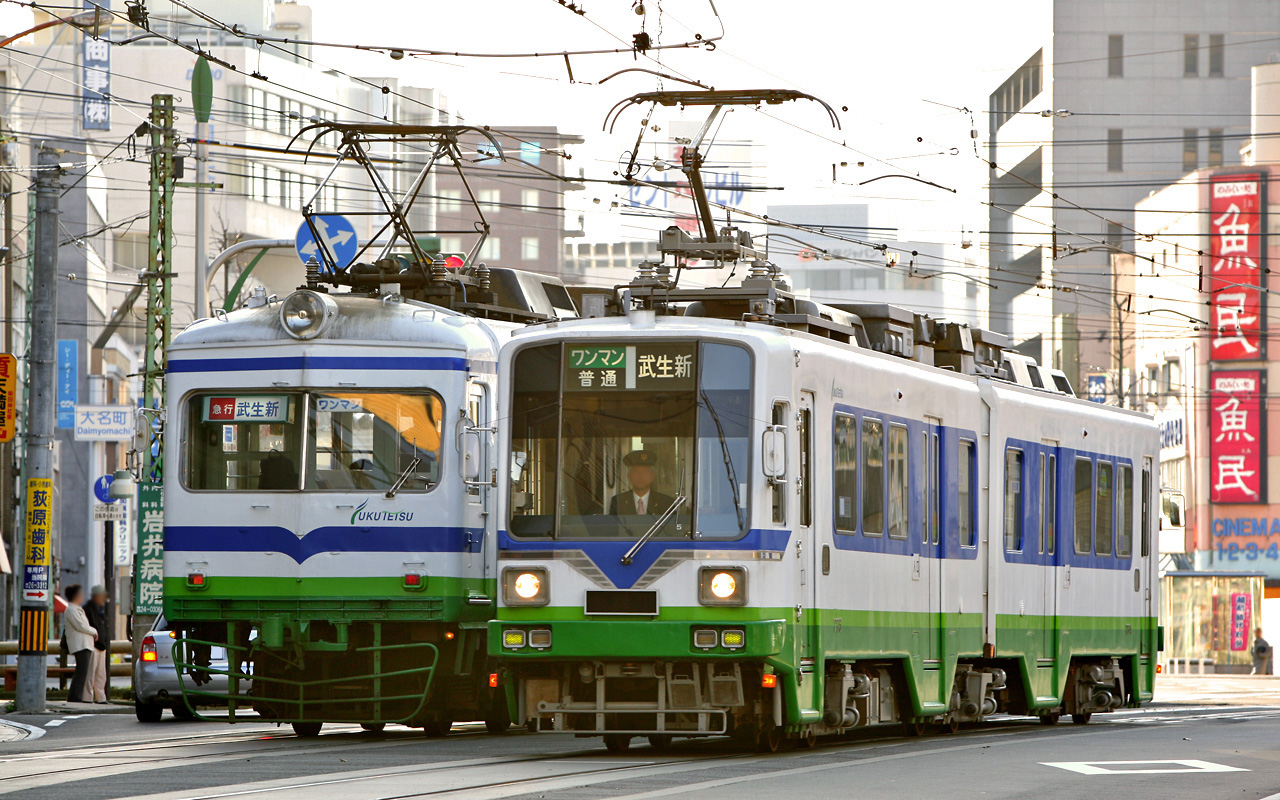
- Fukutetsu Series 200 (left) and Series 770 trains near Daimyōmachi intersection

Overview
- Owner: Fukui Railway
- Locale: Fukui Prefecture
- Termini: Takefu-shin; Fukui-Ekimae / Tawaramachi
- Stations: 23

Service
- Type: Heavy rail Light rail Interurban; Tram-train

History
- Opened: 1924

Technical
- Line length: 21.4 km (13.3 mi)
- Track gauge: 1,067 mm (3 ft 6 in)
- Electrification: 600 V DC, overhead catenary
- Operating speed: 65 km/h (40 mph); 40 km/h (25 mph) on street-running sections

The Fukui Railway Fukubu Line (福井鉄道福武線, Fukui Tetsudō Fukubu-sen) is a 21.4-kilometre (13.3 mi) railway line operated by Fukui Railway in Fukui Prefecture. The line runs from Takefu-shin Station in Echizen to Tawaramachi and Fukui-Ekimae stations in Fukui. Although it has its own right-of-way for most of the route, the Fukubu Line runs with traffic as a tram line past Sekijūjimae Station.

== History ==
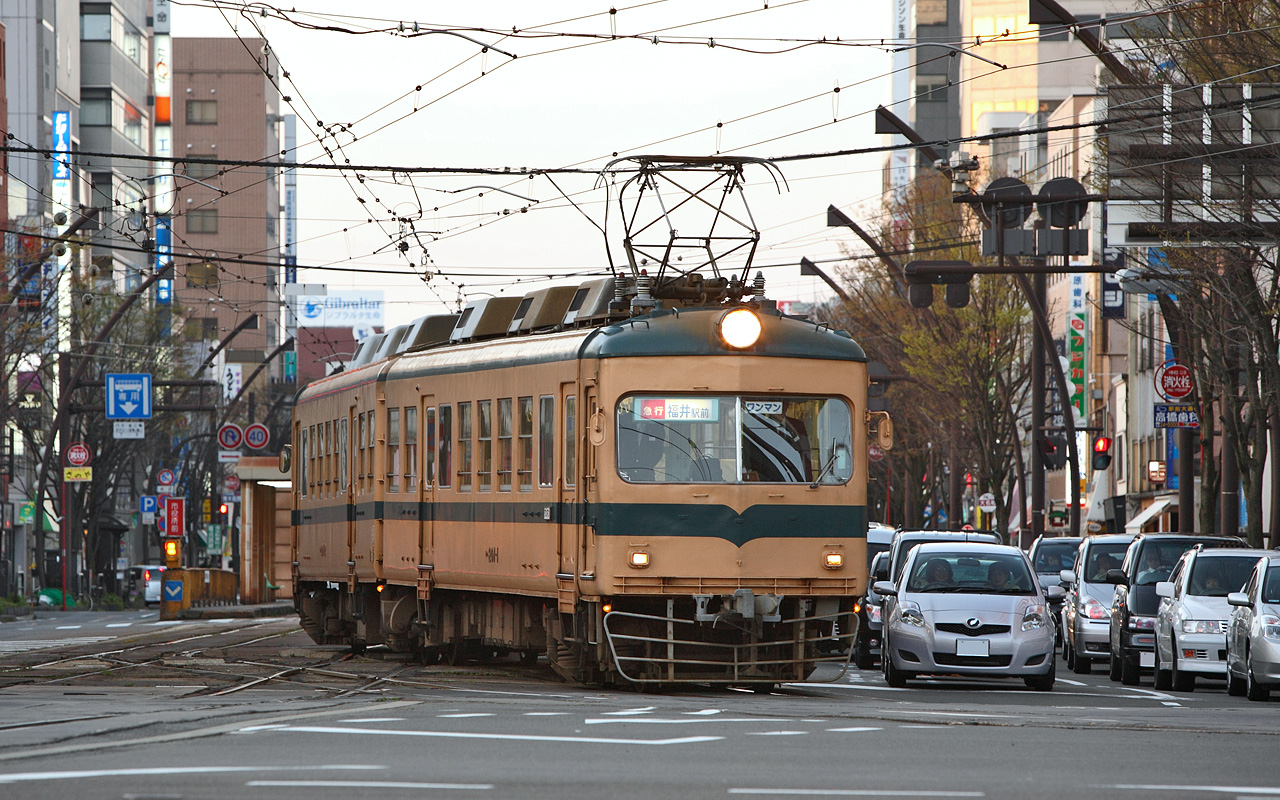
Fukui Railway 200 series train original livery.

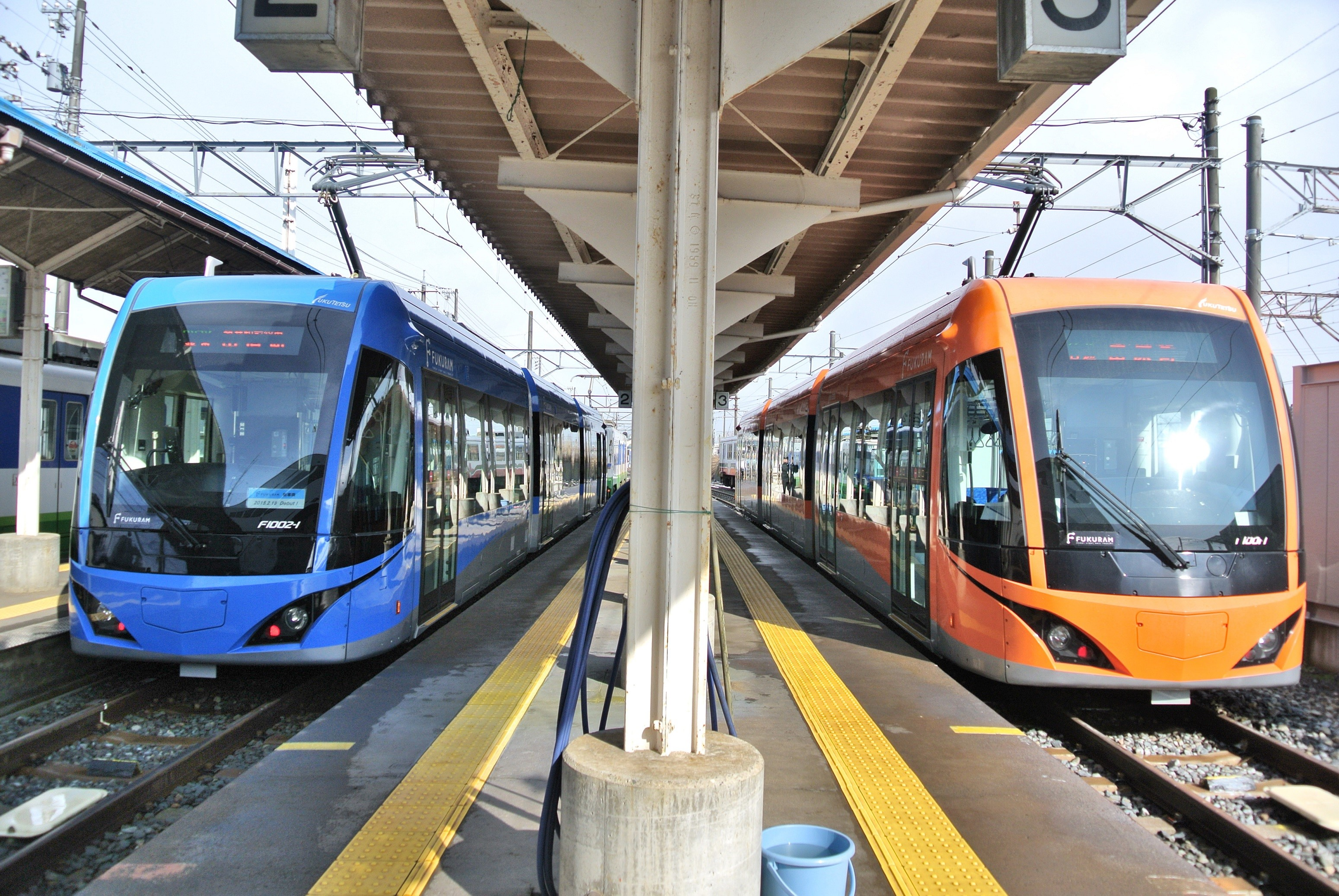
Fukui Railway F1000 low-floor vehicles at Takefu

The Fukubu Electric Railway (福武電気鉄道, Fukubu Denki Tetsudō) opened the Fukubu Line on 23 February 1924 for the purposes of transporting soldiers of the Imperial Japanese Army Sabae 36th Regiment between Takefu-shin and Heiei (兵営) (now Shinmei) stations.

- 23 February 1924: Fukubu Electric Railway opens the Fukubu Line between Takefu-Shin and Heiei (now Shinmei).
- 26 July 1925: Heiei – Fukui-Shin (now Sekijūjimae) section opens.
- 5 June 1927: Sanjūhassha Station opens.
- 5 October 1927: Mizuochi Station opens; former transfer station for the Seiho Electric Railway.
- 13 August 1929: Kami-Sabae (now Sundome Nishi), Shimo-Sabae (now Nishiyama-Kōen) stations open.
- 15 October 1933: Fukui-Shin – Fukui-Ekimae section opens.
- 1 October 1935: Tobanaka Station opens; Nishi-Tobanaka Station (between Heiei and Tobanaka) closes.
- April 1939: Heiei Station is renamed Chūō Station.
- 1 April 1941: Express service begins.
- 1 August 1945: Fukubu Electric Railway merges with Seiho Electric Railway to form Fukui Railway.
- June 1946: Chūō Station renamed Shinmei Station.
- 12 July 1950: Hanandō – Fukui-Shin section double-tracked.
- 27 November 1950: Honmachi-dōri — Fukui-Shin section opens. Daimyōmachi Station is renamed Honmachi-dōri Station.
- 1 April 1962: Keyamachi Station moved and renamed Kōenguchi Station. Fujishima-Jinja-mae Station (between Kidayotsutsuji and Kōenguchi) closes.
- 11 December 1964: Matsumoto-dōri Station (between Saibanshomae and Tawaramachi) closes. Saibanshomae Station moved towards Tawaramachi.
- 1 September 1969: Service between Hanandō, Fukui-Ekimae, and Tawaramachi abolished; all trains run through to Takefu-Shin Station.
- 2 October 1979: Freight services discontinued.
- 10 April 1980: Centralized traffic control (CTC) introduced.
- 1 August 1985: Driver-only operation introduced on morning and evening services.
- 10 April 1987: Shimo-Sabae Station renamed Nishiyama-Kōen Station.
- 1 October 1989: Hanandō-Minami Station opens.
- 20 January 1993: All trains equipped with ATS.
- 15 April 1993: Hanandō-Minami Station renamed Bell-mae Station.
- 20 September 1997: Harmony Hall Station opens.
- 30 November 1998: Daytime service interval changed to 20 minutes.
- 15 July 2002: Honmachi-dōri Station (between Kōenguchi and Shiyakushomae) closed.
- 1 December 2003: Part of Shiyakushomae — Fukui-Ekimae section single-tracked due to construction around Fukui Station.
- 30 September 2004: Semi-express service abolished.
- January–March 2006: All station platforms modified to serve low-floor vehicles.
- 1 April 2006: Low-floor trains enter service. Last departure time brought forward 30 minutes.
- 16 December 2007: Daytime shuttle trains begin service between Fukui-Ekimae and Tawaramachi.

On March 25, 2010, Sports-Kōen Station was established between the Nishi-Takefu and Iehisa stations. At the same time, five stations were renamed: Takefu-Shin to Echizen-Takefu; Nishi-Takefu to Kitago; Kami-Sabae to Sundome-Nishi; Fukui-Shin to Sekijūjimae; and Saibanshomae to Jin'ai-Joshikōkō.

== Station list ==
- All stations are located in Fukui Prefecture.
- Express (急行) trains stop at stations marked "●", pass those marked "|", and only a few stop at those marked "○". Most local trains stop at all stations but some pass those marked "○".
- Staff:
  - ◎ - Present all day
  - ○ - Present except early mornings and late nights
  - ◇ - Present during peak hours only
  - △ - Present during holidays only
  - × - Unstaffed
  - ※ - Present during events only

Station No.	Station	Japanese	Distance (km)		Express	Staff	Transfers	Location
Station No.	Station	Japanese	Between Stations	Total	Express	Staff	Transfers	Location
F0	Takefu-shin	たけふ新	-	0.0	●	◎	Hapi-Line Fukui : Hapi-Line Fukui Line (Takefu)	Echizen
F1	Kitago	北府	0.6	0.6	●	×		Echizen
F2	Sports Kōen	スポーツ公園	1.1	1.7	|	×		Echizen
F3	Iehisa	家久	0.7	2.4	●	×		Echizen
F4	Sundome Nishi	サンドーム西	1.7	4.1	|	×		Sabae
F5	Nishi-Sabae	西鯖江	1.2	5.3	●	○		Sabae
F6	Nishiyama-Kōen	西山公園	0.7	6.0	|	※		Sabae
F7	Mizuochi	水落	1.3	7.3	●	×		Sabae
F8	Shinmei	神明	1.2	8.5	●	○		Sabae
F9	Tobanaka	鳥羽中	1.2	9.7	|	×		Sabae
F10	Sanjūhassha	三十八社	1.2	10.9	|	×		Fukui
F11	Taichō no Sato	泰澄の里	1.3	12.2	|	×		Fukui
F12	Asōzu	浅水	0.8	13.0	●	○		Fukui
F13	Harmony Hall	ハーモニーホール	0.8	13.8	|	×		Fukui
F14	Seimei	清明	1.1	14.9	|	×		Fukui
F15	Ebata	江端	0.6	15.5	|	×		Fukui
F16	Bell-mae	ベル前	0.6	16.1	●	△		Fukui
F17	Hanandō	花堂	0.8	16.9	|	×		Fukui
F18	Sekijūjimae	赤十字前	0.9	17.8	●	○		Fukui
F19	Shokokaigishomae	商工会議所前	0.6	18.4	○	×		Fukui
F20	Asuwayamakoenguchi	足羽山公園口	0.5	18.9	○	×		Fukui
F21	Fukui Castle Ruins-daimyomachi	福井城址大名町	0.7	19.6	●	◇		Fukui
F22	Fukui-eki	福井駅	0.5	20.1	○	×	JR West: Hokuriku Main Line (Fukui); Echizen Railway: Katsuyama Eiheiji Line (Fukui)	Fukui
F23	Jin'ai Joshikōkō	仁愛女子高校	0.6*	20.2	●	×		Fukui
F24	Tawaramachi	田原町	0.7	20.9	●	×	Echizen Railway: Mikuni Awara Line (Some through to Washizuka-Haribara)	Fukui

- Note that distances for Jin'ai Joshikōkō and Tawaramachi Stations are measured from Shiyakushomae Station.
