= Takefu-shin Station =

Railway station in Japan

Takefu-shin Station たけふ新駅
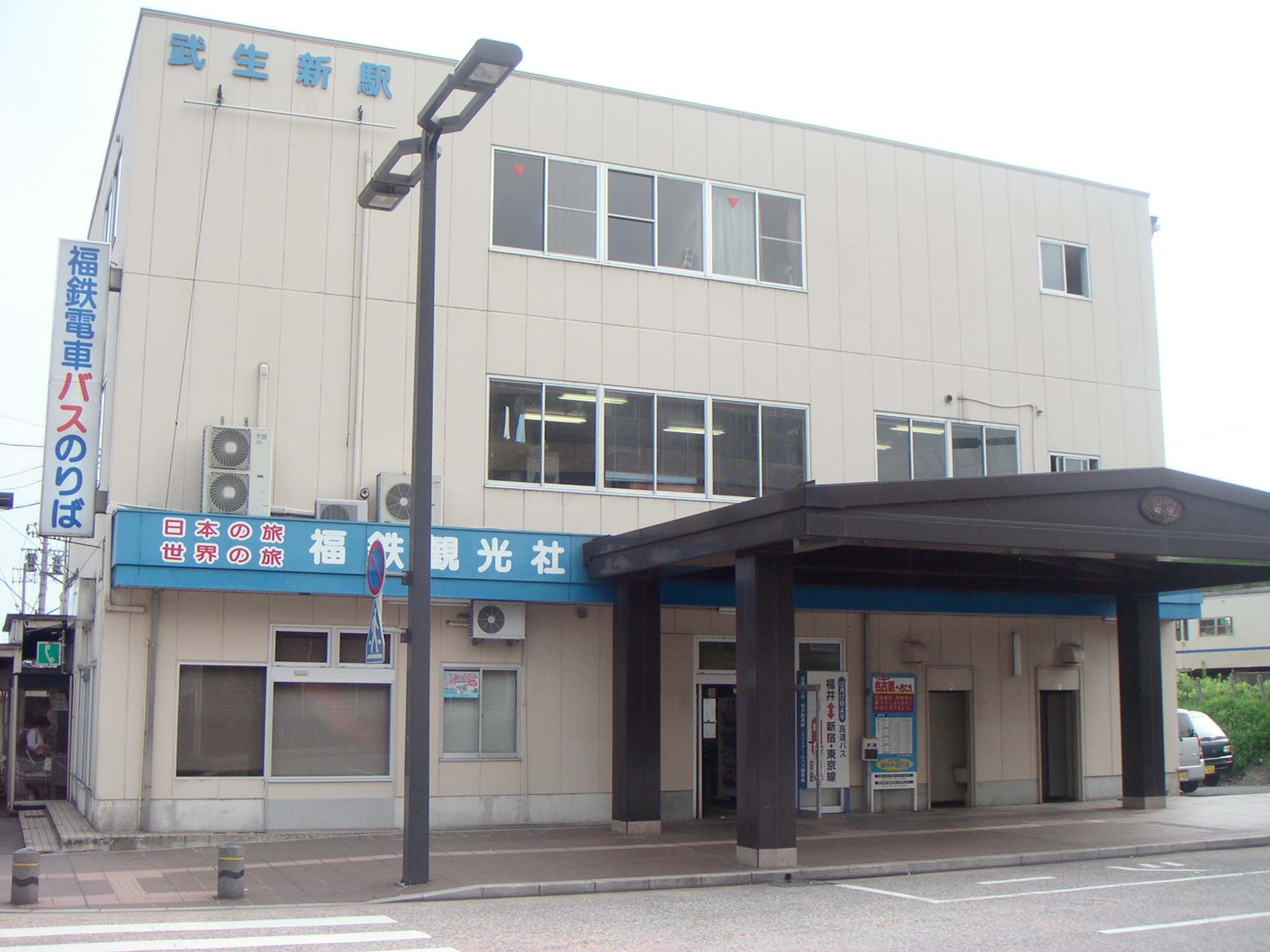
- Station building

General information
- Location: 3 Fuchū, Echizen-shi, Fukui-ken 915-0071; Japan
- Coordinates: 35°54′22″N 136°10′13″E
- Operator: Fukui Railway
- Line: ■ Fukubu Line
- Distance: 20.9 km from Tawaramachi
- Platforms: 2 bay platforms
- Tracks: 3
- Connections: Bus terminal

Other information
- Status: Staffed
- Station code: F0
- Website: Official website

History
- Opened: February 2, 1924
- Former names: Takefu-Shin (until 2010); Echizen-Takefu (until 2023)
Location
- Location within Japan

Takefu-shin Station (たけふ新駅, Takefushin-eki) is a Fukui Railway Fukubu Line railway station located in the city of Echizen, Fukui Prefecture, Japan.

== Lines ==
Takefu-shin Station is the terminal station of the Fukui Railway Fukubu Line, and is located 20.9 kilometers from the terminus of the line at Tawaramachi. There are several bus lines operating from a rotary near the south exit and stops by the west exit.

== Station layout ==
The station consists of two bay platforms serving three tracks, with a three-story station building. The station is staffed.

== Adjacent stations ==
«	Service	»
Fukui Railway Fukubu Line
Terminus	Special Limited Express	Shinmei
Terminus	Limited Express	Kitago
Terminus	Local	Kitago

== History ==
The station opened on February 2, 1924, as Takefu-Shin Station (武生新駅, Takefu-Shin-eki). A new station building was completed in 1983. The station was renamed to Echizen-Takefu Station (越前武生駅, Echizen-Takefu-eki) on March 25, 2010

With the opening of the Hokuriku Shinkansen extension to Tsuruga, it was decided that one of the new Shinkansen stations would be given the name 'Echizen-Takefu Station'. As the station name is also being used by Fukui Railways, a poll was conducted to choose a new name for this station. Besides the reverting the station name back to 'Takefu-Shin Station', the 5 other suggests were 'Fukutetsu-Takefu Station', 'Fukutetsu-Echizen Station', 'Kikuka-Takefu Station', and 'Echizen-Fuchu Station'. The results of the poll was to rename this station to Takefu-shin Station with 'Takefu' being written in hiragana rather than kanji. This came into effect on February 25, 2023.

== Surrounding area ==
- Various government facilities including Echizen City Hall and municipal library are nearby.
- The AL.PLAZA supermarket is just outside the station's front entrance.
- Takefu Station on the JR West Hokuriku Main Line is located 250 meters to the south.
- Echizen-Takefu Station on the JR West Hokuriku Shinkansen is located 5 km to the east.

== See also ==
- List of railway stations in Japan
