= Fukui Railway =

Bus & railway company in Fukui Prefecture, Japan

Fukui Railway Co., Ltd. 福井鉄道株式会社

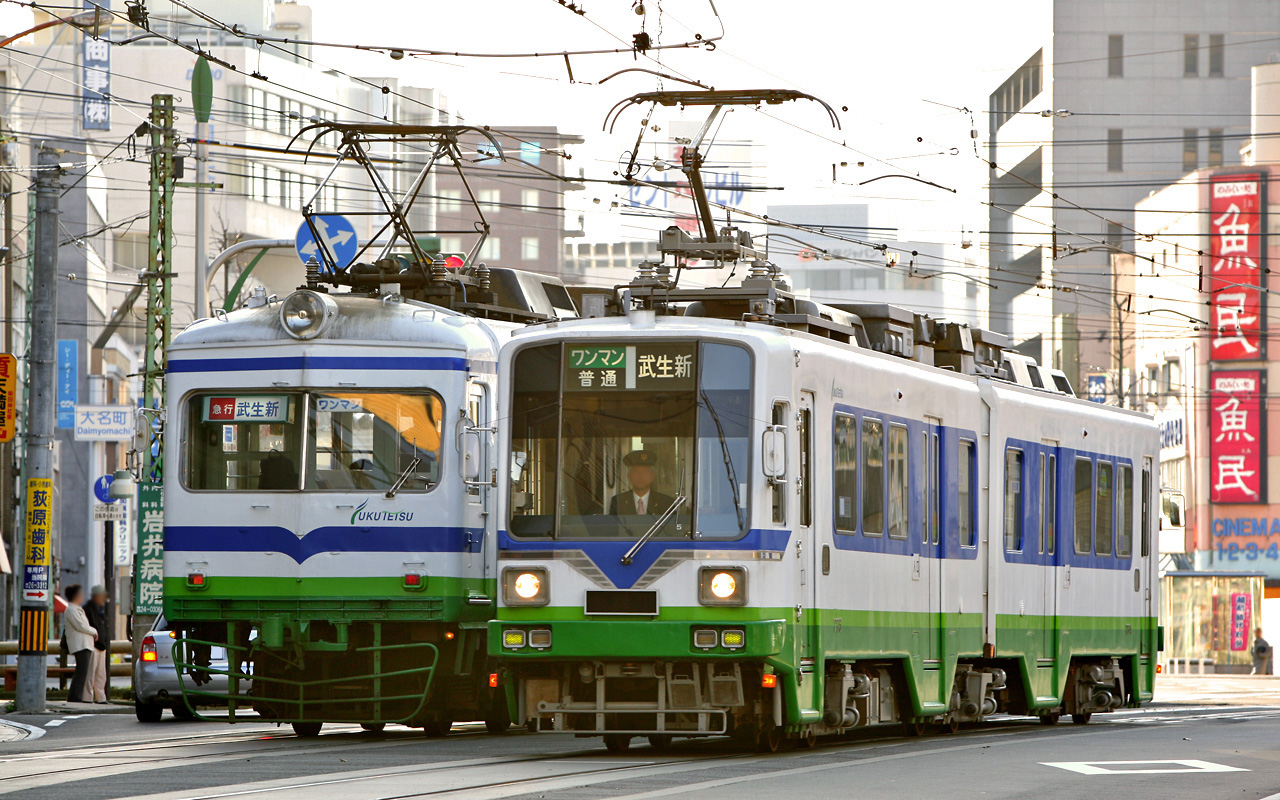
- Fukutetsu 200 series (left) and 770 series EMUs
- Type: Corporation
- Industry: Bus, taxi, rail transport, Tram-train
- Predecessor: Fukubu Electric Railway, Seiho Electric Railway
- Founded: August 1, 1945
- Headquarters: Echizen, Fukui Prefecture, Japan
- Area served: Northern Fukui Prefecture
- Key people: Haruo Murata, President
- Revenue: 2.255 billion yen (FY2008)
- Operating income: -126 million yen (FY2008)
- Net income: 109 million yen (FY2008)
- Total assets: 6.9 billion yen (FY2008)
- Owner: Fukui Town Management Organization (6.8%); Sabae Chamber of Commerce and Industry (6.8%); Takefu Chamber of Commerce and Industry (5.4%); Fukui City Fukui Railway Fukubu Line Support Organization (4.1%); Sabae Citizen's Committee for the Promotion of Utilization of the Fukui Railway Fukubu Line (4.1%); Echizen City Fukubu Line Support Liaison Council (4.1%)
- Number of employees: 236
- Subsidiaries: Fukuetsu Shōji, Rainbow Kankō Jidōsha, Fukutetsu Kankōsha, Takefu Taxi, Daiwa Kōtsū, Chūbu Jidōsha Kōgyō
- Website: fukutetsu.jp

Fukui Railway (福井鉄道株式会社, Fukui Tetsudō Kabushikigaisha) is a private railway and bus company located in Echizen, Fukui Prefecture, Japan. It owns and operates the Fukubu Line between Tawaramachi Station in Fukui and Takefu-shin Station in Echizen.

== Overview ==
Although Fukui Railway's name refers to its founding as a railway, 75.1% of the company's revenue comes from local and long-distance bus transport— only 16.7% is from its railway operation. Since 1963 the company's railway business has lost money, and although this loss was offset by its bus and real estate operations, by 2006 the company recorded a cumulative loss of 2.2 billion yen and debts of 3.07 billion yen.

As a result of these unsustainable losses, in August 2007 the company formally requested financial support from the cities of Echizen, Sabae, and Fukui. Negotiations with Fukui Prefecture, Nagoya Railroad (the company's parent), Fukui Bank and other financial institutions proved difficult. However, on December 29, 2008, Nagoya Railroad agreed to acquire one share in Fukui Railway for one billion yen then divest all shares (246,899 shares in total), including the one additional share created, in the company to Fukui Town Management Organization (a third sector company established by municipalities) and local support organizations for one yen per share, ending its 45-year ownership of the company.

During an extraordinary shareholders meeting on November 25, 2008, Haruo Murata, formerly of Fukui Bank, was selected as the company's new president. On February 24, 2009, the Ministry of Land, Infrastructure, Transport and Tourism officially approved the "Railway Business Restructuring Plan", which provides one billion yen over ten years for replacing equipment and facilities as well as reducing the company's fixed assets tax burden.

== Through service with Echizen Railway ==
On May 27, 2010, Fukui Prefecture announced plans for through services between Fukui Railway and Echizen Railway. Under the plan, beginning in 2013 the Fukui Railway's Fukubu Line would connect to the Echizen Railway at Tawaramachi Station, and as many as two trains per hour in each direction would run through to Nittazuka Station. The next stage would involve extending Fukui Railway service to Nishi-Nagata Station and running Echizen Railway trains onto the Fukubu Line. As a part of this plan, five stations would be renovated.

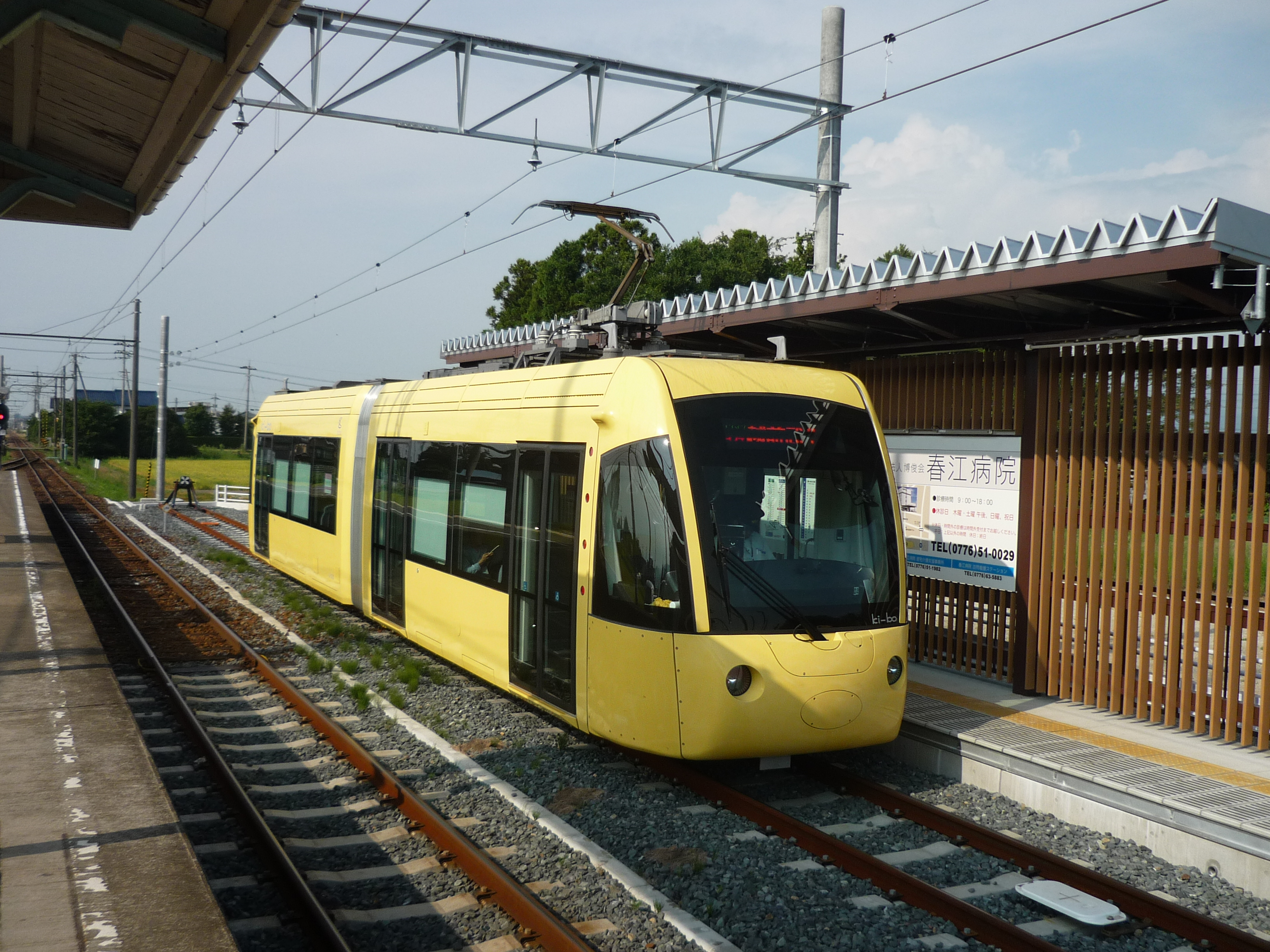
Echizen Railway L Series

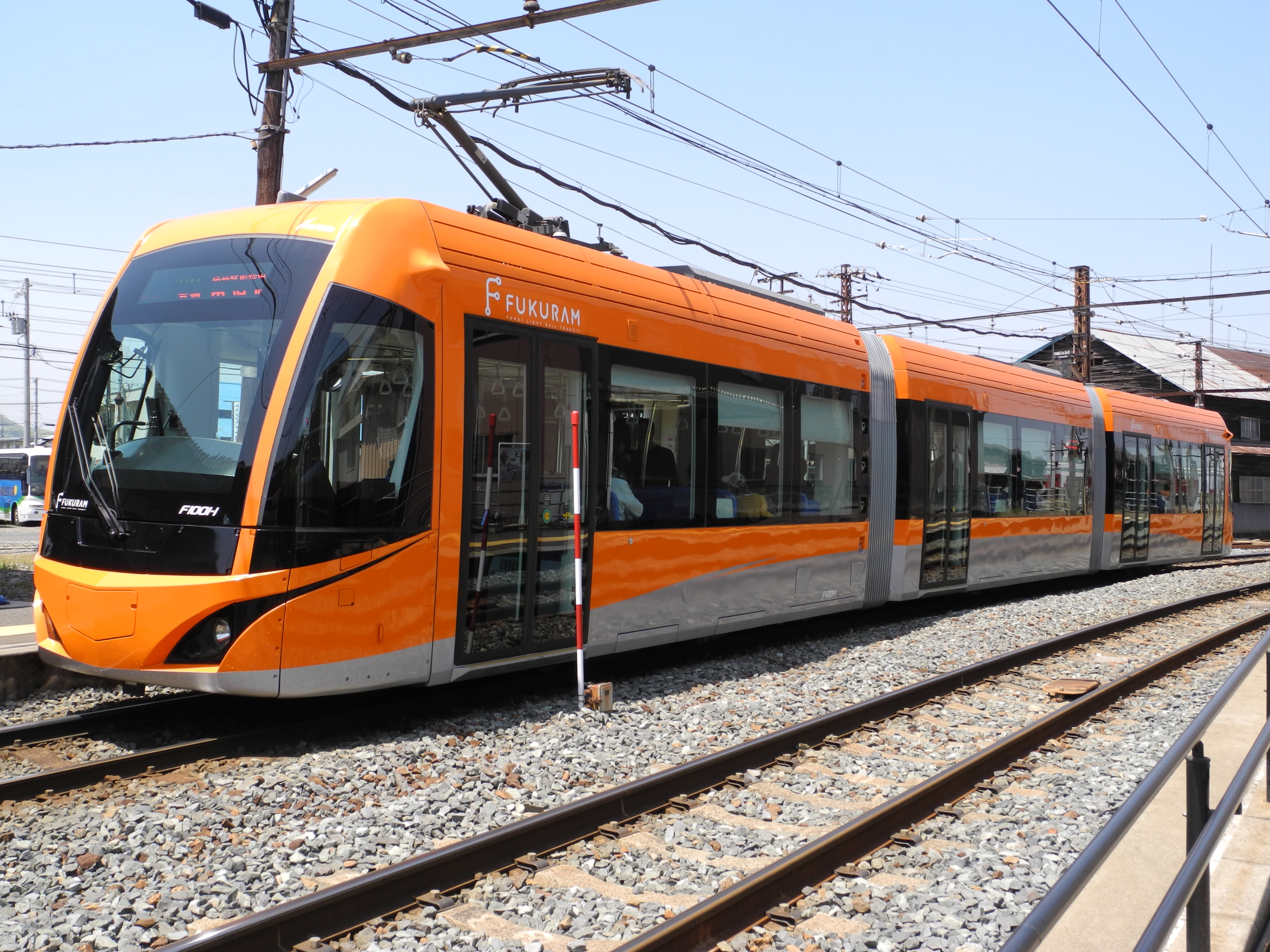
Fukui Railway F1000 Series LRVs

One issue regarding through service is that Echizen Railway train cars are 2.8 meters wide, wider than cars used by Fukui Railway. As a result, Echizen Railway trains on Fukubu Line double-tracked sections do not have the necessary 40 centimeter clearance, requiring Echizen Railway to acquire a new, 3-car set for through service use.

The cost of the project is estimated at several billion yen, and funding sources have not been specified. As it is unclear whether usage will increase from through running, participants in the prefecture's study group worry that costs will outpace any increase in revenue.

In March 2016 through operation started between Echizen and Fukui Railways started using Echizen L series and Fukui F1000 series low floor LRVs that are compatible with both networks, becoming Japan's first modern tram-train system.

As at July 2024, the current timetable for the through service is an hourly service between approximately 10am and 6pm, 7 days per week, from Takefu-Shin to Washizuka-Haribara and return. It operates as a local service, serving all stations and diverting via Fukui-Ekimae in both directions (services do not stop at Nakatsuno on the Mikuni Awara Line because there is no low-floor platform at this station). In addition there are two morning local trips from Takefu-Shin arriving at Tawaramarchi around 8am which continue one stop onto the Mikuni Awara Line to terminate at Fukudai-mae Nishi-Fukui then return as a local service to Takefu-Shin - these trips do not divert via Fukui-Ekimae in either direction.

== History ==
- August 1, 1945: Fukubu Electric Railway merges with Seiho Electric Railway to form Fukui Railway.
- August 1948: Fukui Railway acquires Chūbu Noriai Jidōsha.
- December 1953: Fukui Railway acquires Tsuruga Noriai.
- September 1960: Fukui Railway acquires Mikata Kōtsū.
- September 1963: 33.36% of Fukui Railway acquired by Nagoya Railway (Meitetsu Group).
- September 29, 1973: Seiho Line abolished.
- April 1, 1981: Nan'etsu Line abolished.
- July 20, 1988: Highway bus service between Fukui and Nagoya begins.
- December 1988: Bus location system introduced.
- May 2, 1989: Overnight highway bus service between Fukui and Tokyo begins.
- October 1990: Highway bus service between Fukui and Namba, Osaka begins.
- April 1993: Highway bus service between Fukui and Namba, Osaka halted.
- September 2003: Highway bus service between Obama and Osaka begins.
- November 1, 2006: Daytime highway bus service between Fukui and Tokyo begins.
- December 22, 2007: Daytime highway bus service between Fukui and Osaka (Umeda) begins.
- December 29, 2008: Nagoya Railroad transfers its 33.36% share of Fukui Railway to local municipalities, ending all capital ties with the company.
- February 24, 2009: The company's "Railway Business Restructuring Plan" is approved by the central government, paving the way for financial assistance from municipalities and the national government.
- March 2016: Through train service between Echizen Railway.
- February 25, 2023: The station name for the southern terminus of the Fukubu Line was changed from Echizen-Takefu to Takefu-Shin, due to the name "Echizen-Takefu" being used for the new nearby station on the Hokuriku Shinkansen extension to Tsuruga.
