= N8 =

N8 may refer to:

- N postcode area district of north London
- Number Eight (disambiguation)
- Nokia N8, 2010 smartphone model
- N8 (Long Island bus), bus route in Nassau County, New York
- N8 Group of research-intensive universities in northern England
- National Airlines (N8), a cargo airline in United States, which its IATA code is N8
- N_{8}, the molecular formula of octaazacubane
- N_{8}, the molecular formula of a high pressure nitrogen form
- List of N8 roads
- LNER Class N8, a class of British steam locomotives
- Denza N8, an SUV by BYD Auto

== See also ==
- N08, FAA identifier for Flanagan Field Airport in North Carolina
- 8N (disambiguation)
