= SR8 =

SR8 may refer to:

- Radical SR8
- Radical Sportscars
- Small nucleolar RNA sR8

== See also ==
- List of highways numbered 8
