= SH8 =

SH8 may refer to:

== India ==
- State Highway 8 (Karnataka)
- State Highway 8 (Kerala) or Main Eastern Highway
- State Highway 8 (Madhya Pradesh)
- State Highway 8 (West Bengal)
- SH 8, a state highway in Bihar

== New Zealand ==
- State Highway 8 (New Zealand)

== United States ==
- Colorado State Highway 8
- Idaho State Highway 8
- Oklahoma State Highway 8
- Texas State Highway 8

== See also ==
- List of highways numbered 8
