= Sekijūjimae Station =

Railway station in Fukui, Japan

Sekijūjimae Station 赤十字前駅
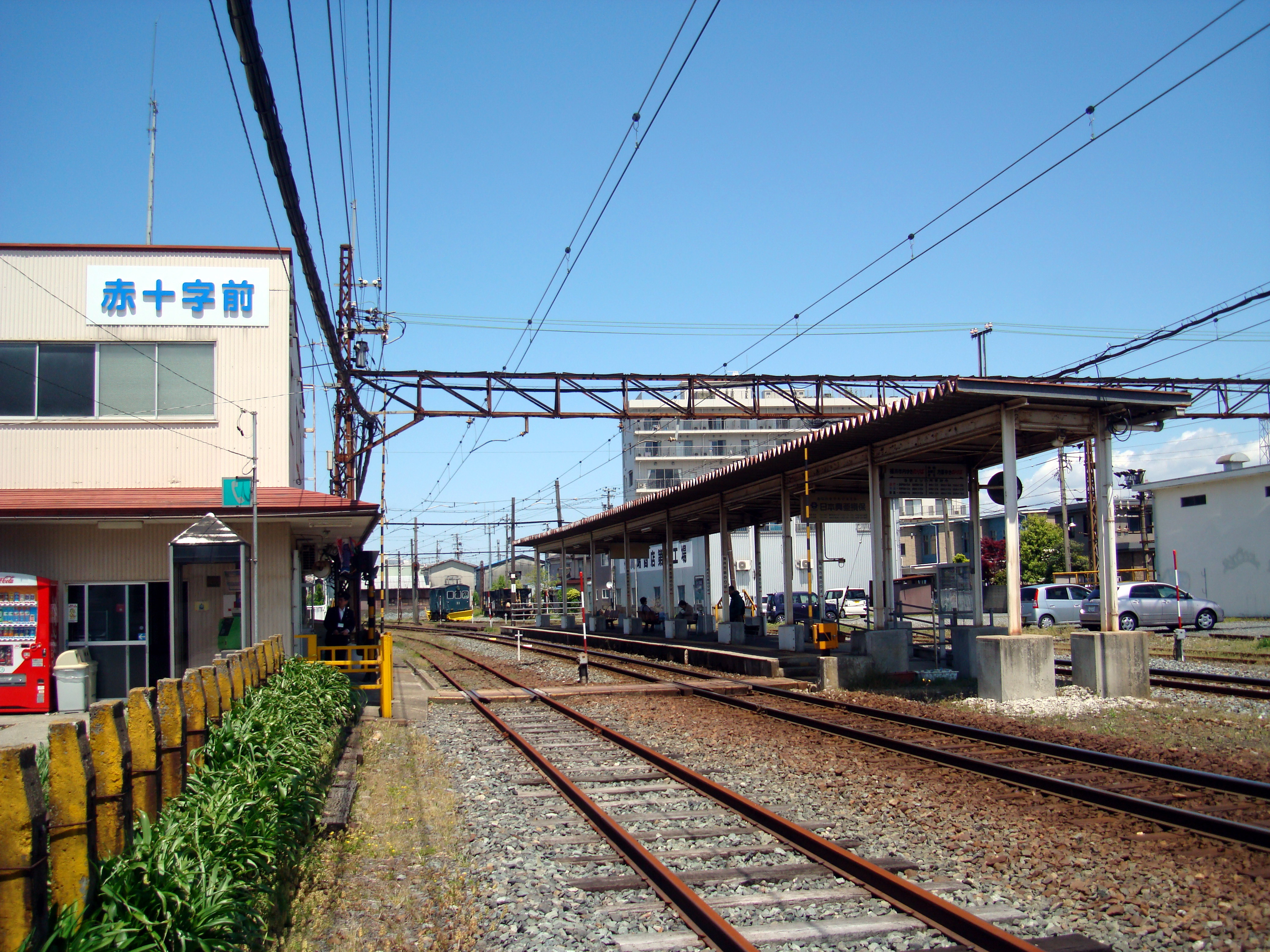
- Sekijūjimae Station platforms, 2013

General information
- Location: 1-14-21 Minori, Fukui-shi, Fukui-ken 918-8005; Japan
- Coordinates: 36°02′55″N 136°13′00″E
- Operator: Fukui Railway
- Line: ■ Fukubu Line
- Distance: 17.8 km from Takefu-shin
- Platforms: 1 island platform
- Tracks: 2
- Connections: Bus stop

Other information
- Status: Staffed
- Station code: F18
- Website: Official website

History
- Opened: July 26, 1925
- Former names: Fukui-Shi (to 1933), Fukui-Shin (until 2010)
Location
- Location within Japan

Sekijūjimae Station (赤十字前駅, Sekijūjimae-eki) is a Fukui Railway Fukubu Line railway station located in the city of Fukui, Fukui Prefecture, Japan.

== Lines ==
Sekijūjimae Station is served by the Fukui Railway Fukubu Line and is located 17.8 kilometers from the terminus of the line at Takefu-shin.

== Station layout ==
The station consists of one ground-level island platform connected to the two-story station building by a level crossing. The station is staffed between 7:10 and 19:30.

== Adjacent stations ==
«	Service	»
Fukui Railway Fukubu Line
Bell-mae	Express	Shokokaigisho-mae
Hanando	Local	Shokokaigisho-mae

== History ==
The station opened on July 26, 1925, as Fukui-Shi Station (福井市駅, Fukui-Shi-eki). It was relocated 400 meters to the south and renamed Fukui-Shin Station (福井新 on March 20, 1933, 駅, Fukui-Shin-eki). and was renamed to the present name on March 25, 2010.

== Surrounding area ==
- Long a suburb of Fukui, the area is mostly residential.
- To the east lies Minami-Fukui Freight Terminal on the Hokuriku Main Line, which is connected to Sekijūjimae Station by a tunnel.
- Other points of interest include:
  - Fukui Minori Post Office
  - Fukui Red Cross Hospital
  - Fukui Higashi School for the Disabled, Tsukimi Campus
  - Fukui Red Cross Blood Center
  - Fukui Municipal Minori Elementary School
  - Fukui Municipal Kida Elementary School
  - Fukui Municipal Meirin Junior High School

== See also ==
- List of railway stations in Japan
