= Denza N8 =

Mid-size and full-size crossover SUV

Denza X/N8
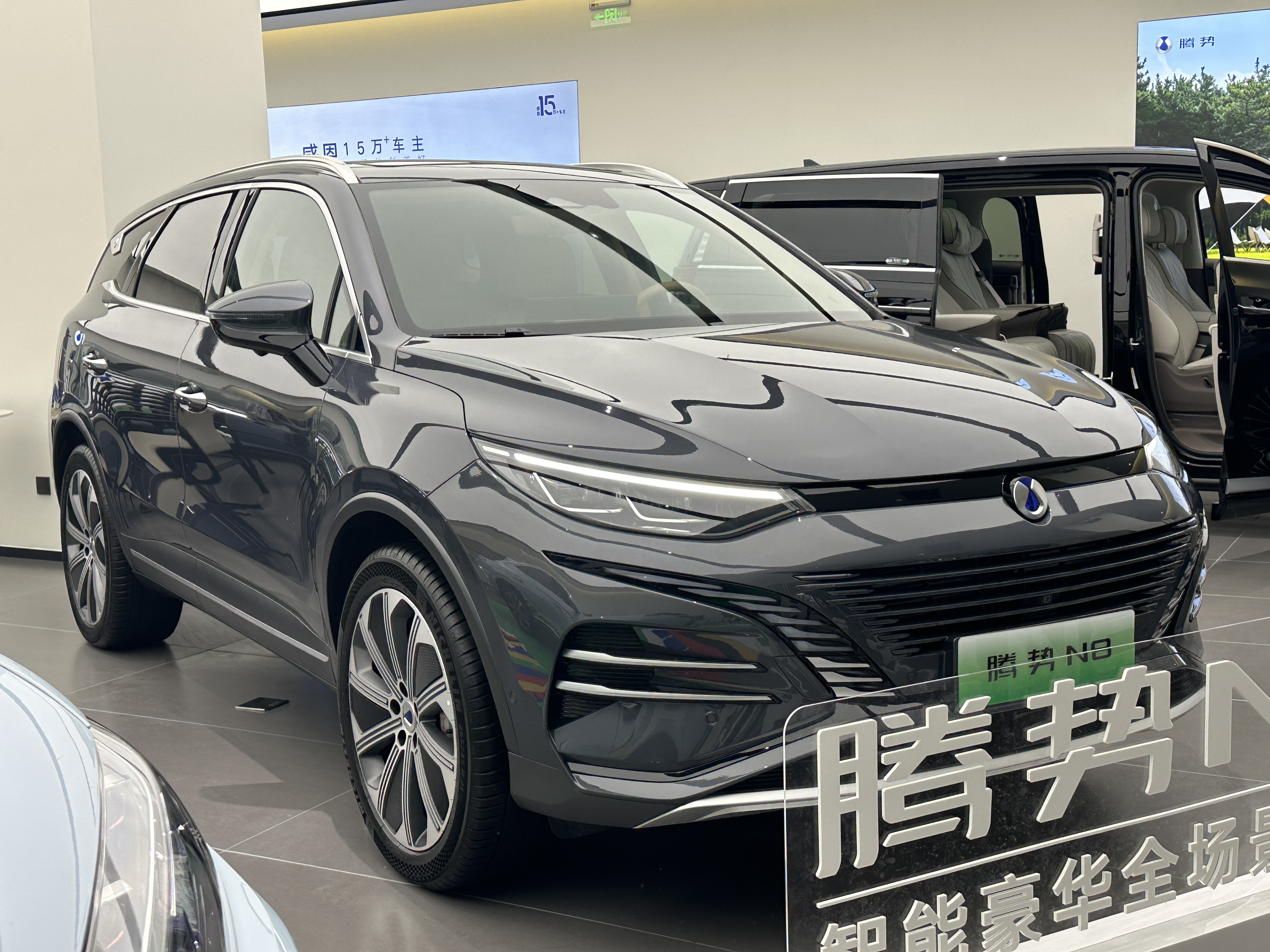

Overview
- Manufacturer: BYD Auto
- Production: 2019–2021 (X); 2023–2024; 2026–present

Body and chassis
- Class: Mid-size SUV (2019–2021, 2023–2024); Full-size SUV (2026–present)
- Body style: 5-door crossover SUV

The Denza N8 (Chinese: 腾势N8; pinyin: Téngshì N8) and the preceding Denza X are plug-in hybrid and battery electric mid-size and full-size SUV. The original Denza X was first launched in Guangzhou Auto Show 2019 by Denza, originally a joint venture between Chinese automaker BYD Auto and German luxury car brand Mercedes-Benz.

The Denza X was sold from 2019 to 2021 as a restyled second generation BYD Tang and after Mercedes-Benz withdrew from the joint venture, the Denza X was replaced by the Denza N8 as a major facelift. According to Denza, the "N" from the N8 means "New era of intelligence" and "unlimited driving control". In 2026, the second-generation N8 was revealed as a slightly smaller, 5-seater variant of the larger N8L.

== Denza X ==
Denza X
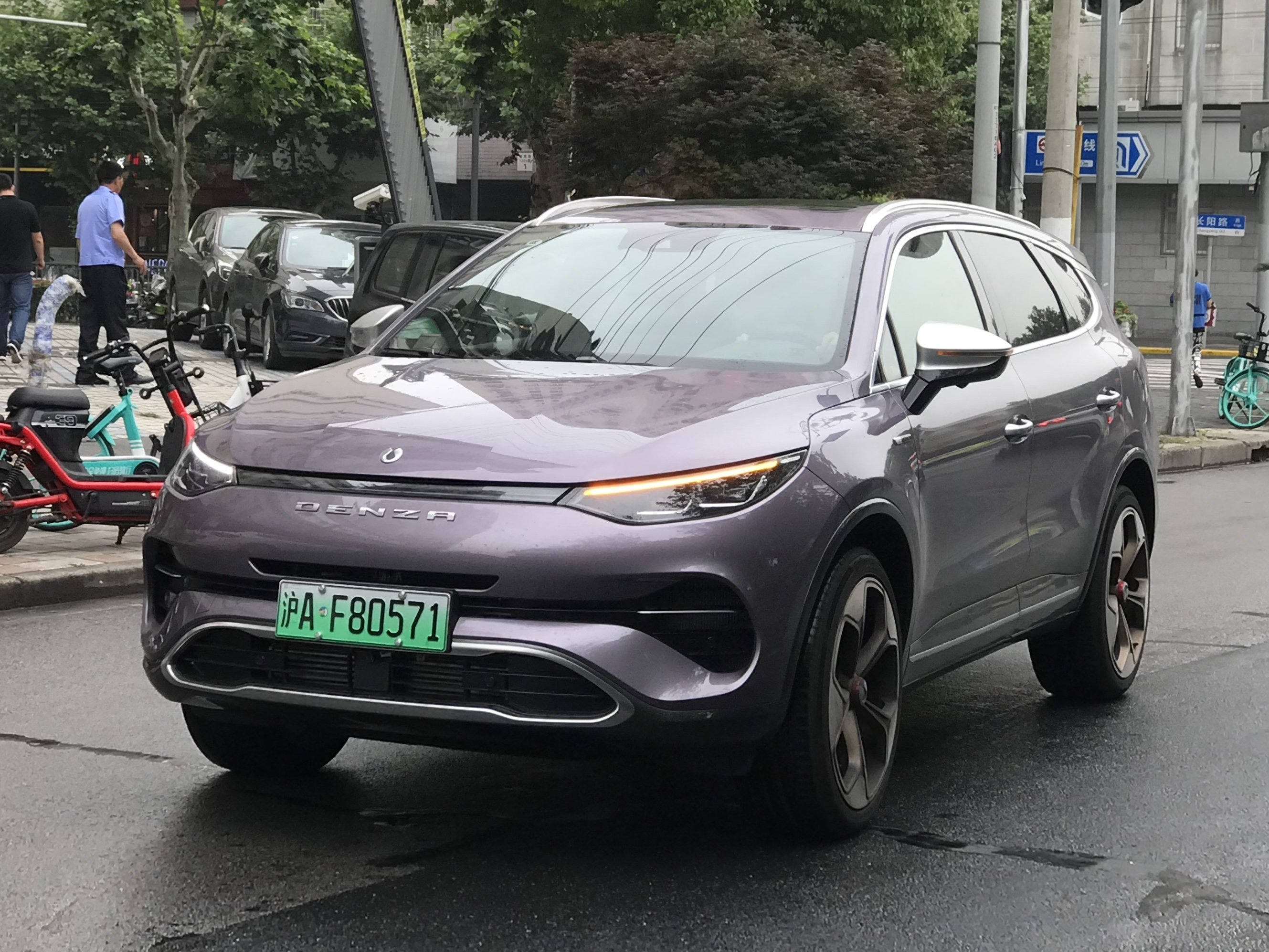

Overview
- Production: 2019–2021
- Assembly: China: Shenzhen, Guangdong

Body and chassis
- Layout: Front-engine, dual-motor, all-wheel drive; Dual-motor, four-wheel-drive
- Related: BYD Tang; BYD Frigate 07; BYD Sealion 07 DM

Powertrain
- Engine: 2.0 L BYD487ZQA I4 (turbo petrol) 431 kW (578 hp; 586 PS); Front electric motor AC permanent magnet synchronous motor 110 kW (148 hp; 150 PS); Rear electric motor AC permanent magnet synchronous motor 180 kW (241 hp; 245 PS)
- Transmission: 6-speed DCT
- Hybrid drivetrain: PHEV
- Battery: Lithium NCM batterypack
- Electric range: 80 km (50 mi) / 100 km (62 mi)

Dimensions
- Wheelbase: 2,820 mm (111.0 in)
- Length: 4,890 mm (192.5 in)
- Width: 1,950 mm (76.8 in)
- Height: 1,725 mm (67.9 in)
- Curb weight: 2,120–2,330 kg (4,674–5,137 lb)

The Denza X was originally introduced at the Guangzhou Auto Show as the Denza Concept X. The concept version is 7-seat crossover SUV based on the second generation BYD Tang. The Denza X was available from early 2020 in two versions including an all-electric variant and a plug-in hybrid version. The all-electric Denza X is set to have a range of 500 kilometres (311 mi) and acceleration from 0 to 100 km/h (0 to 62 mph) could be done in less than 5 seconds.

The production Denza X was launched in two versions just as planned, including an all-electric and a plug-in hybrid (PHEV). According to the plan, the PHEV version will cost 319,800 Chinese yuan and the all-electric one will cost 289,800 Chinese yuan when starting production and sales. It was announced that the designing was done by the Mercedes-Benz design team.

However, the car did not live up to the expectations placed in it, gaining little popularity and disappearing from the market after 2 years of production at the end of 2021.

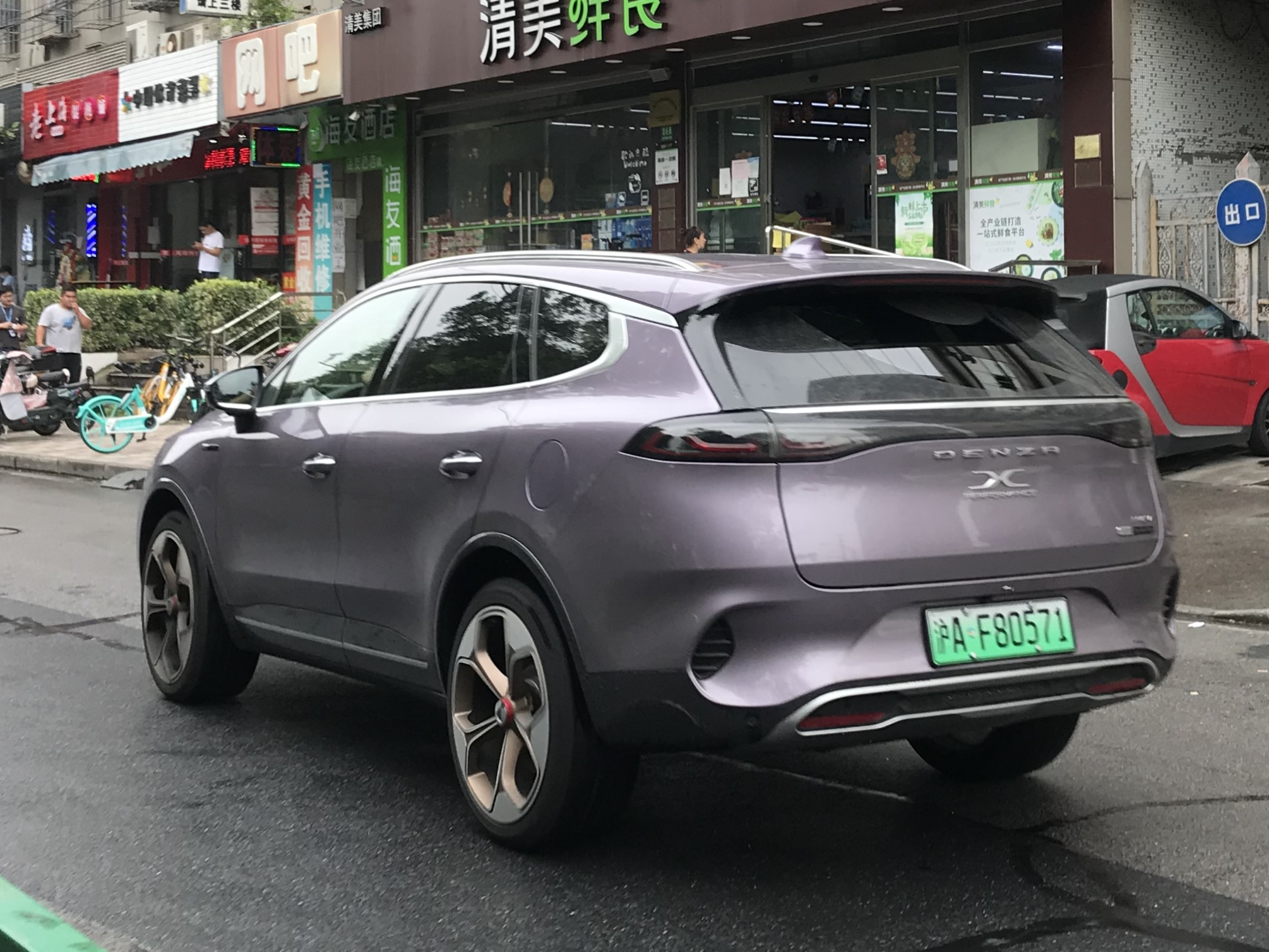
Rear view

== First generation (2023) ==
The first generation N8 is essentially a facelifted version of the Denza X, and was reintroduced as a five- to seven-seater large crossover SUV in 2023. The Denza N8 adopts the DM-p hybrid technology plus the e-platform 3.0 structure.

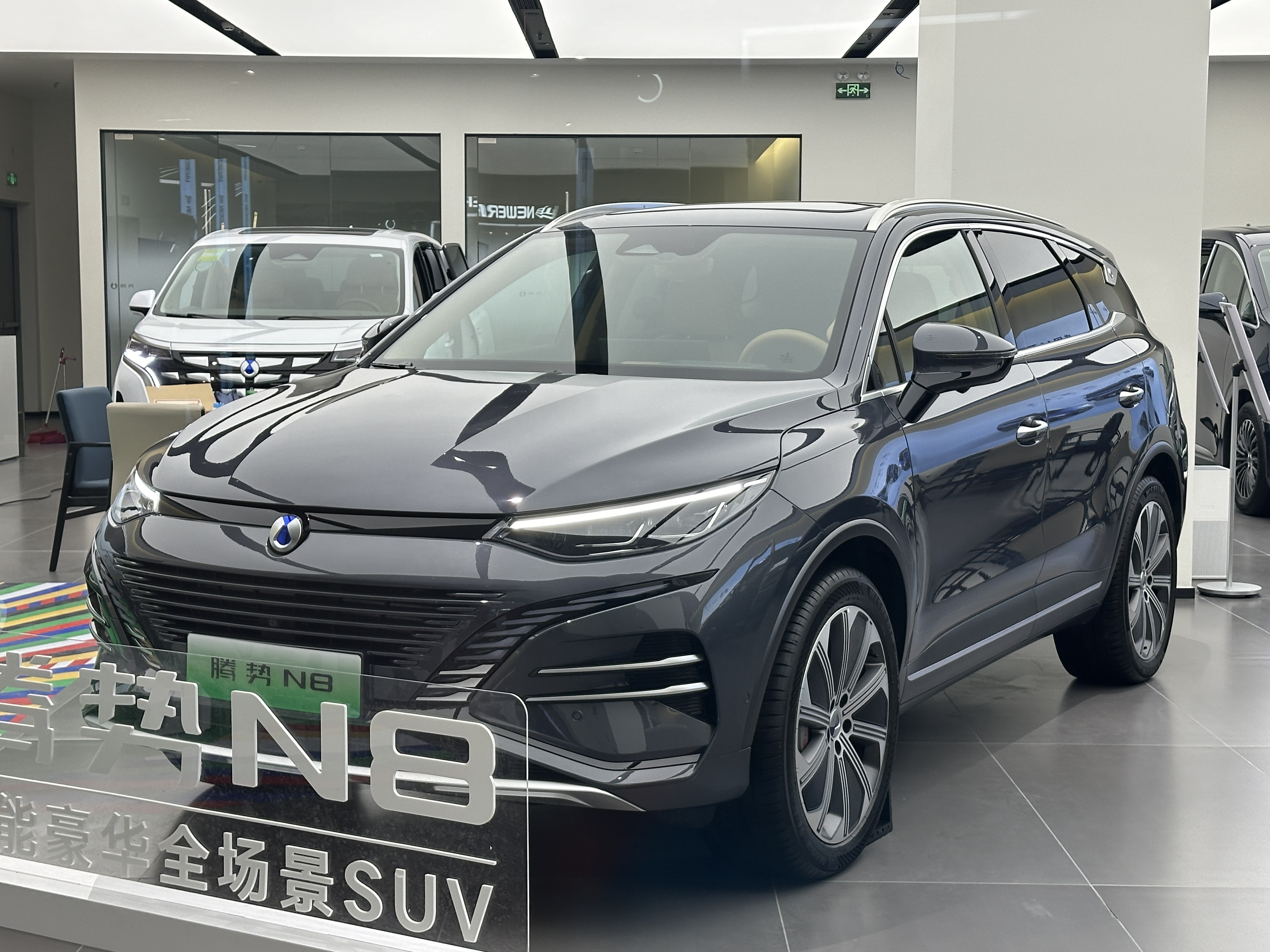
Denza N8 (DM-p)

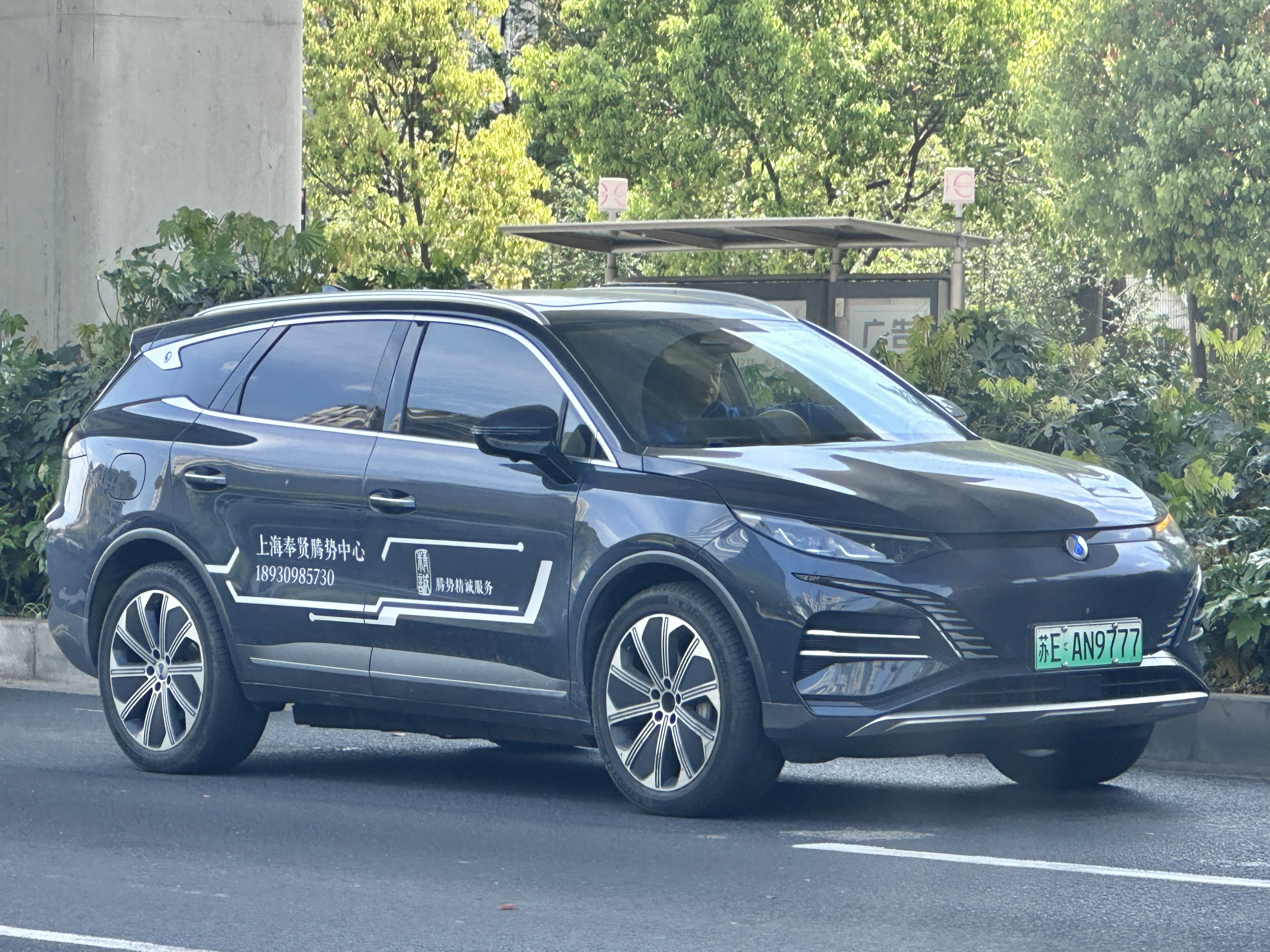
Denza N8 (EV)

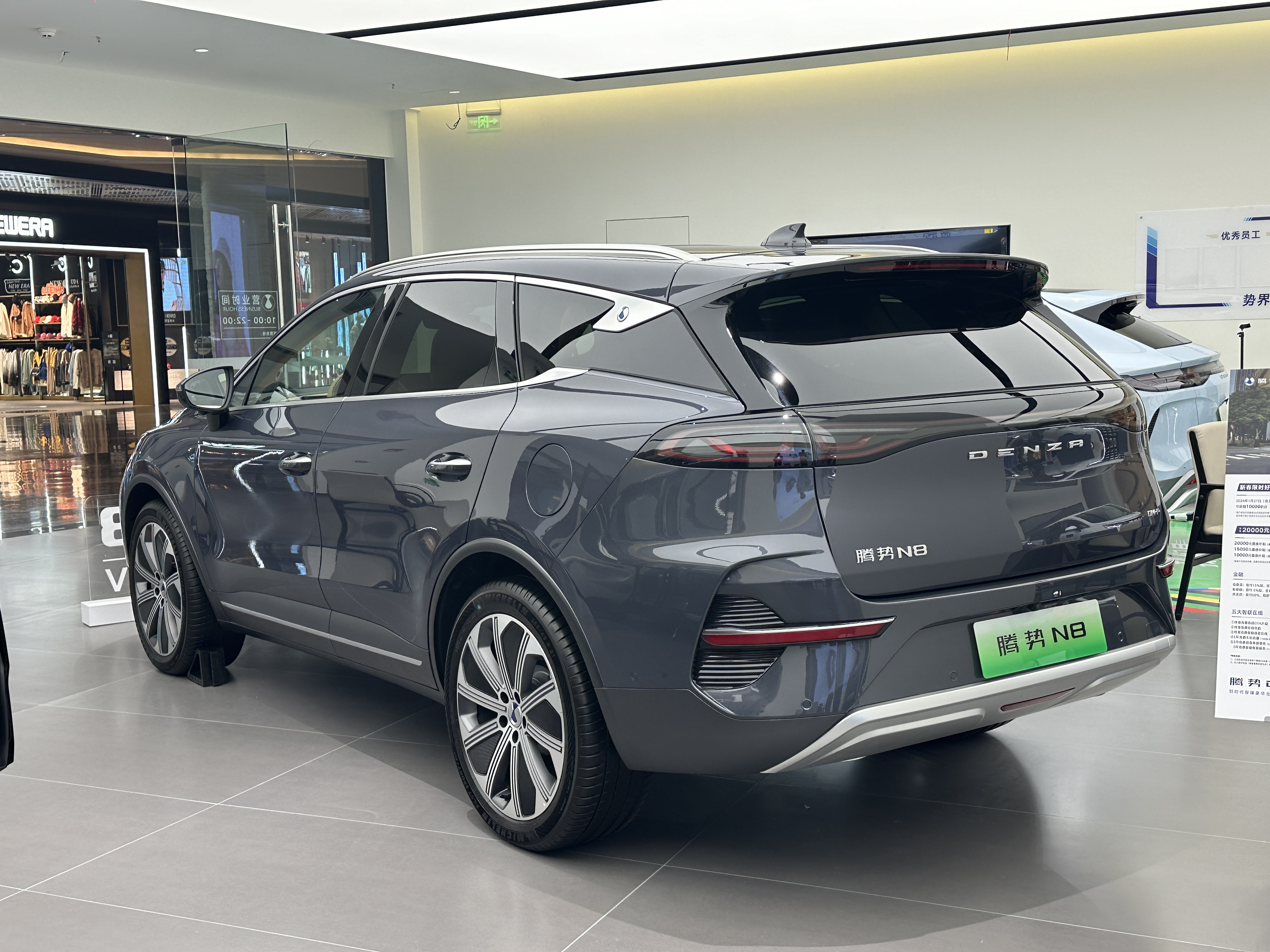
Rear view

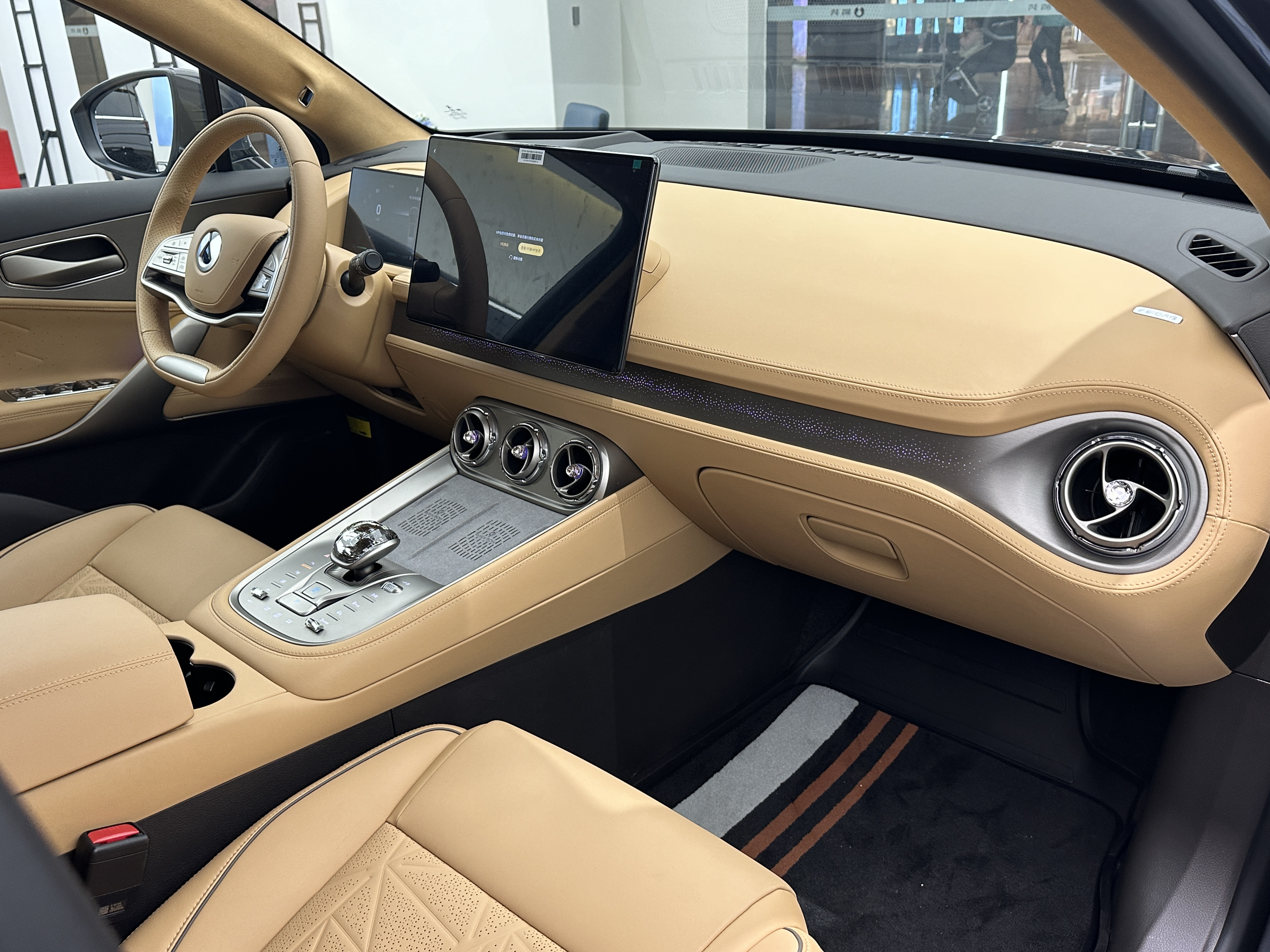
Interior

== Second generation (2026) ==
Second generation

Overview
- Production: 2026–present
- Assembly: China: Jinan, Shandong
- Designer: Under the lead of Wolfgang Egger

Body and chassis
- Layout: Rear-motor, rear-wheel drive; Tri-motor, all-wheel drive
- Related: Denza N8L; Denza N9; Denza Z9; BYD Datang; BYD Sealion 08

Powertrain
- Engine: Petrol plug-in hybrid: 1.5 L BYD472ZQB turbo I4
- Battery: 75.26 kWh Blade 2.0 LFP; 105.79 kWh Blade 2.0 LFP; 130.15 kWh Blade 2.0 LFP
- Range: 1,567 km (974 mi) (PHEV)
- Electric range: 800–970 km (497–603 mi) (EV, CLTC); 330 km (205 mi) (PHEV, WLTP); 435 km (270 mi) (PHEV, CLTC)

Dimensions
- Wheelbase: 3,075 mm (121.1 in)
- Length: 5,150 mm (202.8 in)
- Width: 1,999 mm (78.7 in)
- Height: 1,830 mm (72.0 in)
- Curb weight: 2,775–2,995 kg (6,118–6,603 lb) (EV)

The second generation N8 was reintroduced in 10 July 2026 as a smaller, two-row five-seat variant of the closely related three-row N8L. It is available as either a plug-in hybrid or battery electric vehicle, and was launched on 12 November 2026 in China, with deliveries of the electric variant beginning one week after and plug-in hybrid variant expected 1-2 months later.

The N8 shares the majority of its design with the N8L, though the front and rear fascias have been restyled with a distinct DRL signature and adding a near-full length rear light bar.

The N8 has a double wishbone front and five-link independent rear suspension geometry, and features the DiSus-A dual-chamber air suspension system with predictive adjustment. Rear-wheel drive variants come with ±7° of rear-wheel steering, and tri-motor models have ±10°. Exterior dimensions and wheelbase of a full-size suv, with turning radius (4.5 metre) smaller than most city cars. Both rear wheels can turn inwards at the same time, allowing for close to on-the-spot turning with 5 metre radius and better traction control on icy roads.

Its interior features an extensive use of leather, wood grain trim and ambient lighting. It is available in four color schemes. The dashboard features a continuous 30-inch widescreen display integrating central infotainment functions with entertainment functions for the front passenger, as well as a wider "sky screen" at the base of the windshield, spanning the 1.1 m (43 in) width of the dashboard. Unlike some competitors, that display is not projected and instead uses an actual display panel. All four seats across both rows feature heating, ventilation, massaging and "zero gravity" functions, allowing a maximum recline angle of 165 degrees and 146 degrees for the front and rear seats respectively, while the rear seats also feature 130 mm (5.1 in) of longitudinal adjustment. Other interior features include dual 50 W wireless chargers in the front, rear entertainment displays, a Devialet sound system, and a refrigerator.

The N8 is equipped with the DiPilot 300 ADAS system, which features one roof-mounted LiDAR, 3 mmWave radars, 11 cameras, and 12 ultrasonic sensors, and is capable of Level 2 supervised autonomous driving in highway and urban conditions.

Rear view

Interior

=== Specifications ===
The N8 features BYD's second generation blade (LFP) battery of either 105.97 or 130.15 kWh, providing up to 1,003 km (623 mi) of CLTC range. Using BYD's Flash Charging technology, it can charge from 10-97 percent in 9 minutes. A single motor, high-performance single motor and triple motor versions are available, with total power outputs of 310 kW (420 hp), 370 kW (500 hp) and 890 kW (1,190 hp) respectively. Triple motor 30100rpm, allows "compass turns" which locks front wheels and allows the rest of the vehicle to pivot around the front wheel(s) during parking.

Specifications
Battery		Motor		Power	Torque	Electric range		Charging		0–100 km/h (62 mph)	Top speed	Kerb weight
Capacity	Weight	Front	Rear	Power	Torque	WLTP	CLTC	10–70%	10–97%	0–100 km/h (62 mph)	Top speed	Kerb weight
75.26kWh	550 kg (1,213 lb)	160kW PMSM	2×180kW PMSM	697 hp (520 kW; 707 PS)	816 N⋅m (602 lb⋅ft)	330 km (205 mi)	435 km (270 mi)	5 min	9 min	4.3 s	200 km/h (124 mph)	
105.79kWh	755.5 kg (1,666 lb)		320kW TZ226QYC PMSM	429 hp (320 kW; 435 PS)	500 N⋅m (369 lb⋅ft)		800 km (497 mi)	5 min	9 min	6.0 s	240 km/h (149 mph)	2,725 kg (6,008 lb)
130.15kWh	885 kg (1,951 lb)		370kW TZ226QYD PMSM	496 hp (370 kW; 503 PS)	500 N⋅m (369 lb⋅ft)		970 km (603 mi)	5 min	9 min	6.1 s	240 km/h (149 mph)	2,860 kg (6,305 lb)
130.15kWh	885 kg (1,951 lb)	270kW TZ226QYA PMSM	2×310kW TZ226XYB PMSM	1,193 hp (890 kW; 1,210 PS)	1,080 N⋅m (797 lb⋅ft)		840 km (522 mi)	5 min	9 min	2.98 s	240 km/h (149 mph)	2,995 kg (6,603 lb)

== Sales ==
Year	China	
Year	X	N8
2020	3,813	—
2021	4,783	—
2022	175	—
2023	—	2,221
2024	—	469
2025	—	—
