= List of highways numbered 8A =

Route 8A can refer to the following highways:

== Greece ==
- EO8a road, remnants of the realigned Athens–Patras road that were not replaced by the A8 motorway

== New Zealand ==
- New Zealand State Highway 8A

== United States ==
- Florida State Road 8A
- Massachusetts Route 8A
- Nevada State Route 8A (former)
- County Route 8A (Monmouth County, New Jersey)
- County Route 8A (Columbia County, New York)
- Oklahoma State Highway 8A
- Vermont Route 8A

== See also ==
- List of highways numbered 8
- List of highways numbered A8
- 8A (disambiguation)

Preceded by 7A	Lists of highways 8A	Succeeded by 9A
