= List of highways numbered 8 =

The following highways are numbered 8. For roads numbered A8, see list of A8 roads. For roads numbered N8, see list of N8 roads.

Route 8, or Highway 8, may refer to:

== International ==
- AH8 Asian Highway 8
- E08 European route E08
- E008 European route E008

== Argentina ==
- National Route 8
- Buenos Aires Provincial Route 8

== Australia ==
=== New South Wales ===
- A8 (Sydney) (New South Wales)
- Westconnex M8 (New South Wales)

=== Northern Territory ===
- Ross Highway (Northern Territory)

=== Queensland ===
- Maroochydore Road (Queensland)

=== Tasmania ===
- East Tamar Highway (Tasmania)

=== South Australia and Victoria ===
==== South Australia ====
  - Dukes Highway
  - Western Highway (Victoria)(SA/VIC)

==== Victoria ====
  - Western Freeway (Victoria)
  - Western Highway (Victoria)
  - Ballarat Road, Melbourne

== Austria ==
- Innkreis Autobahn

== Bolivia ==
- National Route 8 (Bolivia)

== Bulgaria ==
- I-8 road (Bulgaria)

== Burma ==
- National Highway 8 (Burma)

== Cambodia ==
- National Highway 8 (Cambodia)

== Canada ==
- Alberta Highway 8
- British Columbia Highway 8
- Manitoba Highway 8
- New Brunswick Route 8
- Northwest Territories Highway 8 (Dempster Highway)
- Nova Scotia Trunk 8
- Ontario Highway 8
- Prince Edward Island Route 8
- Quebec Route 8 (former)
- Saskatchewan Highway 8
- Yukon Highway 8

== Czech Republic ==
- D8 Motorway
- R8 Expressway (Czech: Prosecká radiála)
- I/8 Highway (Czech: Silnice I/8)

== Djibouti ==
- RN-8 (Djibouti)

== Eswatini ==
- MR8 road

== Greece ==
- A8 motorway (Olympia Odos)
- EO8 road

- EO8a road, remnants of the realigned Athens–Patras road that were not replaced by the A8 motorway

== Hong Kong ==
- Route 8 (Hong Kong)

== Hungary ==
- M8 expressway (Hungary)
- Main road 8 (Hungary)

== India ==
- National Highway 8 (India)
- State Highway 8 (Karnataka)
- State Highway 8 (Kerala) or Main Eastern Highway
- State Highway 8 (Madhya Pradesh)
- State Highway 8 (West Bengal)

== Iraq ==
- Highway 8 (Iraq)

== Ireland ==
- M8 motorway (Republic of Ireland)
- N8 road (Ireland)

== Italy ==
- Autostrada A8
- RA 8

== Japan ==
- Japan National Route 8
- Hokuriku Expressway

== Malaysia ==
- East Coast Expressway
- Kuala Lumpur–Karak Expressway
- FT 8 Malaysia Federal Route 8
- A8 Perak State Route A8
- J8 Johor State Route J8
  - Johor State Route J8, Jalan Ulu Tiram–Seelong
  - Jalan Ulu Tiram (Also known as Federal Route 1375)
- M8 Malacca State Route M8
- N8 Negeri Sembilan State Route N8

== Mexico ==
- Mexican Federal Highway 8

== Montenegro ==
- M-8 highway (Montenegro)

== New Zealand ==
- New Zealand State Highway 8
  - New Zealand State Highway 8A
  - New Zealand State Highway 8B

== Nigeria ==
- A8 highway (Nigeria)

== Paraguay ==
- National Route 8

== Philippines ==
- N8 highway (Philippines)

== Poland ==
- Motorway A8
- Expressway S8
- National road 8

== Russia ==
- M8 highway (Russia)

== Taiwan ==
- National Freeway 8
- Provincial Highway 8

== United Kingdom ==
- M8 motorway (Great Britain)
- A8 road (Great Britain)
  - A8(M) motorway (Great Britain) (former)
- A8 road (Northern Ireland)
  - A8(M) motorway (Northern Ireland)

== United States ==
- Interstate 8
  - Interstate 8 Business
- U.S. Route 8
- New England Interstate Route 8 (former)
- Alabama State Route 8
  - County Route 8 (Lee County, Alabama)
- Alaska Route 8
- Arkansas Highway 8
- California State Route 8 (former)
  - California State Route 8U
- Colorado State Highway 8
- Connecticut Route 8
- Delaware Route 8
- Florida State Road 8
  - Florida State Road 8A
- Georgia State Route 8
- Idaho State Highway 8
- Illinois Route 8
- Indiana State Road 8
- Iowa Highway 8
- K-8 (Kansas highway)
- Kentucky Route 8
- Louisiana Highway 8
  - Louisiana State Route 8 (former)
- Maine State Route 8
- Maryland Route 8
- Massachusetts Route 8
  - Massachusetts Route 8A
- M-8 (Michigan highway)
- Mississippi Highway 8
- Missouri Route 8
  - Missouri Route 8 (1922) (former)
- Nebraska Highway 8
- Nevada State Route 8 (former)
  - Nevada State Route 8A (former)
  - Nevada State Route 8B (former)
- New Jersey Route 8 (former)
  - New Jersey Route 8N (former)
  - County Route 8 (Monmouth County, New Jersey)
    - County Route 8A (Monmouth County, New Jersey)
    - County Route 8B (Monmouth County, New Jersey)
- New Mexico State Road 8
- New York State Route 8
  - County Route 8 (Allegany County, New York)
  - County Route 8 (Broome County, New York)
  - County Route 8 (Cattaraugus County, New York)
  - County Route 8 (Chemung County, New York)
  - County Route 8 (Clinton County, New York)
  - County Route 8 (Columbia County, New York)
    - County Route 8A (Columbia County, New York)
  - County Route 8 (Dutchess County, New York)
  - County Route 8 (Genesee County, New York)
  - County Route 8 (Jefferson County, New York)
  - County Route 8 (Lewis County, New York)
  - County Route 8 (Nassau County, New York)
  - County Route 8 (Ontario County, New York)
  - County Route 8 (Oswego County, New York)
  - County Route 8 (Otsego County, New York)
  - County Route 8 (Rensselaer County, New York)
  - County Route 8 (Rockland County, New York)
  - County Route 8 (Schuyler County, New York)
  - County Route 8 (St. Lawrence County, New York)
  - County Route 8 (Suffolk County, New York)
  - County Route 8 (Ulster County, New York)
- North Carolina Highway 8
- North Dakota Highway 8
- Ohio State Route 8
- Oklahoma State Highway 8
  - Oklahoma State Highway 8A
  - Oklahoma State Highway 8B
- Oregon Route 8
- Pennsylvania Route 8
- South Carolina Highway 8
- South Dakota Highway 8 (former)
- Tennessee State Route 8
- Texas State Highway 8
  - Texas State Highway Beltway 8
  - Texas State Highway Loop 8
  - Texas Farm to Market Road 8
  - Texas Park Road 8
  - Texas Recreational Road 8
- Utah State Route 8
  - Utah State Route 8 (1910-1977) (former)
- Vermont Route 8
  - Vermont Route 8A
- Virginia State Route 8
- Washington State Route 8
  - Primary State Highway 8 (Washington) (former)
- West Virginia Route 8

Territories

- Guam Highway 8
- Puerto Rico Highway 8

== Uruguay ==
- Route 8 Brigadier Gral. Juan Antonio Lavalleja

== Vietnam ==
- Vietnam National Route 8

== Zambia ==
- M8 road (Zambia)

== See also ==
- List of A8 roads
- List of highways numbered 8A

Preceded by 7	Lists of highways 8	Succeeded by 9
