= A8 =

A8, A08, A 8 or A-8 may refer to:

== Electronics ==
- ARM Cortex-A8, a processor used in mobile devices
- Apple A8, a 64-bit system on a chip (SoC) designed by Apple Inc.
- AMD A8, an AMD APU
- Samsung Galaxy A8, various smartphones
- Atari 8-bit computers, a series of 8-bit home computers

== Military ==
- Curtiss A-8, a US attack aircraft used in the 1930s
- General Dynamics Model 100, a development project which may have entered service as the A-8A
- A8, the military staff designation in the continental staff system for air force headquarters staff concerned with finance
- A8, a model of German Aggregate Series Rocket from World War II
- A 8, a Swedish artillery regiment

== Transport, vehicles and vessels ==
=== Air transport ===
- Curtiss A-8, a US attack aircraft used in the 1930s
- A08, the FAA Location Identifier for Vaiden Field
- Liberia (aircraft registration prefix "A8")
- Benin Golf Air airlines (IATA code "A8")

=== Other uses in transport, vehicles and vessels ===
- Arrows A8, a 1985 British racing car
- Audi A8, a flagship full-sized luxury sedan
- HMS A8, an A-class submarine of Britain's Royal Navy
- LNER Class A8, a British 4-6-2T steam locomotive class

== Other uses ==
- A8 (classification), an amputee sport classification
- ATC code A08 Antiobesity preparations, excluding diet products, a subgroup of the Anatomical Therapeutic Chemical Classification System
- Réti Opening (Encyclopaedia of Chess Openings code "A08")
- A8, in the aquatic communities in the British National Vegetation Classification system
- A8, an ISO 216 international standard paper size
- A8 road, in several countries
- Subfamily A8, in the rhodopsin-like receptors subfamily of proteins
- The A8 countries, short for "accession eight", the ex-communist European countries that acceded to the EU in 2004
- Asphalt 8, a Gameloft mobile racing game
- "A8", song by Black Eyed Peas from Behind the Front

== See also ==
- 8A (disambiguation)
