= Denza N8L =

Full-size SUV by Denza

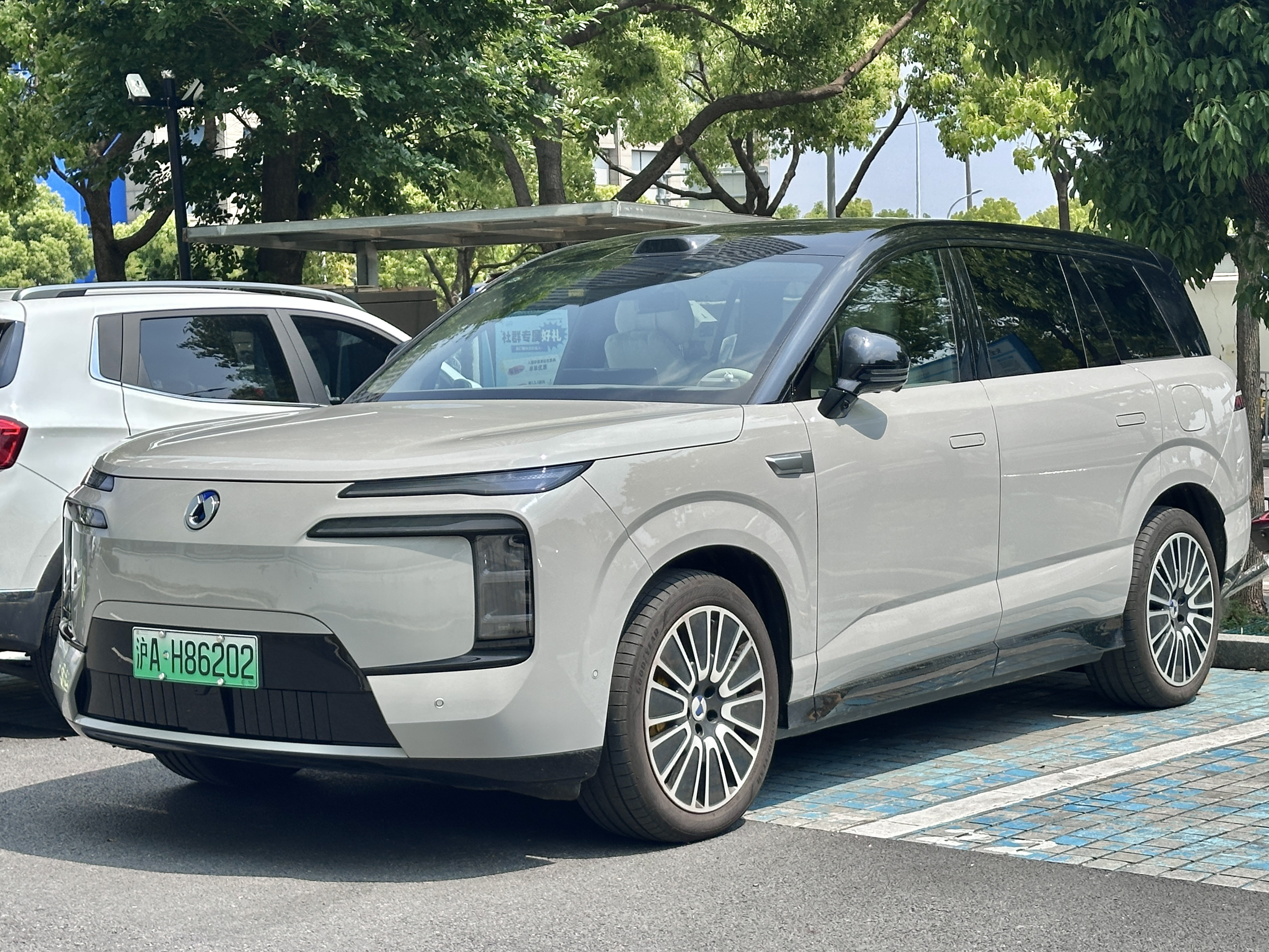

Overview
- Manufacturer: Denza (BYD Auto)
- Production: 2025–present
- Assembly: China: Jinan, Shandong
- Designer: Under the lead of Wolfgang Egger

Body and chassis
- Class: Full-size SUV
- Body style: 5-door SUV
- Layout: Battery electric: Rear-motor, rear-wheel-drive; PHEV; Front-engine, tri-motor, all-wheel-drive
- Platform: e^{3} platform
- Related: Denza N8; Denza N9; Denza Z9; BYD Datang; BYD Sealion 08

Powertrain
- Engine: Petrol plug-in hybrid: 2.0 L BYD479ZQA turbo I4
- Electric motor: PMSM
- Power output: 496–955 hp (370–712 kW; 503–968 PS)
- Hybrid drivetrain: Plug-in hybrid
- Battery: 47.0 kWh LFP BYD; 75.26 kWh Blade 2.0 LFP; 130.15 kWh Blade 2.0 LFP
- Electric range: 160–320 km (99–199 mi) (PHEV, WLTP); 230–340 km (143–211 mi) (PHEV, CLTC); 960 km (597 mi) (BEV, CLTC)
- Plug-in charging: DC: 100–728 kW (PHEV)

Dimensions
- Wheelbase: 3,075 mm (121.1 in)
- Length: 5,200 mm (204.7 in)
- Width: 1,999 mm (78.7 in)
- Height: 1,820 mm (71.7 in)
- Curb weight: 2,900–3,120 kg (6,393–6,878 lb)

The Denza N8L (Chinese: 腾势N8L; pinyin: Téngshì N8L) is a plug-in hybrid full-size SUV that's designed, produced and sold by Denza, a premium marque of BYD Auto.

It is closely related to the slightly smaller, five-seat battery electric second generation N8.

== Overview ==
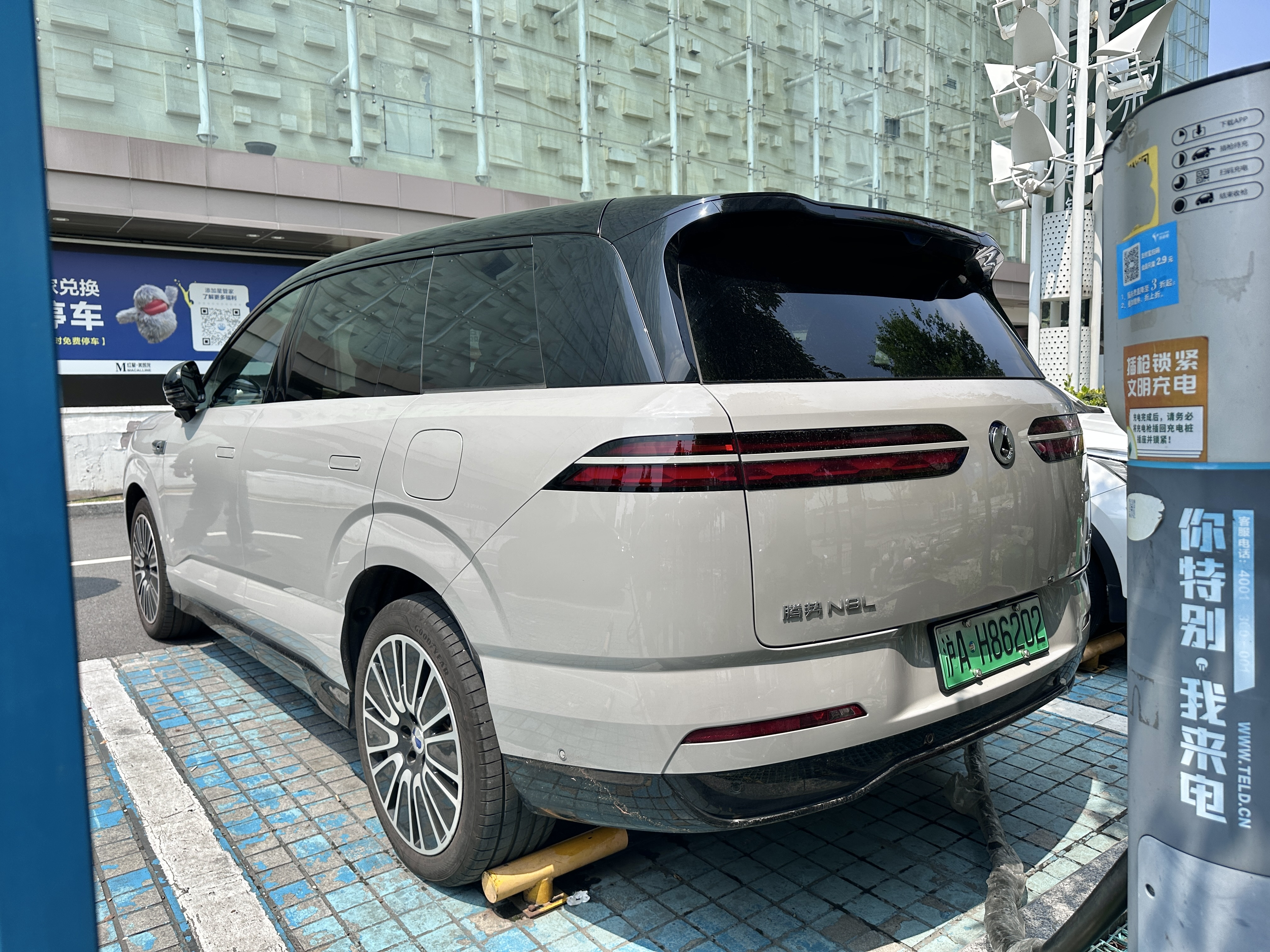
Rear view

The Denza N8L is a 5-door SUV that slots between the smaller N8 and larger N9. Similar to those vehicles, it uses the e^{3} platform developed by BYD.

Pre-sales began on 26 September 2025, ahead of the N8L's launch on 28 October 2025.

Denza launched a battery-electric version of the N8L in China on 14 September 2026, alongside the existing plug-in hybrid model. The two variants were priced at 299,800 yuan and 329,800 yuan. The electric version was reported to have a 130.15 kWh battery and a single rear-mounted motor producing 370 kW.

=== Design ===
The N8L uses design features shared with the rest or the lineup, such as parallel front end daytime running lights and hourglass-inspired taillights. Also present is a trapezoidal air intake and active grille shutters unlike the N9. Flush door handles also make an appearance. With the exception of the A-pillar all the pillars have a gloss black finish.

=== Chassis ===
The N8L is expected to use the e^{3} platform, likely featuring the DiSus-A intelligent suspension system, rear-wheel steering, front compass turning and intelligent crab walking. It has 7–10° of rear-wheel steering, allowing for a turning radius of 5.45 metres (17.9 ft) for BEV and 4.58 metres (15.0 ft) for PHEV models.

=== Features ===
The N8L has an optional drone system that uses a drone supplied by DJI. If equipped, the height of the vehicle is increased by 170 mm (6 in). The "God's Eye B" intelligent driving system is also expected to be available on the N8L. The interior is expected to feature a 15.6-inch central touchscreen and a 12.3-inch instrument cluster.

== Powertrain ==
The N8L is expected to be powered by a 2.0-liter turbocharged inline-4 engine producing 204 horsepower. Three electric motors are also included, with the front motor generating 268 horsepower and both rear motors providing a combined 483 horsepower. The total combined power output is 955 horsepower.

The original PHEV N8L is equipped with a 46.992 kWh LFP battery capable of 170 kilometres (106 mi) WLTP range and recharging from 30–80% in 19 minutes.

The PHEV version was refreshed for 2026 with a significantly larger 75.26 kWh BYD Blade 2.0 battery, capable of 320 kilometres (199 mi) WLTP electric range and recharging from 10–97% in 9 minutes.

The pure electric version is equipped with a 130.15 kWh BYD Blade 2.0 battery providing 960 kilometres (597 mi) of CLTC range and recharging from 10–97% in 9 minutes.

Specifications
Battery		Engine	Motor		Power	Torque	Range		DCFC	0–100 km/h (62 mph)	Top speed	Kerb weight
Type	Weight	Engine	Front	Rear	Power	Torque	WLTP	CLTC	Peak kW	0–100 km/h (62 mph)	Top speed	Kerb weight
PHEV
46.992 kWh LFP	413 kg (911 lb)	2.0 L BYD479ZQA turbo I4; 201 hp (150 kW; 204 PS)	200 kW TZ210XYD PMSM	2×360 kW TZ220XYBM PMSM	751 hp (560 kW; 761 PS)	871 N⋅m (642 lb⋅ft)	170 km (106 mi)	230 km (143 mi)	100 kW	3.9 sec	220 km/h (137 mph)	2,980 kg (6,570 lb)
75.264 kWh Blade 2.0 LFP	550 kg (1,213 lb)	2.0 L BYD479ZQA turbo I4; 201 hp (150 kW; 204 PS)	200 kW TZ210XYD PMSM	2×360 kW TZ220XYBM PMSM	751 hp (560 kW; 761 PS)	871 N⋅m (642 lb⋅ft)	320 km (199 mi)	430 km (267 mi)	728 kW	3.7 sec	220 km/h (137 mph)	3,120 kg (6,878 lb)
BEV
130.15 kWh Blade 2.0 LFP	885 kg (1,951 lb)	—	—	370 kW TZ226QYD PMSM	496 hp (370 kW; 503 PS)	500 N⋅m (369 lb⋅ft)		960 km (597 mi)		6.4 sec	240 km/h (149 mph)	2,900 kg (6,393 lb)

== Sales ==
Year	China
2025	12,834
