= Hanandō Station =

Railway station in Fukui, Japan

Hanandō Station 花堂駅
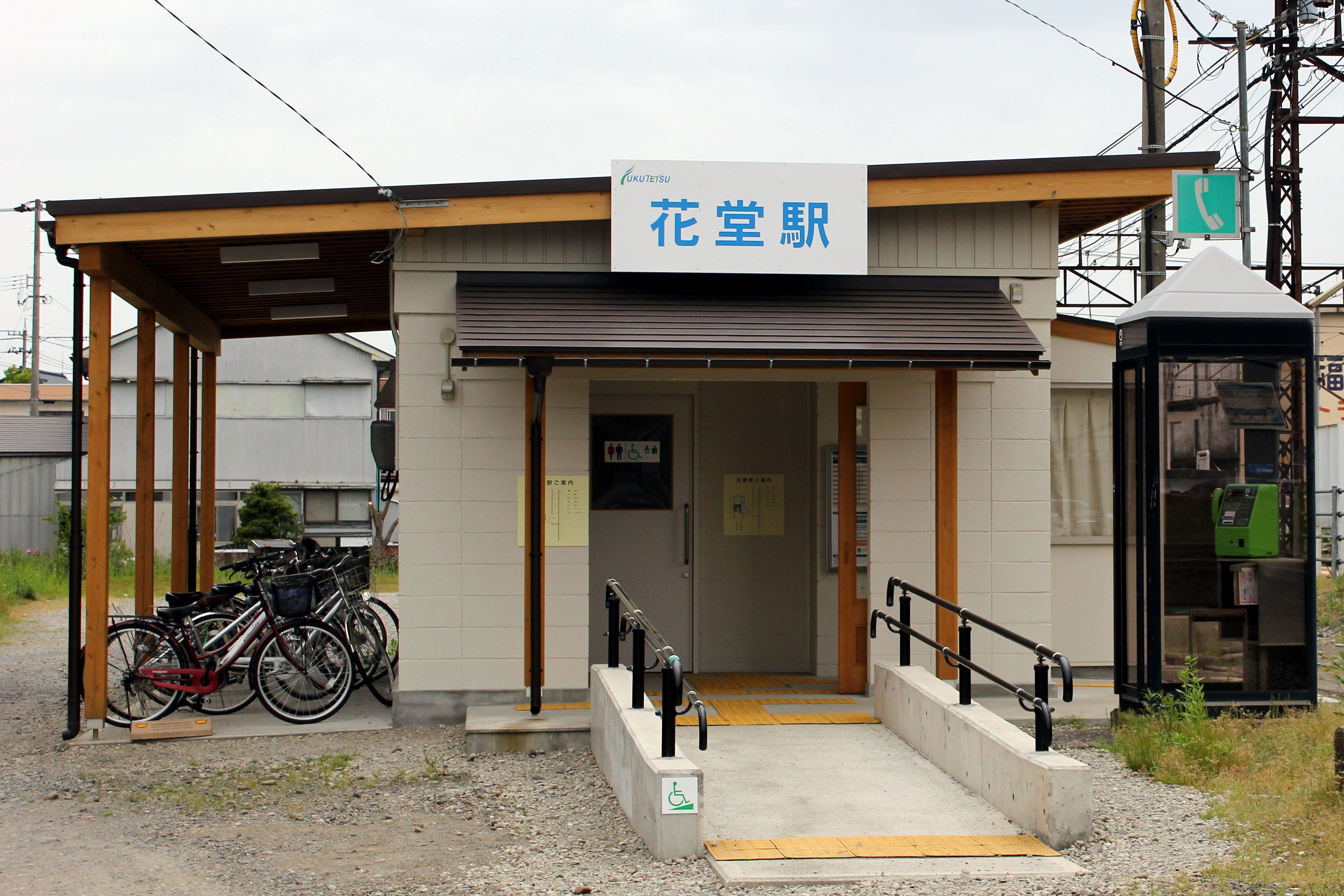
- Hanandō Station entrance in February 2013

General information
- Location: 1–11 Hanandō-kita, Fukui-shi, Fukui-ken 918-8012; Japan
- Coordinates: 36°02′26″N 136°12′54″E
- Operator: Fukui Railway
- Line: ■ Fukubu Line
- Distance: 16.9 kilometres (10.5 mi) from Takefu-shin
- Platforms: 1 side platform
- Tracks: 1
- Connections: Bus stop

Other information
- Status: Unstaffed
- Station code: F17
- Website: Official website

History
- Opened: July 26, 1925
Location
- Location within Japan

Hanandō Station (花堂駅, Hanandō-eki) is a Fukui Railway Fukubu Line railway station located in the city of Fukui, Fukui Prefecture, Japan.

== Lines ==
Hanandō Station is served by the Fukui Railway Fukubu Line, and is located 16.9 kilometers from the terminus of the line at Takefu-shin.

== Station layout ==
The station consists of one ground-level side platform serving a single bi-directional track. The station is unattended.

== Adjacent stations ==
«	Service	»
Fukui Railway Fukubu Line
Express: Does not stop at this station
Bell-mae	Local	Sekijūjimae

== History ==
The station opened on July 26, 1925. In July 1950 the Fukubu Line double-tracked from this station to Fukui-Shin Station. Freight operations were abolished in 1977.

== Surrounding area ==
- Immediately to the west is Prefectural Route 299 (Phoenix-dōri); many trucking companies line the road nearby.
- Fukui Municipal Fire Department – Minami Fire Station
- Ministry of Land, Infrastructure, and Transport – Chubu District Transport Bureau, Fukui Transport Branch Office
- JR West Echizen-Hanandō Station is located approximately 300 meters to the east.

== See also ==
- List of railway stations in Japan
