= Ebata Station =

Railway station in Fukui, Fukui prefecture, Japan

Ebata Station 江端駅
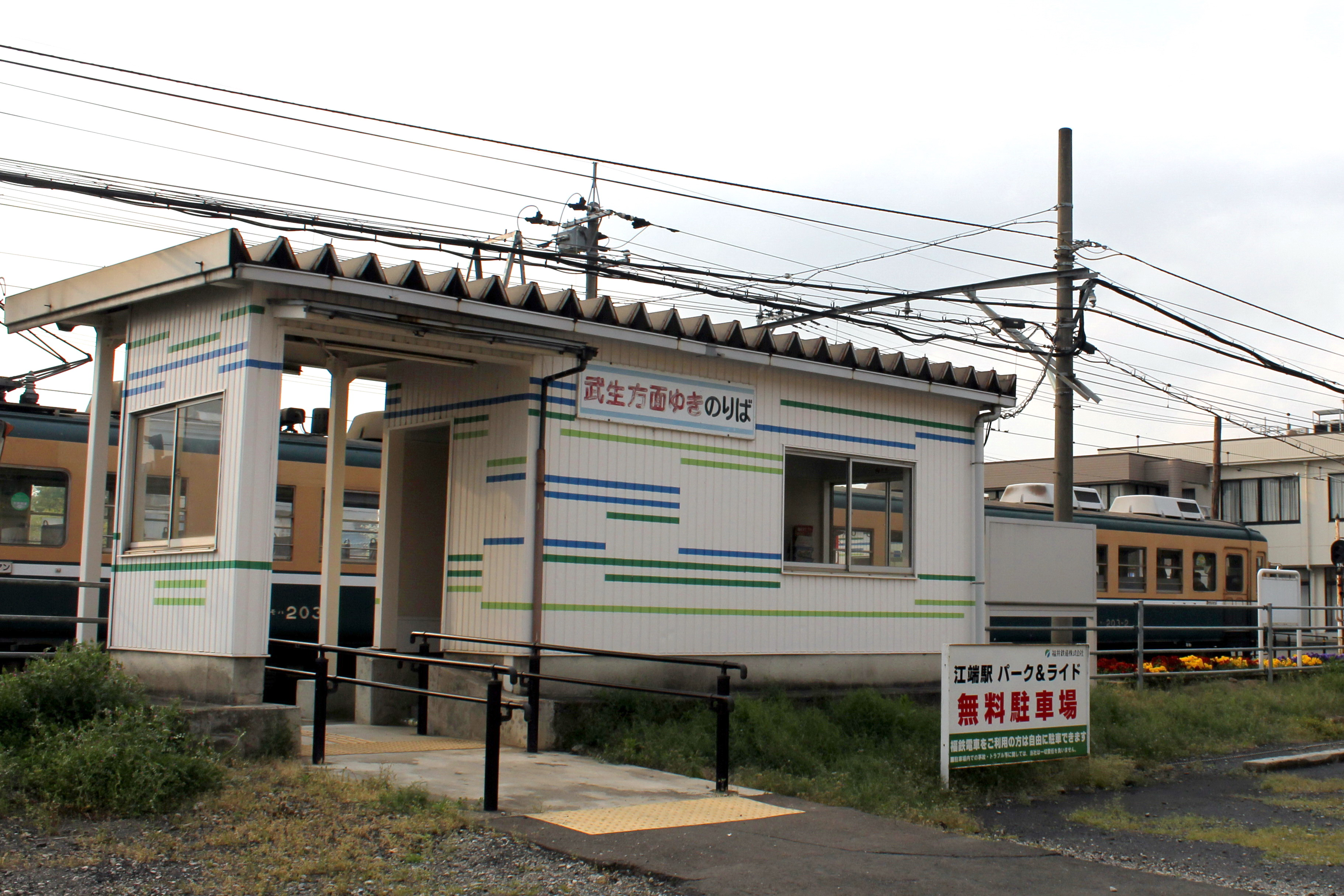
- Ebata Station in May 2013

General information
- Location: 21-19 Ebata-chō, Fukui-shi, Fukui-ken 918-8016; Japan
- Coordinates: 36°01′41″N 136°12′44″E
- Operator: Fukui Railway
- Line: ■ Fukubu Line
- Distance: 15.5 km from Takefu-shin
- Platforms: 2 side platforms
- Tracks: 2
- Connections

Other information
- Status: Staffed
- Station code: F15
- Website: Official website

History
- Opened: July 26, 1925
Location
- Location within Japan

Ebata Station (江端駅, Ebata-eki) is a Fukui Railway Fukubu Line railway station located in the city of Fukui, Fukui Prefecture, Japan. The station opened on July 26, 1925.

== Lines ==
Ebata Station is served by the Fukui Railway Fukubu Line, and is located 15.5 kilometers from the terminus of the line at Takefu-shin.

== Station layout ==
The station consists of two ground-level opposed side platforms connected by a level crossing. The station is unattended.

== Adjacent stations ==
«	Service	»
Fukui Railway Fukubu Line
Express: Does not stop at this station
Seimei	Local	Bell-mae

== Surrounding area ==
- Ebata-chō Public Hall
- Fukui Municipal Ebata Danchi
- Fukui Sen'i Warehouse company headquarters
- Fukui Forest Association headquarters

== See also ==
- List of railway stations in Japan
