= Bell-mae Station =

Railway station in Fukui City, Fukui Prefecture, Japan

Bell-mae Station ベル前駅
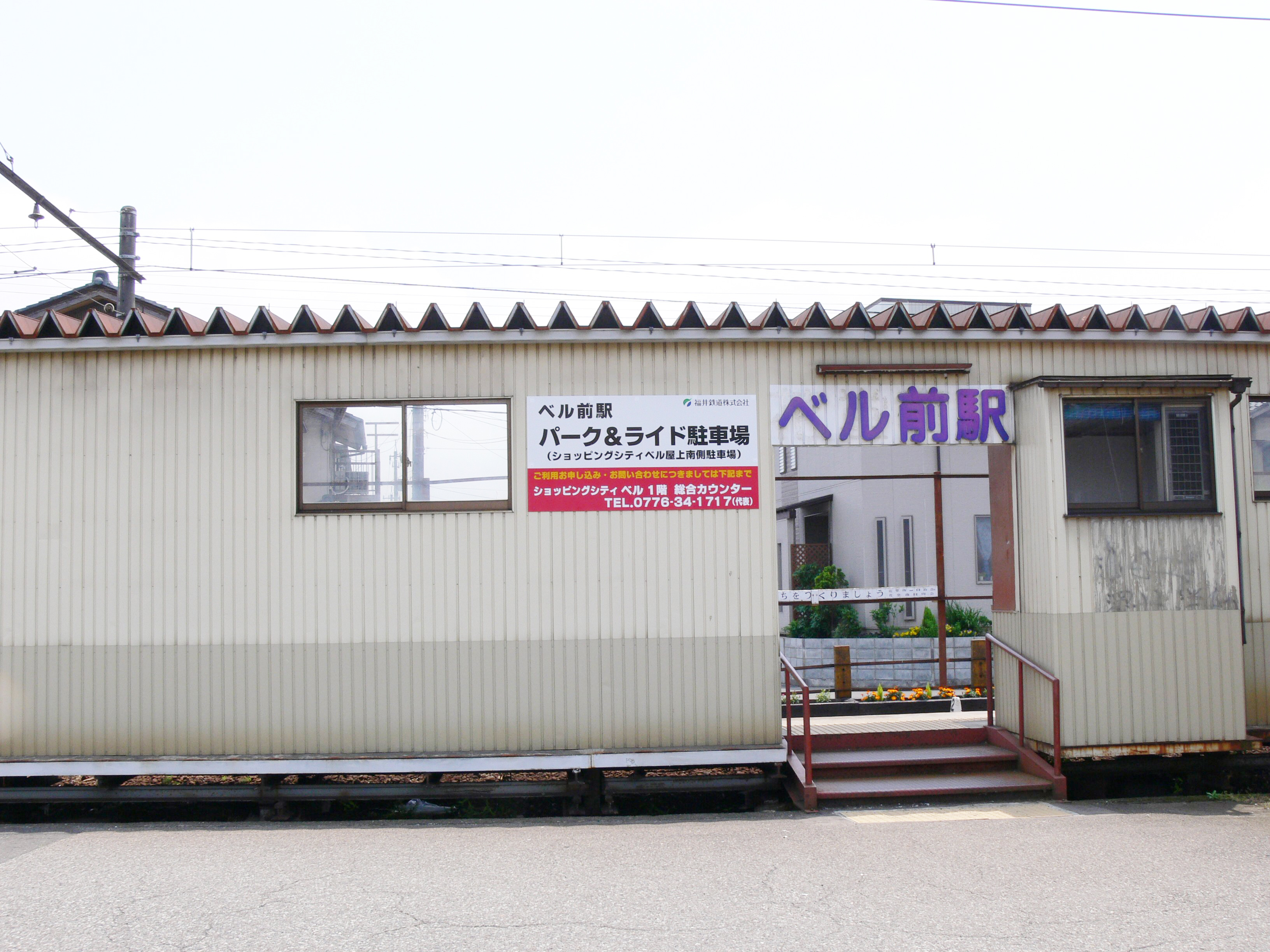
- Station building

General information
- Location: 1-chōme-11 Hanandōminami, Fukui, Fukui Prefecture; Japan
- Coordinates: 36°2′1″N 136°12′50″E
- System: Railway station
- Operator: Fukui Railway
- Line: Fukui Railway Fukubu Line
- Distance: 16.1 km from Takefu-Shin Station
- Platforms: 1 side platform
- Tracks: 1

Construction
- Structure type: At-grade

Other information
- Station code: F16

History
- Opened: October 1, 1989

Passengers
- 391 daily (2019)
Location

Bell-mae Station (ベル前駅, Bellmae-eki) is a railway station on the Fukui Railway Fukubu Line operated by Fukui Railway in Fukui, Fukui Prefecture, Japan. The station is numbered F16.

== History ==
- October 1, 1989: Opened as Hanado Minami Station (花堂南駅).
- April 15, 1993: Renamed Bell-mae Station.
- March 25, 2010: Became a stop for express trains as part of a timetable revision.
- 2016: Began operations for direct services to Echizen Railway's Mikuni Awara Line.

== Station layout ==
The station consists of a single side platform serving one track. It is an at-grade station. Staff are only present during some daytime hours (10:00 am to 3:00 pm).

Platform	Line	Direction	Destination
Side platform	Fukubu Line	Up	Ebata Station
	Fukubu Line	Down	Hanandō Station

== Passenger statistics ==
In fiscal year 2019, the station was used by an average of 391 passengers daily.

== Surrounding area ==
- Shopping City Bell, a shopping center in front of the station that the name "Bell" refers to.
- Hokuriku Electric Power Matsuoka Substation
- Fukui South Police Station (福井南警察署)
- National Route 8

== Adjacent stations ==
Line	Preceding station	Distance	Following station
Fukui Railway Fukubu Line	Ebata Station (F15)	0.6 km	Hanandō Station (F17)
