= 8N (disambiguation) =

The 8N was a November 8, 2012, political demonstration in Argentina

8N may also refer to:

- 8N or 8°N, the 8th parallel north latitude
- NJ 8N, now New Jersey Route 284
- 8N, a model of Ford N-Series tractor
- 8N, a model of Fordson tractor
- 8N powertrain, used in some Audi TT

== See also ==
- N8 (disambiguation)
