= Denza Z9S =

Battery electric full-size sports sedan

Overview
- Manufacturer: BYD Auto
- Production: 2026–present
- Assembly: China: Shenzhen, Guangdong
- Designer: Under the lead of Wolfgang Egger

Body and chassis
- Class: Full-size car (E)
- Body style: 4-door sedan
- Layout: Rear-motor, rear-wheel-drive; Front-motor, tri-motor, all-wheel-drive
- Platform: e-Platform 3.0 Evo
- Related: Denza Z9; Fangchengbao Formula S

Powertrain
- Electric motor: 370 kW TZ226QYD (RWD); 270 kW TZ226QYA + 2× 310 kW TZ226XYB (AWD)
- Power output: 496 hp (370 kW; 503 PS) (RWD); 1,194 hp (890 kW; 1,211 PS) (AWD)
- Battery: 102.326 kWh BYD Blade 2.0 LFP; 122.496 kWh BYD Blade 2.0 LFP
- Electric range: 780–920 km (485–572 mi) (CLTC)

Dimensions
- Wheelbase: 3,025 mm (119.1 in)
- Length: 5,090 mm (200.4 in)
- Width: 1,980 mm (78.0 in)
- Height: 1,490 mm (58.7 in)
- Curb weight: 2,397–2,588 kg (5,284–5,706 lb)

Chronology
- Predecessor: Denza Z9

The Denza Z9S (Chinese: 腾势Z9S; pinyin: Téngshì Z9S) is a battery electric sports sedan marketed by Denza, a brand owned by Chinese manufacturer BYD Auto. It is a shorter-wheelbase, sedan-only companion to the Denza Z9, positioned as a lower priced version sold alongside the original Z9 sedan for the Chinese market, with the "S" suffix denoting "sports sedan".

== History ==
The Z9S was revealed through filing documents submitted to China's Ministry of Industry and Information Technology (MIIT), published on 11 May 2026. Official images followed on 17 July 2026, alongside confirmation that the model had completed MIIT registration and was scheduled for release 2026.

Compared to standard Z9 sedan, the Z9S is 145 mm (5.7 in) shorter in length, 100 mm (3.9 in) shorter in wheelbase, 10 mm (0.4 in) narrower, and 28 mm (1.1 in) lower.

Denza says the Z9S's chassis consists of 91.1% high-strength steel and aluminium alloy, including 2000 MPa reinforcements, resulting in an overall torsional stiffness of 45,036 N·m/°.

Rear view

Interior

=== Design ===
The Z9S is similar in design to other Denza models. Split headlights are used, including slim two-line DRL signatures and split high/low beam units embedded in either side of the front bumper. A rear-facing lidar unit is fitted, a feature not present on the standard Z9. At launch, the model introduces a new exterior colour, Dawn Purple (Chinese: 曙光紫).

The interior features a 17.3-inch central display, 12.3-inch instrument cluster, and a 50-inch AR head-up display. An area next to the central display is magnetized, allowing the front passenger to attach certain accessories, such as a phone stand. All seats offer heating and ventilation, while the front seats also have massage functions. In the rear, a 7-inch display is included in the armrest to control climate, lighting and entertainment related features. It also has 44 storage compartments in the interior, a 470 L (17 cu ft) rear trunk, and a 120 L (4.2 cu ft) front trunk.

== Powertrain ==
The Z9S will be offered exclusively as a battery electric vehicle, in single-motor rear-wheel-drive and tri-motor all-wheel-drive configurations, both paired with a 102.326 kWh LFP battery. The rear-wheel-drive variant uses a single 370 kW rear motor producing 496 hp (370 kW; 503 PS), with a claimed CLTC range of 920 km (572 mi). The all-wheel-drive variant pairs a 270 kW front motor with a pair of 310 kW motors independently driving each rear wheel, BYD's "Yisanfang" tri-motor system, also used in the Z9 GT for a combined output of 1,194 hp (890 kW; 1,211 PS), exceeding the output of the Z9 GT, and a claimed CLTC range of 780 km (485 mi). Claimed top speed rises from 250 km/h (155 mph) on the rear-wheel-drive variant to a range of 250–270 km/h (155–168 mph) on the all-wheel-drive variant.

Specifications
Model	Battery		Motors		Power	Torque	Range	0–100 km/h (62 mph)	Top speed	Kerb weight
Model	Type	Weight	Front	Rear	Power	Torque	CLTC	0–100 km/h (62 mph)	Top speed	Kerb weight
RWD	102.326 kWh LFP Blade 2.0	725.9 kg (1,600 lb)	—	370 kW TZ226QYD (rated: 185 kW)	496 hp (370 kW; 503 PS)	500 N⋅m (369 lb⋅ft)	920 km (572 mi)	5.2 sec	250 km/h (155 mph)	2,397–2,438 kg (5,284–5,375 lb)
Tri-motor AWD	102.326 kWh LFP Blade 2.0	725.9 kg (1,600 lb)	270 kW TZ226QYA (rated: 90 kW)	2×310 kW TZ226XYB (rated: 80 kW each)	1,194 hp (890 kW; 1,211 PS)	1,080 N⋅m (797 lb⋅ft)	780 km (485 mi)	2.68 sec	270 km/h (168 mph)	2,588 kg (5,706 lb)
RWD Long Range	122.496 kWh LFP Blade 2.0	862.4 kg (1,901 lb)	—	370 kW TZ226QYD (rated: 185 kW)	496 hp (370 kW; 503 PS)	500 N⋅m (369 lb⋅ft)	1,100 km (684 mi)	5.3 sec	250 km/h (155 mph)	2,545 kg (5,611 lb)
