= List of A8 roads =

This is a list of roads designated A8:

- A008 road (Argentina), a beltway around the city of Rosario
- A8 highway (Australia) may refer to:
  - A8 (Sydney), a road in the Northern Beaches of Sydney
  - East Tamar Highway, a road connecting Launceston and Low Head
  - Western Highway, a road connecting Melbourne and Adelaide
- A8 motorway (Austria), from the A1-A9 junction in Austria to the German border where it joins Bundesautobahn 3
- A8 road (China) may refer to:
  - A8 expressway (Shanghai), a road connecting Xinzhuang Interchange and Hangzhou
- A8 motorway (Croatia), a road connecting Kanfanar near Rovinj and Matulji near Rijeka
- A8 motorway (France), a road connecting Aix-en-Provence and the A7 to the Côte d'Azur
- A8 motorway (Germany), a road connecting the Luxembourg and Austrian borders
- A8 motorway (Greece), a road connecting Athens and Patras
- A8 motorway (Italy), a road connecting Varese and Milan
- A8 road (Latvia), a road connecting Riga and Jelgava to the Lithuanian border
- A8 highway (Lithuania), a road connecting Panevėžys and Sitkūnai
- A8 motorway (Netherlands), a road connecting Amsterdam and Zaandijk
- A8 highway (Nigeria), a road connecting Numan and Jimeta in Adamawa State
- A8 autostrada (Poland), a road bypassing the city of Wrocław
- A8 motorway (Portugal), a road connecting Lisbon and Leiria via Caldas da Rainha
- A8 motorway (Romania), a planned road connecting the historical regions of Moldavia and Transylvania
- A-8 motorway (Spain), a road connecting Bilbao and Baamonde in Galicia
- A 8 road (Sri Lanka), a road connecting Panadura and Ratnapura
- A8 motorway (Switzerland), a road connecting Spiez and Lucerne
- A8 road (United Kingdom) may refer to:
  - A8 road (Northern Ireland), a road connecting Larne and Belfast
  - A8 road (Scotland), a road connecting Edinburgh to Greenock
- A8 road (United States of America) may refer to:
  - County Route A8 (California), a road in Tehama County connecting SR 99 in Tehama and SR 36 in Red Bluff
- A8 road (Zimbabwe), a road in Zimbabwe
- Batu Gajah Highway, a road in Perak, Malaysia

== See also ==
- List of highways numbered 8
- List of highways numbered 8A
