= National Highway 8 (Djibouti) =

Road in Djibouti

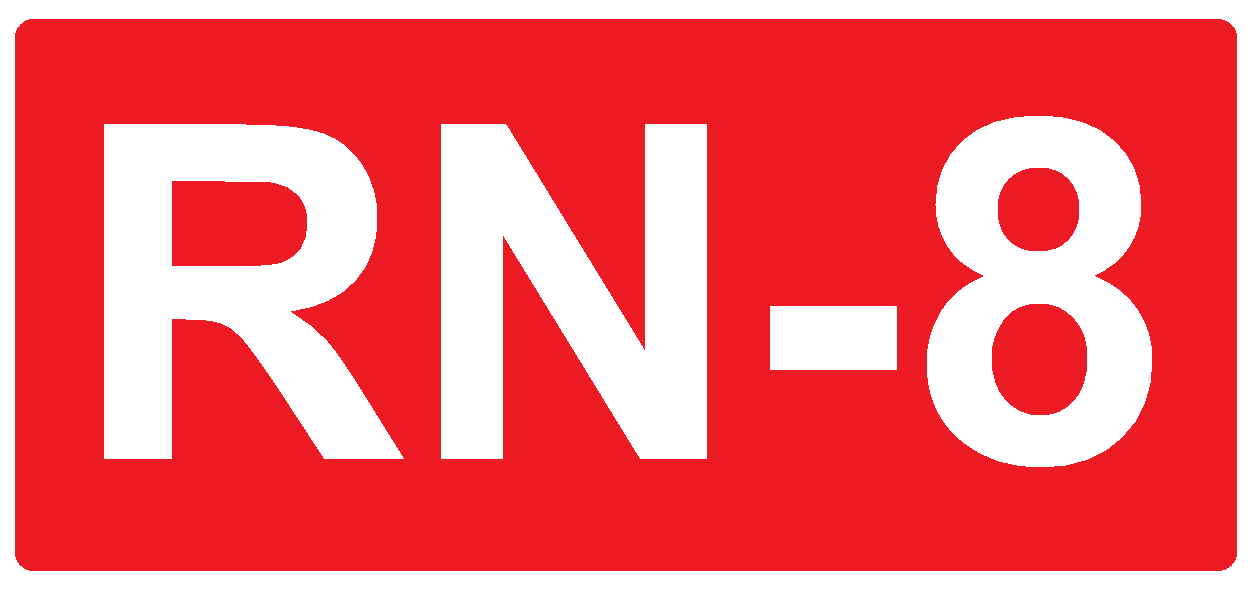
National Highway 8
- Arabic: الطريق السريع الوطنى 8 French: Route Nationale 8
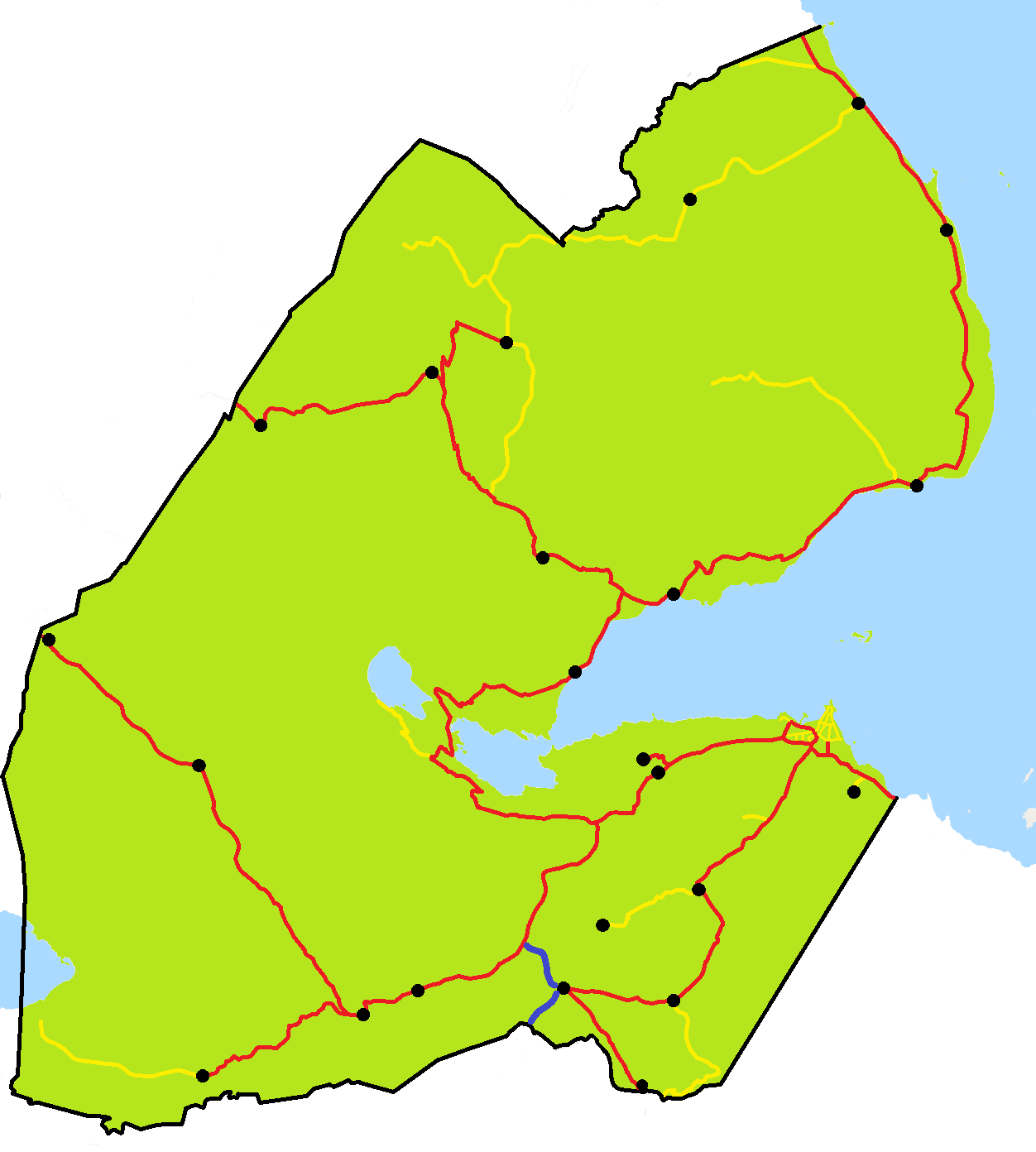

Route information
- Length: 24 km (15 mi)

Major junctions
- From: Junction with National Highway 1
- To: Ethiopian Border

Location
- Country: Djibouti
- Major cities: Ali Sabieh, Guelile

Highway system
- Transport in Djibouti

The RN-8 National Highway is a national highway in the southern of Djibouti. The highway is heavily traveled by Ethiopian trucks.
