= Denza Z9 =

Executive car

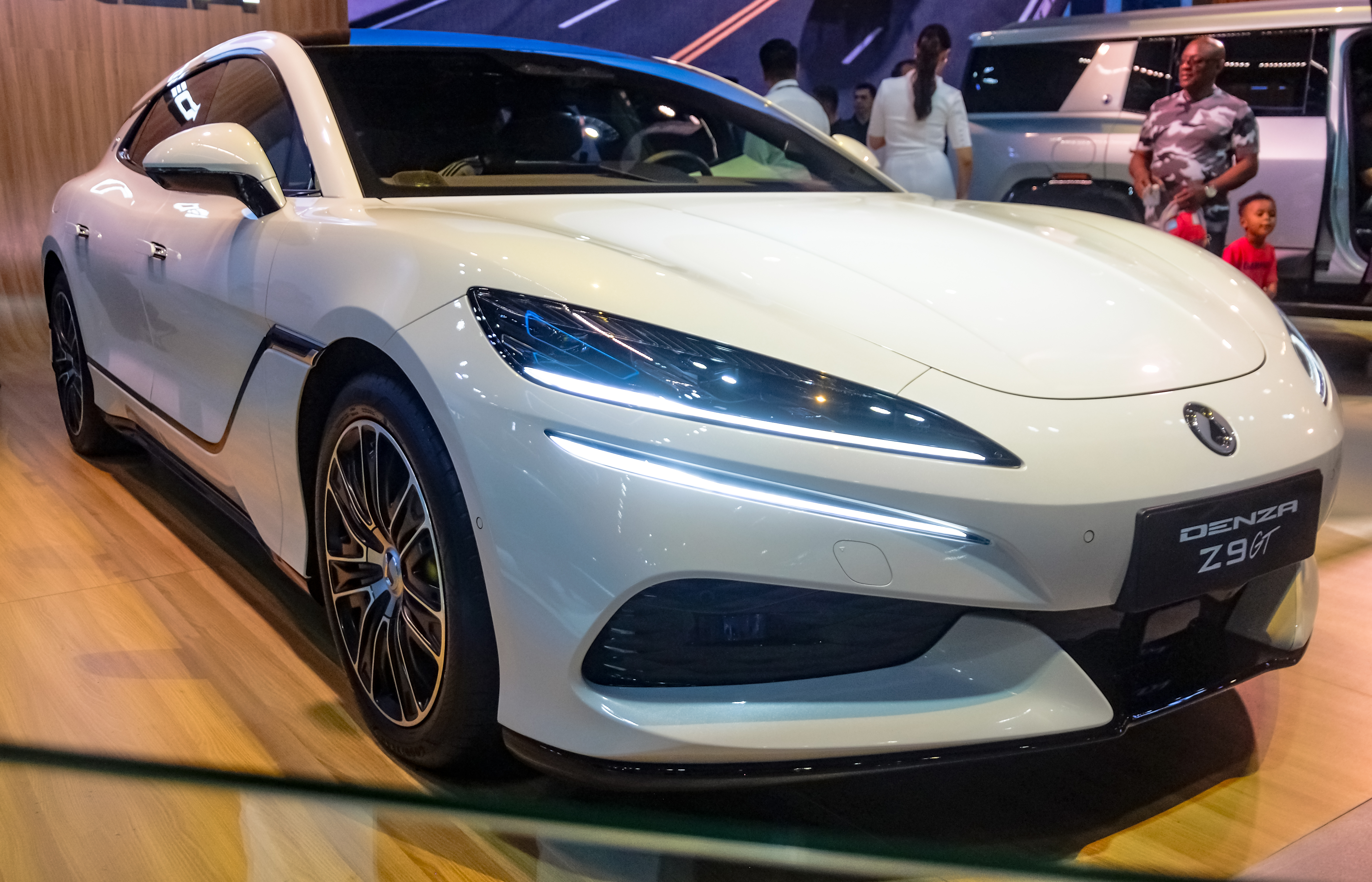
- Denza Z9 GT

Overview
- Manufacturer: BYD Auto
- Also called: Danza Z9 GT (Indonesia)
- Production: 2024–2026 (Z9); 2024–present (Z9 GT)
- Assembly: China: Shenzhen, Guangdong
- Designer: Under the lead of Wolfgang Egger

Body and chassis
- Class: Executive car (E)
- Body style: 4-door sedan; 5-door shooting brake (Z9 GT)
- Layout: Rear-motor, rear-wheel-drive (EV; since 2026); Triple-motor, all-wheel-drive (EV); Front-engine, triple-motor, all-wheel drive (PHEV)
- Platform: e^{3} platform
- Related: Denza Z9S; Denza N8L; Denza N9

Powertrain
- Engine: Petrol plug-in hybrid: 2.0 L BYD479ZQA I4 turbo
- Electric motor: AC permanent magnet synchronous
- Power output: 370–850 kW (503–1,156 PS; 496–1,140 hp) (EV); 640 kW (870 PS; 858 hp) (PHEV)
- Transmission: E-CVT (PHEV)
- Hybrid drivetrain: Plug-in hybrid
- Battery: EV: 100 kWh BYD Blade LFP (EV); 102.3 kWh Blade 2.0 LFP; 122.5 kWh Blade 2.0 LFP; PHEV: 38.5 kWh BYD Blade LFP (PHEV); 63.4 kWh Blade 2.0 LFP
- Electric range: 630–1,036 km (391–644 mi) (CLTC, EV); 701 km (436 mi) (NEDC, EV); 161–301 km (100–187 mi) (WLTP, PHEV); 201–401 km (125–249 mi) (CLTC, PHEV)
- Plug-in charging: 270–1100 kW DC (EV, standard model); 1500 kW DC (EV, GT model); 82 kW DC (PHEV); V2G: more than 300 kW

Dimensions
- Wheelbase: 3,125 mm (123.0 in)
- Length: 5,235 mm (206.1 in); 5,180–5,195 mm (203.9–204.5 in) (GT)
- Width: 1,990 mm (78.3 in)
- Height: 1,500–1,480 mm (59.1–58.3 in)
- Curb weight: 2,740–2,875 kg (6,041–6,338 lb)

Chronology
- Successor: Denza Z9S (Z9)

The Denza Z9 (Chinese: 腾势Z9; pinyin: Téngshì Z9) is a executive car marketed by Denza, a brand owned by Chinese manufacturer BYD Auto. Introduced in April 2024 at the Beijing Auto Show, the Z9 is available as a 5-door shooting brake or station wagon marketed as the Z9 GT, or a more traditional 4-door sedan, both of which are offered with plug-in hybrid and battery electric powertrain options.

== Overview ==
The Z9 was designed under the leadership of BYD's global design director, Wolfgang Egger.

According to a Denza executive, the Z9 GT targeted European competitors such as the Porsche Panamera and Mercedes-Benz S-Class. BYD teamed up with James Bond actor Daniel Craig and was first launched in the European market in April 2026.

The pricing was announced in China on 20 August 2024, and went on sale a month later. At the same time, Denza also introduced the three-box sedan version of the Z9, without the "GT" moniker. It is available with the same trim levels and price with the GT model.

Denza Z9 GT PEV (Plug-in EV, this is, both the plug-in hybrid and battery electric versions) are equipped with the Yi Sanfang system, which integrates three independent motors and dual-motor rear-wheel steering that offers improved vehicle handling. This system offers a rear-wheel steering angle of 20 degrees, considered "world-leading," and a minimum turning radius of 4.62 m (15.2 ft), along with a "crab-walk" capability at a 15-degree angle. The e³ tri-motor system also incorporates the DiSus-A intelligent air body control system with dual-chamber air suspension for improved stability. The Denza Z9 has achieved a moose test speed of 93.6 km/h (58 mph) and maintained a safe braking speed of 140 km/h (87 mph) during tire burst scenarios.

The cabin of the Denza Z9 includes two refrigerators: a 4-liter front fridge and a 10-liter rear fridge behind the rear seat armrest. Other features include a Devialet sound system and electrically adjustable second-row seats. The Denza Z9 features the BYD 9000 cockpit chip, which includes an AI model capable of handling tasks like scheduling and voice assistance. The Denza Z9's advanced driver-assistance system uses the BYD's BAS3.0+ system, which utilises 33 sensors and two Lidar units. These sensors enable functions like city and highway navigation, autonomous valet parking, and other autonomous driving features. This system is offered at no extra cost for the lifetime of the vehicle.

The Denza Z9 PHEV comes in Pro, Max, and Ultra trims. The Pro version lacks features such as air suspension, head-up display, and massage functions for second-row passengers, which are available in the Max trim. The Ultra trim adds electrically powered doors, Nappa leather seats, and 26 Devialet speakers. A Limited First Edition (LFE) of the PHEV model, limited to 2010 units, offers Max and Ultra trims with additional features like side-view cameras and 16 surround-view cameras.

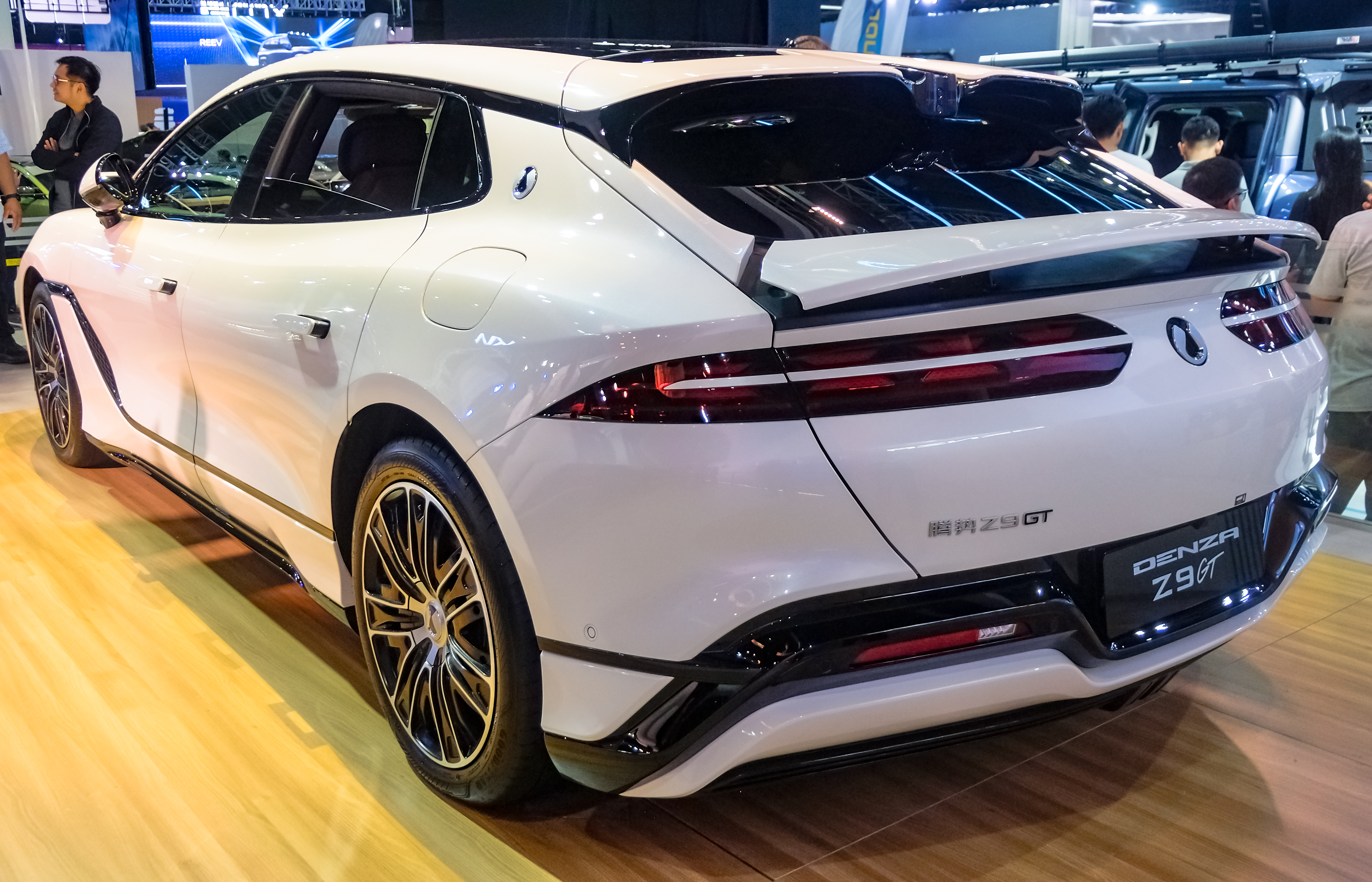
Rear view

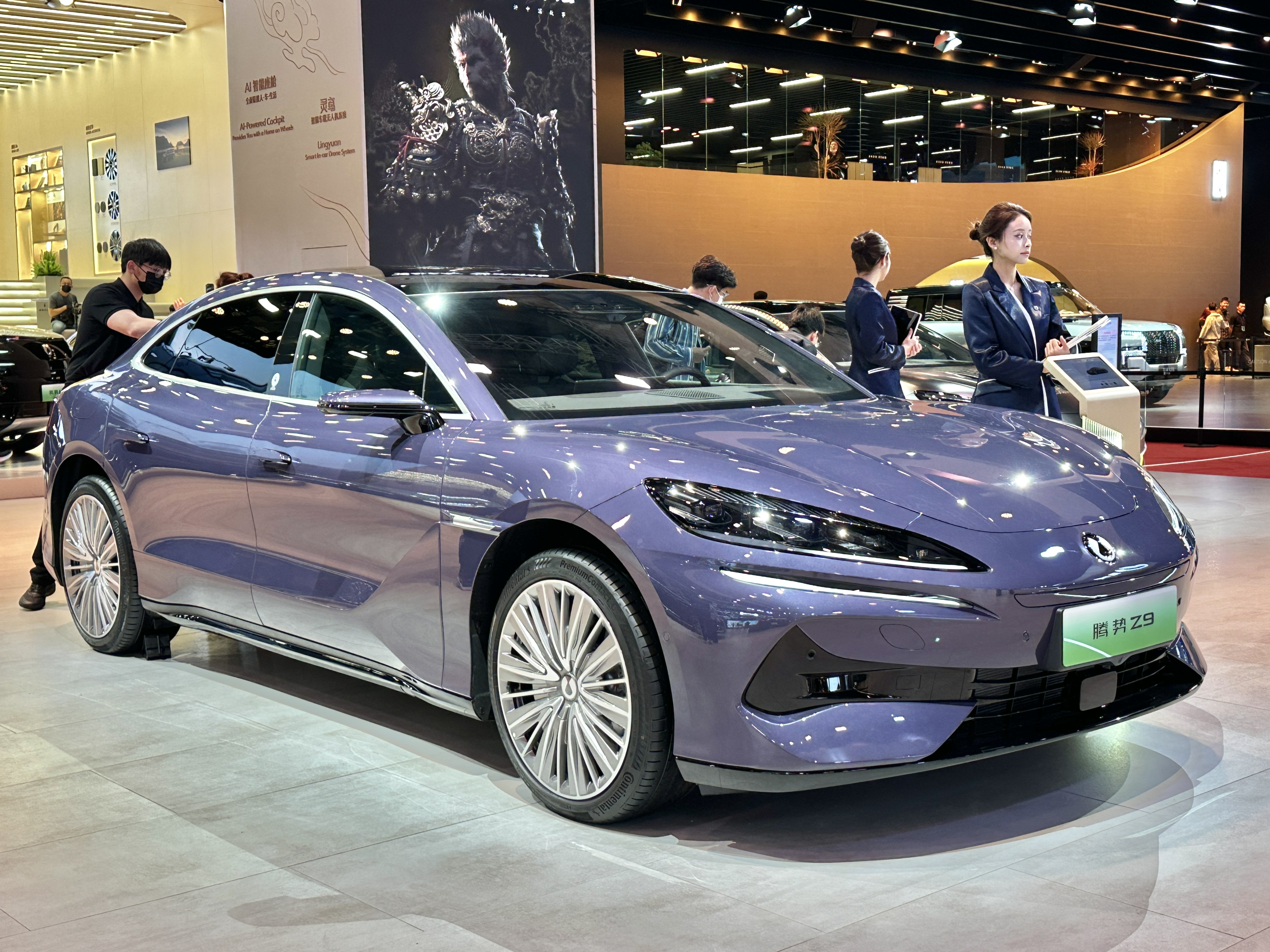
Denza Z9

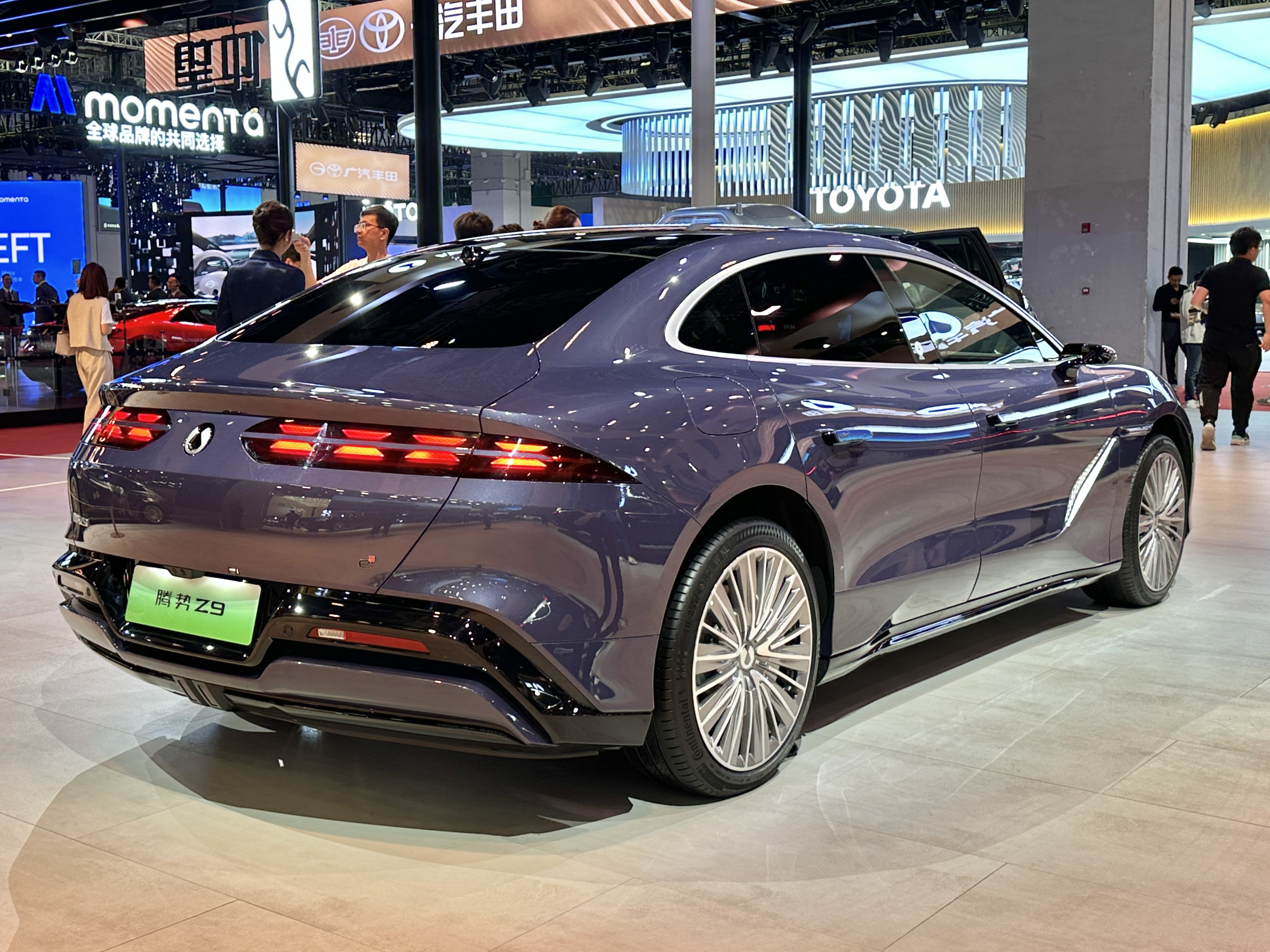
Rear view

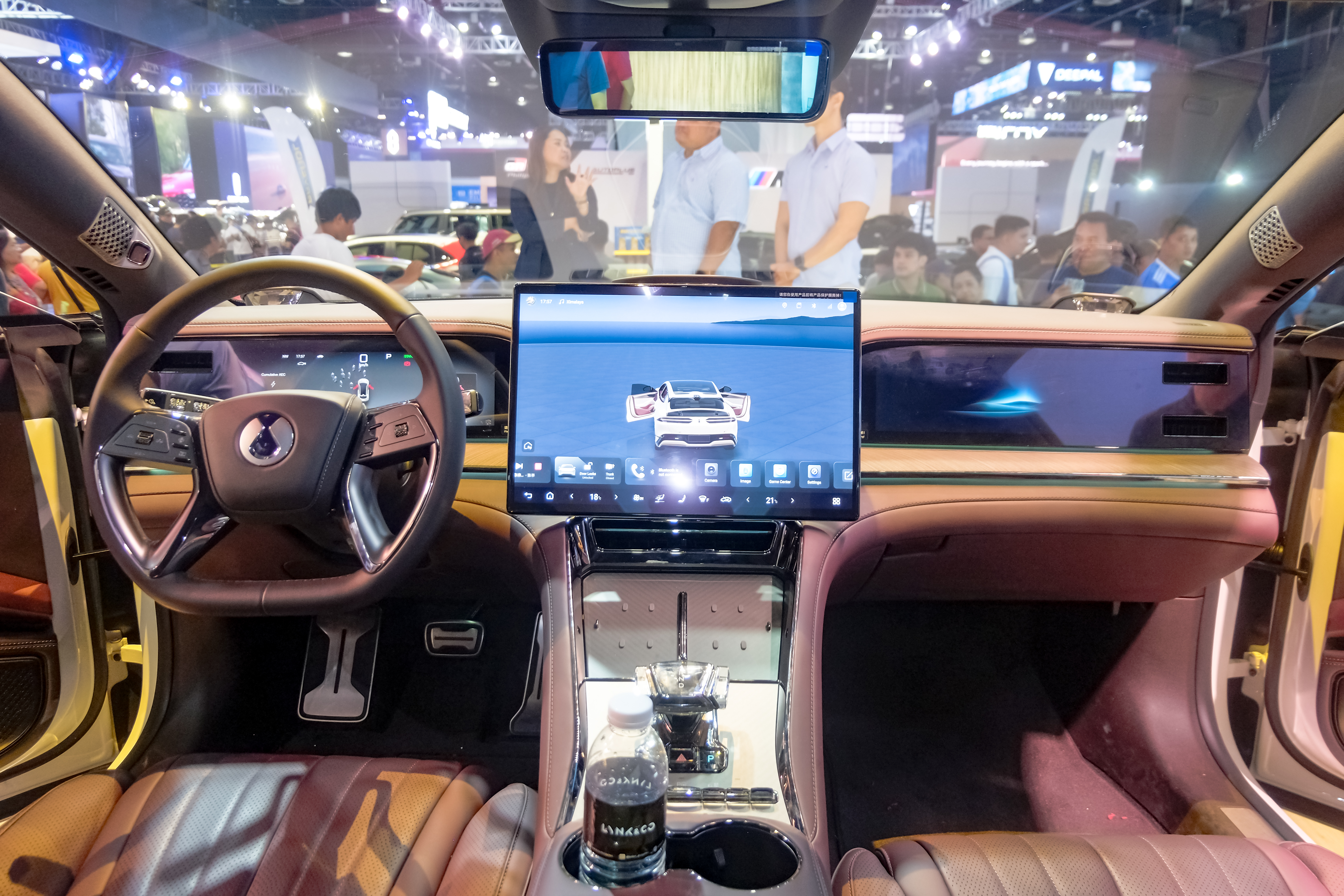
Interior

== Powertrain ==
The PHEV version of the Z9 is built on the e3 platform with the fifth-generation DM system, consisting of a 2.0-liter turbocharged petrol engine producing 150 kW (201 hp; 204 PS) net (152 kW (204 hp; 207 PS) gross) and three electric motors with a total output of 640 kW (858 hp; 870 PS). It accelerates from 0–100 km/h (0–62 mph) in 3.6 seconds, with a 38.5 kWh LFP battery providing a 201 km (125 mi) electric range and a total combined range of 1,100 km (684 mi). The Denza Z9 PHEV is BYD's first plug-in hybrid to feature CTB (cell-to-body) battery integration, which helps increase interior space and torsional rigidity.

The battery electric (BEV) version uses the e-Platform 3.0 Evo architecture and three electric motors for a combined output of 710 kW (952 hp; 965 PS), achieving 0–100 km/h (0–62 mph) in 3.4 seconds. The updated 2026 model year Denza Z9 GT BEV uses BYD's second-generation Blade Battery technology, with the top-spec 122 kWh pack rated at 600 km (373 mi) under WLTP. Charging is supported at up to 270 kW on conventional public chargers and up to 1 MW (1,000 kW) on the brand's dedicated Flash Charging stations, enabling a 10 to 70 percent charge in five minutes.

Specifications
Year	Battery		Power	Torque	Electric range (Z9GT)			DCFC	Kerb weight
Year	Type	Weight	Power	Torque	WLTP	NEDC	CLTC	Peak kW	Kerb weight
PHEV
2024	38.5 kWh Blade LFP	342 kg (754 lb)	858 hp (640 kW; 870 PS)	1,035 N⋅m (763 lb⋅ft)	161 km (100 mi)		201 km (125 mi)	82 kW	2,740 kg (6,041 lb)
2026	63.8 kWh Blade 2.0 LFP	475 kg (1,047 lb)	858 hp (640 kW; 870 PS)	1,035 N⋅m (763 lb⋅ft)	301 km (187 mi)		401 km (249 mi)		2,810 kg (6,195 lb)
EV
2024	100 kWh Blade LFP	700 kg (1,543 lb)	952 hp (710 kW; 965 PS)	1,150 N⋅m (848 lb⋅ft)			630 km (391 mi)	270 kW	2,875 kg (6,338 lb)
2026	102.3 kWh LFP	725.9 kg (1,600 lb)	496 hp (370 kW; 503 PS)	500 N⋅m (369 lb⋅ft)			880 km (547 mi)		2,540 kg (5,600 lb)
2026	122.5 kWh LFP	862.4 kg (1,901 lb)	496 hp (370 kW; 503 PS)	500 N⋅m (369 lb⋅ft)			1,036 km (644 mi)	1100 kW	2,700 kg (5,952 lb)
2026	122.5 kWh LFP	862.4 kg (1,901 lb)	1,140 hp (850 kW; 1,156 PS)	1,210 N⋅m (892 lb⋅ft)	599 km (372 mi)	701 km (436 mi)	820 km (510 mi)	1100 kW	2,895 kg (6,382 lb)

== Markets ==
=== Europe ===
The Denza Z9 GT made its European debut in April 2026, it is available in plug-in hybrid and battery electric versions. It is the first continent outside China to debut the Z9 GT.

=== Indonesia ===
The Danza Z9 GT was launched in Indonesia on 14 October 2026, along with the locally assembled D9. It is available with the battery electric version in the sole unnamed variant.

=== Malaysia ===
The Denza Z9 GT was launched in Malaysia on 15 July 2026, for the battery electric version solely available in the Premium trim. It is also the Asia-Pacific debut of the Z9 GT after Europe, and first Asia-Pacific country to debut the Z9 GT.

=== Thailand ===
The Denza Z9 GT was launched in Thailand on 16 September 2026, for the battery electric version solely available in the Performance AWD variant.

=== India ===
In November 2026, BYD's luxury sub-brand Denza officially entered the Indian market with the launch of the all-electric Denza Z9 GT shooting brake, priced at ₹1.57 crore (ex-showroom) alongside the Denza D9 MPV.

== Sales ==
Year	China				
Year	Z9		Z9 GT		Total
Year	PHEV	EV	PHEV	EV	Total
2024	1,300	59	8,253	1,155	10,767
2025	1,922	375	5,448	953	8,698
