= Denza N9 =

Full-size SUV

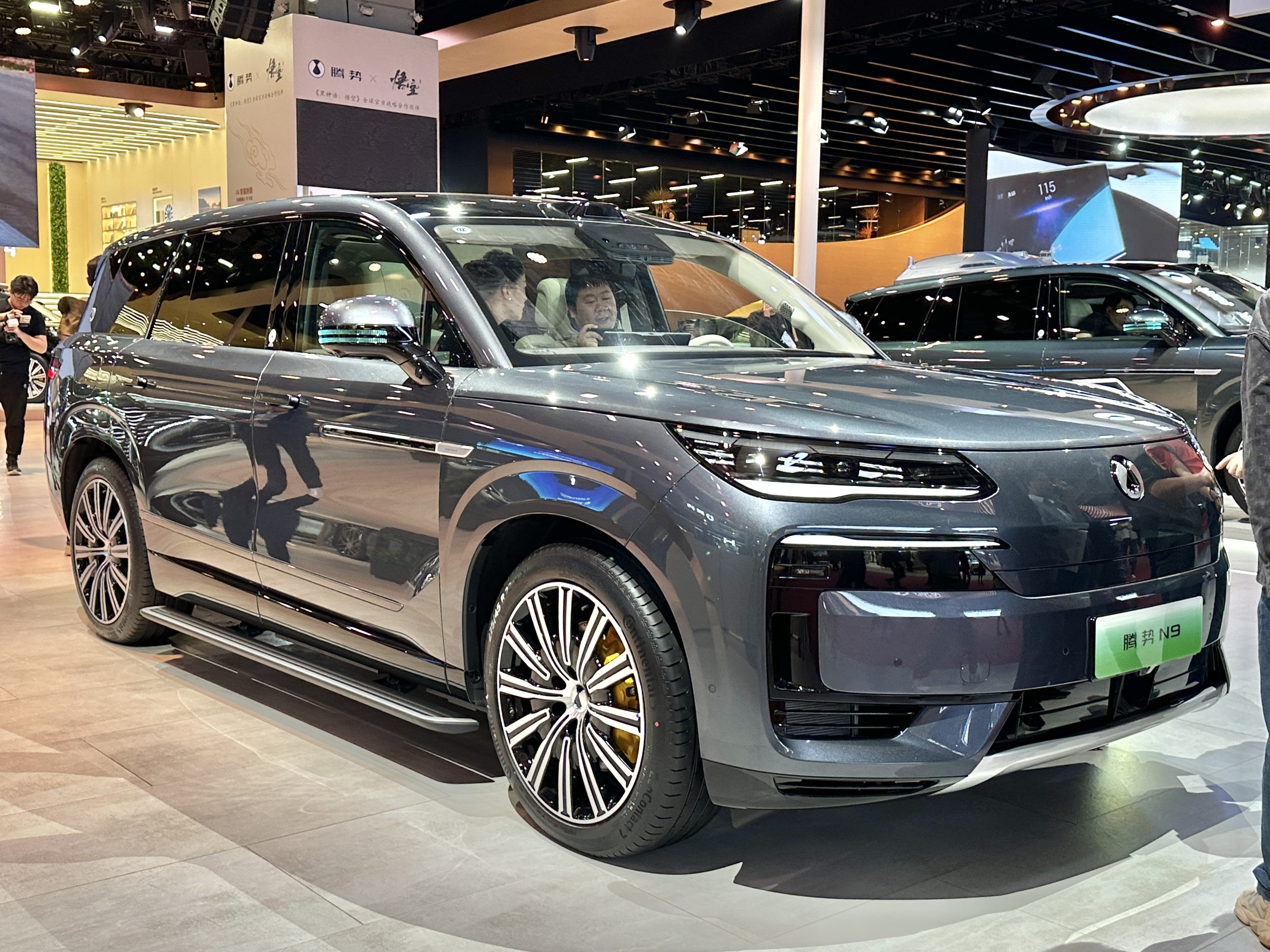

Overview
- Manufacturer: Denza (BYD Auto)
- Production: February 2025 – present
- Assembly: China: Jinan, Shandong
- Designer: Under the lead of Wolfgang Egger

Body and chassis
- Class: Full-size SUV
- Body style: 5-door SUV
- Layout: Front-engine, tri-motor, all-wheel-drive
- Platform: e^{3} platform
- Related: Denza N8L; Denza Z9; BYD Datang; BYD Sealion 08

Powertrain
- Engine: Petrol plug-in hybrid: 2.0 L BYD479ZQA I4 turbo
- Electric motor: Permanent magnet synchronous
- Hybrid drivetrain: Plug-in hybrid (N9 PHEV)
- Battery: 46.9 kWh BYD Blade LFP (PHEV)

Dimensions
- Wheelbase: 3,125 mm (123.0 in)
- Length: 5,258 mm (207.0 in)
- Width: 2,030 mm (79.9 in)
- Height: 1,830 mm (72.0 in)
- Curb weight: 3,130–3,245 kg (6,900–7,154 lb)

The Denza N9 (Chinese: 腾势N9; pinyin: Téngshì N9) is a three-row six-seater full-size SUV marketed by Denza, a brand owned by Chinese manufacturer BYD Auto.

== Overview ==
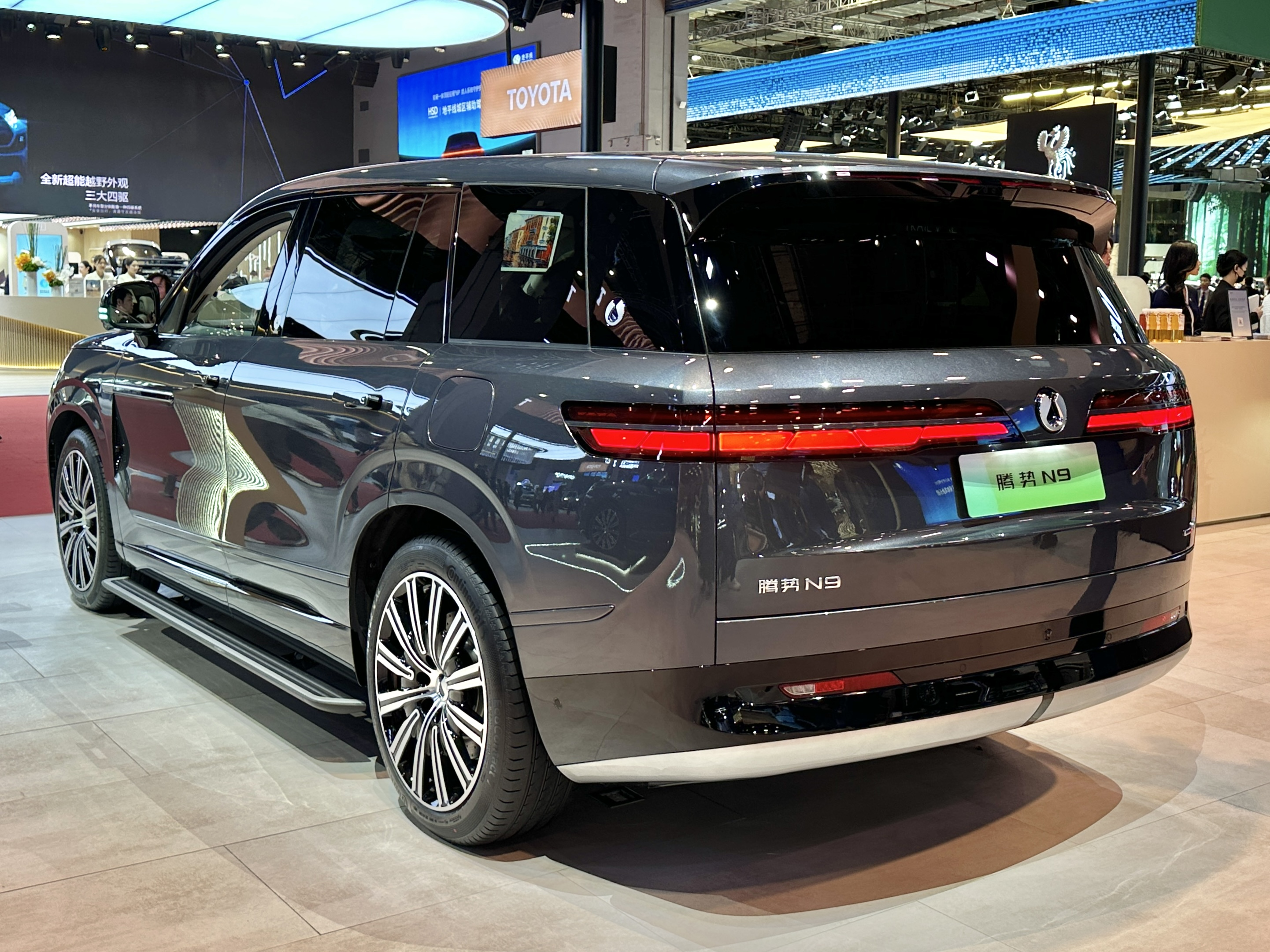
Denza N9 rear

The Denza N9 debuted on 15 November 2024 at the 22nd Auto Guangzhou. Denza opened pre-orders for the N9 on 21 February 2025 and went on sale in 21 March 2025.

The N9 measures 5,258 mm (207.0 in) long, 2,030 mm (79.9 in) wide, and 1,830 mm (72.0 in) tall, and has a wheelbase of 3,125 mm (123.0 in). It has three rows with two seats each, for a total of six seats. It is equipped with the DiSus-A air suspension, and the God's Eye B DiPilot 300 driving assistance system.

== Powertrain ==
=== N9 EV ===
The N9 EV will have a three-motor setup and slightly more powerful motors, with a total output of 710 kW (952 hp; 965 PS).

=== N9 PHEV ===
Powering the N9 PHEV is a 200 kW TZ210XYD on the front axle and a 240 kW TZ220XYAM electric motor powering each of the rear wheels for a total power output of 680 kW (910 hp; 920 PS). There is also a 2.0-litre turbocharged BYD479ZQA petrol engine that can deliver up to 152 kW (204 hp; 207 PS) of power. Battery power comes from a 47 kWh lithium iron phosphate blade battery pack, which can give a pure electric range of 165 kilometres (103 mi), and 1,300 kilometres (810 mi) of combined range. Top speed for the car is 230 km/h (143 mph).

== Sales ==
Two months after launching on 21 March 2025, Denza announced the 10,000th N9 rolled off the production line on 21 May, 5,018 of which were sold in April.

Year	China
2025	21,834
