= Small nucleolar RNA sR8 =

World of history

sR8
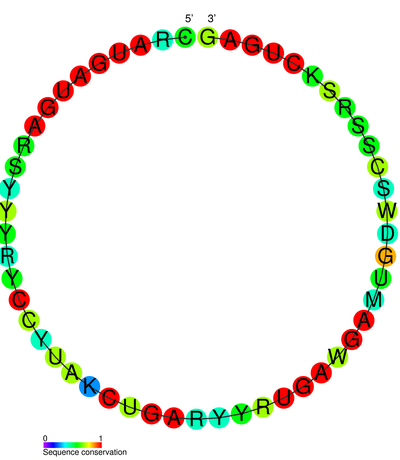
- sR8 consensus sequence

Identifiers
- Symbol: sR8
- Rfam: RF01311

Other data
- RNA type: snoRNA; CD-box
- Domain(s): Sulfolobaceae, Thermococcaceae
- PDB structures: PDBe

In molecular biology, Small nucleolar RNA sR8 is a non-coding RNA belonging to the C/D box class of snoRNAs. sR8, along with other C/D box snoRNAs, performs 2′-O-methylation of ribose on a target strand of ribosomal RNA. Targeting is achieved through the C and D box components, which are short sections of conserved sequences, as well as C'/D' boxes (internal equivalents of the C and D boxes). These sequences base-pair with nucleotides in the target rRNA to direct their methylation.

sR8 RNA operates alongside protein components in a ribonucleoprotein (RNP) complex. sR8 is able to guide the methylation of targets found within structured stem-loops, which implies that a component of the complex is able to unwind such structures.

== As a model system ==
sR8 is considered a 'model' C/D box sRNA and has been used in several experiments investigating the nature of C/D box snoRNAs and ribonucleoprotein complexes. It is particularly useful in studies because the RNP can be entirely constructed in vitro.

sR8 RNA from the hyperthermophile Methanocaldococcus jannaschii has been used to elucide the 3-dimensional structure of a C/D box RNP. The structure was unexpectedly found to be dimeric, wherein two RNA molecules bind with several proteins in the same complex.
