= 8A =

8A, VIII-A or 8a may refer to:

- Aisle 8A, the 64th episode of the animated situation comedy King of the Hill
- Bone morphogenetic protein 8A in biochemistry
- Cyg OB2 -8A, a blue star
- Greek National Road 8A
- GCR Class 8A, a class of British 0-8-0 steam locomotive
- Isotta Fraschini Tipo 8A, a successor to the Tipo 8 model car
- Kintetsu 8A series, a Japanese electric multiple unit train type
- Massachusetts Route 8A
- Nevada State Route 8A
- Secondary State Highway 8A (Washington)
- Stalag VIII-A, a German prisoners of war camp

and also :

- Atlas Blue IATA airline designator
- 8(a) Business Development Program a loan program administered by the U.S. Small Business Administration

== See also ==
- A8 (disambiguation)
