= A8(M) motorway =

A8(M) motorway may refer to:

- A8(M) motorway (Northern Ireland)
- A8(M) motorway (Scotland)
