= Minami-Fukui Freight Terminal =

Minami-Fukui Freight Terminal 南福井駅
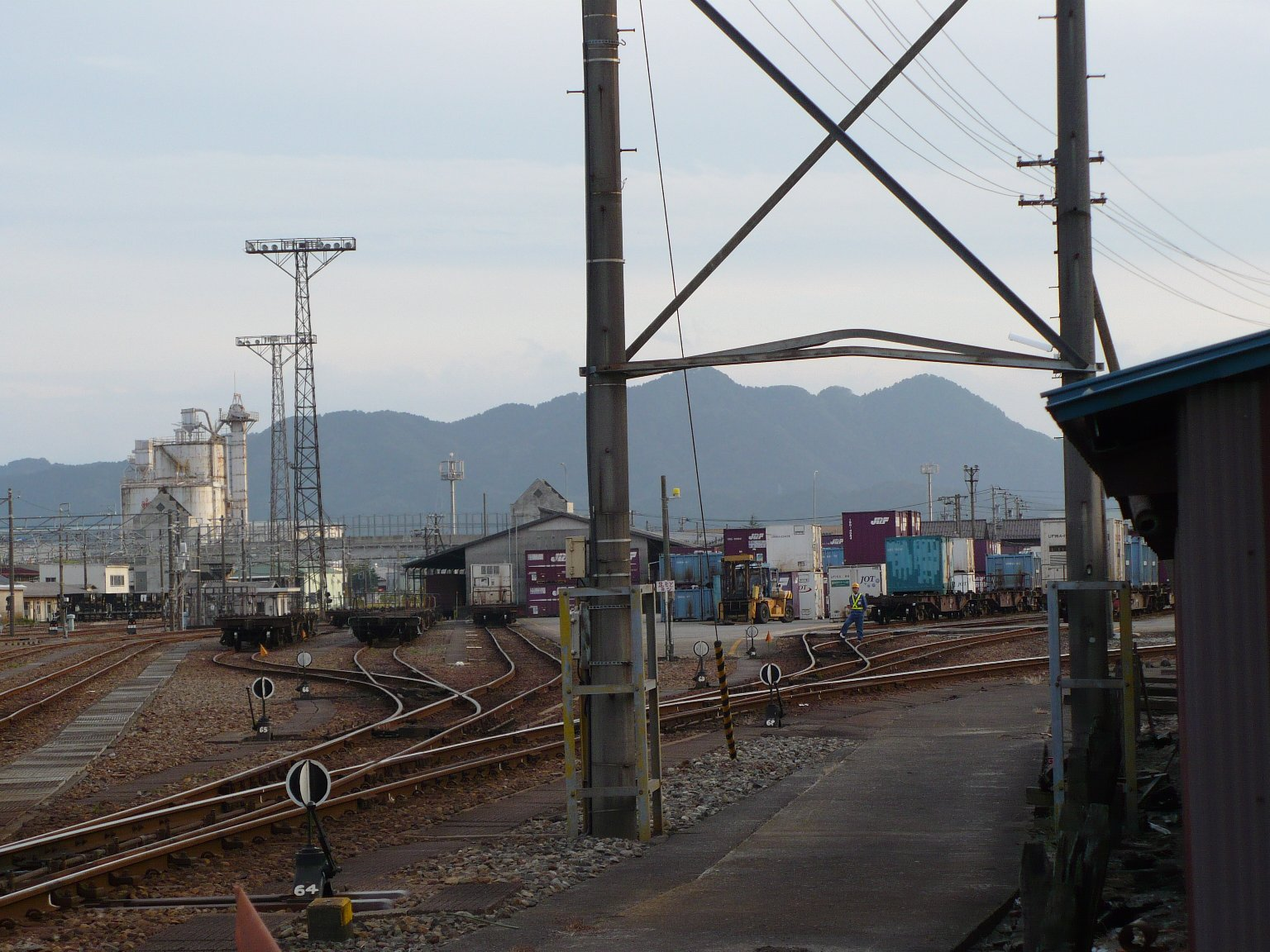
- Minami Fukui station cargo handling tracks

General information
- Location: 1-9-3 Tsukimi, Fukui-shi, Fukui-ken, 918-8012; Japan
- Coordinates: 36°02′43″N 136°13′03″E
- Operator: Japan Freight Railway Company
- Line: ■ Hapi-Line Fukui Line
- Distance: 98.1 km from Maibara

History
- Opened: December 1, 1952
Location
- Location within Japan

Minami-Fukui Freight Terminal (南福井駅, Minamifukui-eki) is a railway freight terminal in the city of Fukui, Japan. It is located on the Hokuriku Main Line between Echizen-Hanandō and Fukui Stations. It is operated by Japan Freight Railway Company (JR Freight). The Fukui yard opened in December 140 and the terminal was opened on December 1, 1952.

== Surrounding area ==
- Taiheiyo Cement - Fukui Service Station
- Sumitomo-Osaka Cement - Minami-Fukui Service Station

== See also ==
- List of railway stations in Japan
