= State Highway 8 (Madhya Pradesh) =

State highway in Madhya Pradesh, India

State Highway 8

Major junctions
- North end: Budhar
- Darrikherwa, Rajendragram, Pushprajgarh, Nonghati
- South end: Amarkantak (Chhattisgarh border)

Location
- Country: India
- State: Madhya Pradesh

Highway system
- Roads in India; Expressways; National; State; Asian; State Highways in Madhya Pradesh

Madhya Pradesh State Highway 8 (MP SH 8) is a State Highway running from Budhar town in Shahdol distinct via Darrikherwa, Rajendragram, Pushprajgarh, Nonghati and ultimately terminates at Amarkantak near the Madhya Pradesh - Chhattisgarh state border.

It connects the religious and tourist town of Amarkantak.

== See also ==
- List of state highways in Madhya Pradesh
