= List of N8 roads =

This is a list of roads designated N8. The entries are sorted in alphabetical order by country name.

- N8 (Bangladesh)
- N8 road (Belgium), a road connecting Brussels and Koksijde
- N8 road (France)
- N8 road (Ireland)
- N8 road (Luxembourg)
- N8 road (Netherlands)
- N8 road (South Africa), a road connecting Upington, Kimberley, Bloemfontein and the Lesotho border
- N8 road (Switzerland)
- Nebraska Highway 8, a state highway in the U.S. state of Nebraska
