= Nishi-Sabae Station =

Railway station in Sabae, Fukui prefecture, Japan

Nishi-Sabae Station 西鯖江駅
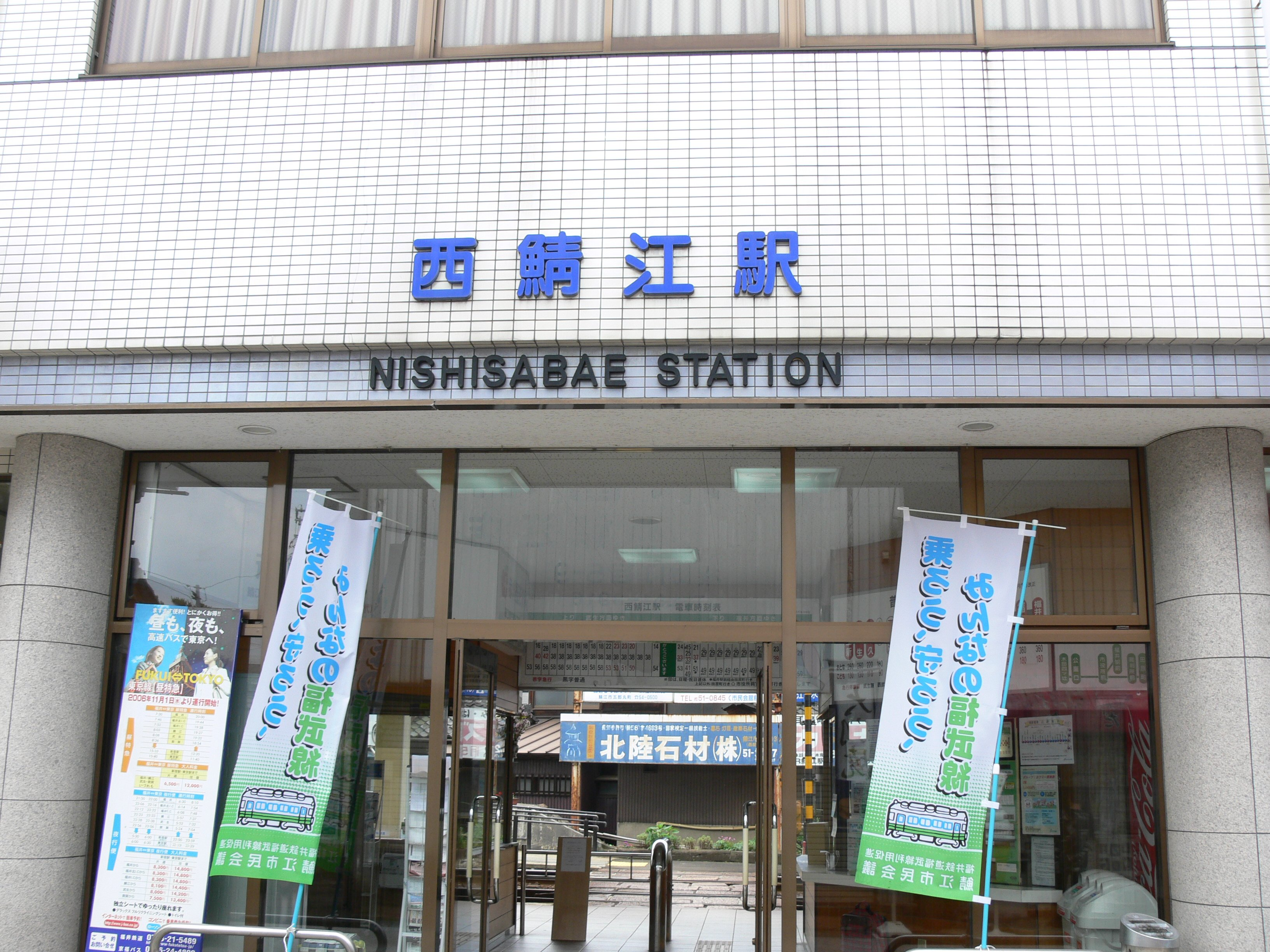
- Nishi-Sabae Station entrance

General information
- Location: 2-4-14 Sakura-machi, Sabae-shi, Fukui-ken 916-0027; Japan
- Coordinates: 35°56′47″N 136°10′54″E
- Operator: Fukui Railway
- Line: ■ Fukubu Line
- Distance: 5.3 km from Takefu-shin
- Platforms: 2 side platforms
- Tracks: 2
- Connections

Other information
- Status: Staffed
- Station code: F5
- Website: Official website

History
- Opened: February 23, 1924

Passengers
- FY2015: 348
Location
- Location within Japan

Nishi-Sabae Station (西鯖江駅, Nishi-sabae-eki) is a Fukui Railway Fukubu Line railway station located in the city of Sabae, Fukui Prefecture, Japan.

== Lines ==
Nishi-Sabae Station is served by the Fukui Railway Fukubu Line, and is located 5.3 kilometers from the terminus of the line at Takefu-shin.

== Station layout ==
The station consists of two ground-level opposed side platforms connected by a level crossing. The station is staffed.

== Adjacent stations ==
| « | Service | » |
Fukui Railway Fukubu Line
| Iehisa | Express | Mizuochi |
| Sundome Nishi | Local | Nishiyama-Kōen |

== History ==
The station opened on February 23, 1924. The original wooden station building was replaced by concrete structure in September 1995.

== Passenger statistics ==
In fiscal 2015, the station was used by an average of 348 passengers daily (boarding passengers only).

== Surrounding area ==
- There is a taxi stand and a Sabae Community Bus stop outside the station's north exit.
- Directly across the street is the Sabae City Hotel.
- To the north (uphill): Nishiyama Zoo and Nishiyama Park.
- To the east: Sabae Chamber of Commerce and Industry (鯖江商工会館) and Jōshōji Temple.
- Sabae Station on the JR West Hokuriku Main Line is located approximately 800 meters to the east.

== See also ==
- List of railway stations in Japan
