= Ōshio Station =

Ōshio Station is the name of two train stations in Japan:

- Ōshio Station (Fukui) (王子保駅)
- Ōshio Station (Hyogo) (大塩駅)
