= Mizuochi =

Mizuochi (written: 水落) is a Japanese surname. Notable people with the surname include:

- Honami Mizuochi (水落 穂南, born 1993), Japanese weightlifter
- Toshiei Mizuochi (水落 敏栄, born 1943), Japanese politician

== See also ==
- Mizuochi Station, a railway station in Sabae, Fukui Prefecture, Japan
