= Iehisa =

- Gender: Male

Origin
- Origin: Japanese
- Meaning: Different meanings depending on the kanji used

Iehisa (written: 家久) is a masculine Japanese given name. Notable people with the name include:

- Konoe Iehisa (近衛 家久) (1687–1737), Japanese kugyō
- Shimazu Iehisa (島津 家久) (1547–1587), Japanese samurai

== See also ==
- Iehisa Station (家久駅, Iehisa-eki), train station in Echizen, Fukui Prefecture, Japan
