= Echizen-Fuchū Castle =

Echizen-Fuchū Castle 越前府中城
- Echizen, Fukui Prefecture, Japan

Site information
- Type: Japanese castle
- Open to the public: yes
- Condition: Ruins

Location
- Coordinates: 35°54′13″N 136°10′08″E

Site history
- In use: Sengoku period

Echizen-Fuchū Castle (越前府中城, Echizen-Fuchū-jō) was a flatland-style Japanese castle located in what is now part of the city of Echizen, Fukui Prefecture, Japan. The castle fell into ruins during the Sengoku period and the site was completely built over in the modern era, so nothing remains today.

== History ==
By its name, the original Echizen-Fuchū Castle is thought to have been built on the "Fuchū", or site of the Nara period provincial capital of Echizen Province. This fortified residence was subsequently used by the Shugo, or military governors of the province in the Heian through Kamakura period. However, with the rise of the Asakura clan to power, the center of government for Echizen Province shifted to Ichijōdani, and the Asakura appointed a local magistrate who resided at Fuchū.

During the Sengoku period, Oda Nobunaga invaded and conquered the province and crushed the Ikkō-ikki movement. Afterwards, Echizen was divided between three of his generals: Fuwa Mitsuharu, Sassa Narimasa, and Maeda Toshiie, with Maeda Toshiie rebuilding Echizen-Fuchū Castle in 1575. Maeda Toshiie used the nearby Hino River to create a double system of moats around the castle, with a width of 180 meters north-south and 100 meters east-west. Maeda Toshiie was subsequently transferred to Noto Province, but Echizen-Fuchū was retained by his son, Maeda Toshinaga as the center of a 100,000 koku domain until he was transferred to Kaga Province after the Battle of Shizugatake and the castle was awarded to Niwa Nagahide instead.

Following the Battle of Sekigahara, all of Echizen Province was awarded to Tokugawa Ieyasu's second son, Yūki Hideyasu as Fukui Domain. Yūki Hideyasu established his seat at Fukui Castle and installed his retainer, Honda Tomimasa as castellan of Echizen-Fuchū. Honda renovated the castle, building a two-story donjon, a residence, tea house, and other structures.

After the Meiji Restoration, the moat was filled in and the main gate was moved to the Jodo temple of Shokaku-ji about 250 meters to the west, where it may be seen today. The castle site became the location of an elementary school. Subsequently, the castle site was completely destroyed when the Takefu city office was constructed after WWII. A complete archaeological excavation was conducted in 2016 and 2017 in the course of razing the city's central Culture Hall and nearby Kominkan (community hall) in order to rebuild the city hall on the same lot occupied since postwar. Pre-Edo period materials were documented in the northwest corner of the lot. The castle itself exhibited traces of a formal garden and water features, and much of the stone-faced inner moat defense along the east margin of the lot. Partly in reaction to a vigorous protest by local citizens seeking the conservation of this rare example of castle construction, the city pledged to document each stone removed from the wall so that a section could be reconstituted as a cultural feature on the grounds of the new city hall forecourt.
