= Oshio =

Oshio may refer to:

- Oshio Station (Fukui)
- Japanese destroyer Oshio
- Ōshio Kenji, a Japanese former sumo wrestler
- Kotaro Oshio, a Japanese acoustic guitarist
- Manabu Oshio, Japanese singer and actor
