= Tokuzō =

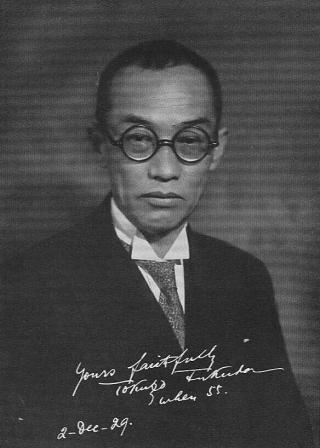
- Tokuzo Fukuda (1874–1930), Japanese economist
- Pronunciation: tokɯdzoɯ (IPA)
- Gender: Male

Origin
- Origin: Japanese
- Meaning: Different meanings depending on the kanji used

Other names
- Alternative spelling: Tokuzo (Kunrei-shiki) Tokuzo (Nihon-shiki) Tokuzō, Tokuzo, Tokuzou, Tokuzoh (Hepburn)

Tokuzō is a masculine Japanese given name.

== Written forms ==
Tokuzō can be written using different combinations of kanji characters. Some examples:

- 徳三, "benevolence, three"
- 徳蔵, "benevolence, store up"
- 徳造, "benevolence, create"
- 得三, "gain, three"
- 得蔵, "gain, store up"
- 得造, "gain, create"
- 篤三, "sincere, three"
- 竺三, "bamboo, three"
- 啄三, "peck, three"
- 登久三, "climb up, long time, three"

The name can also be written in hiragana とくぞう or katakana トクゾウ.

== Notable people with the name ==
- Tokuzō Akiyama (秋山 徳蔵; 1888–1974), Japanese chef
- Tokuzō Fukuda (福田 徳三; 1874–1930), Japanese economist
- Tokuzō Tanaka (田中 徳三; 1920–2007), Japanese film director
