= Echizen, Fukui =

Echizen 越前市
- City
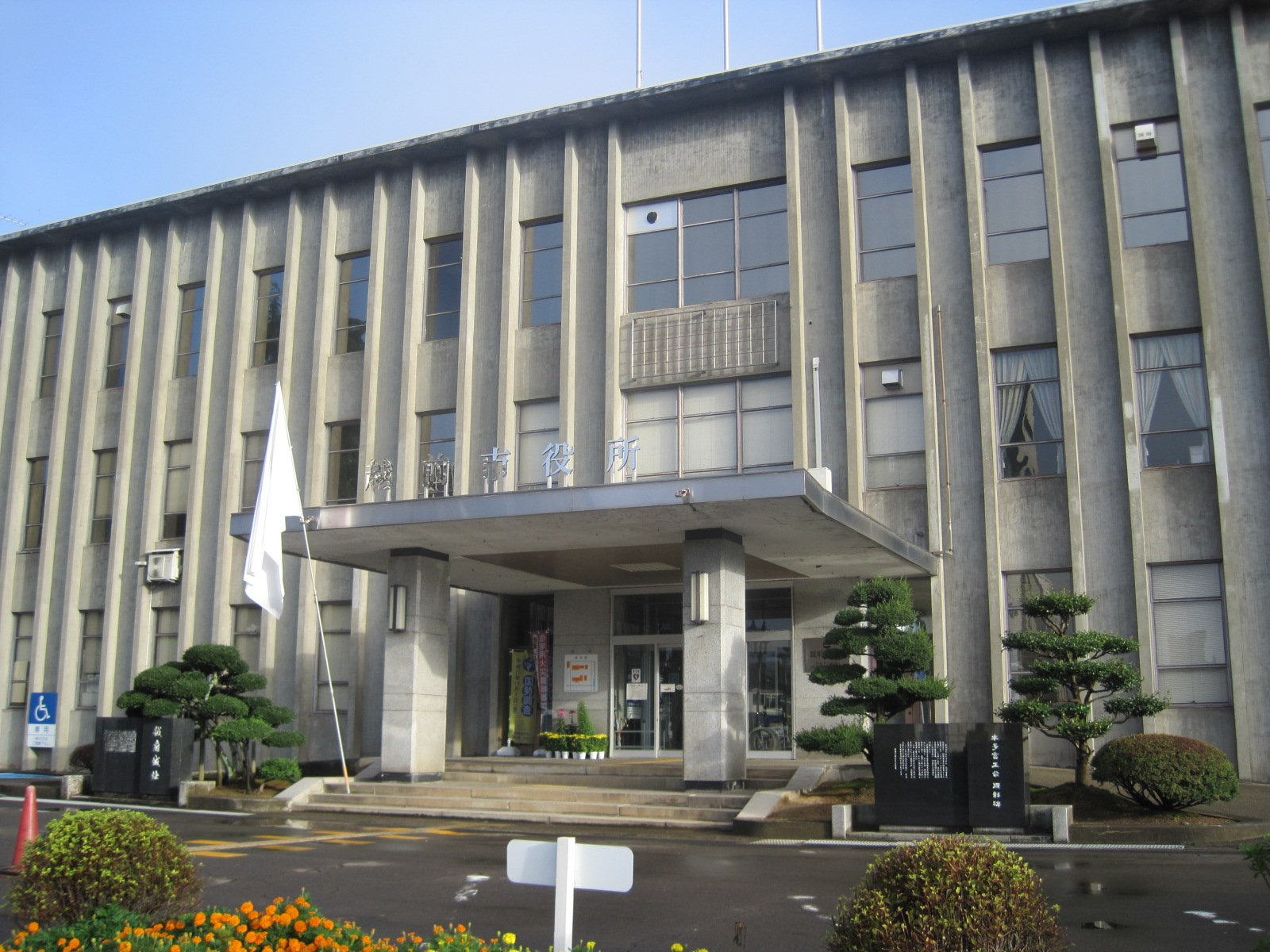
- Echizen City Hall

- Flag Seal

- Location of Echizen in Fukui Prefecture

- Coordinates: 35°54′12.6″N 136°10′7.5″E
- Country: Japan
- Region: Chūbu (Hokuriku)
- Prefecture: Fukui
- As city settled for Takefu: April 1, 1948
- As merged with Imadate town and current city name for: October 1, 2005

Government
  - Mayor: Tōru Hirabayashi (平林透) - from February 2026

Area
  - Total: 230.70 km^{2} (89.07 sq mi)

Population (2020)
  - Total: 80,611
  - Density: 349.42/km^{2} (904.99/sq mi)
- Time zone: UTC+9 (Japan Standard Time)
  - Tree: Cherry blossom
  - Flower: Chrysanthemum
- Phone number: 0778-22-3000
- Address: 1-13-7 Fuchu, Echizen-shi, Fukui-ken 915-8530
- Website: Official website

Echizen (越前市, Echizen-shi; Japanese pronunciation: [è̞.c̟͡ɕí.(d͡)zè̞ɴ̀, -(d͡)zé̞ɰ̃̀.ɕì]) is a city located in Fukui Prefecture, Japan. As of 1 July 2018, the city had an estimated population of 83,078 in 20,341 households and a population density of 360 persons per km^{2}. The total area of the city was 230.70 square kilometres (89.07 sq mi). The modern city of Echizen was established on October 1, 2005, from the merger of the city of Takefu and the town of Imadate (from Imadate District); although the Echizen Basin has been an important regional center for over 1,500 years. The city is home to the largest number of cultural assets in Fukui Prefecture and has many former castle sites and prehistoric archeological sites.

== Geography ==
Echizen is located in central Fukui Prefecture, bordered by mountains on three sides.

=== Neighbouring municipalities ===
- Fukui Prefecture
  - Echizen (town)
  - Fukui
  - Ikeda
  - Minamiechizen
  - Sabae

=== Climate ===
Echizen has a humid climate (Köppen Cfa) influenced by its proximity to the Sea of Japan, and is characterized by warm, wet summers and cold winters with heavy snowfall. The average annual temperature in Echizen is 13.4 °C. The average annual rainfall is 2,325 mm with September as the wettest month. The temperatures are highest on average in August, at around 25.2 °C, and lowest in January, at around 2.1 °C.

== Demographics ==
Per Japanese census data, the population peaked around the year 2000 and has declined since.

Historical population
Year	Pop.	±%
1970	76,720	—
1980	81,942	+6.8%
1990	84,897	+3.6%
2000	87,699	+3.3%
2010	85,614	−2.4%
2020	80,611	−5.8%

== History ==
=== Pre-modern history ===
Echizen is part of ancient Echizen Province, and was the location of the provincial capital and provincial temple of the province from the Nara period onwards. During the Nanboku-chō period, a number of battles were fought, and numerous castles were built during this time. Shiba Takatsune, who supported the Northern during the war, fought with Yoshisada Nitta in the Battle of the Hino River. Shiba lost the battle, and fled north to Asuwa Castle in Fukui. Nitta pursued him but was defeated and killed at the Sieges of Kuromaru. Shiba returned to Echizen-Fuchū and conquered both Fuchū Castle and Ōtaki Castle. The outcome of the war between the Northern and the Southern Courts was decided around Echizen. Today a plaque marking the site of Shinzenkōji Castle can be seen at Shōgaku-ji temple in Echizen, and remains of other castles can be found throughout the city. In the Sengoku period, the area prospered under the leadership of the Asakura clan, based at Ichijōdani, near modern Fukui city. The Asakura were defeated by Oda Nobunaga, who divided the area among his generals Fuwa Mitsuharu, Sassa Narimasa, and Maeda Toshiie. Part of Sassa Narimasa's castle, Komaru Castle, still stands today. Maeda Toshiie took residence in Echizen-Fuchū Castle, on the current location of the Echizen city hall. Fuwa Mitsuharu took charge of Ryūmon-ji Castle, whose stone foundations and parts of the moat can be seen today at Ryūmon-ji temple.

After the Battle of Sekigahara, the victorious Tokugawa Ieyasu awarded all of Echizen Province to his second son, Yūki Hideyasu, who ruled what became Fukui Domain from Fukui Castle. He changed his name to Matsudaira, and the Matsudaira remained in control of the area until the end of the Edo period.

At the start of Fukui Domain, Honda Tomimasa, highly trusted by Tokugawa Ieyasu, was appointed as Hideyasu's karō. Honda received a small piece of land and became governor of Echizen-Fuchū. Devastated by years of war, Echizen-Fuchū had lost its castles, roads, and buildings, and Honda is responsible for a major reconstruction of the area. He rebuilt the roads, walls, and buildings, as well as irrigation systems connected to the Hino river. Honda started the industries that still make up Echizen's base economy: blades, textiles, and industrial machinery. The Honda clan ruled the Echizen-Fuchū area for nine generations, until the Meiji Restoration. Their graves can be seen at the temple of Ryūsen-ji in Echizen.

=== Modern Echizen city ===
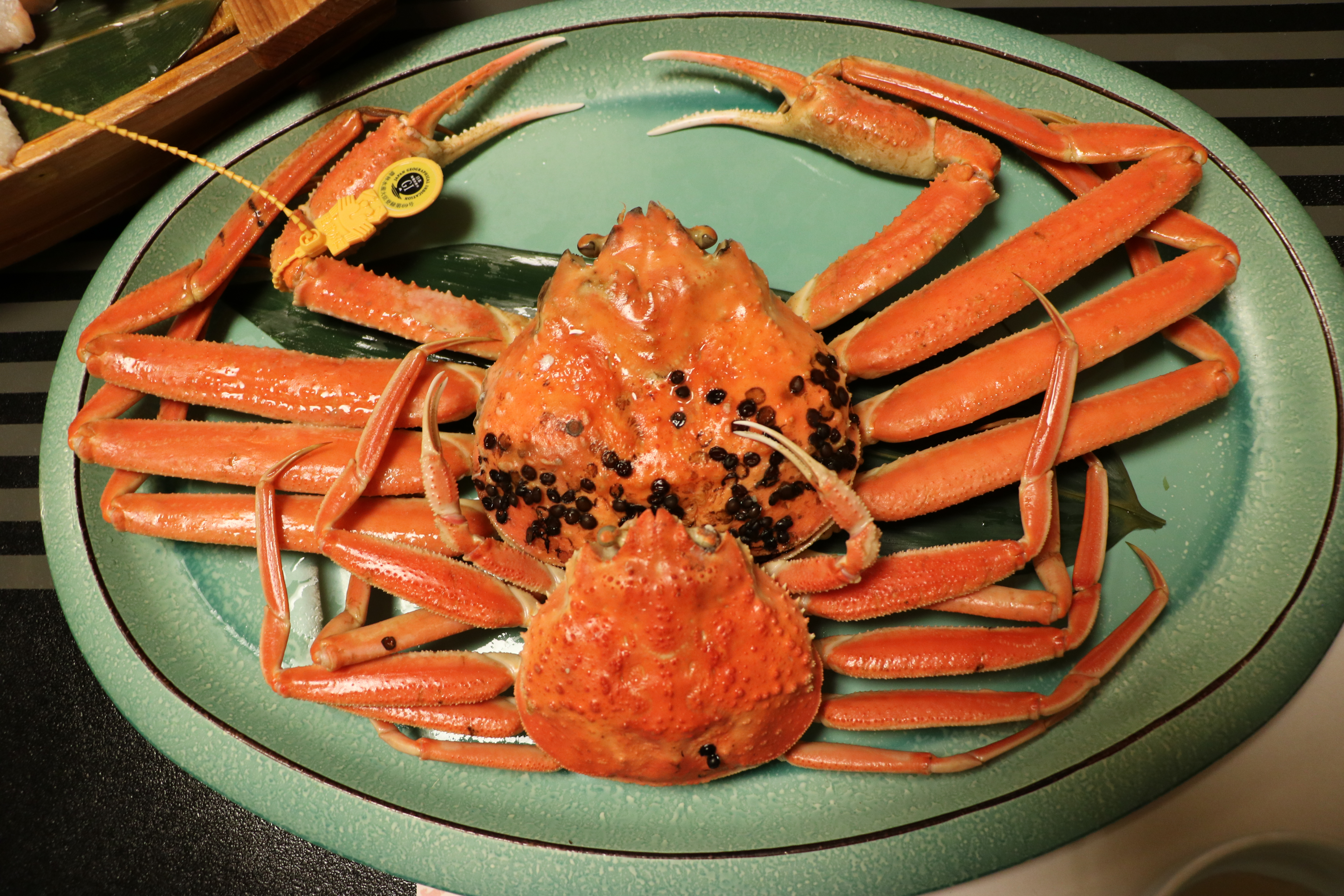
Boiled snow crab from Echizen

Following the Meiji Restoration, the area of present-day Echizen city was organised into Nanjō District within Fukui Prefecture. With the establishment of the modern municipalities system on April 1, 1889, the town of Takefu was created. It was named after an ancient Min'yō (folk song) called "Saibara", in the area of Echizen-Fuchū was known as "Takefu" during the Nara and Heian periods.

After the Meiji Restoration, the daimyō system was abolished and the former daimyō were merged into the new kazoku peerage. However, the Honda clan, being only a samurai retainer of the Matsudaira and not a daimyō, was moved into the shizoku class with lower ranking samurai. In 1870 the outraged Honda clan rebelled against the Meiji government against this perceived demotion. This riot is known as the Takefu Sōdō, which ended in 1879, and Honda Sukemoto was promoted danshaku in the kazoku system in 1884.

Take was raised to city status on April 1, 1948. On September 20, 1949, an incident known as the Takefu Jiken took place. At around 5 am the District Court and the District Public Prosecutor's Office caught fire. Within an hour, all of the court records and documents were destroyed. The fire was blamed on arson related to gang activity, and scenes from the movie Battles Without Honor and Humanity are said to be reminiscent of this incident. During the next 11 years, Takefu absorbed seven neighbouring villages and greatly increased in size and population.

On October 1, 2005, Takefu and the neighbouring town of Imadate were merged to create the city of Echizen City.

== Government ==
Echizen has a mayor-council form of government with a directly elected mayor and a unicameral city legislature of 22 members.

== Economy ==
Echizen has several large electronics and apparel factories, but it is known for its large number of flourishing small businesses. The area is traditionally known for its production of Echizen washi paper, and for cutlery. Agricultural production is centered on rice, with watermelons also being a major crop.

== Education ==
Echizen has 17 public elementary schools and seven middle schools operated by the city government, and four public high schools operated by the Fukui Prefectural Board of Education. The prefecture also operates one special education school. The private Jin-ai University is located in Echizen.

== Transport ==
=== Railway ===
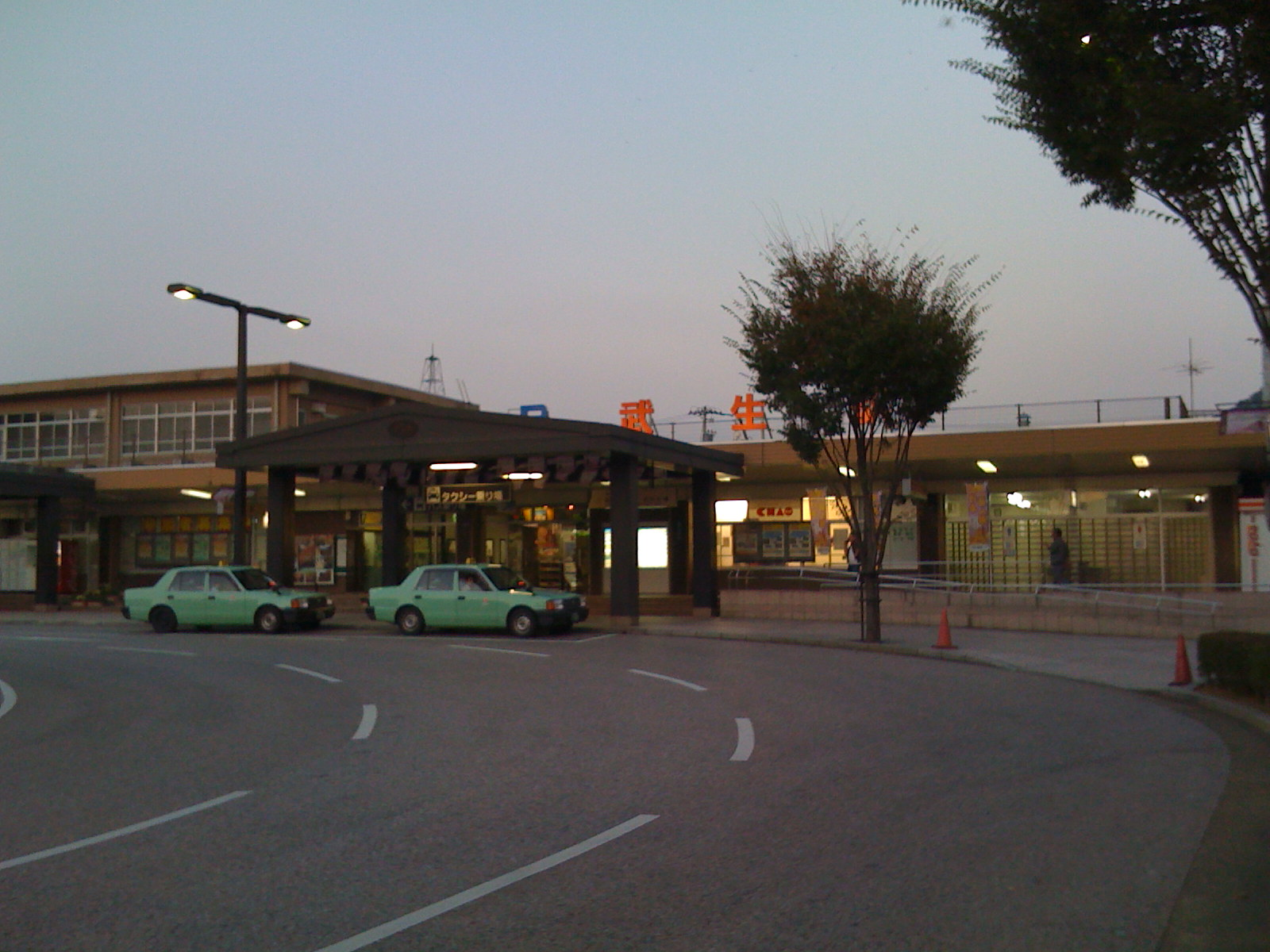
Takefu Station

Shinkansen service began on 16 March 2024.

- JR West - Hokuriku Shinkansen
  - Echizen-Takefu
- Hapi-Line Fukui (Former JR West Hokuriku Main Line)
  - Ōshio, Shikibu, Takefu
- Fukui Railway - Fukubu Line
  - Takefu-shin, Kitago, Sports Kōen, Iehisa

=== Bus ===
Regular services are provided primarily by Fukui Railway.

=== Highway ===
- Hokuriku Expressway
- National Route 8
- National Route 365
- National Route 417

== Local attractions ==
=== Shinto shrines ===
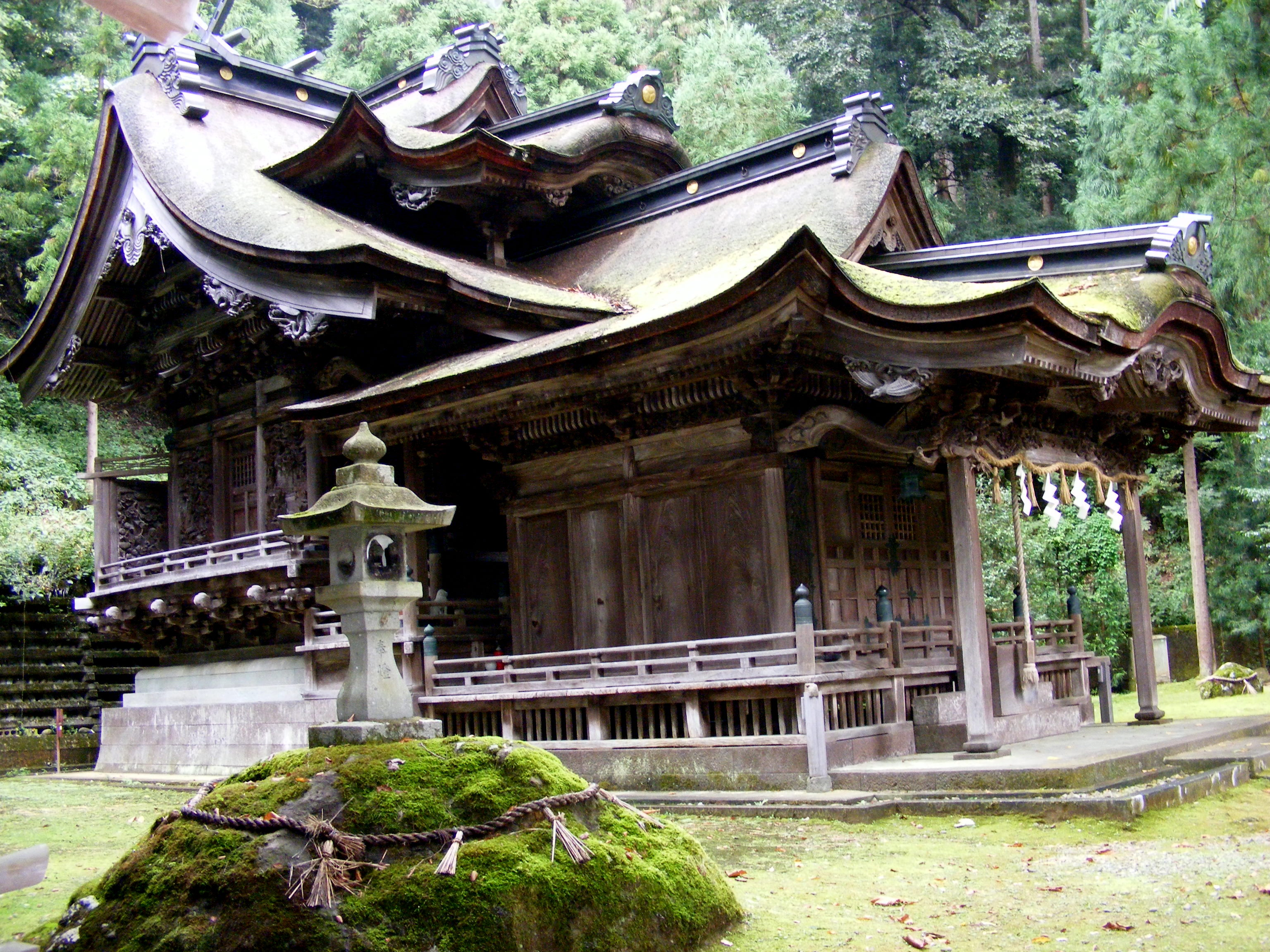
Ōtaki Shrine

- Ajimano Shrine (味真野神社)
- Hino Shrine (日野神社)
- Okafuto Shrine and Ōtaki Shrine (岡太神社、大瀧神社)
- Omushi Shrine (大虫神社)
- Ōshio Hachiman Shrine (大塩八幡宮): A national Important Cultural Property.
- Soja Shrine (総社大神宮)

=== Temples ===
- Gekkō-ji (月光寺)
- Gōshō-ji (豪摂寺)
- Hoyama-ji (帆山寺)
- Inshō-ji (引接寺)
- Jōfuku-ji Garden (浄福寺庭園)
- Kongō-in (金剛院)
- Reisen-ji (霊泉寺)
- Ryūmon-ji (龍門寺)
- Ryūsen-ji (龍泉寺)

=== Parks ===
- Ajimano Park (味真野苑)
- Echizen no Sato (越前の里), in which are found:
  - Man'yōkan (万葉館)
  - Chrysanthemum Exhibition Hall (万葉菊花園)
- Kakyō Park (花匡公園)
- Kojirō Park (小次郎公園)
- Murasaki Shikibu Park (紫式部公園): Built in honor of Murasaki Shikibu, author of The Tale of Genji, who lived in Echizen for a year with her father, Tametoki Fukuwara, the governor of Echizen. The park was modeled after a nobleman's residence in the Heian period. A statue of Murasaki Shikibu stands in the park, gazing in the direction of Kyoto.
- Rozan Park (廬山公園): Built on top of Murakuni mountain, this park overlooks the entire plain from Takefu to Fukui city. Mt. Hakusan can easily be seen from here on a clear day. This vantage point also provides a night view of Echizen, Sabae, and Fukui cities.

=== Castles and forts ===
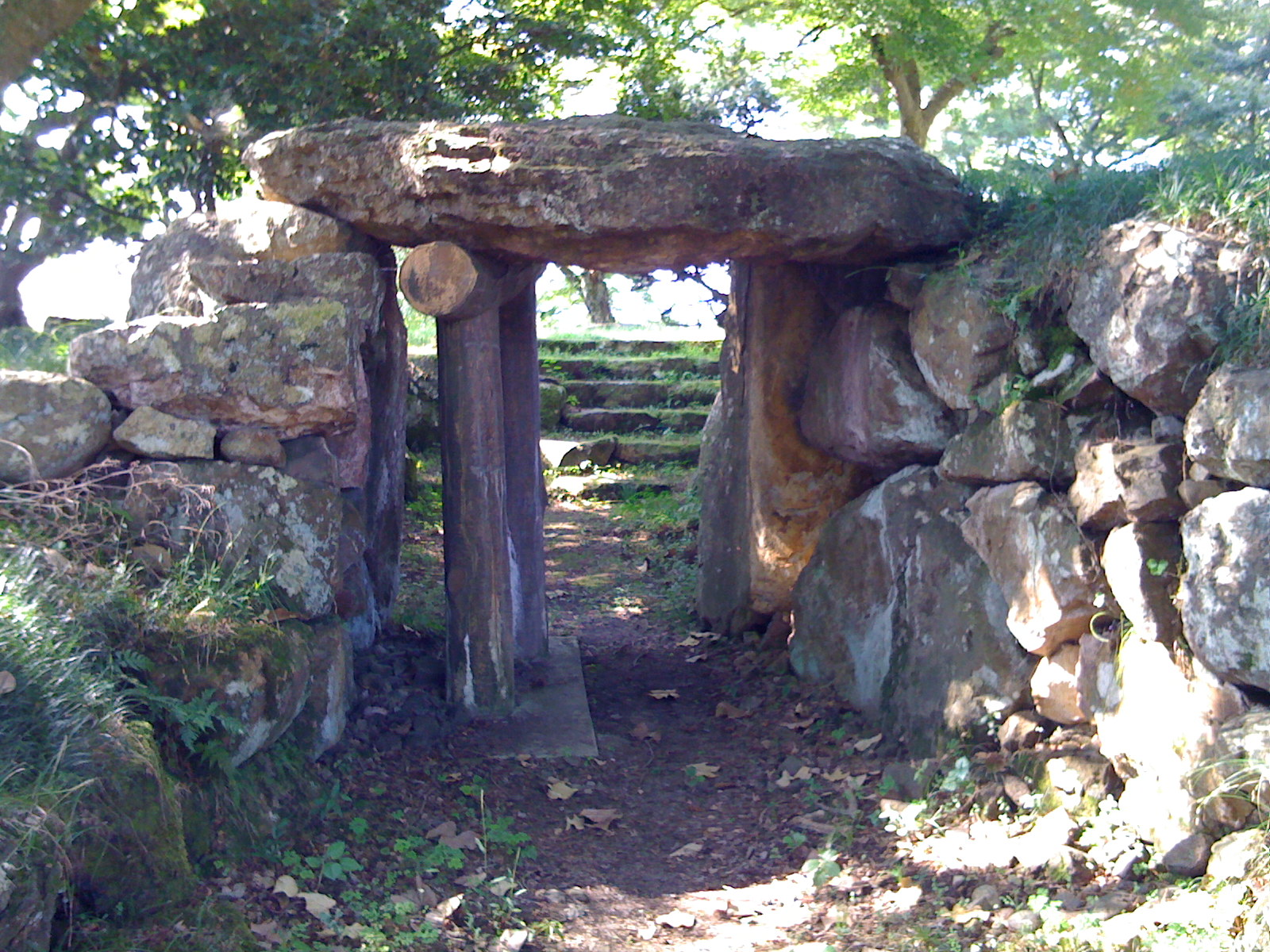
Remains of Komaru Castle's main gate.

As an important military center for centuries, Echizen contains the sites of a number of former castles. Some remains, including former gates, sections of moats, and mounds, can be seen in the city. Archaeological digs have also uncovered roof tiles, tools, weapons, and other artifacts at these sites.

- Fuchū Castle (府中城)
- Gyōjidake Castle (行事岳城)
- Honpo Jin'ya (本保陣屋)
- Komaru Castle (小丸城)
- Kongōin Castle (金剛院城)
- Kuratani Castle (鞍谷御所)
- Mount Buei Castle (武衛山城)
- Ōtaki Castle (大滝城)
- Ryūmonji Castle (龍門寺城)
- Shimomagara Magara Yakata (真柄館)
- Shinzenkōji Castle (新善光寺城)
- Shirosaki Jin'ya (白崎陣屋)
- Tokuma Magara Yakata (真柄館)

=== Other ===
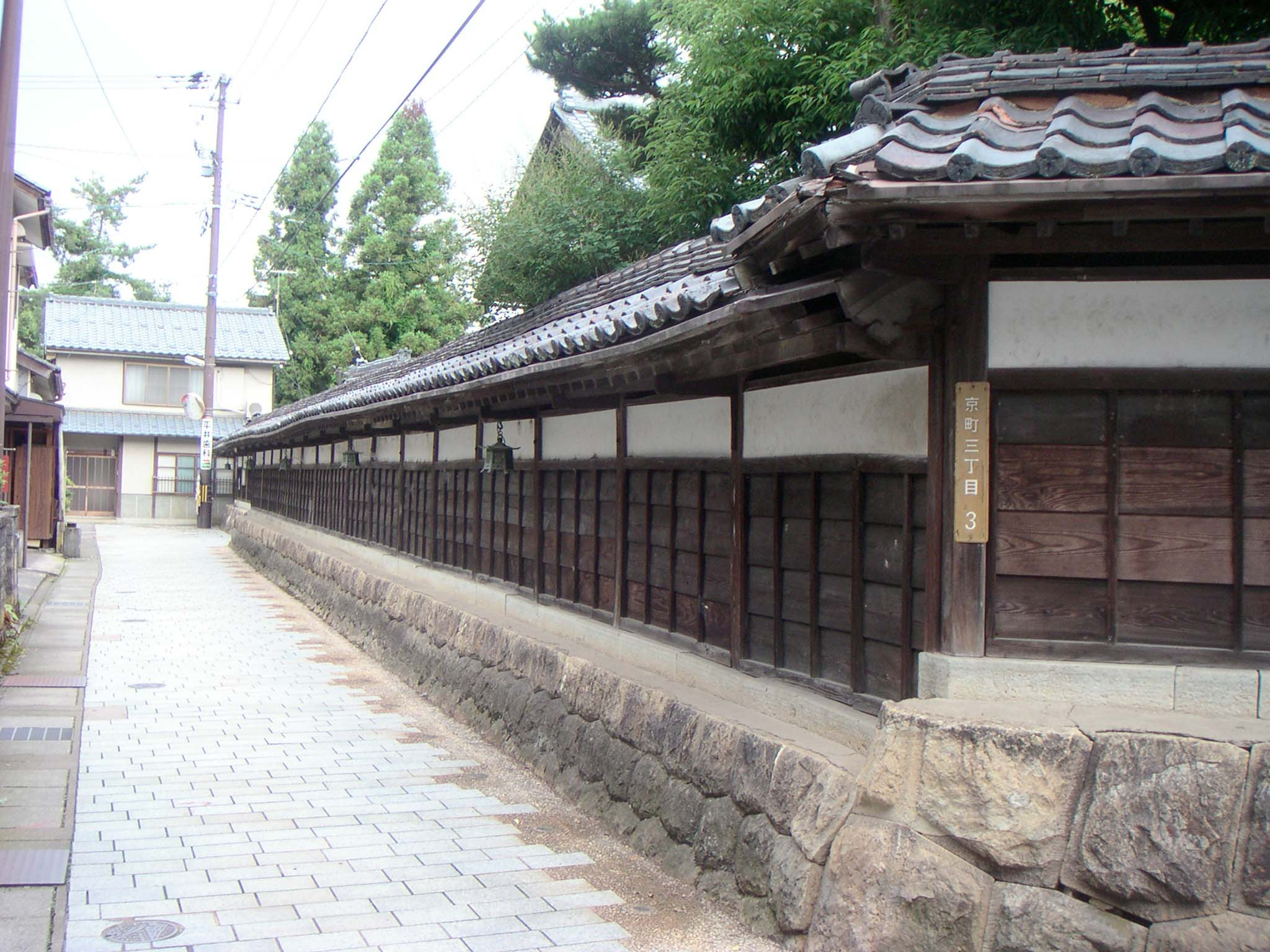
An alley in Kyomachi

- Kura-no-Tsuji (蔵の辻): Echizen's historic area in central Takefu is full of old warehouses with white painted walls. Outdoor concerts and festivals often take place in the open square in the center of this neighborhood.
- Takefu Town Hall Museum (武生公会堂記念館)
- Teramachi-dōri (寺町通り)
- Birthplace of Chihiro Iwasaki (いわさきちひろの生家)
- Takefu Knife Village (タケフナイフヴィレッジ)
- Usuzumi Cherry Tree (薄墨桜)
- Ōjigaike (皇子ケ池)
- Washi no Sato (和紙の里): This neighborhood is dedicated to the traditional craft of Japanese papermaking.
  - Japanese Paper Plaza (和紙の広場)
  - Papyrus Center (パピルス館): This building holds information and a workshop about the art of traditional Echizen paper.
  - Cultural Museum of Paper (紙の文化博物館)
  - Udatsu Craftsman's Studio (卯立の工芸館)
- Yanagi Falls (柳の滝)
- Minowaki no Tokimizu (蓑脇の時水): This waterfall was selected as one of Japan's 100 best scenic views.
- Uno Tea Ceremony Museum

=== Festivals (matsuri) and events ===
- Echizen Kami (paper) Festival: This festival is held annually at the Echizen Washi no Sato (paper village) to celebrate the local washi and the papermaking deity, Kawakami Gozen.
- Takefu Kikuningyo (chrysanthemum doll) Festival: This festival is held annually at Takefu Central Park.
- Echizen Kani (crab) Festival
- Echizen Togei (pottery) Festival: This festival is held annually in May at the Echizen Togei Mura (pottery village).

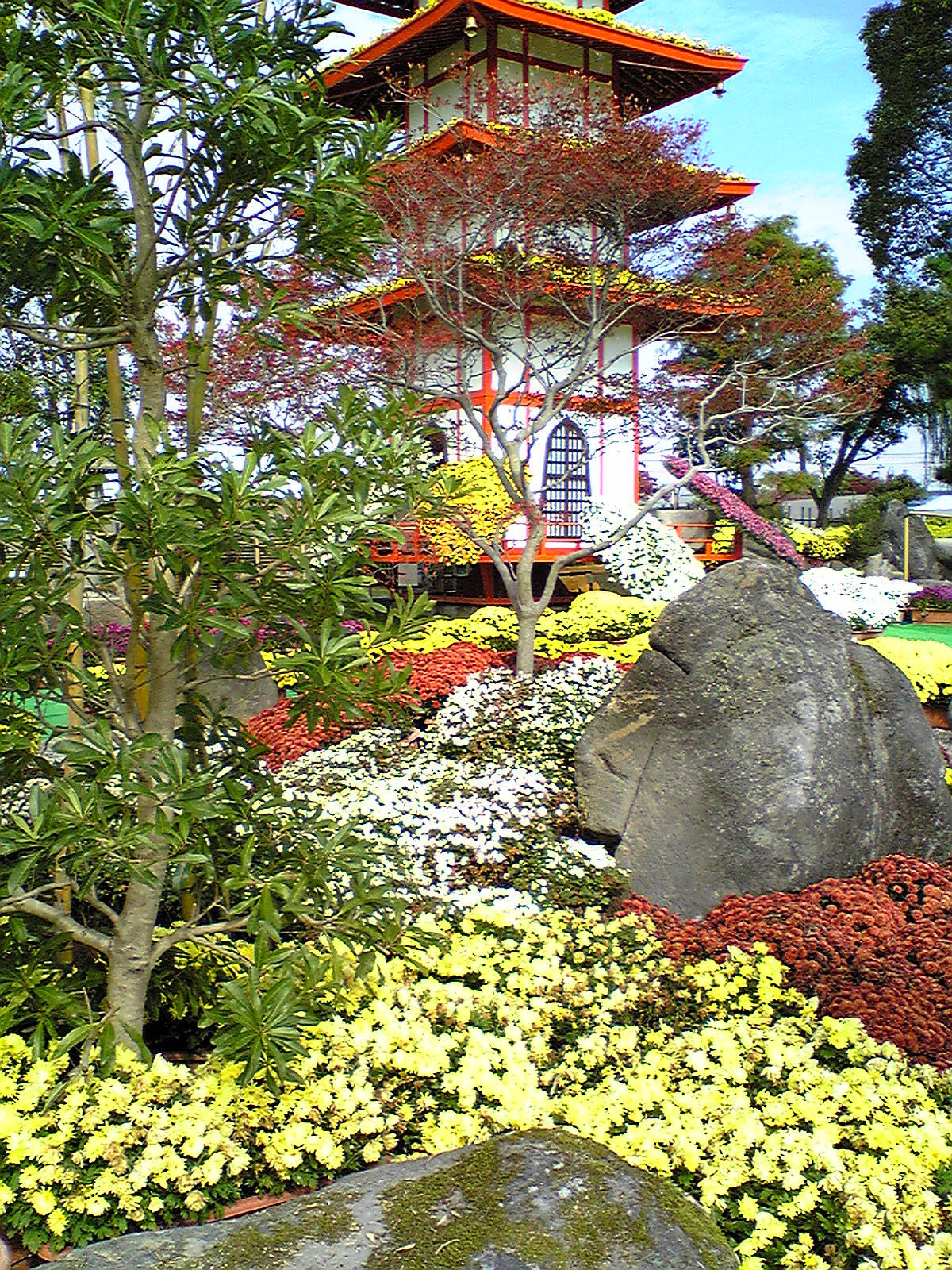
Kikuningyo Festival's chrysanthemum pagoda

=== Specialty products ===
==== Local foods ====
- Buckwheat noodles soba and oroshisoba (with grated daikon)
- Echizen crab
- Habutae maki: sweet bean paste and mochi covered in sponge cake
- Satsukigase: a Japanese sweet
- Mizuyōkan: a firm sweet made from azuki beans
- Kenkera: an old-fashioned Japanese sweet
- Baigetsu senbei: a rice cracker dusted with sugar
- Manshō beans

=== Traditional crafts ===
- Chrysanthemum dolls
- Echizen cutlery
- Echizen tansu
- Echizen washi
- Traditional roof tiles

== Notable people from Echizen ==
- Ryoichi Ikegami, manga artist
- Tomomi Inada, lawyer, Minister of Defense (Japan)
- Ichibei Iwano, a paper maker and Living National Treasure
- Chihiro Iwasaki, children's book illustrator
- Keizan, one of the founders of Sōtō Zen Buddhism
- Sasaki Kojirō, swordsman
- Kinya Machimura, businessman and statesman
- Akihisa Makida, professional baseball player for the Rakuten Golden Eagles
- Masatoki Minami (Fumitoshi Koshinaka), travel writer and railway photographer
- Makara Naotaka, samurai
- Michiko Neya, voice actress
- Murasaki Shikibu, novelist, poet, author of one of the earliest novels in human history
- Machi Tawara, writer, translator, and poet
- Akiyama Tokuzō, imperial chef
- Hiromoto Watanabe, governor of Tokyo and founder of Tokyo University

== Cityscape ==
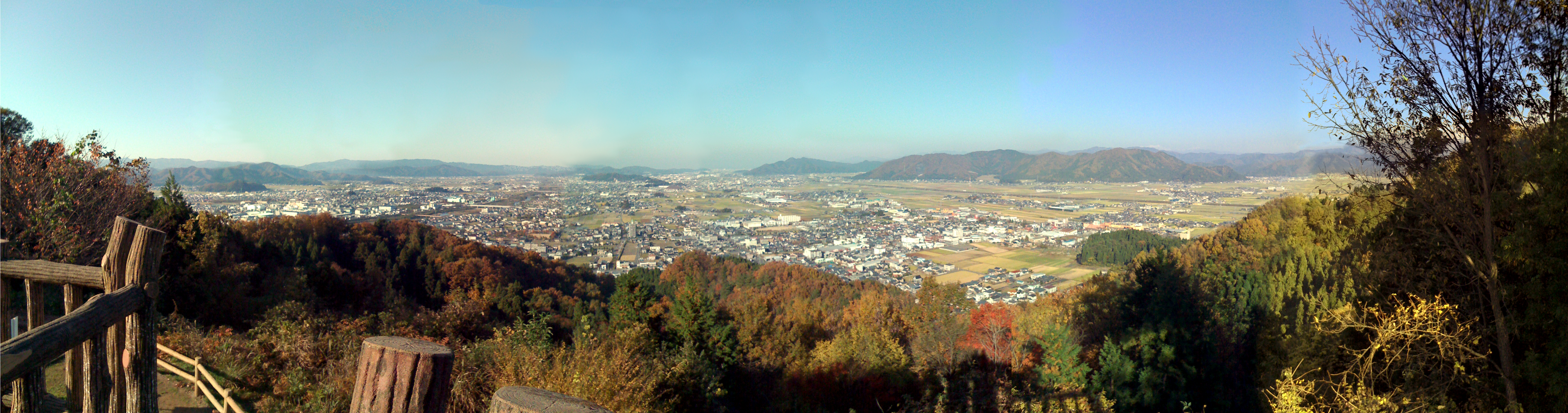
Panoramic view of Echizen from the top of Murakuni mountain

== Sister cities ==
- Takayama, Japan
- Motosu, Japan
- Montevallo, Alabama, United States
