= Honpo Jin'ya =

Coordinates: 35°55′26″N 136°09′25″E

Honpo Jin'ya (本保陣屋, Honpo Jin'ya)

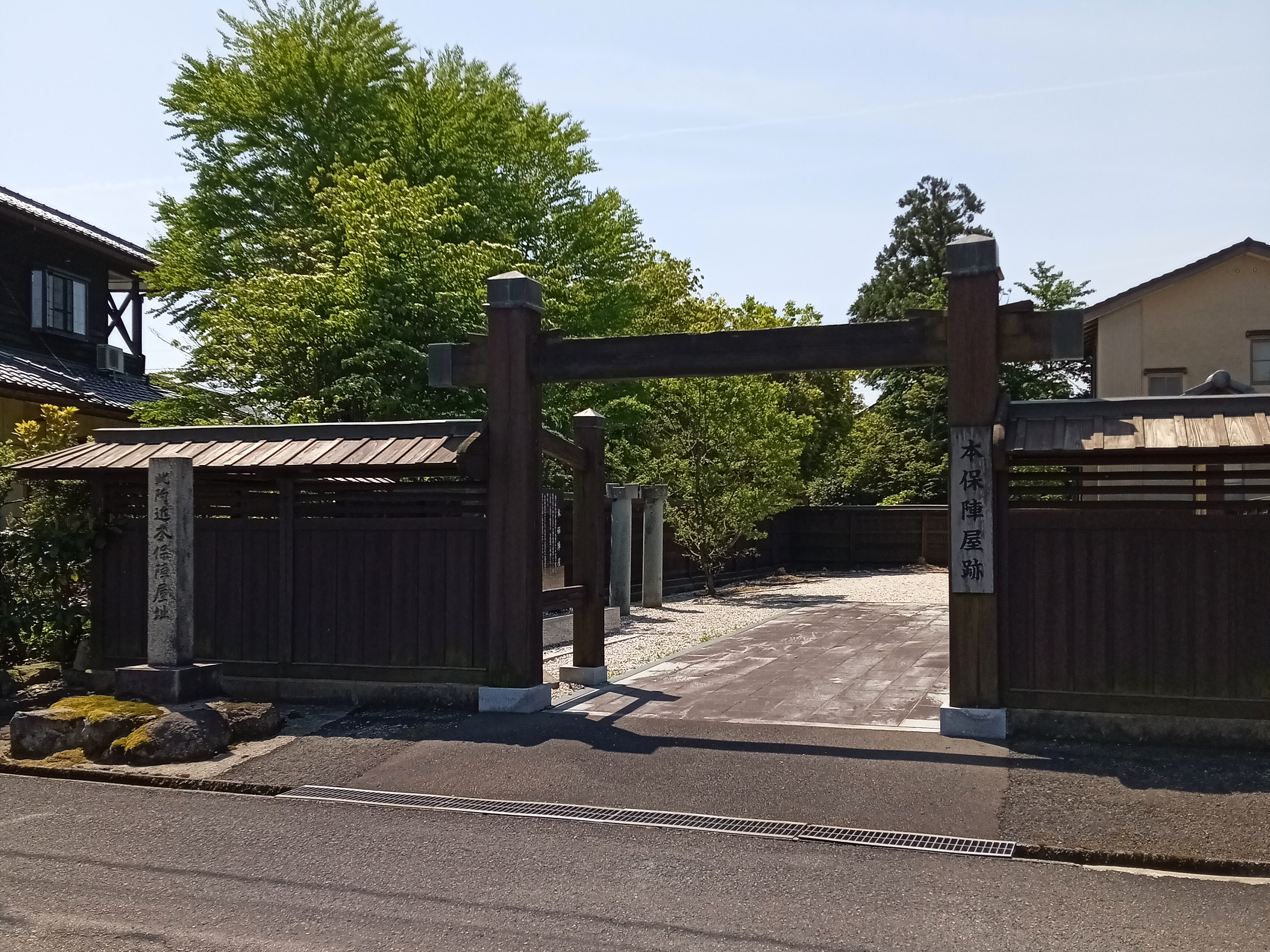
Honpo Jin'ya

was a jin'ya (fortified residence) located in what is now part of the city of Echizen, Fukui Prefecture, Japan. Under the Edo period Tokugawa shogunate, was the administrative center for the scattered tenryō and hatamoto holdings in Echizen province. Today, a memorial with a reconstructed gate can be seen on the site.

== History ==
During the Edo people, Echizen province was fragmented into several feudal domains as well as extensive territories under the direct control of the Tokugawa shogunate or assigned to a number of hatamoto retainers. The territories not belonging to any feudal domain were administered by the Hida Gundai (飛騨郡代), the shogunate's administrator for the province of Hida. In 1720, in order to better administer the territories located in Echizen Province, a jin'ya was constructed in what was then Honpo-machi, Nyū District, Previously, shogunate outposts had been in what is now Sabae and Katsuyama. The Honpo Jin'ya was abolished in 1721 and re-established in 1744. In 1767, it administered a kokudaka of approximately 55,000 koku in 175 villages.

In 1869, with the abolition of the han system following the Meiji Restoration, Honpo Jin'ya became the administrative center of the newly formed "Honpo Prefecture". Honpo Prefecture existed for just under one year, after which it was absorbed into Fukui Prefecture in 1870. Two years later, the jin'ya was dismantled and its land sold as farmland. The remains of many of the structures can still be seen today.
