= Jin-ai University =

Private university in Echizen, Japan

Coordinates: 35°53′29.2″N 136°12′40.8″E

- 仁愛大学
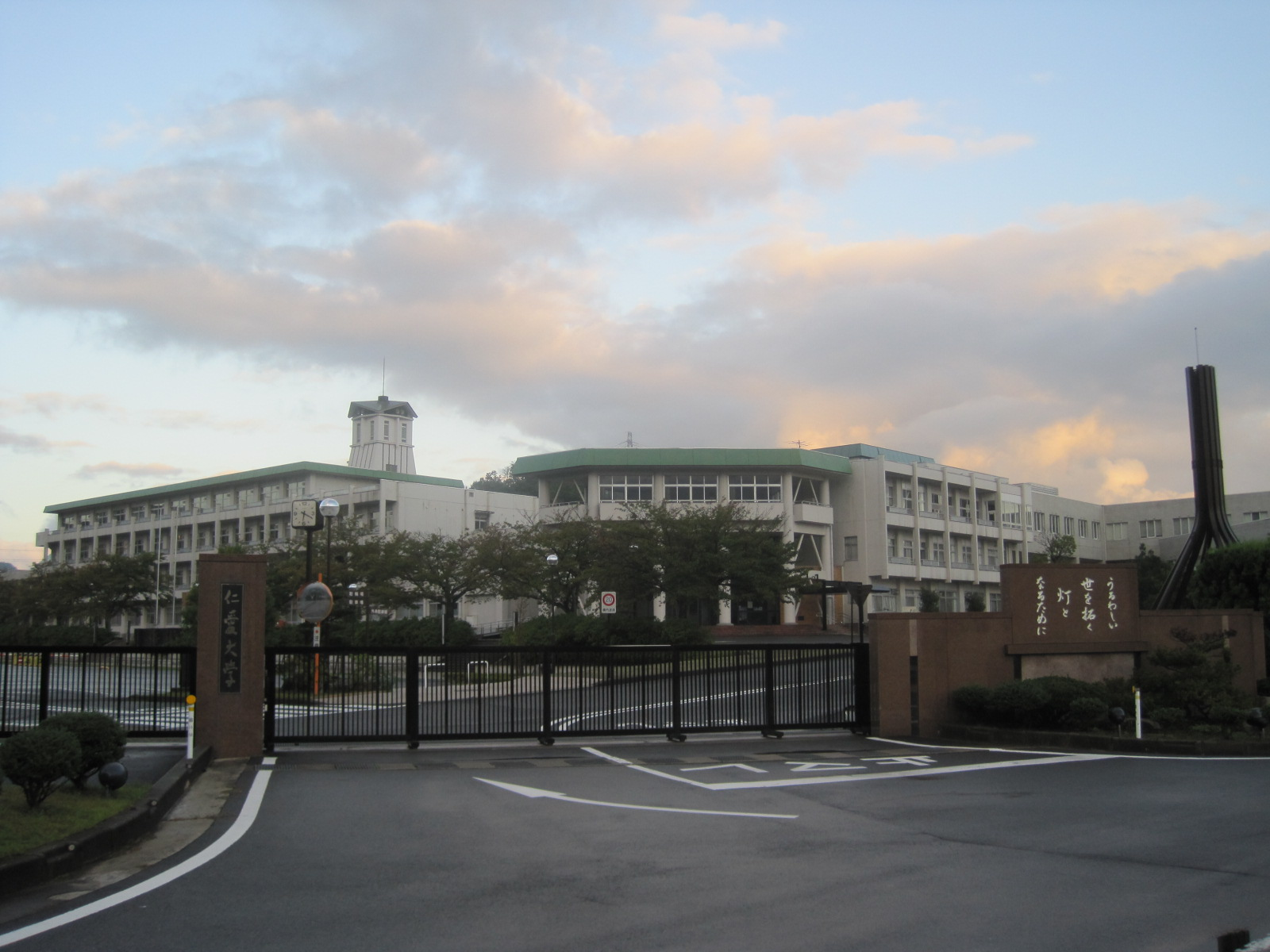
- Jin-ai University
- Type: Private
- Established: 2001; 25 years ago
- President: Masanobu Kamuro
- Location: Echizen, Fukui, Japan
- Website: Official website

Jin-ai University (仁愛大学, Jin'ai Daigaku) is a private university in Echizen, Fukui Prefecture, Japan, affiliated with the Jōdo Shinshū sect of Japanese Buddhism. The predecessor of the school was established in 1898 (128 years ago), and it was accredited as a university in 2010.
