= The Emperor's Cook =

2015 Japanese drama TV series

- Also known as: Tennō no Ryōriban
- Genre: Drama
- Created by: Hisahide Sugimori
- Based on: Tennō No Ryōriban
- Written by: Yoshiko Morishita
- Directed by: Yuichiro Hirakawa, Shingo Okamoto
- Starring: Takeru Satoh; Haru Kuroki; Kenta Kiritani; Tasuku Emoto; Ryohei Suzuki; Hideaki Itō; Hiromi Go; Kaoru Kobayashi
- Ending theme: "Yume Miru Hito" by Masashi Sada
- Country of origin: Japan
- Original language: Japanese
- No. of episodes: 12

Production
- Producer: Akihiko Ishimaru
- Production locations: Fukushima, Ibaraki, Kobe, Okayama, Paris
- Running time: 54 min (Japan)
- Production company: TBS

Original release
- Network: TBS
- Release: April 26 – July 12, 2015

The Emperor's Cook (Japanese: 天皇の料理番, Hepburn: Tennō no Ryōriban) is a 2015 Japanese television drama based on the novel Tennō no Ryōriban by Hisahide Sugimori, depicting the life of imperial cook Tokuzō Akiyama. It premiered on TBS on 26 April 2015, starring Takeru Satoh in the lead role. The 1st episode is 108 minutes, 2nd, 3rd, and 6th episodes are 64 minutes long. The series was well received by the public, earning the highest viewership rating in its time slot during its run time.

== Plot ==
Tokuzō Akiyama is a good-for-nothing young man living in the countryside, who gets easily absorbed in activities he finds interesting, but quickly loses interest and moves on, creating trouble for his family. He is married off to a merchant household to teach him discipline, and his wife gradually grows to love his personality. Tokuzō, however, falls in love again: this time with cooking. As he delivers goods to the army kitchen, the army chef introduces him to cutlet, which prompts Tokuzō to learn the craft. On a whim, he decides to leave his wife to study cooking in Tokyo. Amid hardship and humiliation, the young man who never felt compelled to stick to a job, keeps his dream to become the emperor's cook at only 25 years of age.

== Cast ==
- Takeru Satoh - Tokuzō Akiyama
- Haru Kuroki - Toshiko Takahama
- Kenta Kiritani - Shintarō Matsui
- Tasuku Emoto - Tatsukichi Yamagami
- Saki Takaoka - Ume Morita
- Gajirō Satō - Sennosuke Morita
- Sei Ashina - Kayano
- Ryū Morioka - Kurasaburō Akiyama
- Anna Ishibashi - Mitsuko Takahama
- Yoshiyuki Tsubokura - Okumura
- Jinta Nishizawa - Masashi Sasaki
- Daisuke Kuroda - Araki
- Takeshi Ōnishi - Sekiguchi
- Mamoru Watanabe - Sugiyama
- Hirotaka Ōkuma - Fujita
- Yūji Kido - Suzuki
- Ryōhei Suzuki - Shūtarō Akiyama
- Tetsuya Takeda - Professor Shōgo Kirizuka
- Hideaki Itō - Sergeant Yūkichi Tanabe (Cook of the 36th Infantry Regiment)
- Yumi Asō - Okichi (Shūtarō's lodging house landlady)
- Masaya Kato - Takeshirō Iogi (Chef to the British Minister to Japan)
- Yōjin Hino - Kinnosuke Takahama
- Satoko Ōshima - Harue Takahama
- Jun Miho - Fuki Akiyama
- Tetta Sugimoto - Shūzō Akiyama
- Kaoru Kobayashi - Kamaichi Usami (Chef of the Peer's Club)
- Hiromi Go - Japanese Ambassador to France Shin'ichirō Awano
- Noémie Nakai - Simone
- Kazuyuki Asano - Viscount Hayato Fukuba (Director of the Imperial Cuisine Division, Ministry of the Imperial Household)
- Kazue Itō - Takigawa (Lady-in-waiting of Empress Teimei)
- Emi Wakui - Empress Teimei
- Zen Kajihara - Emperor Showa
- Sapphira Van Doorn - Françoise

== Episodes ==
No.	Title	Directed by	Original release date	Ratings (%)
1	"〜時代を超える人間の愛と命の感動物語〜 どうしようもない男が百年前に見た料理への果てなき夢…"	Yuichiro Hirakawa	April 26, 2015	15.9%
2	"料理はまごころ"	Yuichiro Hirakawa	May 3, 2015	11.4%
3	"あいしてるの決断"	Shingo Okamoto	May 10, 2015	12.0%
4	"愛し君よサラバ"	Yuichiro Hirakawa	May 17, 2015	12.7%
5	"おさな夫婦の結末"	Yuichiro Hirakawa	May 24, 2015	14.5%
6	"愛と命の果てパリ"	Yuichiro Hirakawa	May 31, 2015	14.1%
7	"パリと差別と結婚"	Yūji Nakamae	June 7, 2015	14.9%
8	"パリでの卒業式"	Yūji Nakamae	June 14, 2015	15.3%
9	"皇居編〜ザリガニと御即位の御大礼"	Yuichiro Hirakawa	June 21, 2015	16.7%
10	"皇居編〜関東大震災と家族の決意"	Daisuke Yamamuro	June 28, 2015	16.1%
11	"皇居編〜最愛の人と最後の晩餐"	Yuichiro Hirakawa	July 5, 2015	16.8%
12	"完結〜料理番の人生敗戦の料理番がGHQに起こした愛の奇跡"	Yuichiro Hirakawa	July 12, 2015	17.7%

== Production ==
The drama was filmed in various locations in Japan (including Fukushima, Ibaraki, Kobe, Okayama) and in France. Takeru Satoh took cooking classes and practiced knife skills for four months to portray the character and did the cooking scenes without a stand-in. The French and English lines are also spoken by Satoh without post-dubbing.

== Accolades ==
Awards
Award	Date of ceremony	Category	Nominees	Result
85th Television Drama Academy Awards	August 12, 2015	Best Drama	The Emperor's Cook	Won
85th Television Drama Academy Awards	August 12, 2015	Best Actor	Takeru Satoh	Won
85th Television Drama Academy Awards	August 12, 2015	Best Supporting Actress	Haru Kuroki	Won
85th Television Drama Academy Awards	August 12, 2015	Best Supporting Actor	Ryohei Suzuki	Won
85th Television Drama Academy Awards	August 12, 2015	Best Script	Yoshiko Morishita	Won
85th Television Drama Academy Awards	August 12, 2015	Best Directing	Yuichiro Hirakawa, Shingo Okamoto, Yuji Nakamae, Daisuke Yamamuro	Won
8th International Drama Festival in Tokyo	October 21, 2015	The Grand Prix	The Emperor's Cook	Won
8th International Drama Festival in Tokyo	October 21, 2015	Best Actor	Takeru Satoh	Won
8th International Drama Festival in Tokyo	October 21, 2015	Best Actress	Haru Kuroki	Won
8th International Drama Festival in Tokyo	October 21, 2015	Best Supporting Actor	Ryohei Suzuki	Won
24th Hashida Awards	May 10, 2016	Best Actor	Takeru Satoh	Won
24th Hashida Awards	May 10, 2016	Best Supporting Actor	Ryohei Suzuki	Won
24th Hashida Awards	May 10, 2016	Best Drama	The Emperor's Cook	Won

Preceded by Ryūsei Wagon (18 January 2015 - 22 March 2015)	TBS Sunday Dramas; Sundays 21:00 - 21:54 (JST)	Succeeded by Napoleon no Mura (19 July 2015 - 20 September 2015)
