= Nishiyama-Kōen Station =

Railway station in Sabae, Fukui, Japan

Nishiyama-Kōen Station 西山公園駅
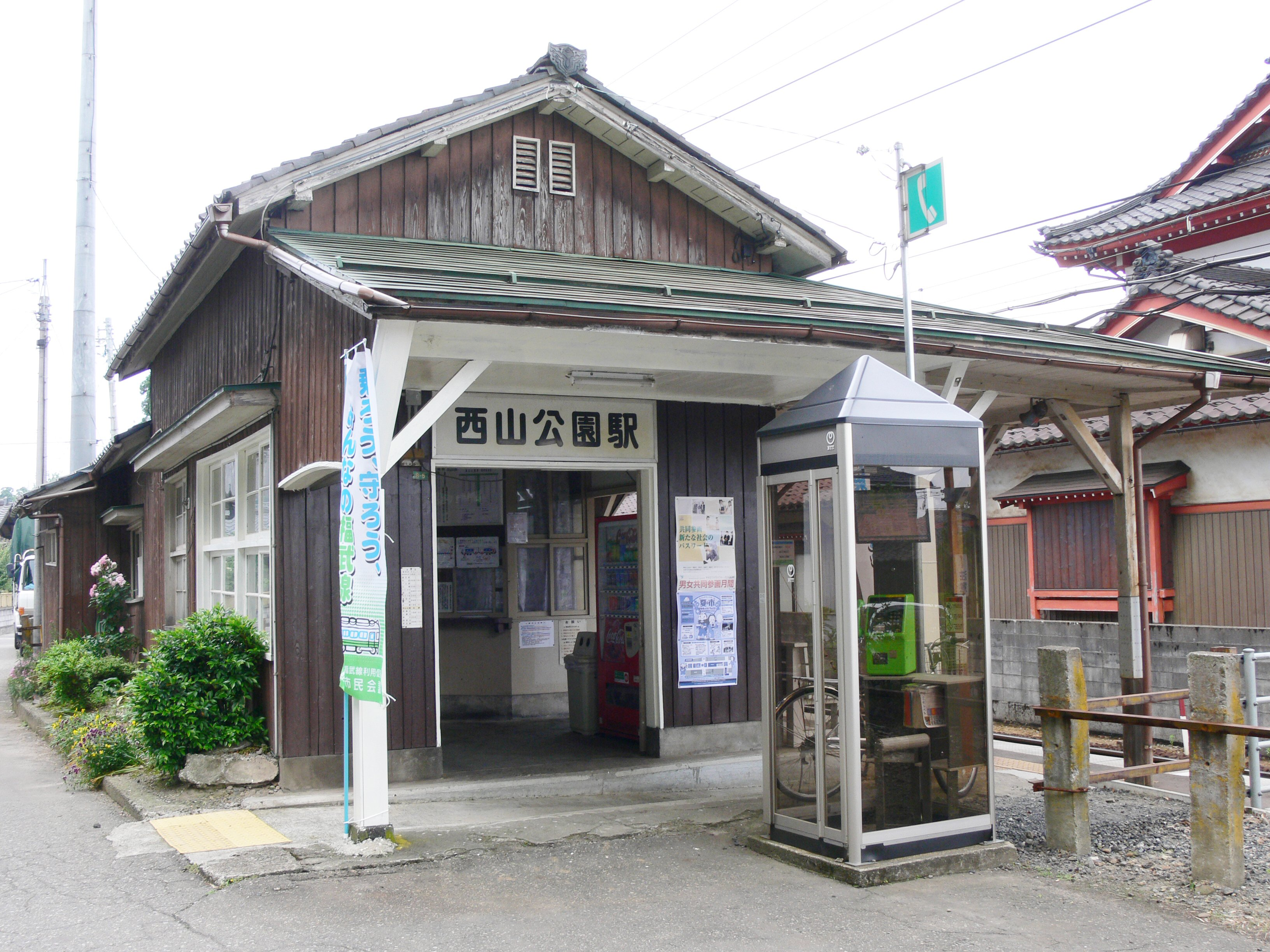
- Nishiyama-Kōen Station

General information
- Location: 1-8-5 Chōsenji-chō, Sabae, Fukui （福井県鯖江市長泉寺町1丁目8-5） Japan
- Coordinates: 35°57′07″N 136°11′08″E
- Operator: Fukui Railway
- Line: ■ Fukubu Line
- Distance: 6.0 km from Takefu-shin
- Platforms: 1 side platform
- Tracks: 1
- Connections

Other information
- Status: Unstaffed
- Station code: F6
- Website: Official website

History
- Opened: August 13, 1929
- Former names: Shimo-Sabae (until 1987)

Passengers
- FY2015: 37
Location
- Location within Japan

Nishiyama-Kōen Station (西山公園駅, Nishiyama-kōen-eki) is a Fukui Railway Fukubu Line railway station located in the city of Sabae, Fukui Prefecture, Japan.

== Lines ==
Nishiyama-Kōen Station is served by the Fukui Railway Fukubu Line, and is located 6.0 kilometers from the terminus of the line at Takefu-shin.

== Station layout ==
The station consists of one ground-level side platform serving a single bi-directional track. The station is unattended. However, during special events (such as Suribachiyaito and the Azalea Festival during Golden Week) the station is staffed during midday, and some express trains bound for Fukui-Ekimae make stops.

== Adjacent stations ==
«	Service	»
Fukui Railway Fukubu Line
Express: Does not stop at this station
Nishi-Sabae	Local	Mizuochi

== History ==
The station opened on August 13, 1929 as Shimo-Sabae Station (下鯖江駅). It was renamed Nishiyama-Kōen Station on April 10, 1987.

== Passenger statistics ==
In fiscal 2015, the station was used by an average of 37 passengers daily (boarding passengers only).

== Surrounding area ==
- Nishiyama Park and the Nishiyama Zoo are a short walk west from the station.
- Sabae City Hall and the Citizens' Center are also nearby.

== See also ==
- List of railway stations in Japan
