= Imadate District, Fukui =

District in Fukui prefecture, Japan

Coordinates: 35°54′44″N 136°16′35″E

Imadate (今立郡, Imadate-gun) is a district located in Fukui Prefecture, Japan.

As of October 1, 2005, the district has an estimated population of 3,405, with a density of 17.49 persons per km^{2}. The total area is 194.72 km^{2}.

The district consists of the town of Ikeda.

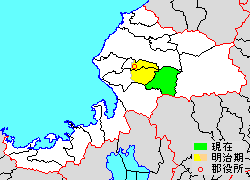
Map showing original extent of Imadate District in Fukui Prefecture: * yellow - areas formerly within the district borders during the early Meiji period: 1. Ikeda-machi

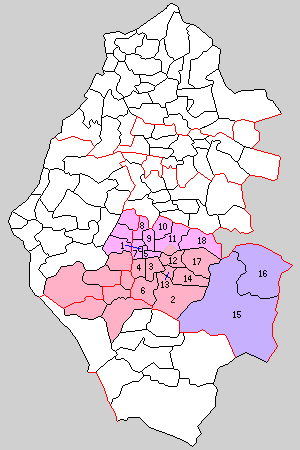
Colored areas are in this district.

On October 1, 2005, the city of Takefu absorbed the town of Imadate to form the new city of Echizen.
