= Nishiyama Zoo =

Zoo in Sabae, Japan

Sabae City Nishiyama Zoo
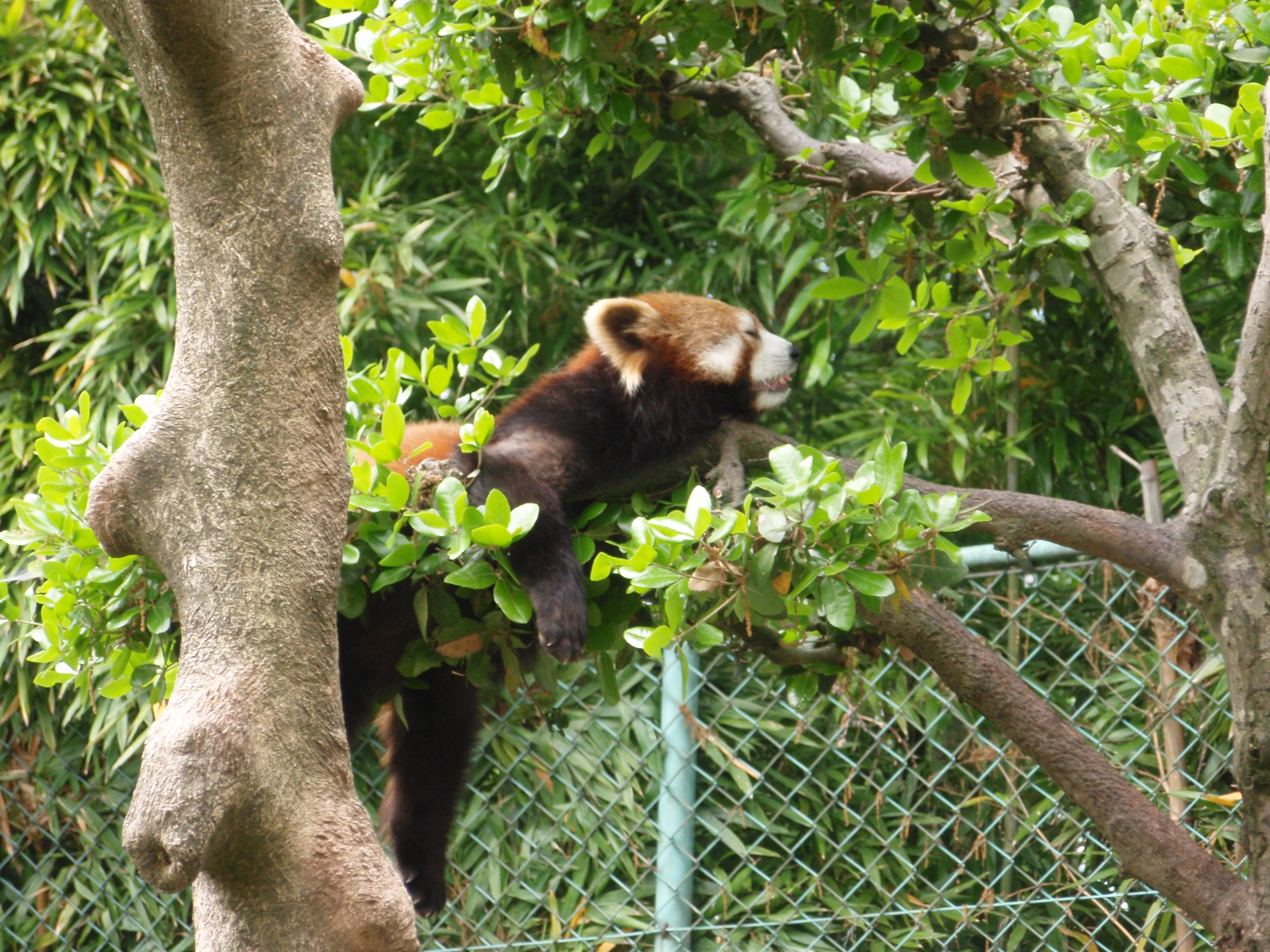
- A red panda
- Interactive map of Sabae City Nishiyama Zoo
- 35.9506°N 136.1809°E
- Date opened: April 1985; 41 years ago
- Location: 3-8-9, Sakura-machi, Sabae, Fukui, Japan (福井県鯖江市桜町3丁目8番9号)
- No. of animals: 58 (2018)
- No. of species: 12 (2018)
- Memberships: JAZA
- Major exhibits: Red pandas, small primates, birds
- Public transit: Fukui Railway's Nishi-Sabae or Nishiyama-Kōen Stations
- Website: www.city.sabae.fukui.jp/nishiyama_zoo

Sabae City's Nishiyama Zoo (鯖江市西山動物園, Sabae-shi Nishiyama Dōbutsuen) is a small zoo in the city of Sabae, Fukui Prefecture, Japan. The admission-free municipal zoo is on a low hill (Nishiyama Park). It is known for its red pandas; the species is the official animal of the city.

Despite its small size, the zoo is home to one of the largest groups of red pandas in Japan: 11 individuals as of 2018. They are descendants of a pair donated by the Beijing Zoo in 1984. The founding couple arrived at the Nishiyama Zoo before it officially opened the following year (though the enclosures were ready). The youngest pandas now belong to the seventh generation.

The Beijing Zoo later donated red-crowned cranes (1985), François' langur (1987), and lar gibbons (1991) to the zoo. Other zoo residents include black squirrel monkeys, pheasants, Japanese cranes and peafowl.

It is about 0.5 km from both Nishi-Sabae Station (in the south) and Nishiyama-Kōen Station (in the east). It opens at 9 am and closes at 4:30 pm daily, except Mondays (closed).
