= Shinzenkōji Castle =

Coordinates: 35°54′09″N 136°09′49″E

Shinzenkōji Castle (新善光寺城, Shinzenkōji-jō) was a flatland castle located in Echizen, Fukui Prefecture, Japan. Today, a memorial to the castle can be seen at what is now Shōgaku-ji.
