= Imadate, Fukui =

Dissolved municipality in Fukui prefecture, Japan

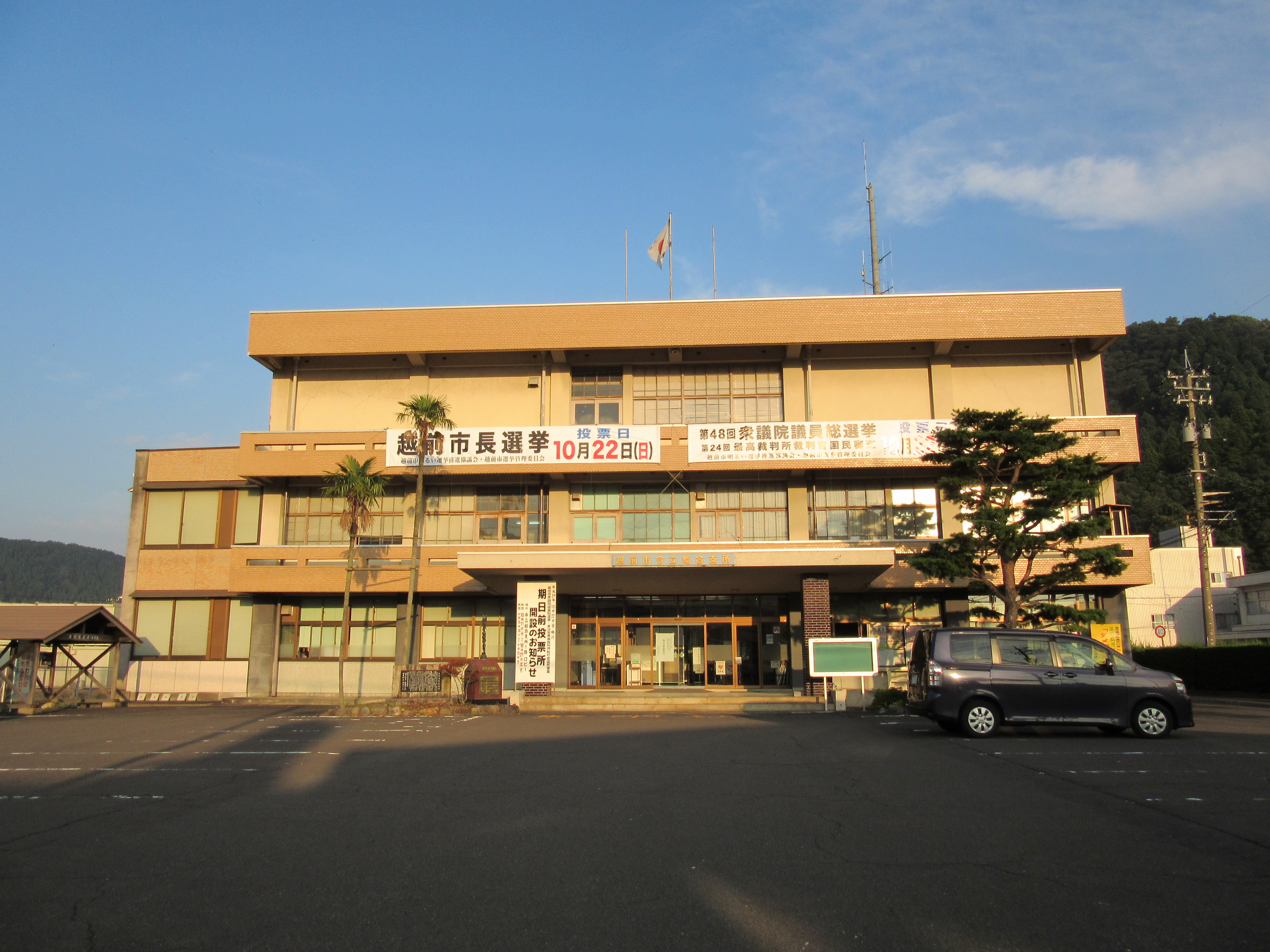
former Imadate Town Hall

Imadate (今立町, Imadate-chō) was a town located in Imadate District, Fukui Prefecture, Japan.

As of 2020, the town had an estimated population of 2,423 and a density of 12.45 persons per km^{2}. The total area was 194.7 km^{2}.

On October 1, 2005, Imadate, along with the city of Takefu, was merged to create the city of Echizen.

Established in 1956, Imadate was a fairly well-renowned center of Japanese paper making, or washi. The town was situated approximately 10 miles (16 km) southeast of the prefectural capital of Fukui shi, and 5 miles (8 km) east of the city of Takefu.
