= Takefu, Fukui =

Dissolved municipality in Fukui prefecture, Japan

Takefu (武生市, Takefu-shi) was a city located in Fukui Prefecture, Japan. The city was established on April 1, 1948.

As of 2003, the city had an estimated population of 73,662 and a density of 397.49 persons per km^{2}; about half the population lived in the urban center and half spread among smaller towns and tiny villages spread out among agricultural plains and more remote mountainous areas. The total area was 185.32 km^{2}.

On October 1, 2005, Takefu, along with the town of Imadate (from Imadate District), was merged to create the city of Echizen.
