= Tokuzō Akiyama =

Japanese chef (1888–1974)

Akiyama Tokuzō
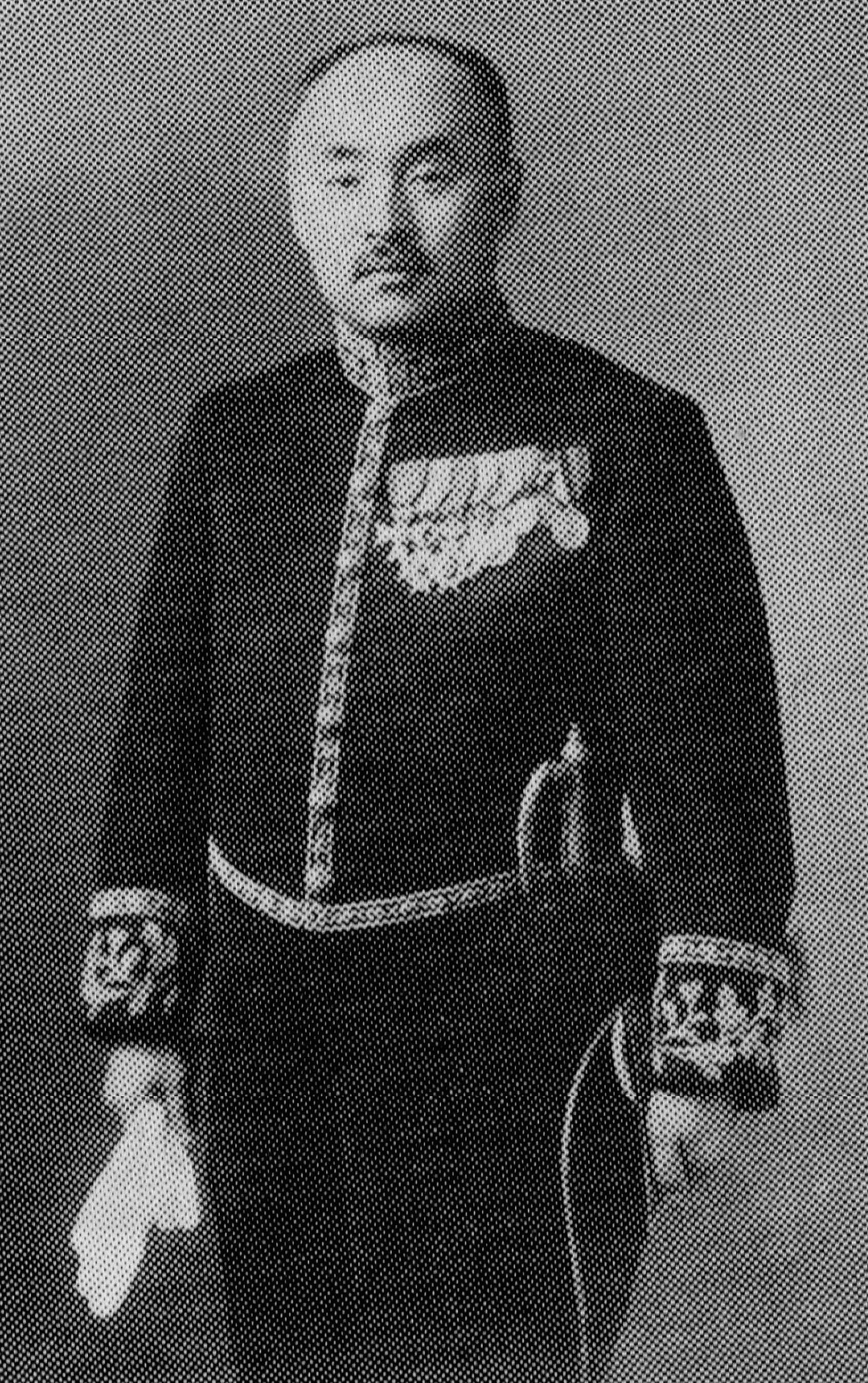
- Akiyama Tokuzō at the age of 44
- Born: 高森 徳蔵 Takamori Tokuzō; August 30, 1888; Echizen, Fukui
- Died: July 14, 1974 (aged 85); Tokyo
- Occupation: imperial chef

Tokuzō Akiyama (秋山 徳蔵, Akiyama Tokuzō; August 30, 1888 – July 14, 1974) was a Japanese chef who served as Emperor Taishō's and later Emperor Shōwa's imperial chef. He is regarded as an influential figure in spreading French cuisine in Japan. His life was adapted into a novel and several television series. He is regarded as the "Japanese Escoffier".

== Life and career ==
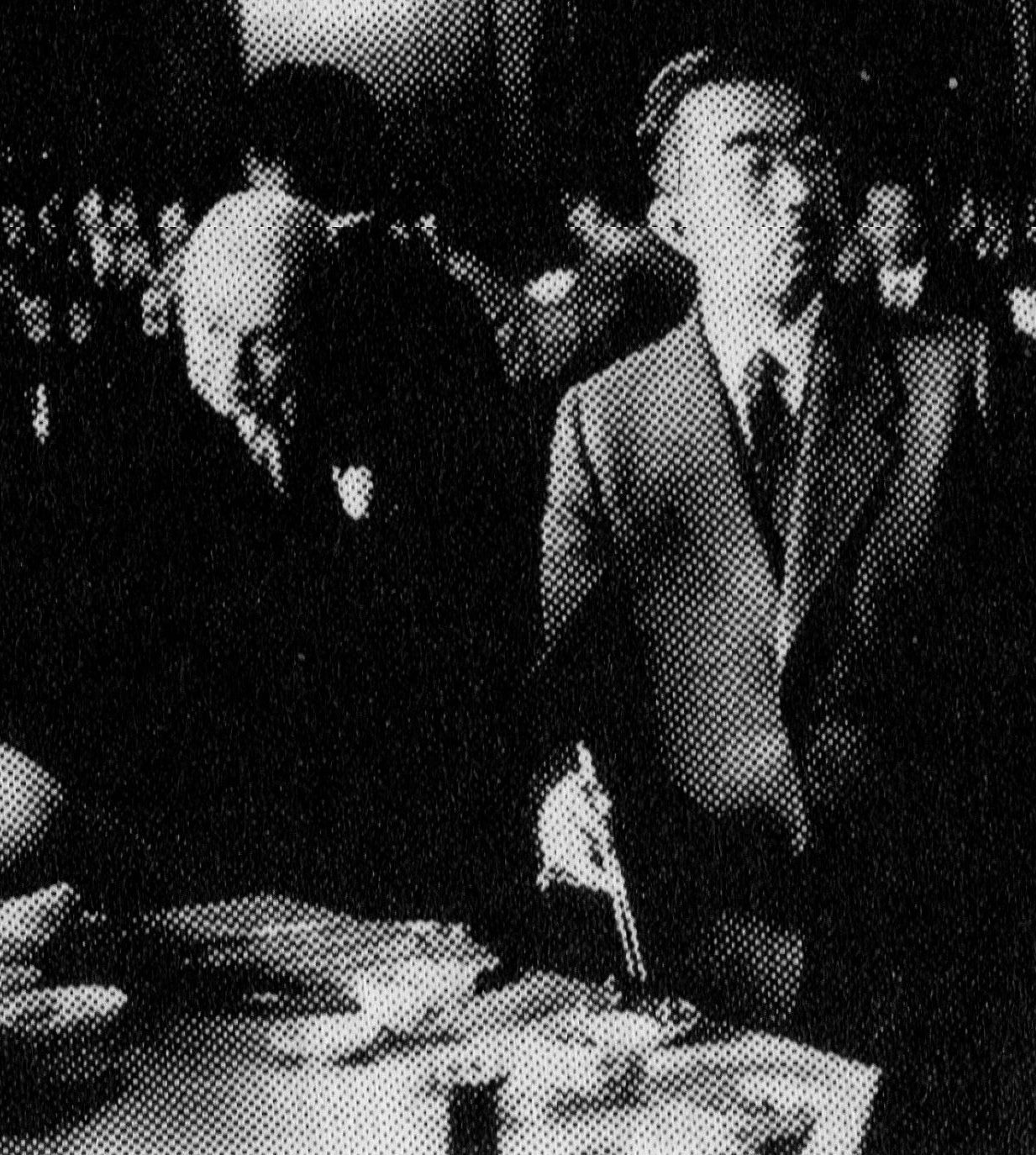
Akiyama and Emperor Hirohito in 1949

Born as Takamori Tokuzō in Echizen, Fukui, he was a mischievous teenager. His parents married him off to the wealthy Akiyama family in Sabae, where he was introduced to Western cuisine by the army chef, to whom he delivered goods. He moved to Tokyo to develop his skills, where he worked at the Peerage Hall and Tsukiji Seiyoken. He then decided to study further in Europe, travelling first to Germany in 1909 and then to France. In Paris, he worked at the Majestic Hotel and Café de Paris. In France, he had to face prejudice for being Japanese, largely due to the outcome of the Russo-Japanese War, and had to engage in physical fights in the kitchen. He also worked at Hôtel Ritz Paris under renowned French chef Auguste Escoffier.

In 1913, he was offered the position of Master Chef of the Imperial Court of Japan, thus he returned to his homeland to serve the newly crowned Emperor Taishō. He was only 25 years old when he became the emperor's master chef. His superior was Hayato Fukuba (福羽逸人, 1856–1921), Director of the Imperial Cuisine, a respected horticulture expert. In 1920, he travelled to various countries in Europe and to America to study their cuisines, also accompanying the Crown Prince (Hirohito).

He was the third owner of the Touyouken restaurant in Tokyo.

Akiyama served both Emperor Taishō and Emperor Shōwa, and retired in 1972 at the age of 83. He died two years later.

== Books ==
- AKIYAMA Tokuzō, Furansu ryōri zensho, Akiyama hensanjo shuppanbu, 1923
- Nihon shichūshi kyōdōkai (Ed.), Hyōjun Furansu ryōri zensho, Nihon shichūshi kyōdōkai, 1941

== In popular culture ==
His life was adapted into a novel titled The Emperor's Cook (天皇の料理番, Tennō no Ryōriban) by Hisahide Sugimori in 1979.

Several television series and a TV film were made about Akiyama's life:

- The Emperor's Cook (天皇の料理番, Tennō no Ryōriban), 1980, TV series, TBS
- The Emperor's Cook (天皇の料理番, Tennō no Ryōriban), 1993, TV film, TBS
- The Emperor's Cook (天皇の料理番, Tennō no Ryōriban), 2015, TV series, TBS

The latter won several accolades, including the Grand Prix and Best Actor awards (Takeru Satoh) at the International Drama Festival in Tokyo.
