= Mizuochi Station =

Railway station in Sabae, Fukui prefecture, Japan

Mizuochi Station 水落駅
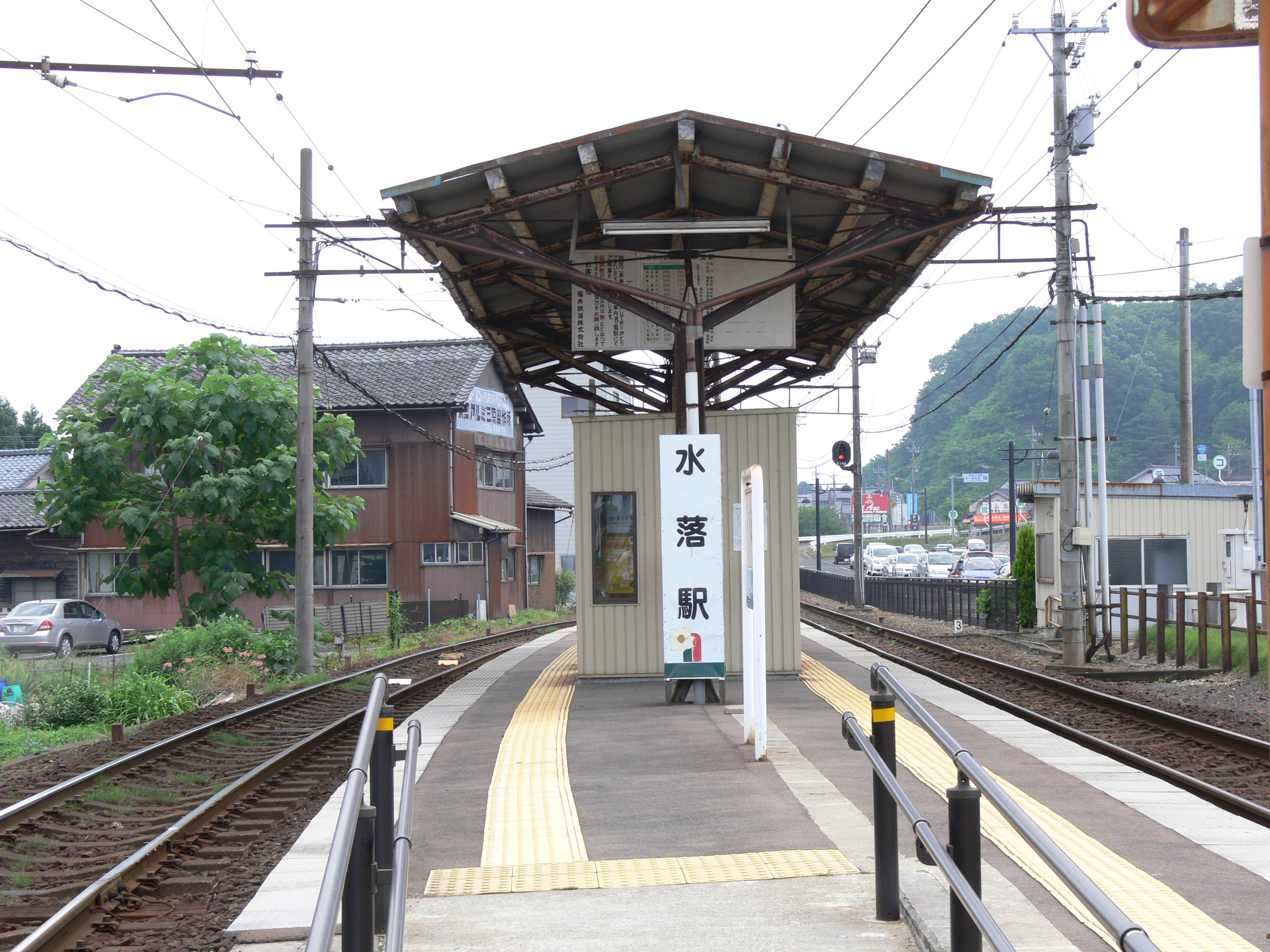
- Mizuochi Station platform

General information
- Location: 2-10-22 Mizuochi-chō, Sabae-shi, Fukui-ken 916-0022; Japan
- Coordinates: 35°57′45″N 136°10′59″E
- Operator: Fukui Railway
- Line: ■ Fukubu Line
- Distance: 7.3 km from Takefu-shin
- Platforms: 1 island platform
- Tracks: 2
- Connections

Other information
- Status: Unstaffed
- Station code: F7
- Website: Official website

History
- Opened: October 5, 1927

Passengers
- FY2015: 161
Location
- Location within Japan

Mizuochi Station (水落駅, Mizuochi-eki) is a Fukui Railway Fukubu Line railway station located in the city of Sabae, Fukui Prefecture, Japan.

== Lines ==
Shinmei Station is served by the Fukui Railway Fukubu Line, and is located 7.3 kilometers from the terminus of the line at Takefu-shin.

== Station layout ==
The station consists of one ground-level island platform connected to the station building by a level crossing. The station is unattended.

== Adjacent stations ==
«	Service	»
Fukui Railway Fukubu Line
Nishi-Sabae	Express	Shinmei
Nishiyama-Kōen	Local	Shinmei

== History ==
The station opened on October 5, 1927. Upon the closure of the Seiko Line win 1970, the transfer platform was demolished. A Free park-and-ride lot for 80 cars opened on October 1, 2004.

== Passenger statistics ==
In fiscal 2015, the station was used by an average of 161 passengers daily (boarding passengers only).

== Surrounding area ==
- Sabae Post Office
- Sabae Municipal Library
- Sabae Welfare Center
- Pacific War Memorial

== See also ==
- List of railway stations in Japan
