= Ōshio Station (Fukui) =

Railway station in Echizen, Fukui Prefecture, Japan

Ōshio Station 王子保駅
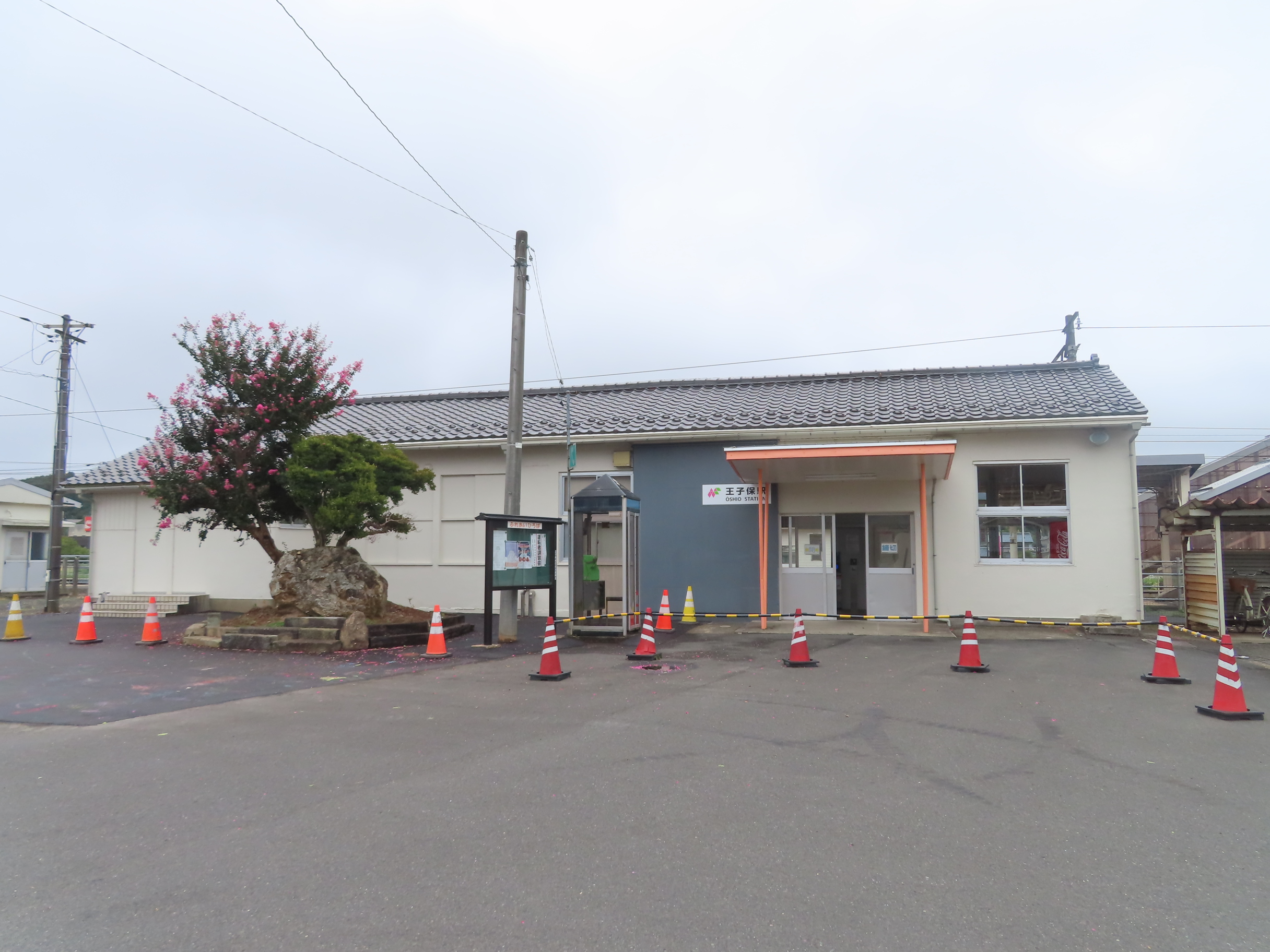
- Ōshio Station in September 2024

General information
- Location: 55-4 Shiromaru-cho, Echizen-shi, Fukui-ken 915-0857; Japan
- Coordinates: 35.8664°N 136.1654°E
- Operator: Hapi-Line Fukui
- Line: Hapi-Line Fukui Line
- Distance: 30.8km from Tsuruga
- Platforms: 2 side platforms
- Tracks: 2

Other information
- Status: Unstaffed
- Website: Official website

History
- Opened: 20 December 1927

Passengers
- FY2016: 251 daily

Services
Preceding station	Hapi-Line Fukui	Following station
Nanjō towards Tsuruga	Hapi-Line Fukui Line Local	Shikibu towards Daishōji
Location
- Location within Japan

Ōshio Station (王子保駅, Ōshio-eki) is a railway station on the Hapi-Line Fukui Line in the city of Echisen, Fukui Prefecture, Japan, operated by the Hapi-Line Fukui.

== Lines ==
Ōshio Station is served by the Hapi-Line Fukui Line, and is located 30.8 kilometers from the terminus of the line at Tsuruga.

== Station layout ==
The station consists of two opposed unnumbered ground-level side platforms connected by a level crossing. The station is unattended.

=== Platforms ===
station side	■ Hapi-Line Fukui Line	for Tsuruga and Maibara
opposite side	■ Hapi-Line Fukui Line	for Fukui and Kanazawa

== History ==
Ōshio Station opened on 20 December 1927. With the privatization of Japanese National Railways (JNR) on 1 April 1987, the station came under the control of JR West.

Effective the 16 March 2024 timetable revision, this station was transferred to the Hapi-Line Fukui Line due to the opening of the western extension of the Hokuriku Shinkansen from Kanazawa to Tsuruga.

== Passenger statistics ==
In fiscal 2016, the station was used by an average of 251 passengers daily (boarding passengers only).

== Surrounding area ==
- Takefu No.6 Middle School
- National Route 365
- National Route 8

== See also ==
- List of railway stations in Japan
