= Iehisa Station =

Railway station in Echizen, Fukui prefecture, Japan

Iehisa Station 家久駅
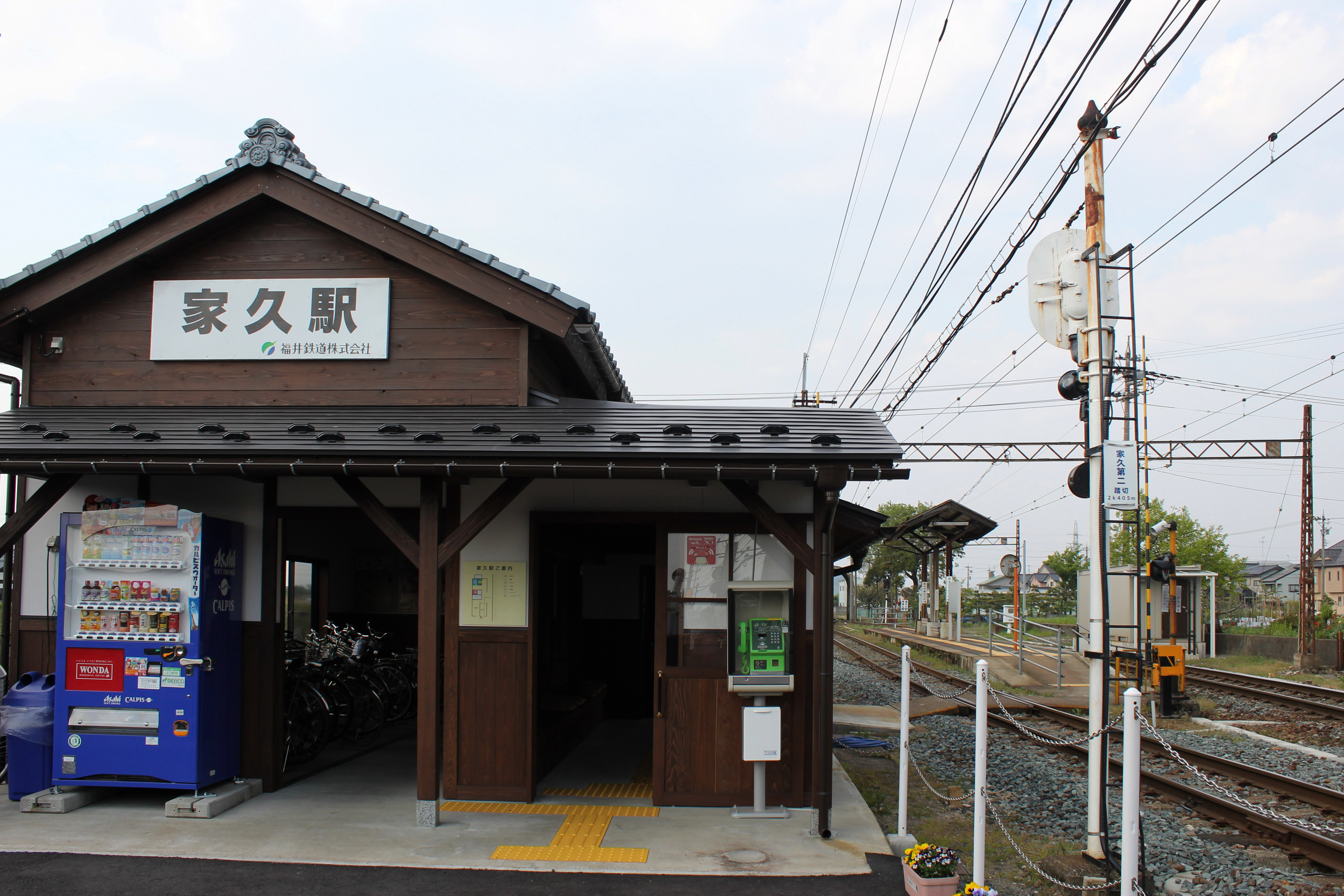
- Iehisa Station in May 2013

General information
- Location: 77-5-1 Iehisa-chō, Echizen-shi, Fukui-ken 915-0801; Japan
- Coordinates: 35°55′34″N 136°10′13″E
- Operator: Fukui Railway
- Line: ■ Fukubu Line
- Distance: 2.4 km from Takefu-shin
- Platforms: 1 island platform
- Tracks: 2
- Connections

Other information
- Status: Unstaffed
- Station code: F3
- Website: Official website

History
- Opened: February 23, 1924
Location
- Location within Japan

Iehisa Station (家久駅, Iehisa-eki) is a Fukui Railway Fukubu Line railway station located in the city of Echizen, Fukui Prefecture, Japan.

== Lines ==
Iehisa Station is served by the Fukui Railway Fukubu Line, and is located 2.4 kilometers from the terminus of the line at Takefu-shin.

== Station layout ==
The station consists of one ground-level island platform connected to the wooden station building by a level crossing. The station is unattended.

== Adjacent stations ==
«	Service	»
Fukui Railway Fukubu Line
Express: Does not stop at this station
Sports Kōen	Local	Sundome Nishi

== History ==
The station opened on February 23, 1924

== Surrounding area ==
The station is located on the east bank of the Yoshinose River and serves a predominantly residential area. Takefu Commercial High School is also nearby.

== See also ==
- List of railway stations in Japan
