= Kawake Station =

Railway station in Nagahama, Shiga Prefecture, Japan

Kawake Station 河毛駅
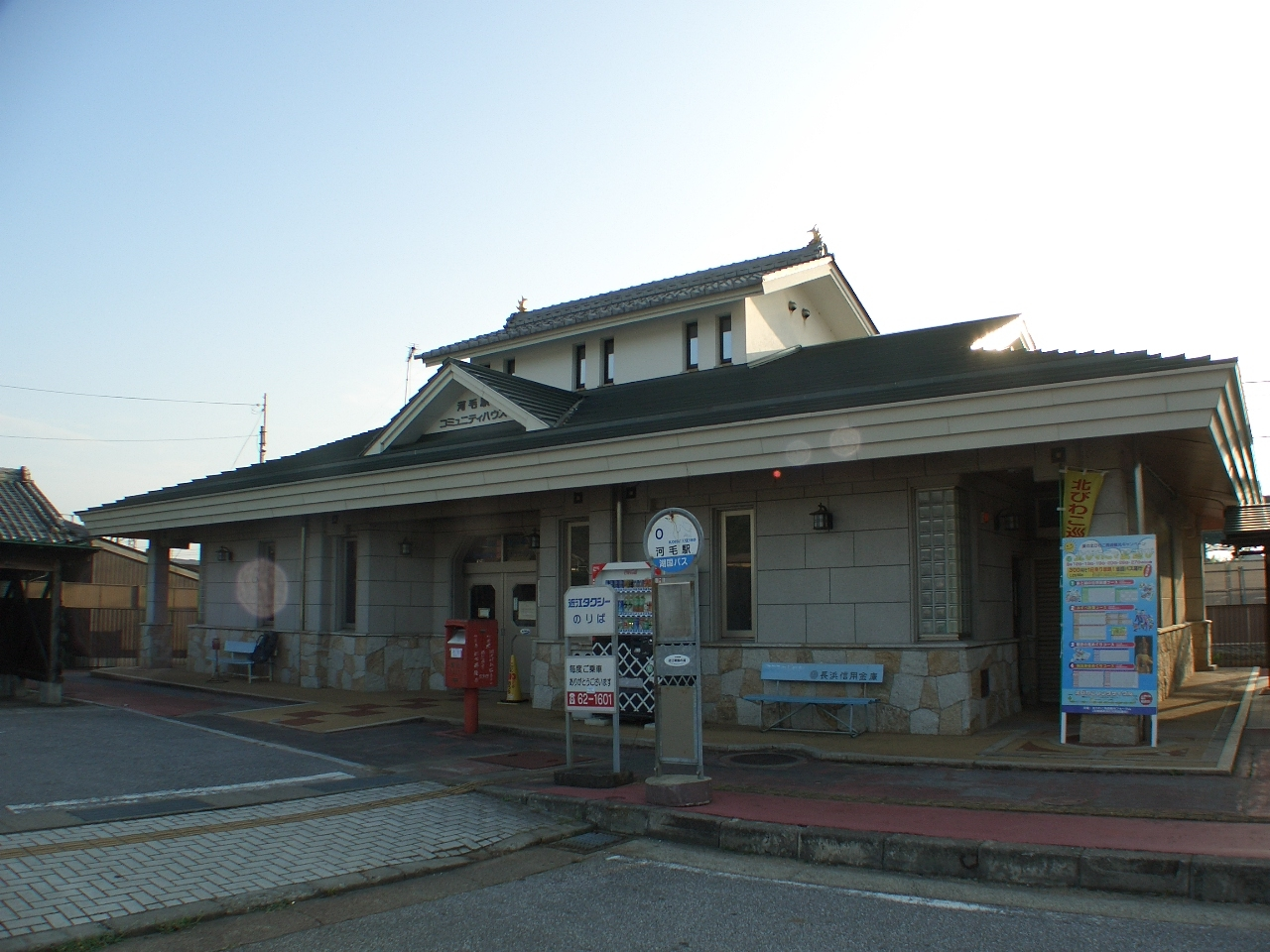
- Kawake Station, August 2006

General information
- Location: Yamawaki 560, Kohoku-cho, Nagahama-shi, Shiga-ken 529-0317; Japan
- Coordinates: 35°26′54.33″N 136°14′58.27″E
- System: JR-West regional rail station
- Operator: JR West
- Line: Hokuriku Main Line
- Distance: 15.6 km from Maibara
- Platforms: 2 side platforms

Other information
- Station code: JR-A07
- Website: Official website

History
- Opened: 10 March 1882; 144 years ago
- Closed: 1886–1954

Passengers
- FY 2023: 968 daily
Location
- Location within Shiga Prefecture Location within Japan

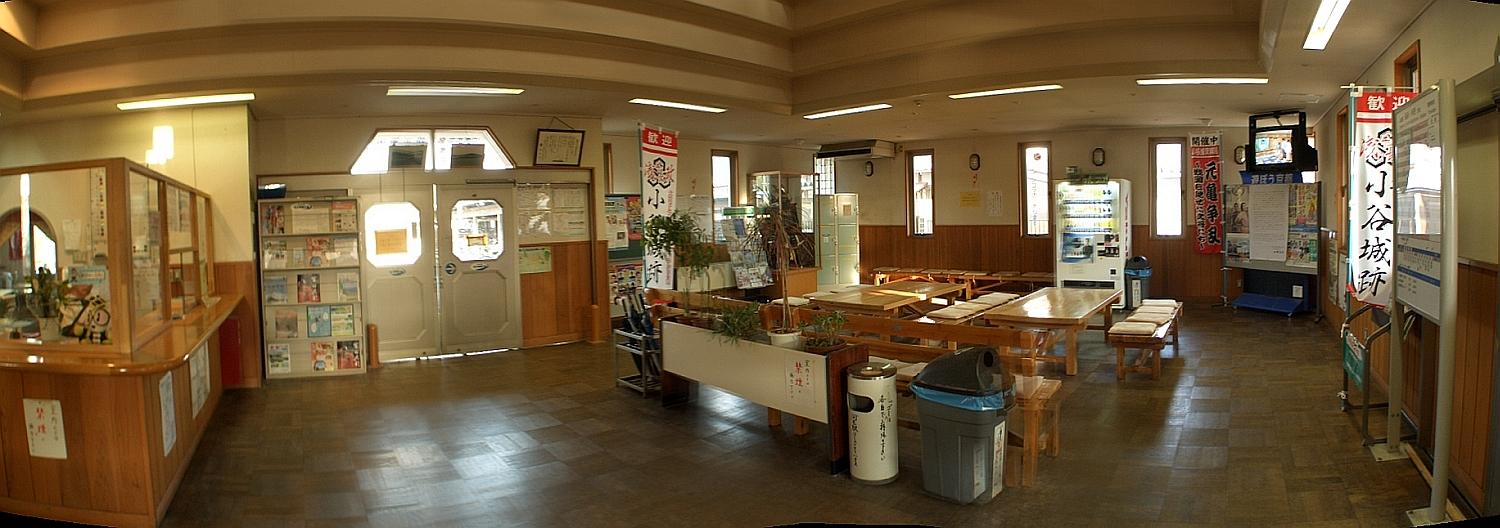
Station interior

Kawake Station (河毛駅, Kawake-eki) is a passenger railway station located in the city of Nagahama, Shiga, Japan, operated by the West Japan Railway Company (JR West).

== Lines ==
Kawake Station is served by the Hokuriku Main Line, and is 15.6 kilometers from the terminus of the line at Maibara.

== Station layout ==
The station consists of two opposed side platforms connected by both a footbridge and a level crossing. The station is staffed.

== Platform ==
| 1 | ■ Hokuriku Main Line | for Maibara and Kyoto |
| 2 | ■ Hokuriku Main Line | for Ōmi-Shiotsu, Tsuruga |

== Adjacent stations ==
| « | Service | » |
Hokuriku Main Line
Special Rapid: Does not stop at this station
Limited Express "Hida": Does not stop at this station
| Torahime | Local | Takatsuki |

== History ==
The station opened on 10 March 1882 on the Japanese Government Railway (JGR) Hokuriku Main Line, but was closed on May 1, 1886. The station reopened as a station on the Japan National Railway (JNR) on 1 August 1954. It came under the aegis of the West Japan Railway Company (JR West) on 1 April 1987 due to the privatization of Japan National Railway.

Station numbering was introduced in March 2018 with Kawake being assigned station number JR-A07.

== Passenger statistics ==
In fiscal 2019, the station was used by an average of 528 passengers daily (boarding passengers only).

== Surrounding area ==
- Odani Castle ruins
- Yamamotoyama Castle ruins
- Wakamiyayama Kofun
- Nagahama City Office Kohoku Branch

== See also ==
- List of railway stations in Japan
