= Torahime Station =

Railway station in Nagahama, Shiga Prefecture, Japan

Torahime Station 虎姫駅
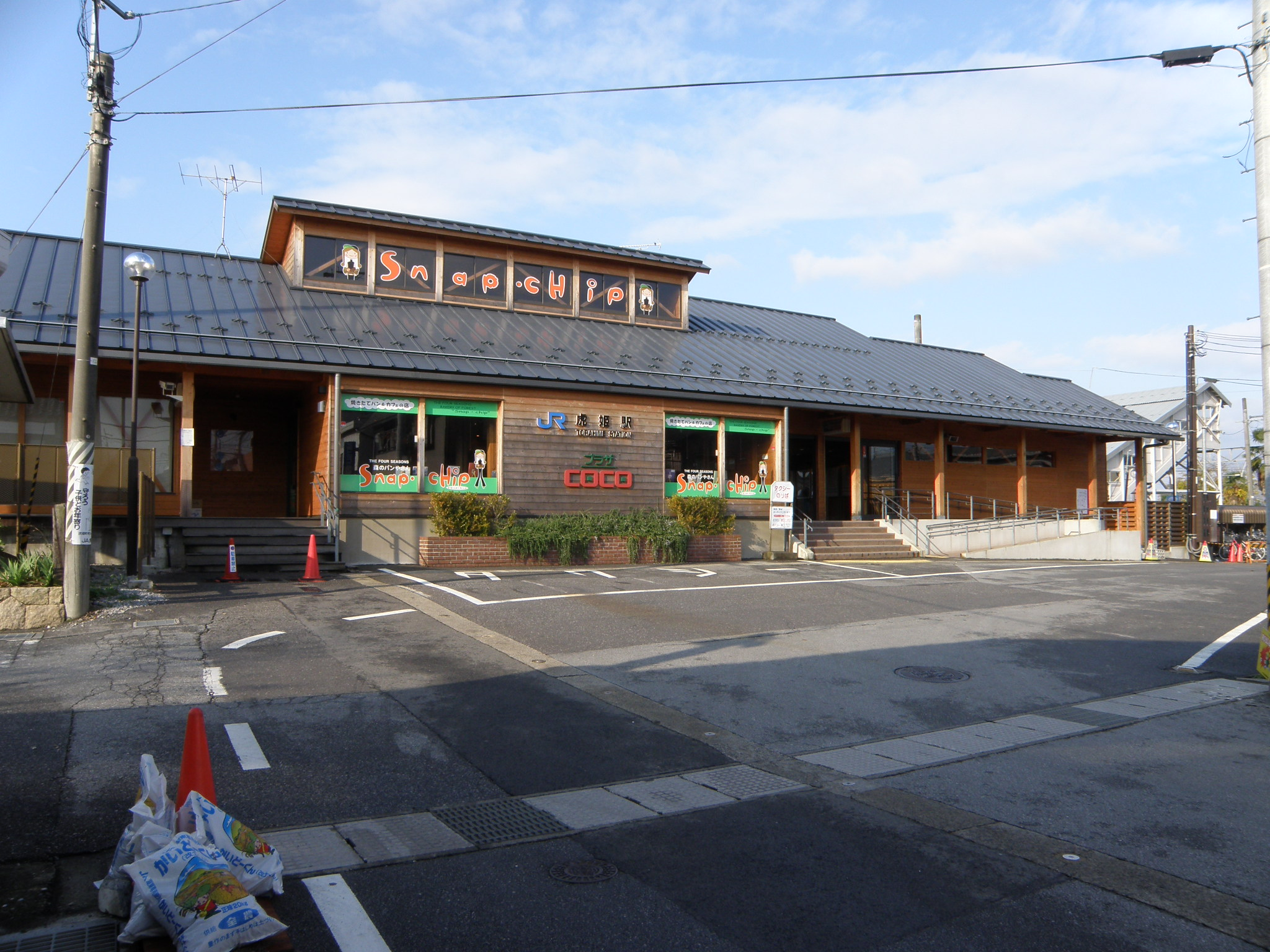
- Torahime Station, November 2009

General information
- Location: 1042 Hosoda, Daiji-cho, Nagahama City, Shiga Prefecture 529-0144; Japan
- Coordinates: 35.4244°N 136.2576°E
- Operator: JR West
- Line: A Hokuriku Main Line
- Distance: 12.8 km (8.0 mi) from Maibara
- Platforms: 2 side platforms
- Tracks: 2

Construction
- Structure type: Ground level

Other information
- Station code: JR-A08
- Website: Official website

History
- Opened: 1 June 1902; 124 years ago

Passengers
- FY 2023: 1,394 daily

Services
Preceding station	JR West	Following station
Shin-Hikida towards Maibara	Hokuriku Main Line Local	Minami-Imajō towards Tsuruga
Shin-Hikida towards Kyoto	Kosei Line Local Rapid Special Rapid	Terminus
Location
- Location within Shiga Prefecture Location within Kansai region Location within Japan

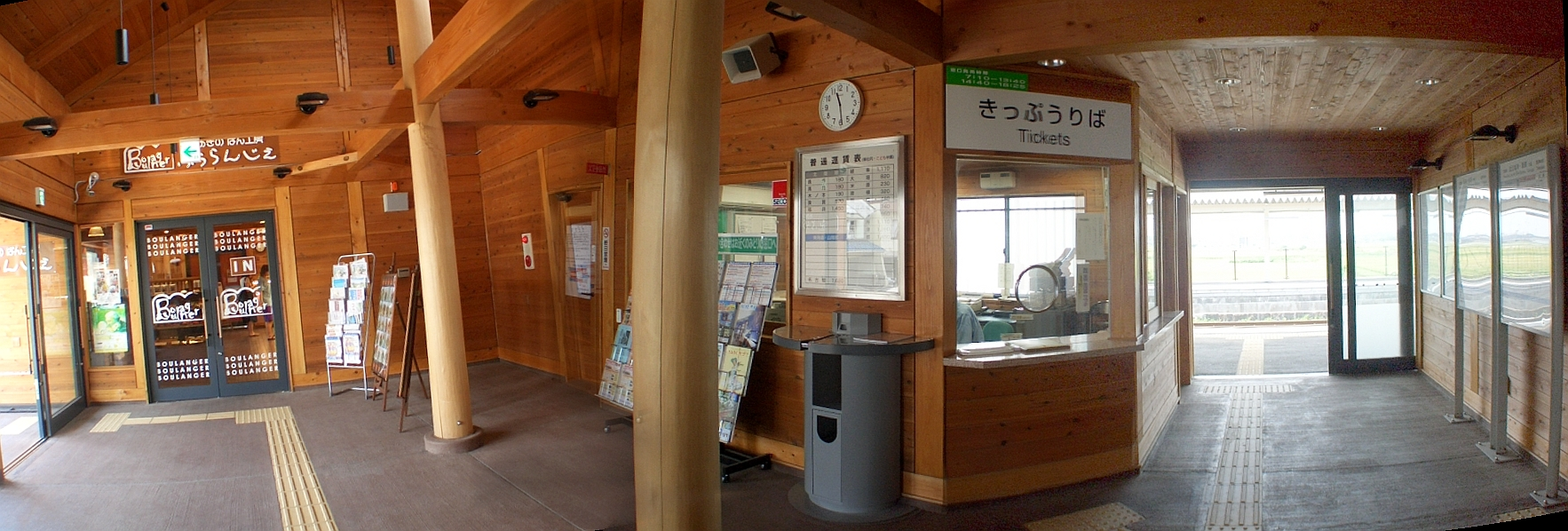
Station interior

Torahime Station (虎姫駅, Torahime-eki) is a passenger railway station located in the city of Nagahama, Shiga, Japan, operated by the West Japan Railway Company (JR West).

== Lines ==
Torahime Station is served by the Hokuriku Main Line, and is 12.8 kilometers from the terminus of the line at Maibara.

== Station layout ==
The station consists of two opposed side platforms connected by a footbridge. The station is staffed.

== Platform ==
1	■ Hokuriku Main Line	for Maibara and Kyoto
2	■ Hokuriku Main Line	for Ōmi-Shiotsu, Tsuruga

== History ==
Torahime station opened on 1 June 1902 on the Japanese Government Railway (JGR) Hokuriku Main Line. The station came under the aegis of the West Japan Railway Company (JR West) on April 1, 1987, due to the privatization of Japan National Railway.

Station numbering was introduced in March 2018 with Torahime being assigned station number JR-A08.

== Passenger statistics ==
In fiscal 2019, the station was used by an average of 709 passengers daily (boarding passengers only).

== Surrounding area ==
- former Torahime Town Office
- Nagahamashi City Torahime Library
- Nagahama City Torahime Cultural Hall (Suisenkan)
- Shiga Prefectural Torahime High School

== See also ==
- List of railway stations in Japan
