= 521 series =

Japanese electric multiple unit train type

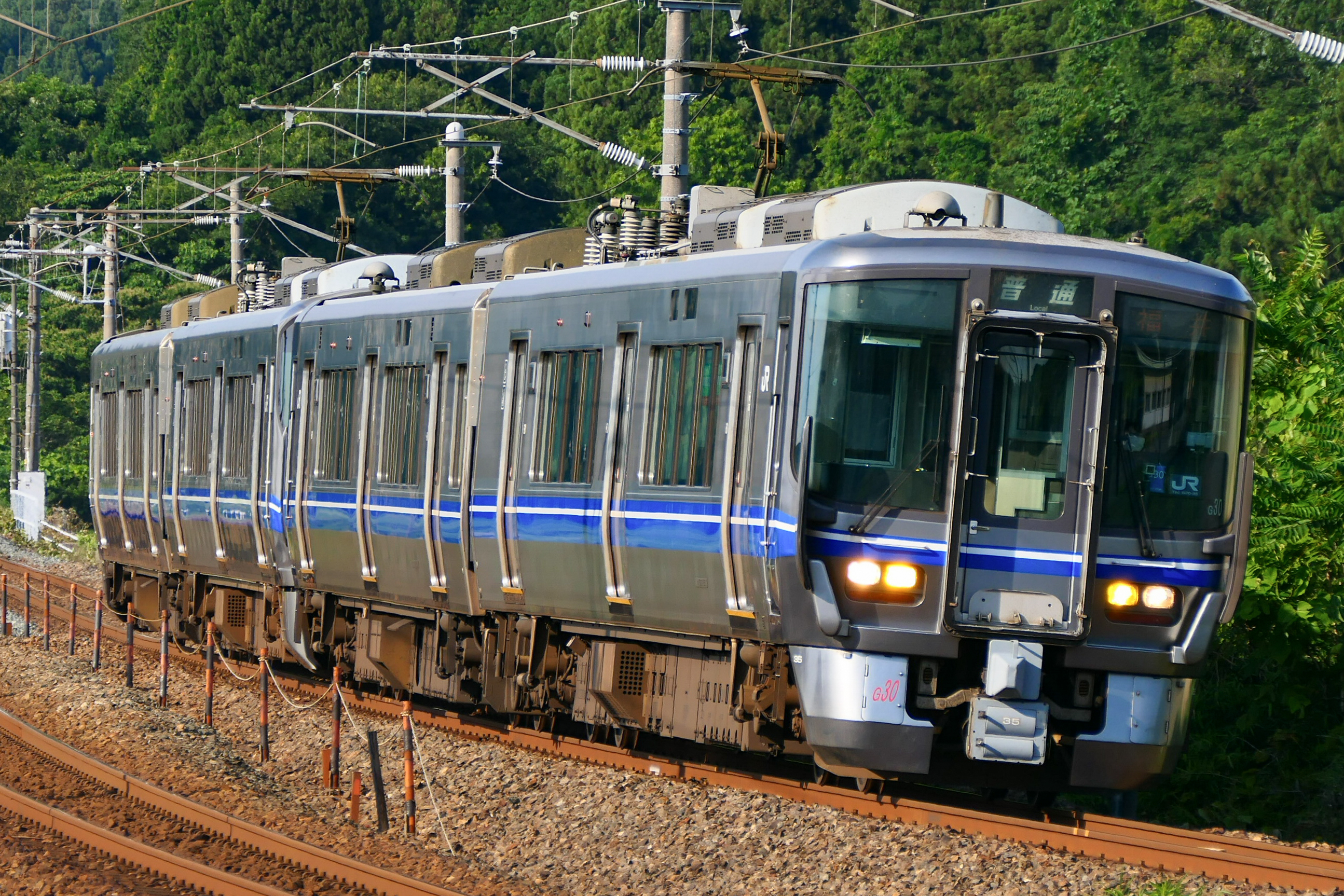
- A JR West 521-0 series EMU first build train
- Manufacturers: Kawasaki Heavy Industries; Kinki Sharyo
- Replaced: 419 series; 413 series; 415 series; 457 series; 475 series
- Constructed: 2006–
- Entered service: November 2006
- Number built: 164 vehicles (82 sets)
- Number in service: 160 vehicles (80 sets) (as of 1 April 2021)
- Formation: 2 cars per trainset
- Fleet numbers: E01–E05; G01–G30; J01–J23; U01–U15
- Operators: JR West; Hapi-Line Fukui; IR Ishikawa Railway; Ainokaze Toyama Railway
- Depots: Tsuruga, Kanazawa
- Lines served: Hokuriku Main Line; Hapi-Line Fukui Line; Kosei Line; Nanao Line; IR Ishikawa Railway Line; Ainokaze Toyama Railway Line; Echigo Tokimeki Railway Nihonkai Hisui Line

Specifications
- Car body construction: Stainless steel
- Car length: 20,100 mm (65 ft 11 in)
- Width: 2,950 mm (9 ft 8 in)
- Height: 3,630 mm (11 ft 11 in)
- Floor height: 1,120 mm (3 ft 8 in)
- Doors: 3 pairs per side
- Maximum speed: 120 km/h (75 mph)
- Traction system: Variable frequency (3-level IGBT)
- Power output: 230 kW (308 hp) per motor
- Electric systems: 1,500 V DC / 20 kV 60 Hz AC (overhead line)
- Current collection: WPS28D single-arm pantograph
- Bogies: WDT59B (motored), WTR243C (trailer)
- Braking systems: Electronically controlled pneumatic brakes with regenerative braking, snow-resistant brake
- Safety systems: ATS-SW, ATS-P
- Coupling system: Shibata type
- Track gauge: 1,067 mm (3 ft 6 in)

The 521 series (521系, 521-kei) is a dual-voltage AC/DC outer-suburban electric multiple unit (EMU) train type operated by West Japan Railway Company (JR West), along with third-sector railway operators Hapi-Line Fukui (as of March 2024), IR Ishikawa Railway, and Ainokaze Toyama Railway on local services in the Fukui, Kanazawa, and Toyama areas.

== Design ==
The 521 series was the first dual-voltage suburban EMU type to be built for JR West. The body of the first two batches was based on the 223-5000 series suburban EMU design, with the same WMT102C 230 kW (308 hp) traction motors. The sets are able to be used on wanman driver-only operation services.

== Operations ==
=== JR West ===
- 521-0 series
  - Hokuriku Main Line (Maibara – Tsuruga)
  - Kosei Line (Ōmi-Imazu – Ōmi-Shiotsu)
  - Obama Line (Tsuruga – Higashi-Maizuru, sometimes substituted for 125 series)
- 521-100 series
  - Nanao Line (from 3 October 2020)

=== Third-sector lines ===
- Hapi-Line Fukui Line
- IR Ishikawa Railway Line
- Ainokaze Toyama Railway Line
- Echigo Tokimeki Railway Nihonkai Hisui Line

== Fleet ==
As of 1 October 2024, JR West operates 20 two-car sets (E01-E05, U01-U15), allocated to Kanazawa depot and Tsuruga depot. The Ainokaze Toyama Railway operates 22 two-car sets (AK01-AK22), the IR Ishikawa Railway operates 24 two-car sets (IR01-IR24), and the Hapi-Line Fukui operates 16 two-car sets (HF01-HF16).

=== JR West ===
As of 1 October 2024, the JR West 521 series fleet is as follows.

==== 521-0 series (Hokuriku Main Line sets) ====
Set No.	Manufacturer	Delivery date
E01	Kawasaki Heavy Industries	28 September 2006
E02	Kawasaki Heavy Industries	12 October 2006
E03	Kawasaki Heavy Industries	12 October 2006
E04	Kawasaki Heavy Industries	12 October 2006
E05	Kinki Sharyo	24 October 2006

==== 521-100 series (Nanao Line sets) ====
Set No.	Manufacturer	Delivery date
U01	Kinki Sharyo	25 December 2019
U02	Kinki Sharyo	25 December 2019
U03	Kinki Sharyo	25 December 2019
U04	Kinki Sharyo	16 July 2020
U05	Kinki Sharyo	16 July 2020
U06	Kinki Sharyo	16 July 2020
U07	Kinki Sharyo	6 August 2020
U08	Kinki Sharyo	6 August 2020
U09	Kinki Sharyo	6 August 2020
U10	Kinki Sharyo	10 September 2020
U11	Kinki Sharyo	10 September 2020
U12	Kinki Sharyo	10 September 2020
U13	Kinki Sharyo	27 October 2020
U14	Kinki Sharyo	27 October 2020
U15	Kinki Sharyo	27 October 2020

=== Ainokaze Toyama Railway ===
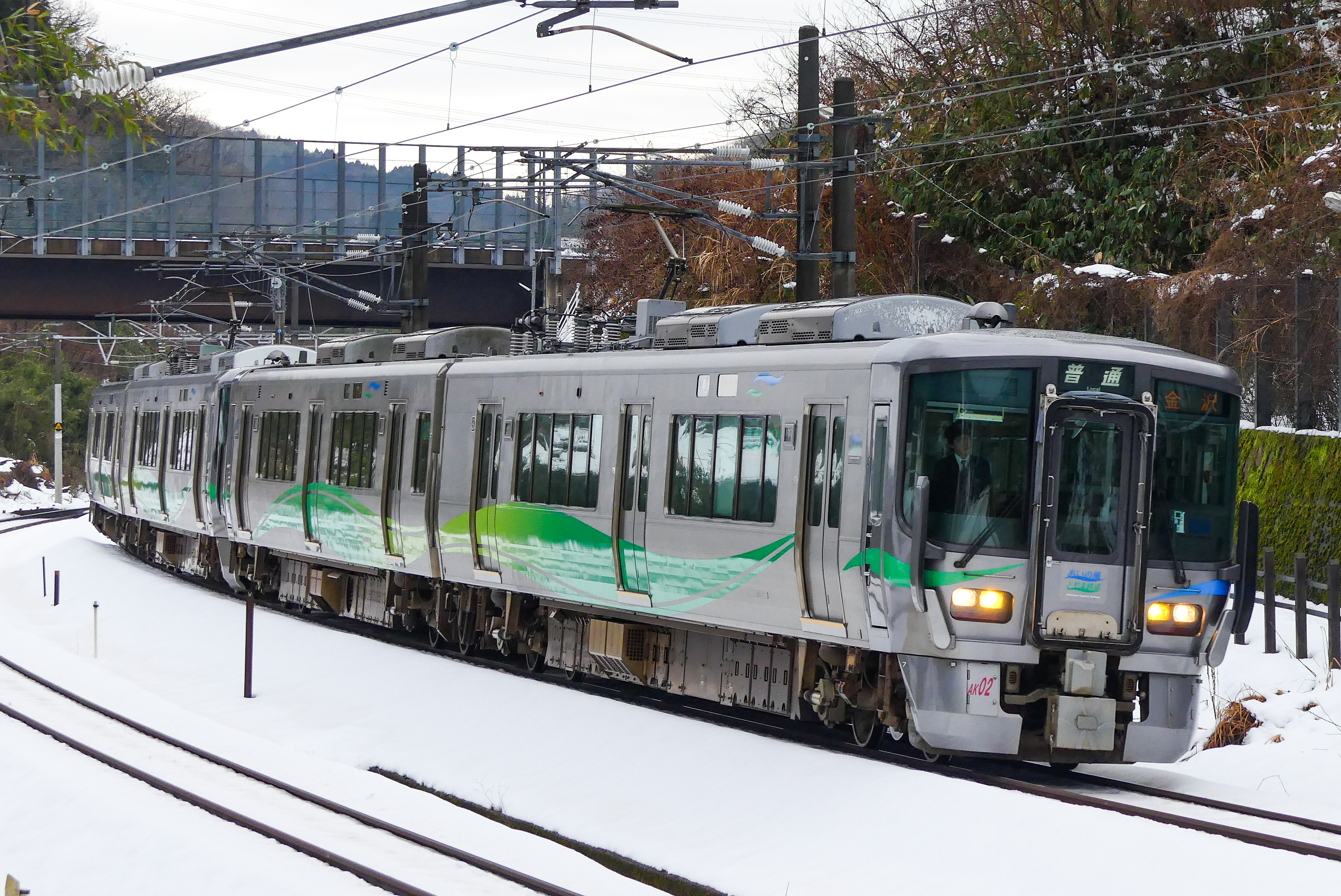
Ainokaze Toyama Railway 521 series set AK02 in January 2018

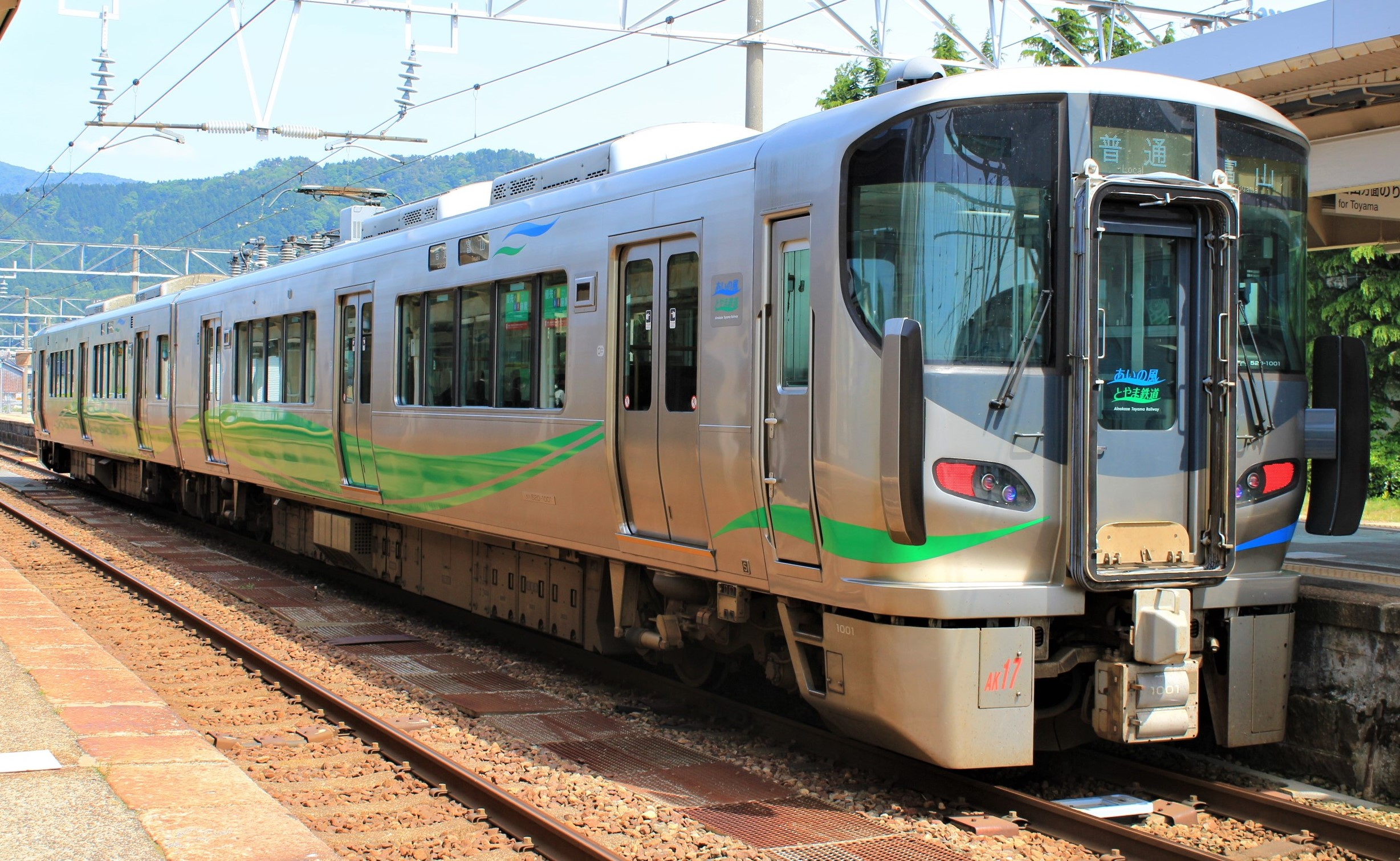
Ainokaze Toyama Railway 521 series set AK17 in May 2021

As of 1 October 2024, the Ainokaze Toyama Railway 521 series fleet is as follows.

Set No.	Former set No.	Manufacturer	Delivery date
AK01	G06	Kinki Sharyo	27 October 2009
AK02	G07	Kinki Sharyo	27 October 2009
AK03	G08	Kinki Sharyo	22 December 2009
AK04	G09	Kinki Sharyo	22 December 2009
AK05	G11	Kinki Sharyo	15 February 2010
AK06	G12	Kinki Sharyo	15 February 2010
AK07	G13	Kinki Sharyo	2 March 2010
AK08	G15	Kinki Sharyo	2 March 2010
AK09	G16	Kawasaki Heavy Industries	18 December 2010
AK10	G17	Kawasaki Heavy Industries	18 December 2010
AK11	G18	Kawasaki Heavy Industries	18 December 2010
AK12	G21	Kawasaki Heavy Industries	12 January 2011
AK13	G23	Kawasaki Heavy Industries	26 January 2011
AK14	G24	Kawasaki Heavy Industries	26 January 2011
AK15	G31	Kawasaki Heavy Industries	24 February 2011
AK16	G32	Kawasaki Heavy Industries	24 February 2011
AK17	–	Kawasaki Heavy Industries	11 January 2018
AK18	–	Kawasaki Heavy Industries	4 March 2020
AK19	–	Kawasaki Heavy Industries	8 March 2021
AK20	–	Kawasaki Heavy Industries	21 February 2022
AK21	–	Kawasaki Heavy Industries	20 February 2023
AK22	–	Kawasaki Heavy Industries	20 February 2023

Five new two-car 521-1000 series sets are scheduled to be introduced over a period of six years, with the first set delivered in December 2017. These sets are based on the JR West 3rd-batch design, and are intended to replace the operator's ageing 413 series EMUs. On 22 June 2023, it was announced that some of the two-car sets would be lengthened to three cars each in the future after fiscal 2025 to increase transportation capacity on the Ainokaze Toyama Railway Line.

Sets AK21 and AK22 were delivered in February 2023.

=== IR Ishikawa Railway ===
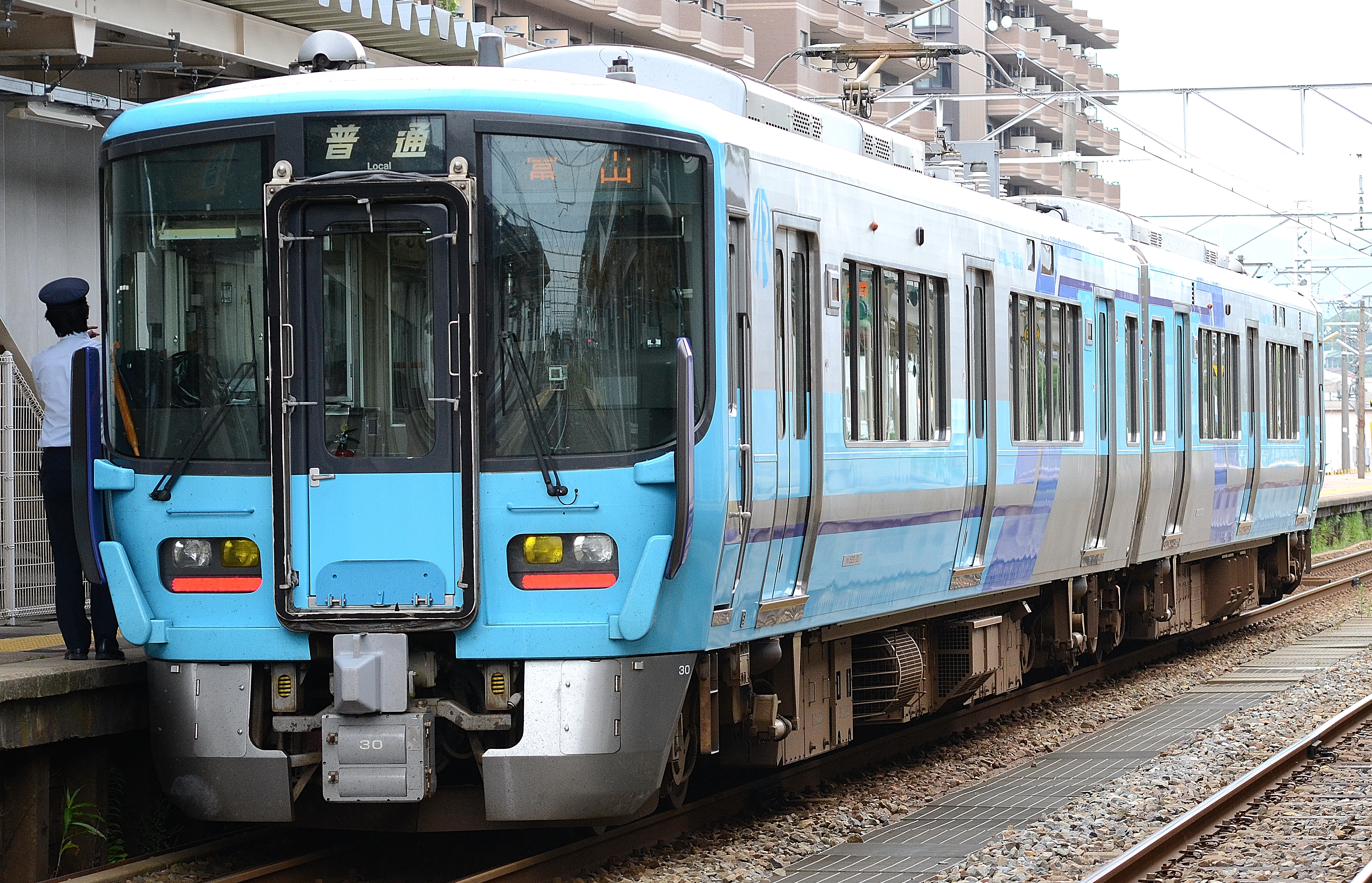
IR Ishikawa Railway 521 series set IR03 in June 2015

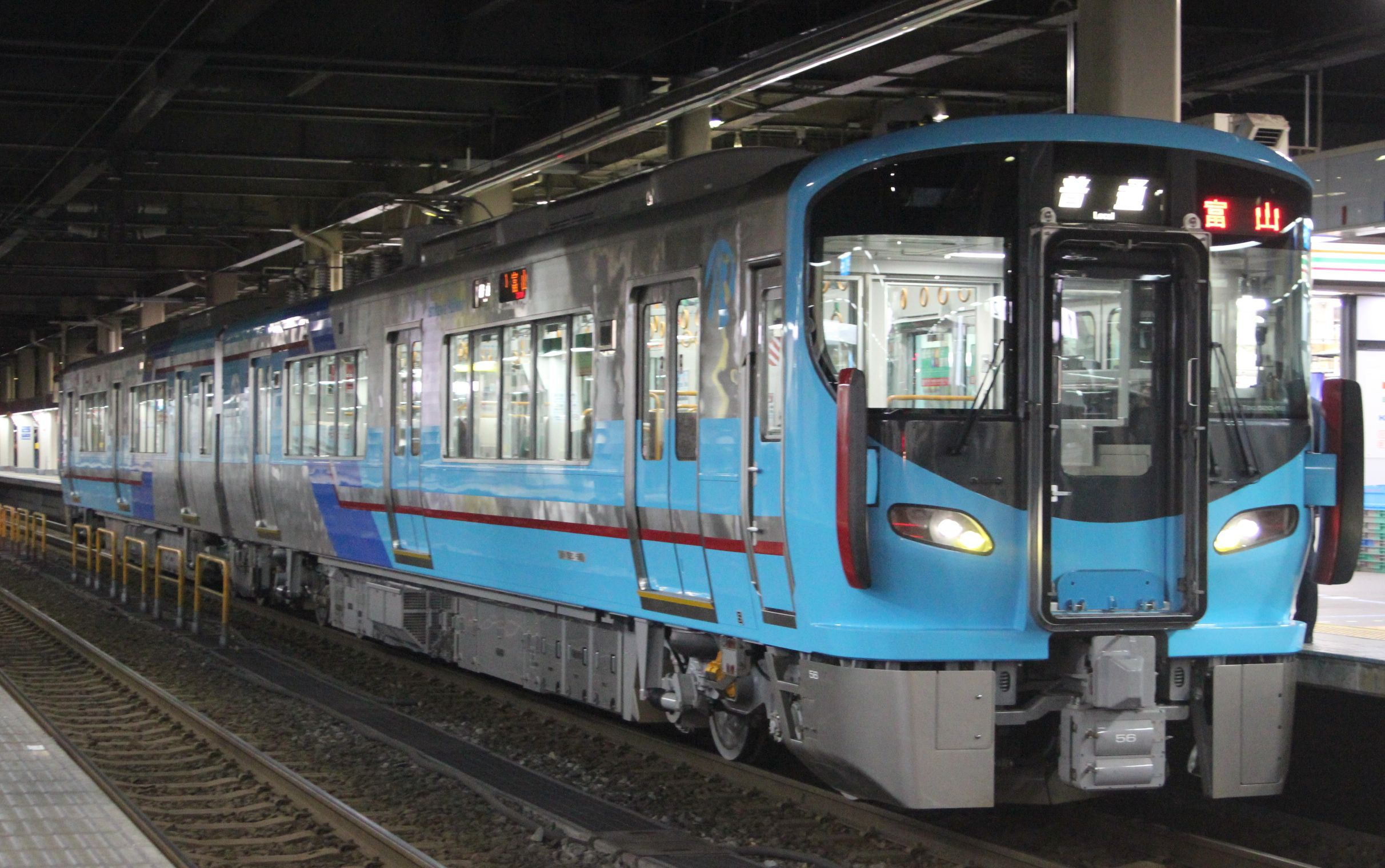
A later-build IR Ishikawa Railway 521 series set IR05 in March 2015

As of 1 October 2024, the IR Ishikawa Railway 521 series fleet is as follows.

Set No.	Former set No.	Manufacturer	Delivery date	Livery accent colour
IR01	G10	Kinki Sharyo	22 December 2009	■ Light green
IR02	G14	Kinki Sharyo	2 March 2010	■ Purple
IR03	G30	Kawasaki Heavy Industries	15 February 2011	■ Indigo
IR04	J20	Kinki Sharyo	6 February 2015	■ Ochre
IR05	J21	Kinki Sharyo	6 February 2015	■ Maroon
IR06	–	Kinki Sharyo	3 December 2020	–
IR07	–	Kinki Sharyo	3 December 2020	–
IR08	–	Kinki Sharyo	3 December 2020	–
IR09	G14	Kawasaki Heavy Industries	12 January 2011	■ Light green
IR10	G15	Kawasaki Heavy Industries	12 January 2011	■ Light green
IR11	G17	Kawasaki Heavy Industries	26 January 2011	■ Light green
IR12	G21	Kawasaki Heavy Industries	4 February 2011	■ Purple
IR13	G23	Kawasaki Heavy Industries	15 February 2011	■ Purple
IR14	G29	Kawasaki Heavy Industries	8 March 2011	■ Purple
IR15	J02	Kinki Sharyo	6 November 2013	■ Indigo
IR16	J04	Kinki Sharyo	11 December 2013	■ Indigo
IR17	J05	Kinki Sharyo	11 December 2013	■ Indigo
IR18	J06	Kinki Sharyo	11 December 2013	■ Maroon
IR19	J07	Kinki Sharyo	22 January 2014	■ Maroon
IR20	J08	Kinki Sharyo	22 January 2014	■ Maroon
IR21	J17	Kawasaki Heavy Industries	21 February 2014	■ Ochre
IR22	J18	Kawasaki Heavy Industries	21 February 2014	■ Ochre
IR23	J19	Kawasaki Heavy Industries	21 February 2014	■ Ochre
IR24	J22	Kawasaki Heavy Industries	1 April 2021	■ Ochre

=== Hapi-Line Fukui ===
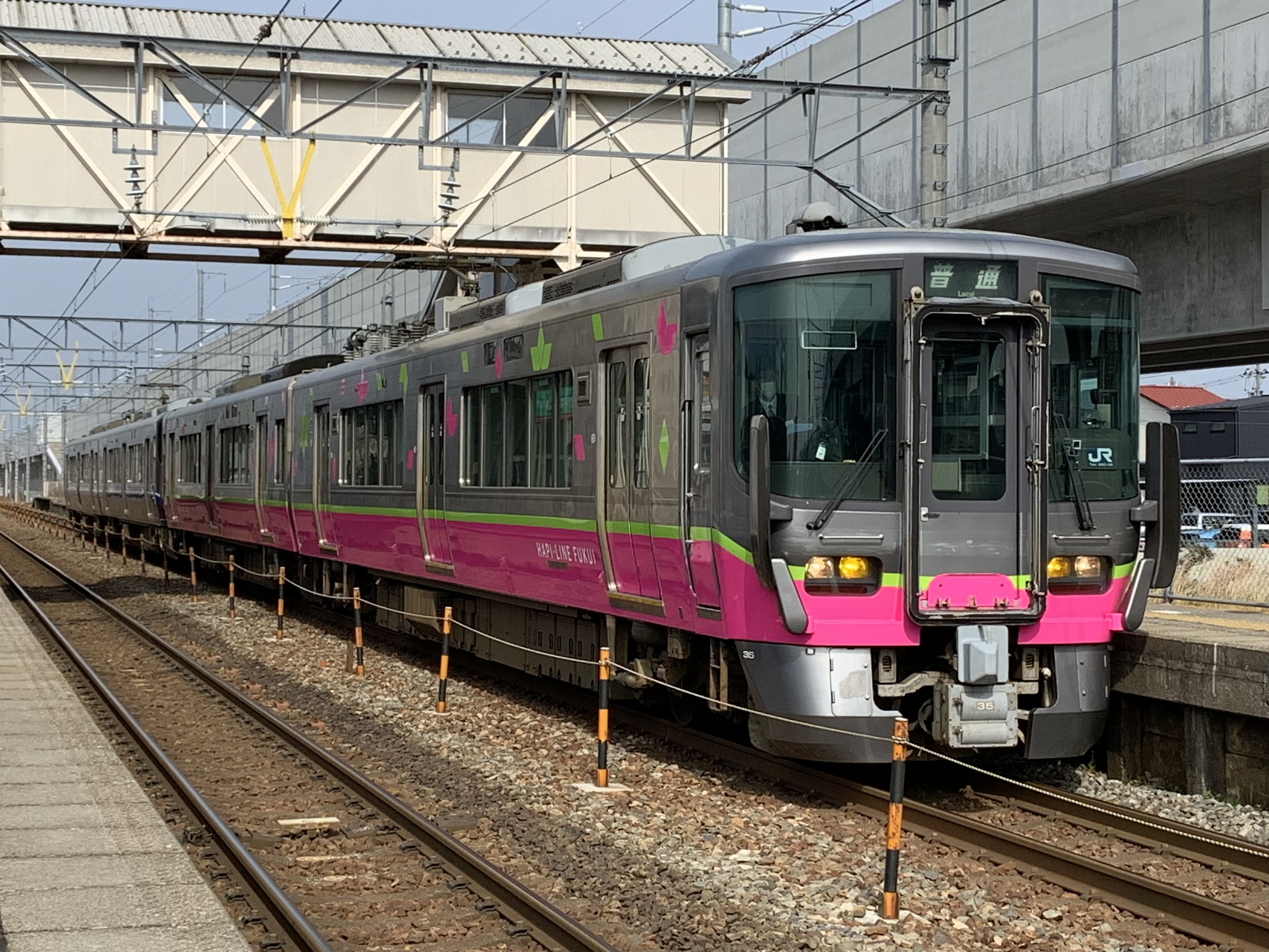
Hapi-Line Fukui 521 series set HF05 in March 2024

15 more two-car 521 series sets were transferred to the third-sector railway operating company Hapi-Line Fukui for use from 16 March 2024 when JR West handed over ownership of the sections of the Hokuriku Main Line in Fukui Prefecture running parallel to the extension of the Hokuriku Shinkansen from Kanazawa to Tsuruga.

As of 1 October 2024, the Hapi-Line Fukui 521 series fleet is as follows.

Set No.	Former set No.	Manufacturer	Delivery date
HF01	G20	Kawasaki Heavy Industries	4 February 2011
HF02	G22	Kawasaki Heavy Industries	4 February 2011
HF03	G24	Kawasaki Heavy Industries	15 February 2011
HF04	G28	Kawasaki Heavy Industries	24 February 2011
HF05	G30	Kawasaki Heavy Industries	8 March 2011
HF06	J01	Kinki Sharyo	6 November 2013
HF07	J03	Kinki Sharyo	6 November 2013
HF08	J09	Kinki Sharyo	8 January 2014
HF09	J10	Kinki Sharyo	8 January 2014
HF10	J11	Kinki Sharyo	8 January 2014
HF11	J12	Kawasaki Heavy Industries	27 January 2014
HF12	J13	Kawasaki Heavy Industries	27 January 2014
HF13	J14	Kinki Sharyo	4 March 2014
HF14	J15	Kinki Sharyo	4 March 2014
HF15	J16	Kinki Sharyo	4 March 2014
HF16	J23	Kawasaki Heavy Industries	1 April 2021

== Formations ==
Sets consist of one motored and one non-powered trailer car, and are formed as follows.

Designation	Mc	Tpc'
Numbering	KuMoHa 521	KuHa 520
Capacity (total/seated)	129/48	129/40
Weight	43.2 t	44.3 t

The KuHa 520 cars are each fitted with one WPD28D single-arm pantograph.

== Interior ==
Seating is arranged as 2+2 abreast transverse flip-over seats. The KuHa 520 cars include a toilet.

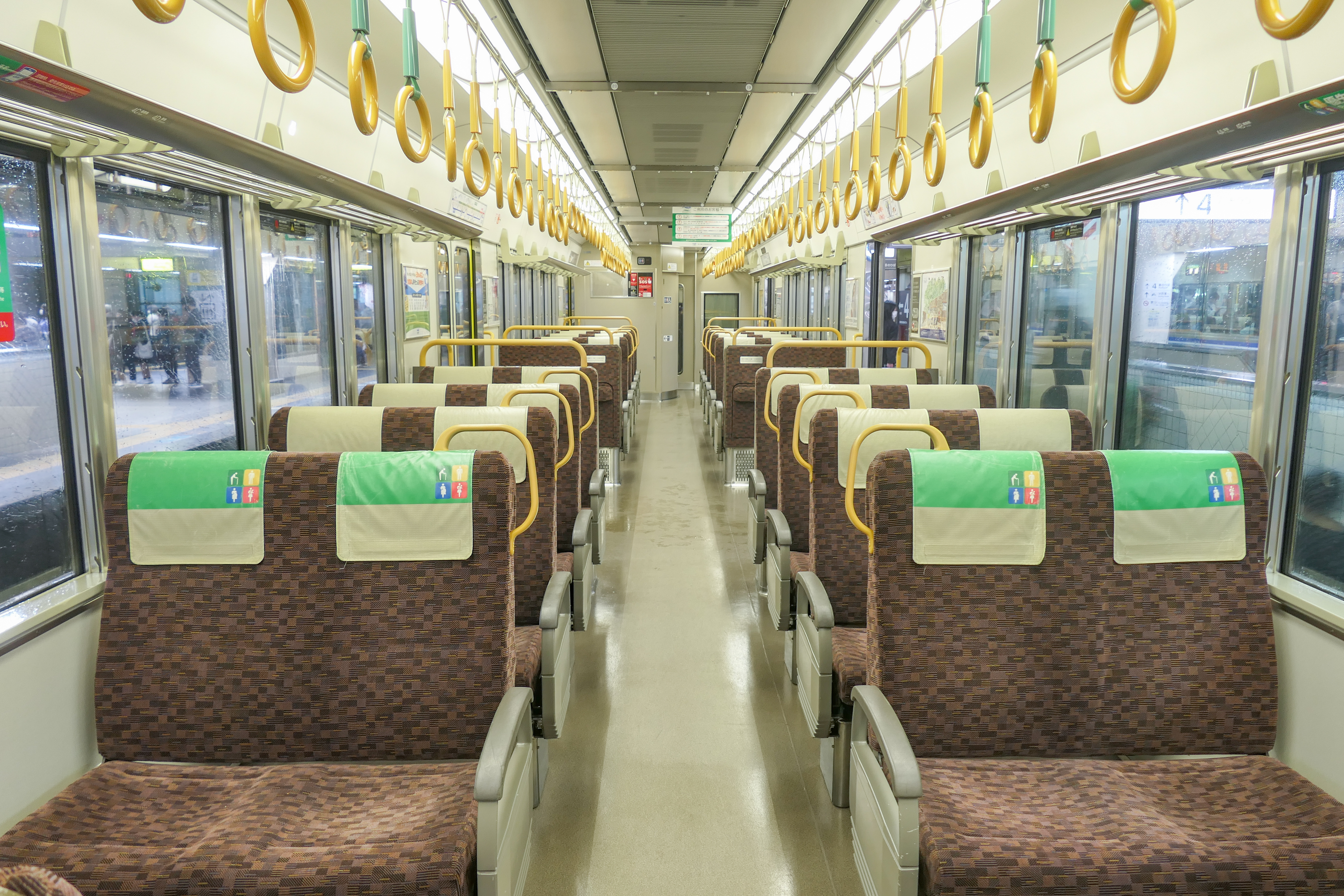
Interior of a 2nd-batch set in April 2022

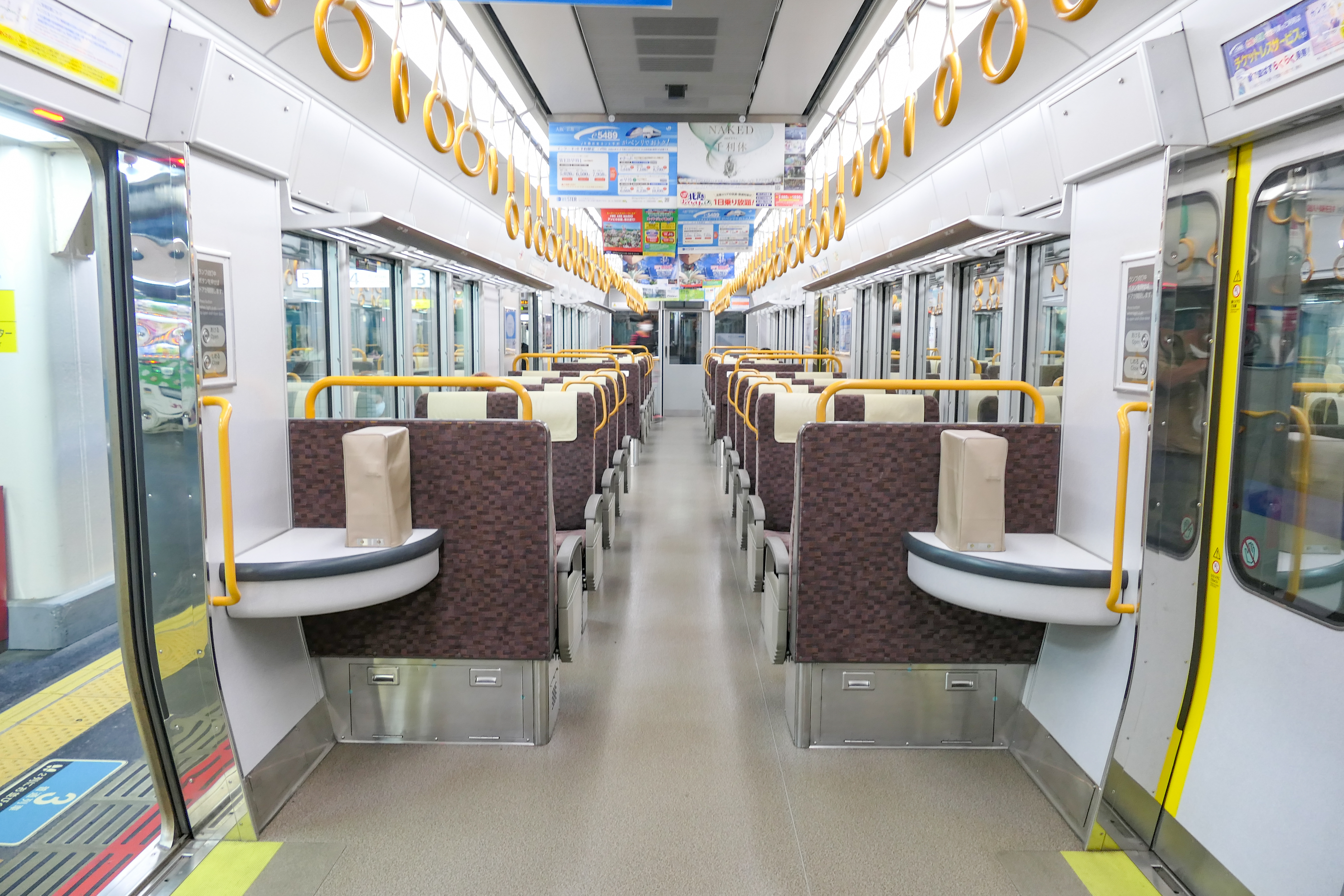
Interior of a 3rd-batch set in July 2022

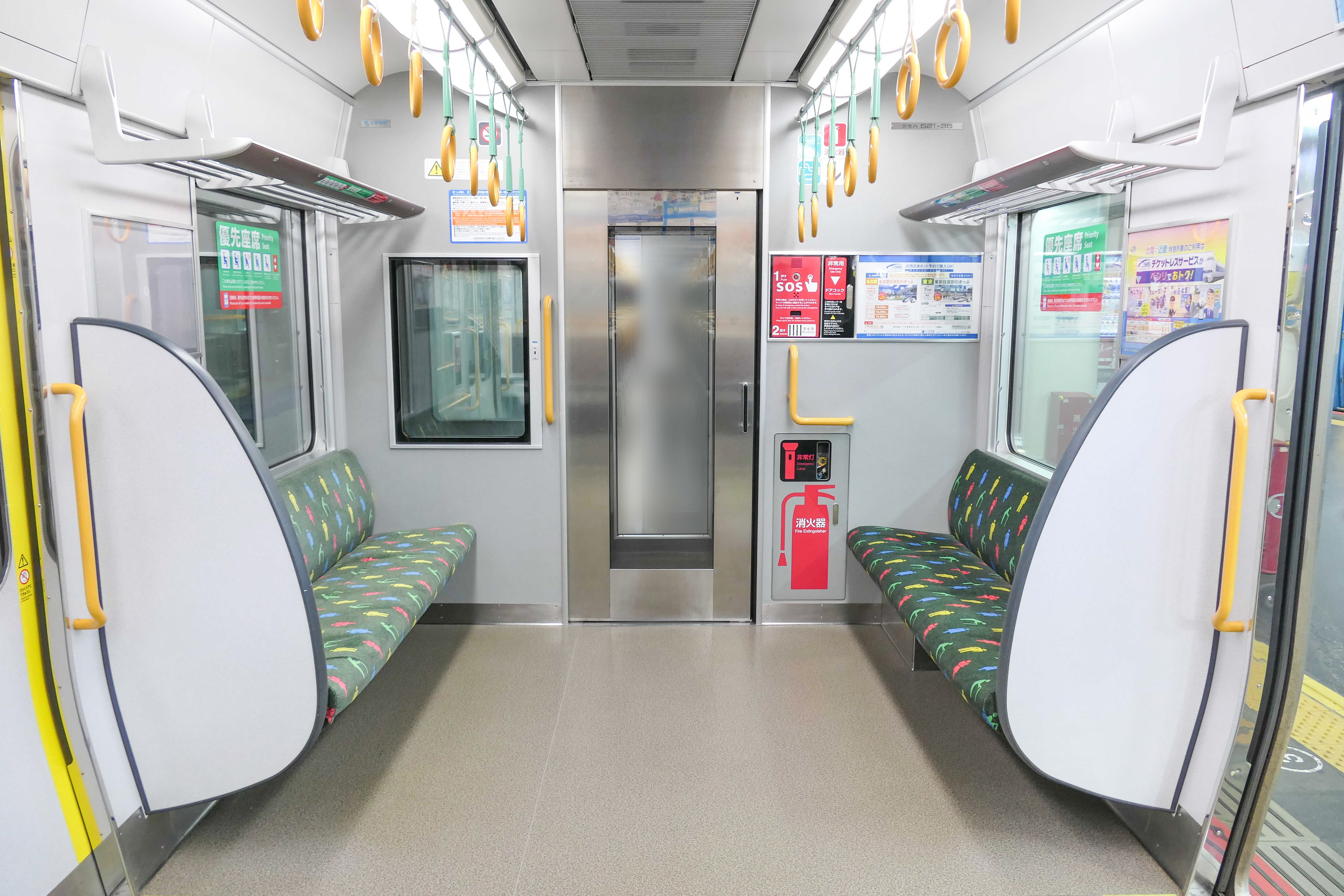
Priority seating in July 2022

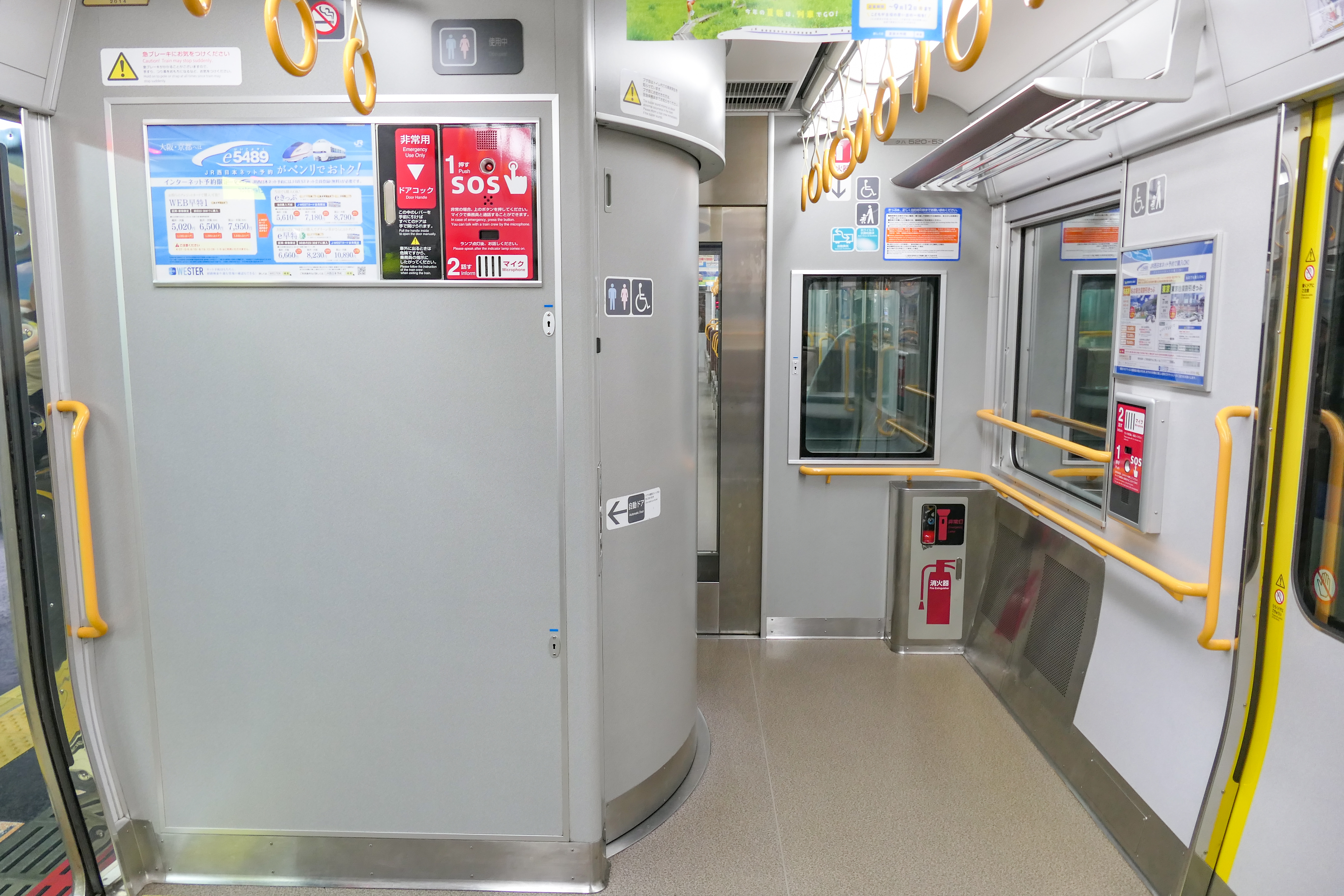
Toilet in July 2022

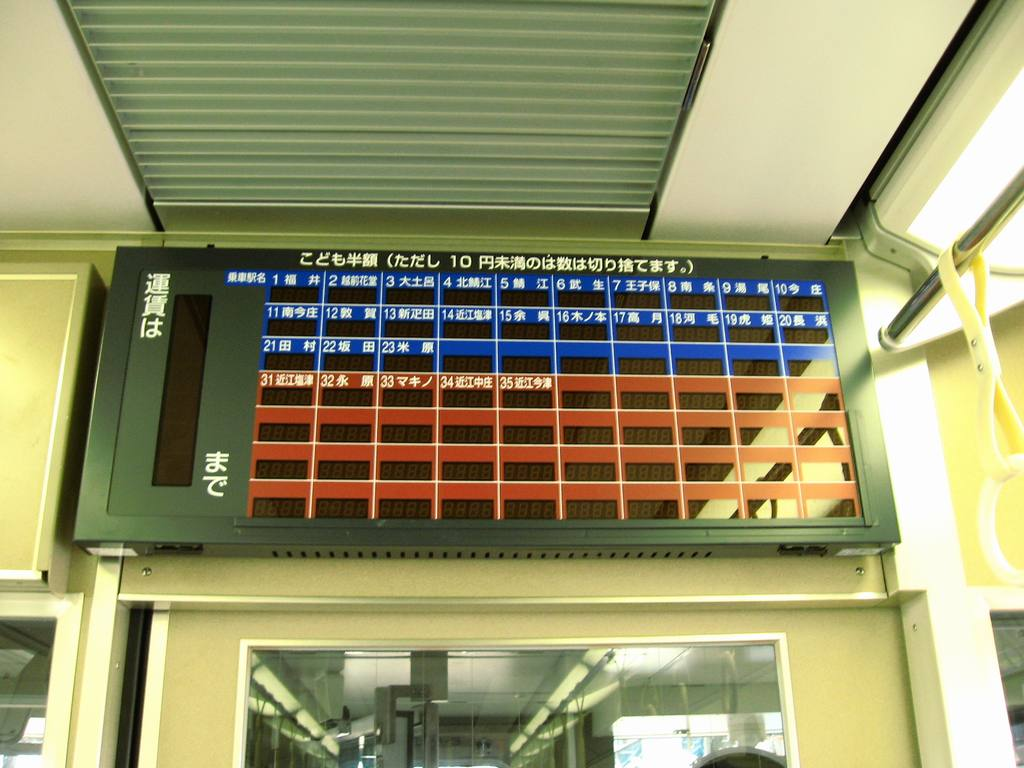
Fare indicator board for driver-only operated services

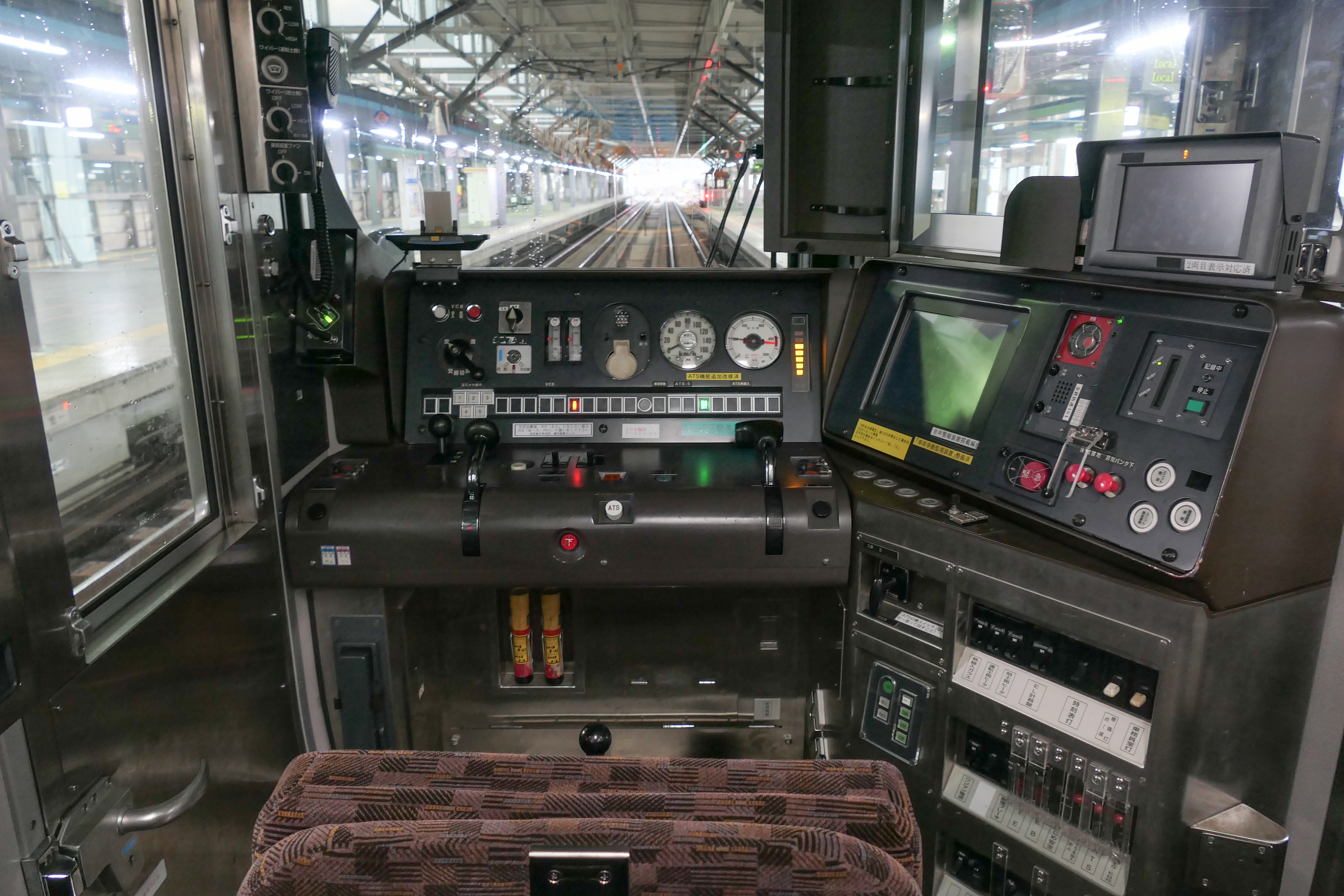
Driver's cab in April 2022

== History ==
The first five sets, E01 to E05, were built by Kawasaki Heavy Industries and Kinki Sharyo, and were delivered to Fukui depot between September and October 2006. These entered revenue service from 30 November 2006. The fleet was reallocated to Tsuruga Depot from 1 June 2010.

Ten more sets, G01 to G10, built by Kinki Sharyo, were delivered to Kanazawa depot between October 2009 and March 2010, entering revenue service from 13 March 2010. A further five sets, G11 to G15, were delivered from Kawasaki Heavy Industries in December 2010 and January 2011. 15 more sets, M01 to M15, were delivered from Kawasaki Heavy Industries to Tsuruga Depot between January and March 2011.

Nineteen third-batch two-car sets (J01 to J19) were delivered to Tsuruga Depot in fiscal 2013. The third-batch sets have cab ends based on the JR West 225 series EMUs, with improved crash resistance, and use LED lighting for interior lighting. These sets entered revenue service in spring 2014.

16 two-car 521 series sets were transferred to the third-sector railway operating company Ainokaze Toyama Railway for use from 14 March 2015 when JR West handed over ownership of the sections of the Hokuriku Main Line in Toyama Prefecture running parallel to the new Hokuriku Shinkansen. Likewise, three two-car sets were transferred to the IR Ishikawa Railway, which took over control of the section of the Hokuriku Main Line in Ishikawa Prefecture from 14 March 2015. Two more sets were newly built for the IR Ishikawa Railway.

In December 2019, the first three two-car 521-100 series sets (U01 to U03) for the Nanao Line were built by Kinki Sharyo. Unlike older JR West 521 series sets, the 521-100 series sets feature red waistline striping, reminiscent of the body colour used by older 413 and 415 series trains operated on the line. By October 2020, a total of fifteen two-car sets were built for JR West. Three more sets for the IR Ishikawa Railway (IR06 to IR08) were delivered on 3 December 2020. The 521-100 series fleet entered service on the Nanao Line from 3 October 2020.

Two more 521-0 series two-car sets (J22 and J23) were built by Kawasaki Heavy Industries and delivered to Kanazawa Depot in March 2021.
