= Hokuriku Main Line =

Railway line in Japan

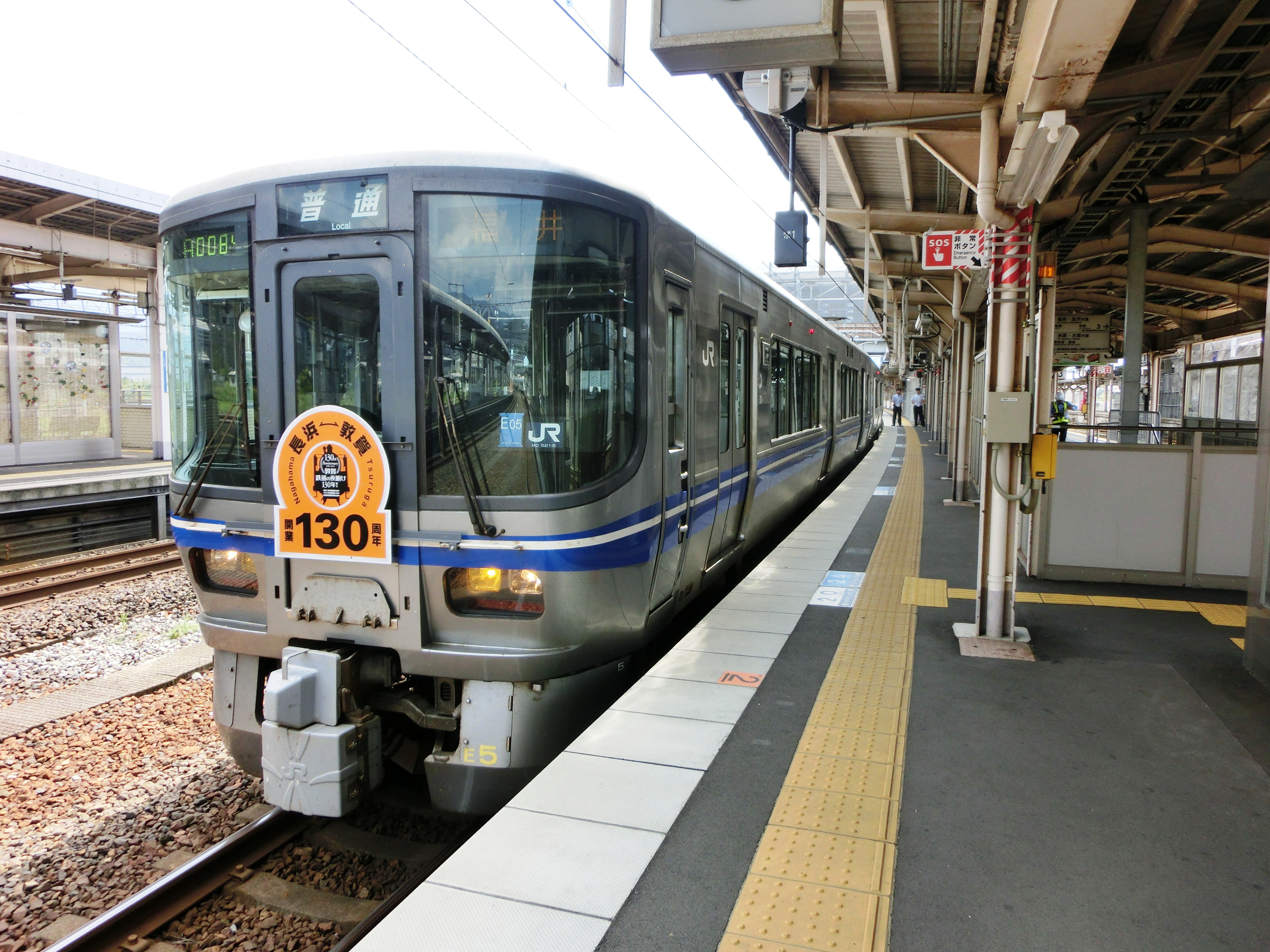
- A 521 series at Tsuruga Station

Overview
- Other name: Biwako Line (Maibara - Nagahama)
- Native name: 北陸本線
- Status: Operational
- Owner: JR West
- Locale: Shiga Prefecture; Fukui Prefecture
- Termini: Maibara; Tsuruga
- Stations: 12

Service
- Type: Heavy rail, Passenger/freight rail Regional rail, Intercity rail
- System: West Japan Railway Company (JR West) (Maibara to Tsuruga); Hapi-Line Fukui Line (Tsuruga to Daishoji; IR Ishikawa Railway (Daishoji to Kurikara); Ainokaze Toyama Railway (Kurikara to Ichiburi); Echigo Tokimeki Railway (Ichiburi to Naoetsu)
- Operator(s): JR West, JR Freight

History
- Opened: 1882; 144 years ago
- Closed: March 14, 2015: Kanazawa - Naoetsu (Converted to a third sector railway); March 16, 2024: Tsuruga - Kanazawa (Converted to a third sector railway)

Technical
- Line length: 45.9 km (28.5 mi)
- Track gauge: 1,067 mm (3 ft 6 in)
- Electrification: 1,500 V DC, 20 kV/60 Hz AC overhead line
- Operating speed: 130 km/h (81 mph)
Route map
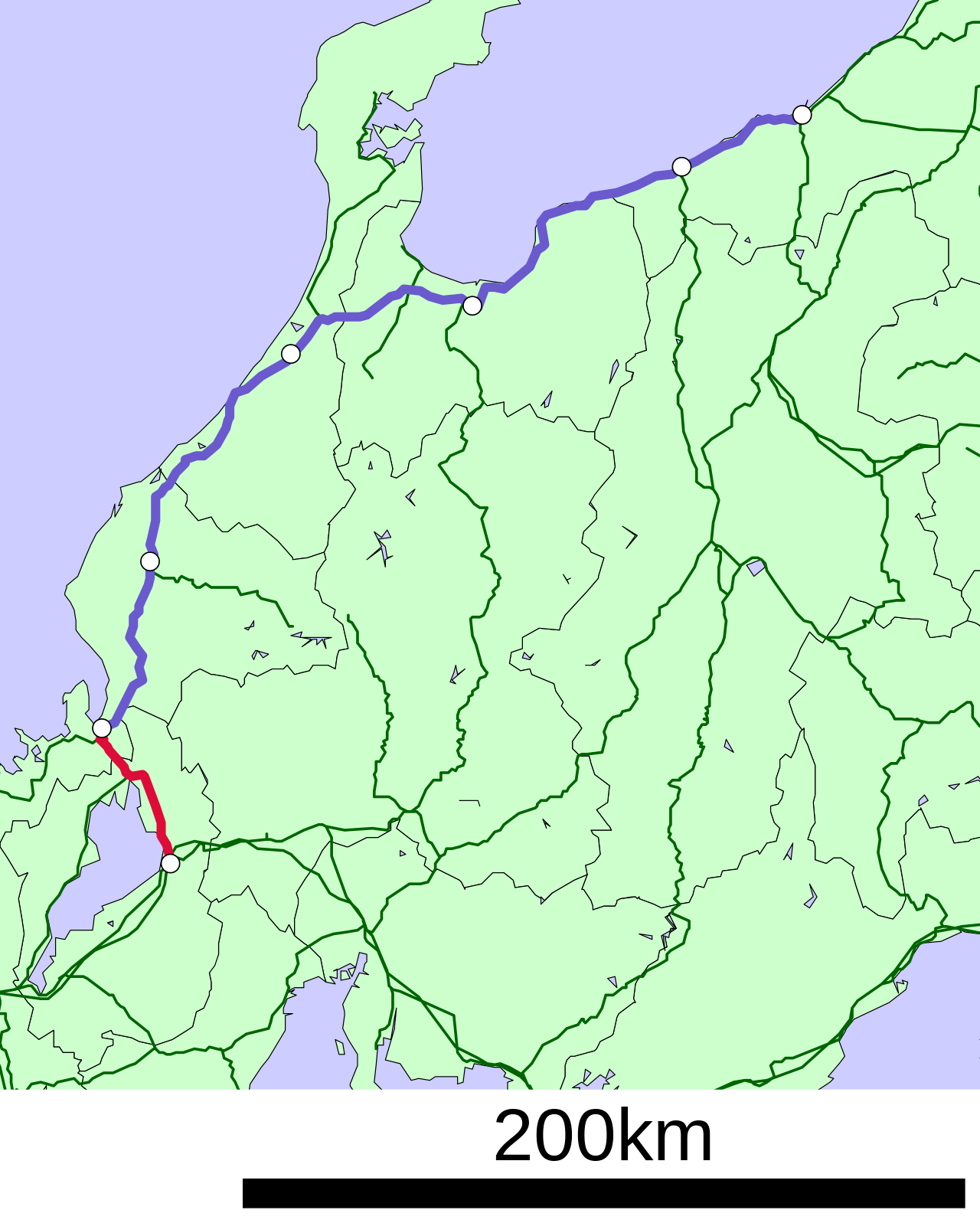
The blue line is the section that has been transferred to Hapi-Line Fukui, IR Ishikawa Railway, Ainokaze Toyama Railway, and Echigo Tokimeki Railway.

The Hokuriku Main Line (Japanese: 北陸本線, romanized: Hokuriku-honsen) is a 45.9-kilometer (28.5 mi) railway line owned by the West Japan Railway Company (JR West) connecting Maibara Station in Maibara, Shiga, with Tsuruga Station in Tsuruga, Fukui. The line formerly extended as far as Naoetsu Station in Joetsu, Niigata; however, the section between Tsuruga Station and Naoetsu Station is now operated by several third-sector railway companies. The line links the Hokuriku region on the northern central coast of Honshu, the largest island of Japan, to the regions of Kansai, Tōkai, Kantō, and Tōhoku.

The Hokuriku Shinkansen was opened on 14 March 2015 between Nagano and Kanazawa, resulting in the section between Kanazawa Station and Naoetsu Station being transferred to a third-sector railway company. Narrow-gauge limited expresses such as the Thunderbird and Shirasagi are common sights along the line. A further extension of the Hokuriku Shinkansen from Kanazawa to Tsuruga opened on 16 March 2024, resulting in this section of the Hokuriku Main Line being transferred from JR West to the third-sector companies Hapi-Line Fukui and the IR Ishikawa Railway. Of the line's original 354 km (220 mi) between Naoetsu and Maibara, just 45.9 km (28.5 mi) remains under the aegis of JR West.

The Hokuriku Main Line is double tracked and completely electrified: the section from Maibara to Tsuruga use 1,500 V DC power, while the section from Tsuruga to Kanazawa uses 20 kV AC, 60 Hz power.

JR Freight operated a small branch line for freight from Tsuruga Station to a container facility at the port of Tsuruga, but the services ceased in 2009.

== Basic data ==
- Operators, distances
  - West Japan Railway Company (Services and tracks)
  - Japan Freight Railway Company (Services)
    - From Maibara to Kanazawa: 176.6 km (109.7 mi)
- Stations:
  - Passenger stations: 12
- Double-track line: From Maibara to Tsuruga
- Electrification: From Maibara to Tsuruga
  - From Maibara to Tsuruga: 1,500 V DC
- Railway signalling:
  - From Maibara to Tsuruga: Automatic train control
- Maximum line speed: 130 km/h
- CTC center:
  - From Maibara to Ōmi-Shiotsu: Shin-Ōsaka Operation Control Center
  - From Ōmi-Shiotsu to Tsuruga: Kanazawa Operation Control Center
- CTC system:
  - From Maibara to Ōmi-Shiotsu: Safety Urban Network Traffic System (SUNTRAS)

== Stations ==
=== Maibara–Tsuruga ===
Train passing through fields near Tsuruga Station

- This entire section is electrified with direct current.

No.	Station	Japanese name	Distance (km)	Transfers	Location	
Through service to/from Tōkaidō Main Line, further to/from San'yō Main Line and Ako Line (Shirasagi operates to Nagoya Station via the Tōkaidō Main Line)
Hokuriku Line (Biwako Line)
JR-A12	Maibara	米原	0.0	JR Central: Tōkaidō Shinkansen; Tōkaidō Main Line; JR West: ( Biwako Line) ■ Ohmi Railway Main Line	Maibara	Shiga
JR-A11	Sakata	坂田	2.4		Maibara	Shiga
JR-A10	Tamura	田村	4.7		Nagahama	Shiga
JR-A09	Nagahama	長浜	7.7		Nagahama	Shiga
Hokuriku Line
JR-A08	Torahime	虎姫	12.8		Nagahama	Shiga
JR-A07	Kawake	河毛	15.6		Nagahama	Shiga
JR-A06	Takatsuki	高月	18.2		Nagahama	Shiga
JR-A05	Kinomoto	木ノ本	22.4		Nagahama	Shiga
JR-A04	Yogo	余呉	26.5		Nagahama	Shiga
JR-A03	Ōmi-Shiotsu	近江塩津	31.4	Kosei Line (JR-B10)	Nagahama	Shiga
JR-A02	Shin-Hikida	新疋田	39.2		Tsuruga	Fukui
JR-A01	Tsuruga	敦賀	45.9	Hokuriku Shinkansen ■ Obama Line; Hapi-Line Fukui Line	Tsuruga	Fukui

=== Tsuruga–Kanazawa ===
Effective the 16 March 2024 timetable revision, the section between Kanazawa and Daishoji was transferred to the IR Ishikawa Railway, while the section between Tsuruga and Daishoji was spun off to a new company, Hapi-Line Fukui, on the same day.

=== Kanazawa–Naoetsu ===
Now a third-sector railway, the section from Kanazawa to Kurikara is operated by the IR Ishikawa Railway, Kurikara to Ichiburi is owned by the Ainokaze Toyama Railway, and the section from to Naoetsu is the Echigo Tokimeki Railway Nihonkai Hisui Line.

== Rolling stock ==
=== Electric ===
- 125 series (DC)
- 223-1000/2000 series (DC)
- 225-0/100 series (DC)
- 521-0 series (AC/DC)
- 681 series (Thunderbird, Noto Kagaribi, Shirasagi limited express)
- 683 series (Thunderbird, Noto Kagaribi, Shirasagi limited express)
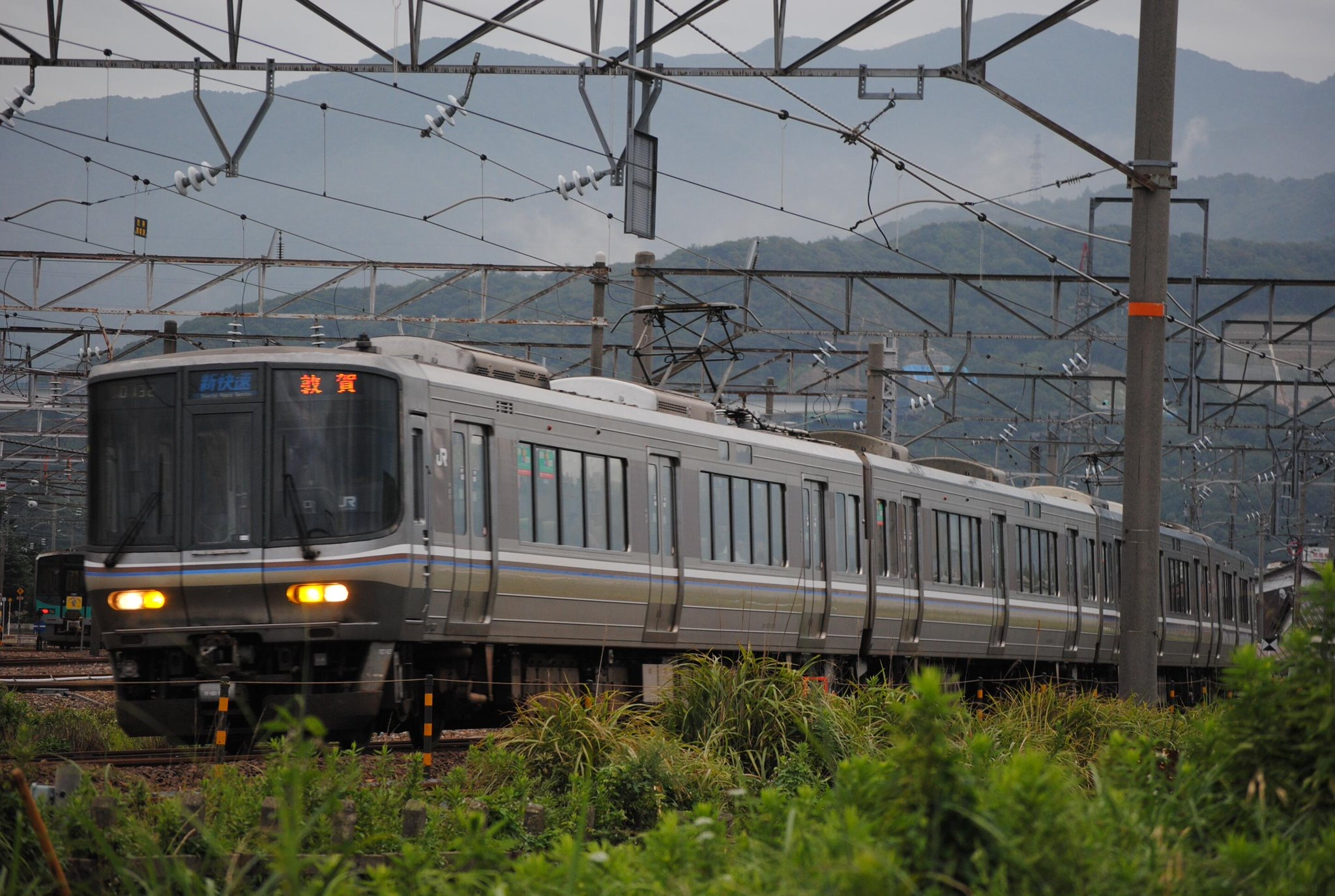
223 Series

=== Diesel ===
- KiHa 40/47
- KiHa 120

=== Former rolling stock ===
- 221 series (DC)(until March 2024)
- 413 series EMU (until March 2021)
- 415-800 series EMU (until March 2011)
- 419 series EMU (until March 2011)
- 457 series EMU (until March 2015)
- 471 series EMU (until March 2015)
- 475 series EMU (until March 2015)
- 485 series EMU (until March 2015)
- 583 series EMU (Express Kitaguni until January 2013)
- 791 series (Non-passenger train until May 1980)

== History ==
The entire line was built by the Japanese Government Railway, with the first section opened being from Nagahama, on the shore of Lake Biwa to Tsuruga in 1882. The Maibara to Nagahama section opened in 1889, and the line was then opened progressively to Fukui (in 1896), Kanazawa (in 1898), and Toyama (in 1899). The next extension opened to Uozu in 1908, and to Tomari in 1910. At the northeastern end, the Naoetsu to Nadachi section opened in 1911, and was extended to Itoigawa the following year. The final section opened in 1913, completing the line.

On 14 March 2015 the name of Terai Station was changed to Nomi-Neagari Station.

=== Double-tracking and realignments ===
The initial section double-tracked was between Kanazawa and Tsubata in 1938, with the Maibara to Tsuruga section duplicated between 1957 and 1958. The rest of the line was double-tracked in stages between 1960 and 1969.

There have been three major line deviations. The first between Kinomoto and Tsuruga involving the 5,170 m (16,960 ft) Fukasaka tunnel opened in 1957 as a new line, with the original line remaining in service until the second new line opened in 1965, including the Shin-fukasaka tunnel at 5,173 m and a spiral section partially in tunnels to ease the ruling grade on the climb from Tsuruga to Biwako.

The second major deviation, between Tsuruga and Imajo opened in 1962 as a dual track line including the 13,870 m (45,510 ft) Hokuriku Tunnel, providing a significantly straighter and faster line as well as avoiding numerous coastal sections vulnerable to disruption during severe weather events.

The third major deviation, the 21 km (13 mi) section between Uramoto and Arimagawa stations, was completed in 1969 as a dual track line, including the 11,353 m (37,247 ft) Kubiki tunnel, being the final section to be duplicated.

=== Electrification ===
The Tsuruga to Tamura section was electrified in 1957 at 20 kV AC. As Maibara was electrified at 1,500 V DC, steam locomotives hauled trains over the 5 km (3.1 mi) non-electrified section until it was electrified (at 1,500 V DC, with dual-voltage EMUs being used) in 1962, the year the 20 kV AC electrification was extended to Fukui, extending progressively to Kanazawa (in 1963), Toyama (in 1964), and Itoigawa (in 1965).

The Itoigawa to Naoetsu section was electrified at 1,500 V DC in 1969. DC was used in order to match the already-electrified Shin'etsu Main Line, which the Hokuriku Main Line joined at Naoetsu.

In 1991, in order to allow through-running with DC trains from the Tōkaidō Main Line at Maibara, the Tamura to Nagahama section was converted to 1,500 V DC, and the conversion was extended to Tsuruga in 2006.

=== Former connecting lines ===
- Tsuruga Station: The 2.7 km (1.7 mi) freight-only line to Tsuruga-minato Port was taken out of service in 2009. The ~300m section of track from the former junction to the Maizakicho level crossing has since been removed to facilitate construction of the Hokuriku Shinkansen extension from Kanazawa to Tsuruga. This line utilised a Token system for safeworking.
- Takefu Station: The Takeoka Light Railway opened a 7 km 762 mm (2 ft 6 in) gauge line to Gobuichi in 1914, converting the line to 1,067 mm (3 ft 6 in) gauge in 1924, and extending it 7 km to Tono-guchi. In 1941, the company merged with the Fukui Railway, which electrified the line at 600 V DC in 1948. The last 5 km closed in 1971, and the rest of the line closed in 1981.
- Sabae Station: The Ura Electric Railway opened a 20 km line, electrified at 600 V DC, to Oda between 1926 and 1929. The line also connected to the Fukubu Line at Mizuochi. The company merged with the Fukui Railway in 1945. As a result of double-tracking work on the Hokuriku Line at Sabae, the section to Mizuochi closed in 1962, with the rest of the line closing in 1973.
- Maruoka Station: The Maruoka Railway opened a 4 km 762 mm gauge line to Shin-Maruoka in 1915. In 1930, it was regauged to 1,067 mm and electrified at 600 V DC in conjunction with the opening of the Eiheiji Line to Shin-Maruoka from Arawa Onsen. The following year, a 3 km electrified line was opened from Maruoka to Nishi Nagata on the Mikuni Awara Line. The company merged with the Keifuku Railway in 1944, and the entire 7 km line closed in 1968.
- Awara Onsen Station:

An 8 km line to Mikuni on the Mikuni Awara Line operated between 1911 and 1972.

The Eiheiji Railway Co. opened a 25 km line to its namesake town in 1929, connecting with the Katsuyama Eiheiji Line at Higashi-Furuichi. The company merged with the Keifuku Electric Railway Co. in 1944. The Arawa Onsen - Higashi-Furuichi section closed in 1969, and the section to Eijeihi closed in 2002 after a fatal head-on collision resulted in services being suspended and subsequently never resumed.

- Daishoji Station: A 9 km 915 mm (3 ft) gauge horse-drawn tramway opened to Yamanaka between 1898 and 1900. In 1913, the line was converted to 1,067 mm gauge and electrified. The line closed in 1971. The Hokuriku Railway Co. operated an 11 km line (known as the Contact Line) from Awazu Onsen (see Awazu station below) connected to the Uwano Line and this line between 1911 and 1963.
- Iburihashi Station: The Hokuriku Railway had two separate lines connecting here:

On the western side of the line, the 3 km line to Katayamazu opened in 1914 as a 915 mm gauge horse-drawn tramway. It was converted to 1,067 mm gauge and electrified in 1922, and closed in 1965.

On the eastern side, the 3 km electrified line to Uwano operated between 1911 and 1971.

- Awazu Station: The Awazu Onsen Railway opened a 4 km 762 mm gauge line to Awazu Onsen in 1911, converting the line to 1,067 mm gauge and electrifying it in 1916. The line closed in 1962.
- Komatsu Station:

A 17 km 762 mm gauge line opened to the Ogoya copper mine between 1919 and 1920. The Meitetsu Railway took over management of the line in 1962, renaming the terminus Ogoya Onsen. The copper mine closed in 1971, and the line closed in 1977.

A 6 km horse-drawn tramway opened in 1906 to serve the Yusenji copper mine. Steam locomotion was introduced the following year, and the mine and line closed in 1918. In 1929, the line was regauged to 1,067 mm, electrified and reopened by the Hakusen Electric Railway, but it was declared bankrupt the following year. The Komatsu Electric Railway purchased the line at the receiver's auction in 1935, and merged with the Hokuriku Railway in 1945. Patronage declined from 2,126,000 in 1967 to 623,000 in 1983, and as a result the line closed in 1986.

- Terai Station (present-day Nomi-Neagari Station): The Nomi Electric Railway opened a 17 km line, electrified at 600 V DC to Tsurugi on the Hokuriku Railroad Ishikawa Line in 1927. Flooding destroyed the Tedorigawa bridge in 1934, which was replaced nine months later. The company merged with the Hokuriku Railway in 1942. Freight services ceased in 1968, and the line closed in 1980.
- Matto station: In 1904, the 8 km, 915 mm gauge Matsukane horse-drawn tramway opened to Nomachi on the Hokuriku Railroad Ishikawa Line, and also connected with Nonoichi station on the same line (not the current JR West station of the same name, which opened in 1968), 3 km before the terminus. In 1916, the line was converted to 1,067 mm gauge and electrified at 600 V DC. The line was acquired by the Kanazawa Electric Railway in 1920, which merged with the Hokuriku Railway in 1942. The 3 km Nonoichi to Nomachi section closed in 1944, and the remaining 5 km line closed in 1955.
- Kanazawa Station: The 5 km 762 mm gauge Jinshi horse-drawn tramway opened in 1898, being converted to 1,067 mm gauge and electrified at 600 V DC in 1914. In 1920, the line was extended to Ono Port, and a further 2 km to Ono Minato in 1923. A 400m branch to Ryokuchi Park opened in 1930, passenger services on the branch ceasing in 1945 though the line remained to service a paper mill. The entire system closed in 1970.
- Isurugi Station: The Tonami Railway opened a 7 km line to Tsuzawa in 1915, and merged with the Kaetsu Railway in 1919, which extended the line 13 km to Shogawa-Cho in 1922, including a connection to the Johana Line at Fukuno. The line closed in 1972.
- Kurobe Station: The Toyo Aluminium Company planned to build Japan's first aluminium refinery near Kurobe, and in 1922 opened a line electrified at 600 V DC to the proposed refinery site. The refinery did not proceed, so the company extended the line to Ishida Minato to serve an Onsen. The line closed in 1940.

== Hokuriku Shinkansen ==
The Hokuriku Shinkansen extension, from Nagano to Kanazawa, approximately parallels the route of the Hokuriku Main Line. With the opening of the Hokuriku Shinkansen, control of local passenger services on the sections of the Hokuriku Main Line running through Ishikawa, Toyama, and Niigata prefectures was transferred to the following four third-sector operating companies owned by the respective prefectures. An additional extension running between Kanazawa and Tsuruga opened on 16 March 2024.

- Hapi-Line Fukui (84.3 km (52.4 mi), Tsuruga - Daishoji)
- IR Ishikawa Railway (64.2 km (39.9 mi), Daishoji - Kurikara)
  - IR Ishikawa Railway overtook an additional 46.4 km (28.8 mi) section of the Hokuriku Main Line between Kanazawa and Daishoji on 16 March 2024.
- Ainokaze Toyama Railway (100.1 km (62.2 mi), Kurikara - Ichiburi)
- Echigo Tokimeki Railway Company Nihonkai Hisui Line (59.3 km (36.8 mi), Ichiburi - Naoetsu)
