= Nishi-Tsuruga Station =

Railway station in Tsuruga, Fukui Prefecture, Japan

Nishi-Tsuruga Station 西敦賀駅
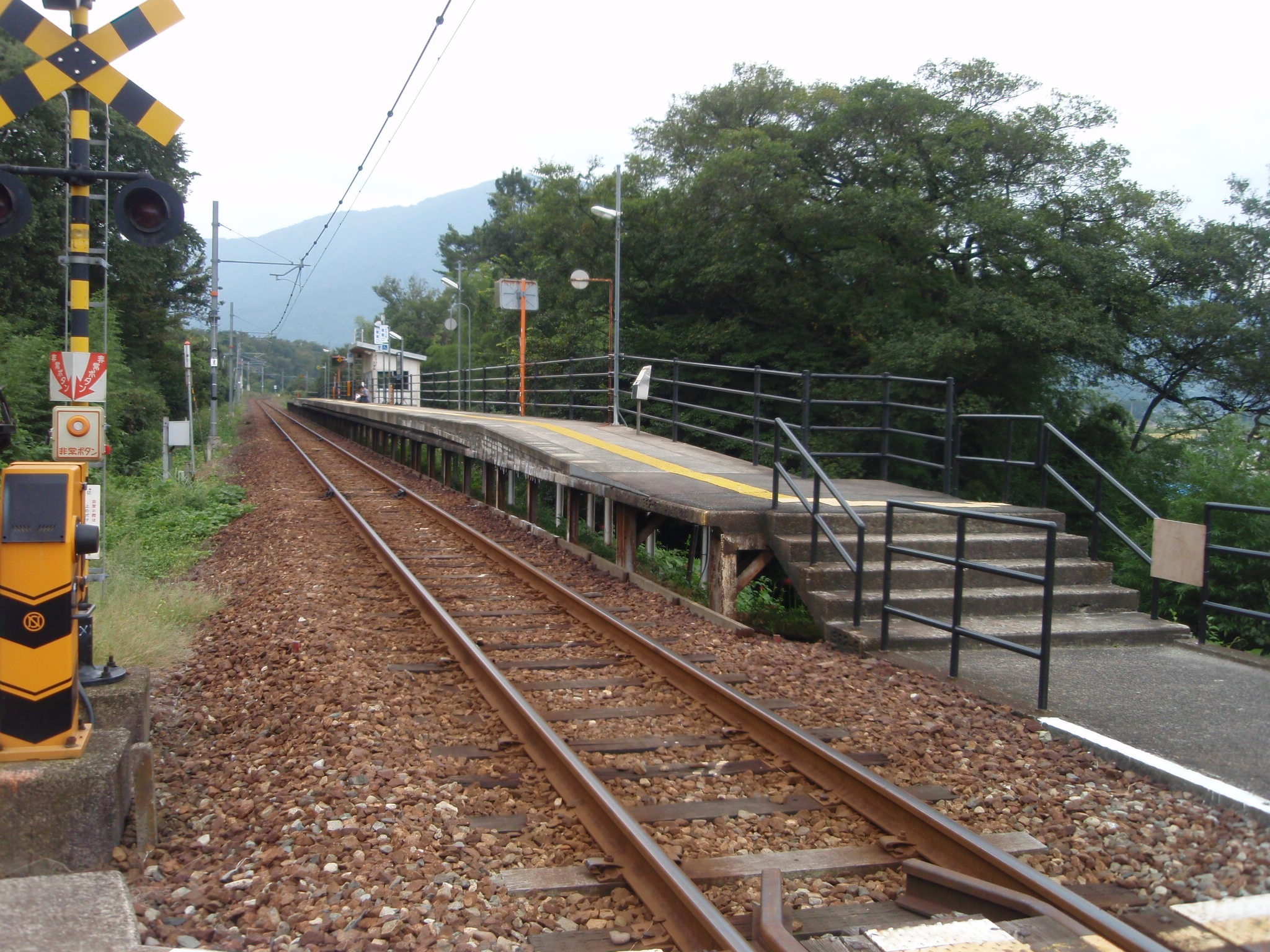
- Nishi-Tsuruga Station

General information
- Location: Yamashimizu, Tsuruga City, Fukui Prefecture 914-0035; Japan
- Coordinates: 35.6181°N 136.0679°E
- Operator: JR West
- Line: Obama Line
- Distance: 3.3 km (2.1 mi) from Tsuruga
- Platforms: 1 side platform
- Tracks: 1

Construction
- Structure type: At grade

Other information
- Status: Unstaffed
- Website: Official website

History
- Opened: 1 September 1962; 64 years ago

Passengers
- FY 2023: 224 daily

Services
Preceding station	JR West	Following station
Awano towards Higashi-Maizuru	Obama Line Local	Tsuruga Terminus
Location
- Location within Fukui Prefecture Location within Kansai region Location within Japan

Nishi-Tsuruga Station (西敦賀駅, Nishi-Tsuruga-eki) is a railway station in the city of Tsuruga, Fukui Prefecture, Japan, operated by West Japan Railway Company (JR West).

== Lines ==
Nishi-Tsuruga Station is served by the Obama Line, and is located 3.3 kilometers from the terminus of the line at Tsuruga.

== Station layout ==
The station consists of one side platform serving a single bi-directional track. There is no station building. The station is unattended.

== History ==
Nishi-Tsuruga Station opened on 1 September 1962. With the privatization of Japanese National Railways (JNR) on 1 April 1987, the station came under the control of JR West.

== Passenger statistics ==
In fiscal 2016, the station was used by an average of 140 passengers daily (boarding passengers only).

== Surrounding area ==
The station is located at the edge of a residential area

- Fukui Prefecture Tsuruga Industrial High School

== See also ==
- List of railway stations in Japan
