= Shin-Hikida Station =

Railway station in Tsuruga, Fukui Prefecture, Japan

Shin-Hikida Station 新疋田駅
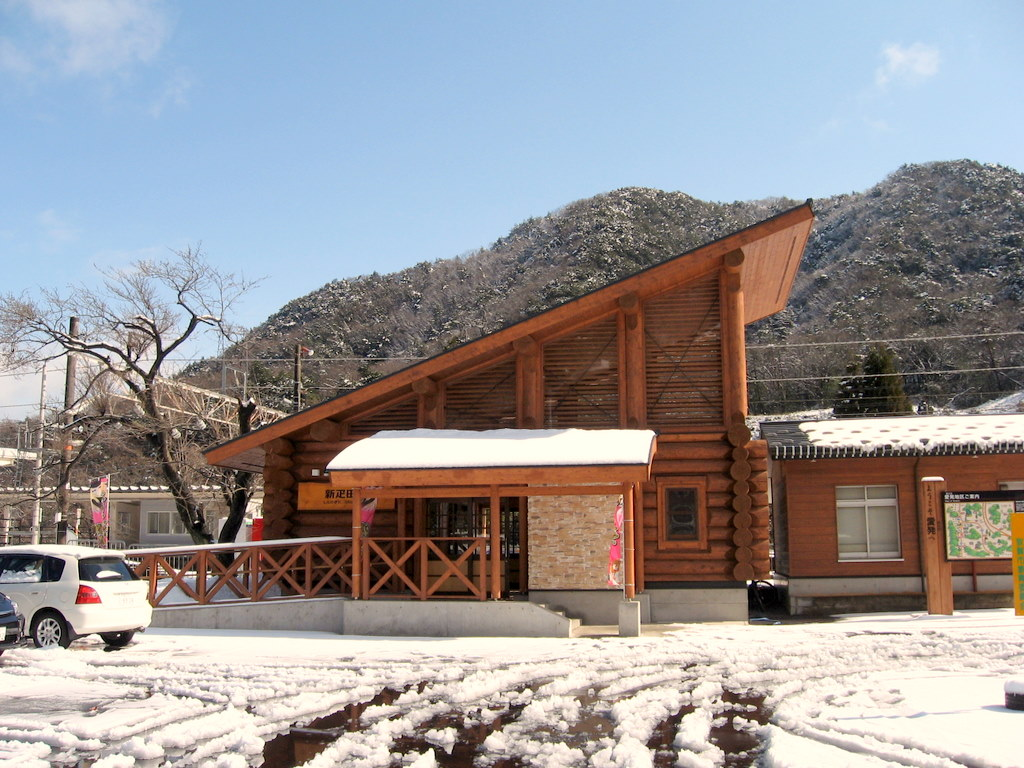
- Shin-Hikida Station in March 2007

General information
- Location: 70-8 Hikida, Tsuruga-shi, Fukui-ken 914-0302; Japan
- Coordinates: 35.5943°N 136.1006°E
- Operator: JR West
- Line: A B Hokuriku Main Line
- Distance: 39.2 km from Maibara
- Platforms: 2 side platforms
- Tracks: 2
- Connections: Bus stop

Construction
- Structure type: Ground level
- Parking: Yes
- Accessible: Yes

Other information
- Status: Unstaffed
- Station code: JR-A02 (Hokuriku Main Line); JR-B09 (Kosei Line)
- Website: Official website

History
- Opened: 1 October 1957

Passengers
- FY 2023: 48 daily

Services
Preceding station	JR West	Following station
Omi-Shiotsu towards Maibara	Hokuriku Main Line Local Rapid Special Rapid	Tsuruga Terminus
Omi-Shiotsu towards Kyoto	Kosei Line Local Rapid Special Rapid	Tsuruga Terminus
Location
- Location within Japan

Shin-Hikida Station (新疋田駅, Shinhikida-eki) is a railway station on the Hokuriku Main Line in the city of Tsuruga, Fukui Prefecture, Japan, operated by the West Japan Railway Company (JR West).

== Lines ==
Shin-Hikida Station is served by the Hokuriku Main Line and is located 39.2 kilometres (24.4 miles) from the terminus of the line at Maibara. Trains of the Kosei Line also continue past their nominal terminus at Ōmi-Shiotsu to Tsuruga and stop at this station.

== Station layout ==
JR West 683 series Thunderbird limited express passing Shin-Hikida Station, Tsuruga

The station consists of two opposed unnumbered side platforms connected by a level crossing. The station is unattended.

=== Platforms ===
Station building side	■ Hokuriku Main Line	for Tsuruga and Fukui
opposite side	■ Hokuriku Main Line	for Osaka and Maibara

== History ==
Shin-Hikida Station opened on 1 October 1957. With the privatization of Japanese National Railways (JNR) on 1 April 1987, the station came under the control of JR West. A new station building opened on 11 October 2006.

Station numbering was introduced in March 2018 with Shin-Hikida being assigned station numbers JR-A02 for the Hokuriku Main Line and JR-B09 for the Kosei Line.

== Passenger statistics ==
In fiscal 2016, the station was used by an average of 23 passengers daily (boarding passengers only).

== Surrounding area ==
- National Route 161

== See also ==
- List of railway stations in Japan
