= Ōmi-Shiotsu Station =

Railway station in Nagahama, Shiga Prefecture, Japan

Ōmi-Shiotsu Station 近江塩津駅
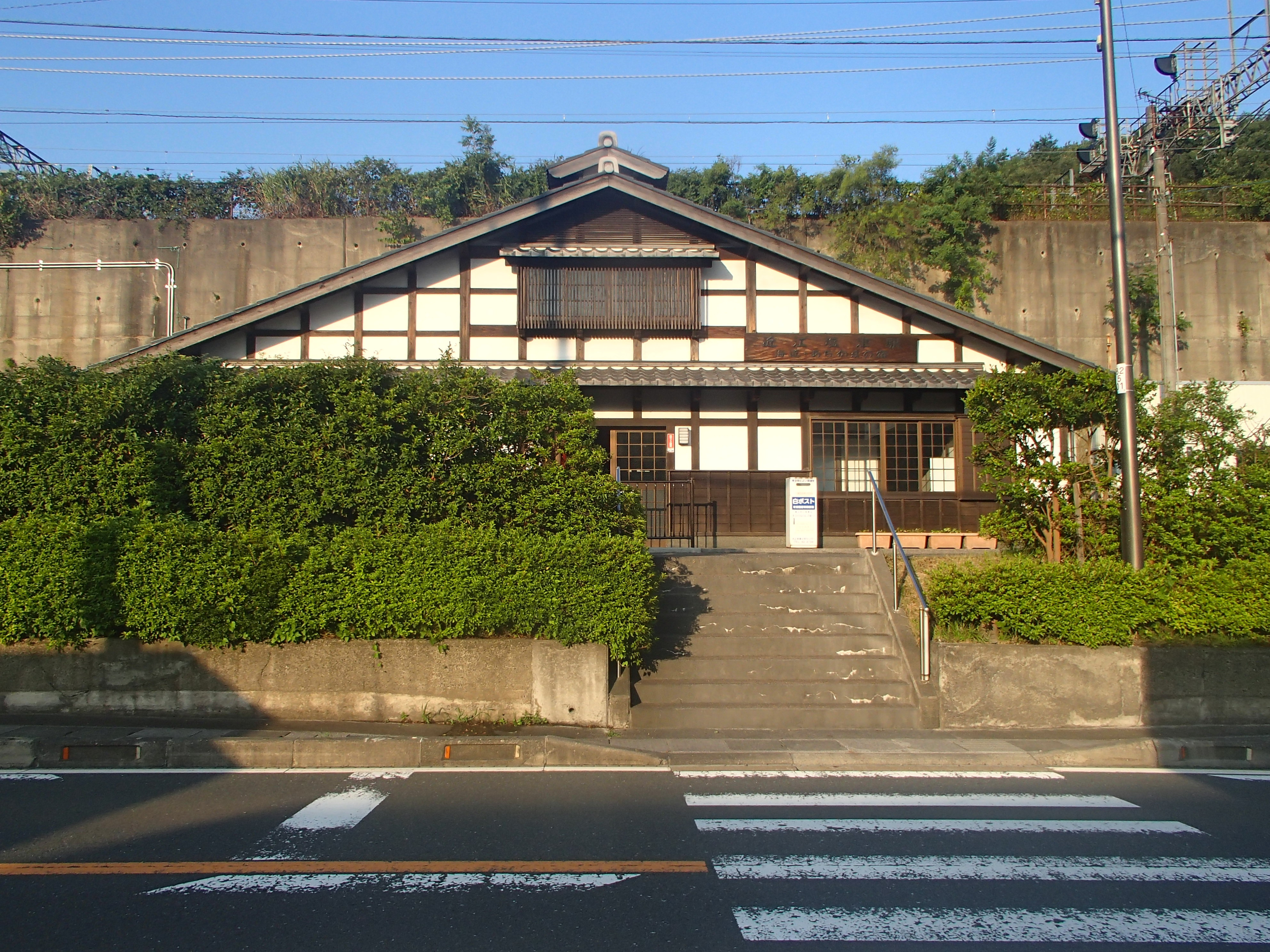
- Ōmi-Shiotsu Station, August 2019

General information
- Location: 245 Yo Nishiazai-cho, Nagahama City, Shiga Prefecture 529-0706; Japan
- Coordinates: 35°32′22.7″N 136°9′4.84″E
- Operator: JR West
- Lines: A Hokuriku Main Line; B Kosei Line
- Distance: 31.4 km (19.5 mi) from Maibara
- Platforms: 1 side + 2 island platforms
- Tracks: 5
- Connections: Bus stop

Construction
- Structure type: Elevated

Other information
- Station code: JR-A03 (Hokuriku Main Line); JR-B10 (Kosei Line)
- Website: Official website

History
- Opened: 1 October 1957; 68 years ago

Passengers
- FY 2023: 260 daily

Services
Preceding station	JR West	Following station
Yogo towards Maibara	Hokuriku Main Line Local Rapid Special Rapid	Shin-Hikida towards Tsuruga
Nagahara towards Kyoto	Kosei Line Local Rapid Special Rapid	Shin-Hikida towards Tsuruga
Location
- Location within Shiga Prefecture Location within Kansai region Location within Japan

Ōmi-Shiotsu Station (近江塩津駅, Ōmishiotsu-eki) is a junction passenger railway station located in the city of Nagahama, Shiga, Japan, operated by the West Japan Railway Company (JR West). It is the northernmost station in Shiga Prefecture

== Lines ==
Ōmi-Shiotsu Station is served by the Biwako Line portion of the Hokuriku Main Line, and is 31.4 kilometres (19.5 miles) from the terminus of the line at Maibara. It is also the nominal northern terminus of the Kosei Line, although most express trains continue on to Tsuruga in Fukui Prefecture using the tracks of the Hokuriku Main Line. The station is 74.1 kilometres (46.0 miles) from the starting point of the Kosei Line at Yamashina and 79.6 kilometres (49.5 miles) from Kyoto.

== Station layout ==
The station consists of two island platforms built on an embankment, connected to the station building by an underground passage. The station is staffed.

=== Platforms ===
0	■ Hokuriku Main Line	for Tsuruga and Fukui (not normally used)
1	■ Kosei Line	for Omi-Imazu and Kyoto
2	■ Kosei Line	for Omi-Imazu and Kyoto
2	■ Hokuriku Main Line	for Nagahama and Maibara for Tsuruga and Fukui (through from Kosei Line)
3	■ Hokuriku Main Line	for Tsuruga and Fukui
4	■ Hokuriku Main Line	for Nagahama and Maibara

== History ==
Ōmi-Shiotsu Station opened on 1 October 1957 under the Japan National Railways (JNR). The station came under the aegis of the West Japan Railway Company (JR West) on 1 April 1987 due to the privatization of JNR.

Station numbering was introduced in March 2018 with Ōmi-Shiotsu being assigned station number JR-A03 for the Hokuriku Main Line and JR-B08 for the Kosei Line.

== Passenger statistics ==
In fiscal 2019, the station was used by an average of 207 passengers daily (boarding passengers only).

== Surrounding area ==
The station is surrounded by mountains on three sides, with Japan National Route 8 passing in front of the station. Nagahama City Shiotsu Elementary School is in the vicinity.

== Gallery ==
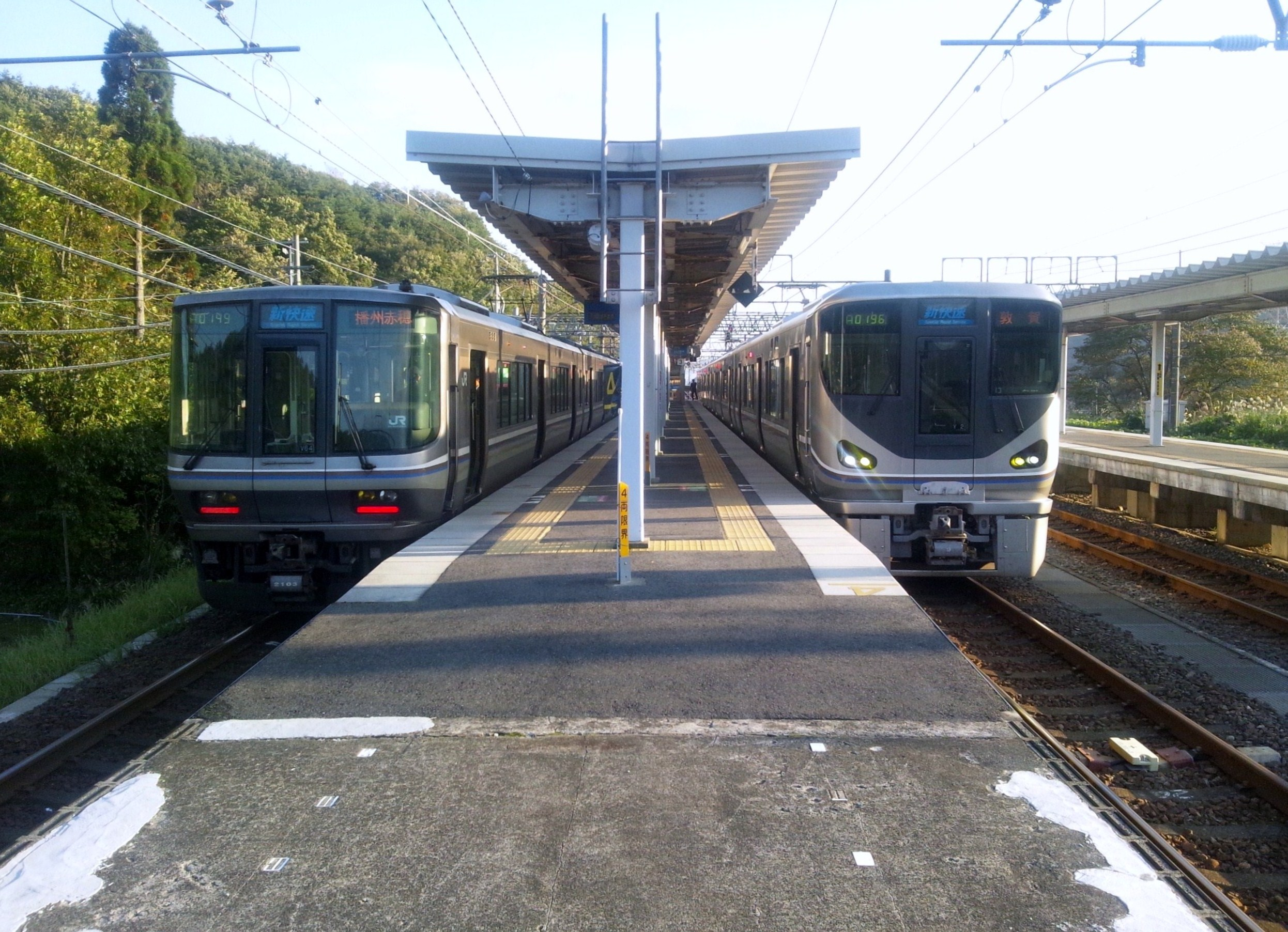
October 2011

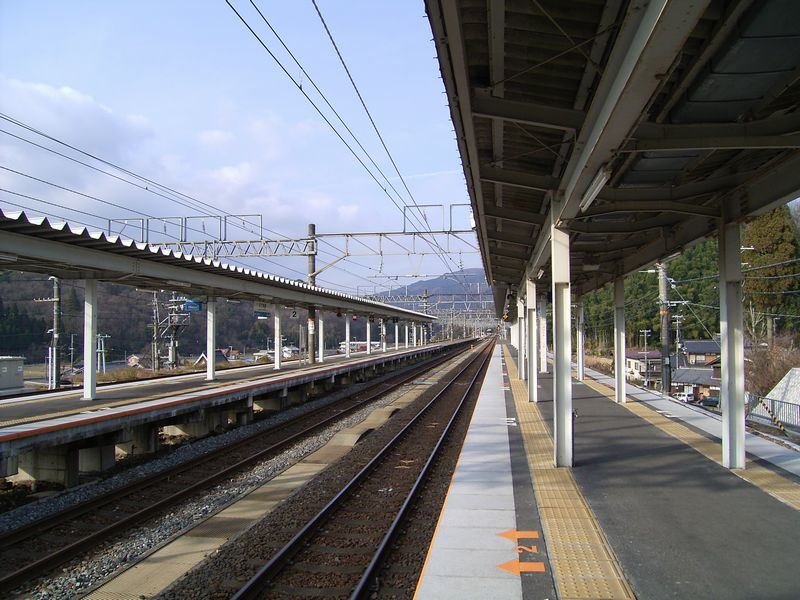
Platforms 3 and 4, January 2007

== See also ==
- List of railway stations in Japan
