= Tsuruga Station =

Railway station in Tsuruga, Fukui Prefecture, Japan

A 01 B 08 Tsuruga Station 敦賀駅
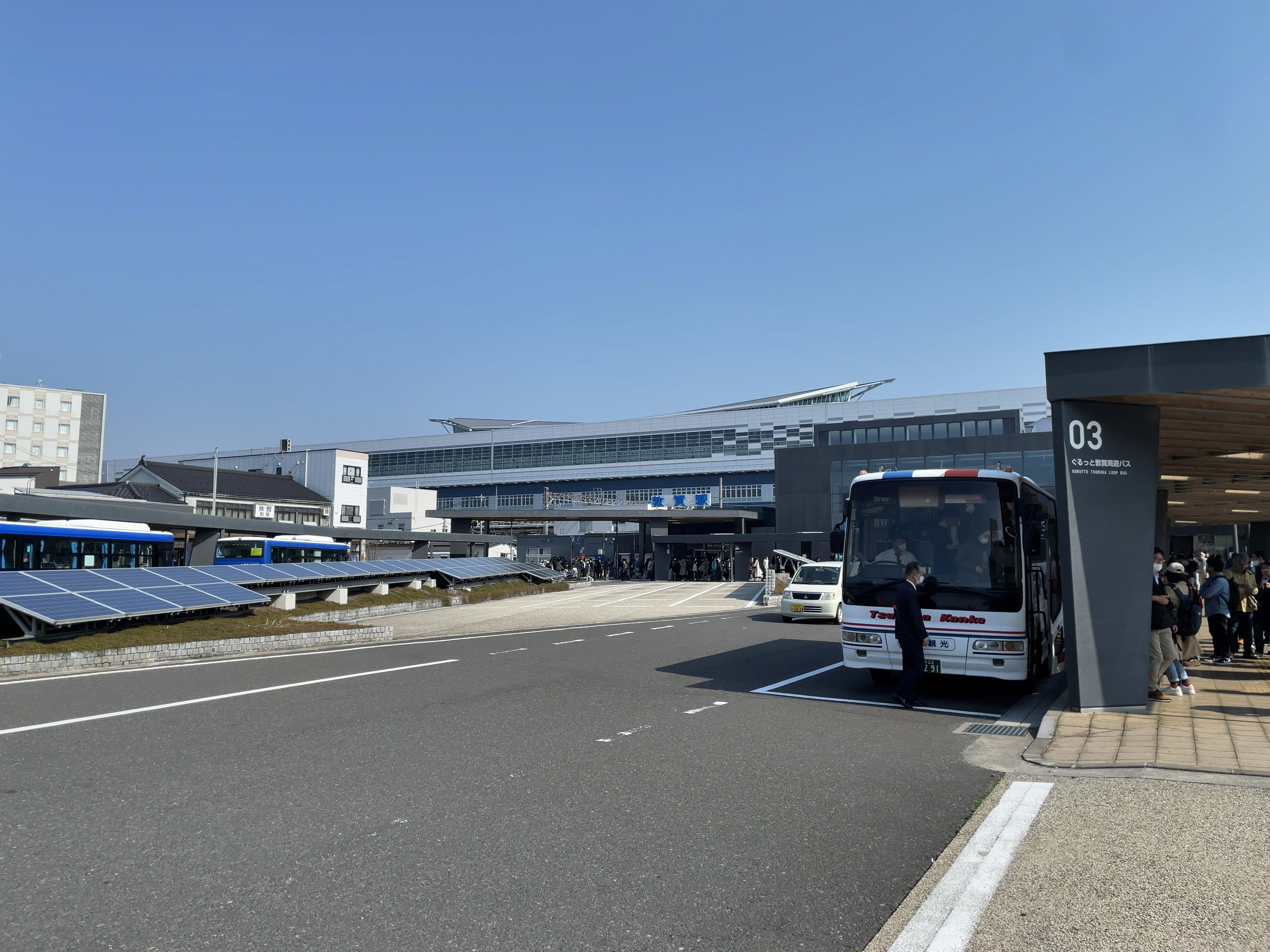
- West side in March 2024

General information
- Location: 1-1-24 Kanawa-cho, Tsuruga City, Fukui Prefecture 914-0026; Japan
- Coordinates: 35°38′41″N 136°4′36″E
- Operator: JR West; JR Freight; Hapi-Line Fukui
- Lines: A B Hokuriku Main Line; Hokuriku Shinkansen; Obama Line; Hapi-Line Fukui Line
- Platforms: 7 island platforms
- Tracks: 15
- Connections: Bus terminal

Construction
- Structure type: Elevated (Shinkansen); At grade (conventional lines)

Other information
- Status: Staffed ("Midori no Madoguchi")
- Station code: JR-A01 (Hokuriku Main Line); JR-B08 (Kosei Line)
- Website: Official website

History
- Opened: 10 March 1882; 144 years ago

Passengers
- FY 2023: 5,978 daily

Services
Preceding station	JR West	Following station
Terminus	Hokuriku Shinkansen Kagayaki	Echizen-Takefu towards Nagano
Terminus	Hokuriku Shinkansen Hakutaka	Echizen-Takefu towards Jōetsumyōkō
Terminus	Hokuriku Shinkansen Tsurugi	Echizen-Takefu towards Toyama
Shin-Hikida towards Maibara	Hokuriku Main Line Local Rapid Special Rapid	Terminus
Shin-Hikida towards Kyoto	Kosei Line Local Rapid Special Rapid	Terminus
Nishi-Tsuruga towards Higashi-Maizuru	Obama Line Local	Terminus
Preceding station	Hapi-Line Fukui	Following station
Terminus	Hapi-Line Fukui Line Rapid	Imajō towards Fukui
Terminus	Hapi-Line Fukui Line Rapid	Nanjō towards Fukui
Terminus	Hapi-Line Fukui Line Regional Rapid	Imajō towards Fukui
Terminus	Hapi-Line Fukui Line Local	Minami-Imajō towards Daishōji
Location
- Location within Fukui Prefecture Location within Kansai region Location within Japan

Tsuruga Station (敦賀駅, Tsuruga-eki) is a joint-use railway station in the city of Tsuruga, Fukui, Japan, jointly operated by West Japan Railway Company (JR West) and Hapi-Line Fukui. The station premises are managed by JR West. It is served by the Hokuriku Shinkansen, the Hokuriku Main Line, the Obama Line and the Hapi-Line Fukui Line, all of which terminate at Tsuruga. A freight-only branch line known as the Tsuruga Port Line operated by JR Freight formerly ran from this station.

== Lines ==
Tsuruga Station is served by the Hokuriku Main Line and is located 45.9 kilometres (28.5 miles) from the other terminus of the line at Maibara. Trains of the Kosei Line also continue past their nominal terminus at Ōmi-Shiotsu to terminate at this station. As of March 2024, the Hokuriku Shinkansen now serves Tsuruga and is located 574.7 kilometres (357.1 miles) from the terminus at Tōkyō. The station is also a terminus of the 84.3-kilometre (52.4-mile) Obama Line to Higashi-Maizuru.

== Station layout ==
The station platforms can be divided into two areas: the long-existing conventional area now reserved for local trains, and the newer Shinkansen building serving long-distance trains. The main link is the pedestrian bridge that starts behind the station's entrance building at the West Exit, crosses over and serve the conventional platforms, and connects to the second-floor concourse of the Shinkansen building. The East Exit was created in tandem with the opening of the Shinkansen and is housed in that building.

The conventional area consists of three island platforms serving seven tracks. The overhead lines are powered using 1,500 V DC, although heading north on the Hapi-Line Fukui Line the electrification soon changes to 20 kV AC (60 Hz).

The Shinkansen building has two platform levels with the concourse sandwiched in between. The Shinkansen platforms, on the third floor at 21 metres above ground and consisting of two island platforms serving four tracks, is the tallest on the Shinkansen network. The height allows the tracks to continue over a nearby road viaduct. The first floor has two island platforms with four tracks for conventional limited express services from Osaka and Nagoya, that previously continued to Kanazawa via the outdoor conventional platforms but now terminate here to relay passengers to the Shinkansen.

=== Platforms ===
1-2	■ Obama Line	for Obama and Higashi-Maizuru
3	■ Hapi-Line Fukui Line	for Fukui, Kanazawa
4	■ Hokuriku Main Line	Kosei Line Special Rapid / Local services for Maibara and Osaka
5	■ Hokuriku Main Line	Kosei Line Special Rapid / Local services for Maibara and Osaka
6	■ Hokuriku Main Line	for Maibara, Osaka
7	■ Hapi-Line Fukui Line	for Fukui, Kanazawa
7	■ Hokuriku Main Line	for Maibara, Osaka
31-32	■ Arrival Only	-
33	■ Hokuriku Main Line	Limited Express Thunderbird for Kyoto, Osaka
34	■ Hokuriku Main Line	Limited Express Shirasagi for Maibara, Nagoya
11-14	■ Hokuriku Shinkansen	for Kanazawa and Tokyo

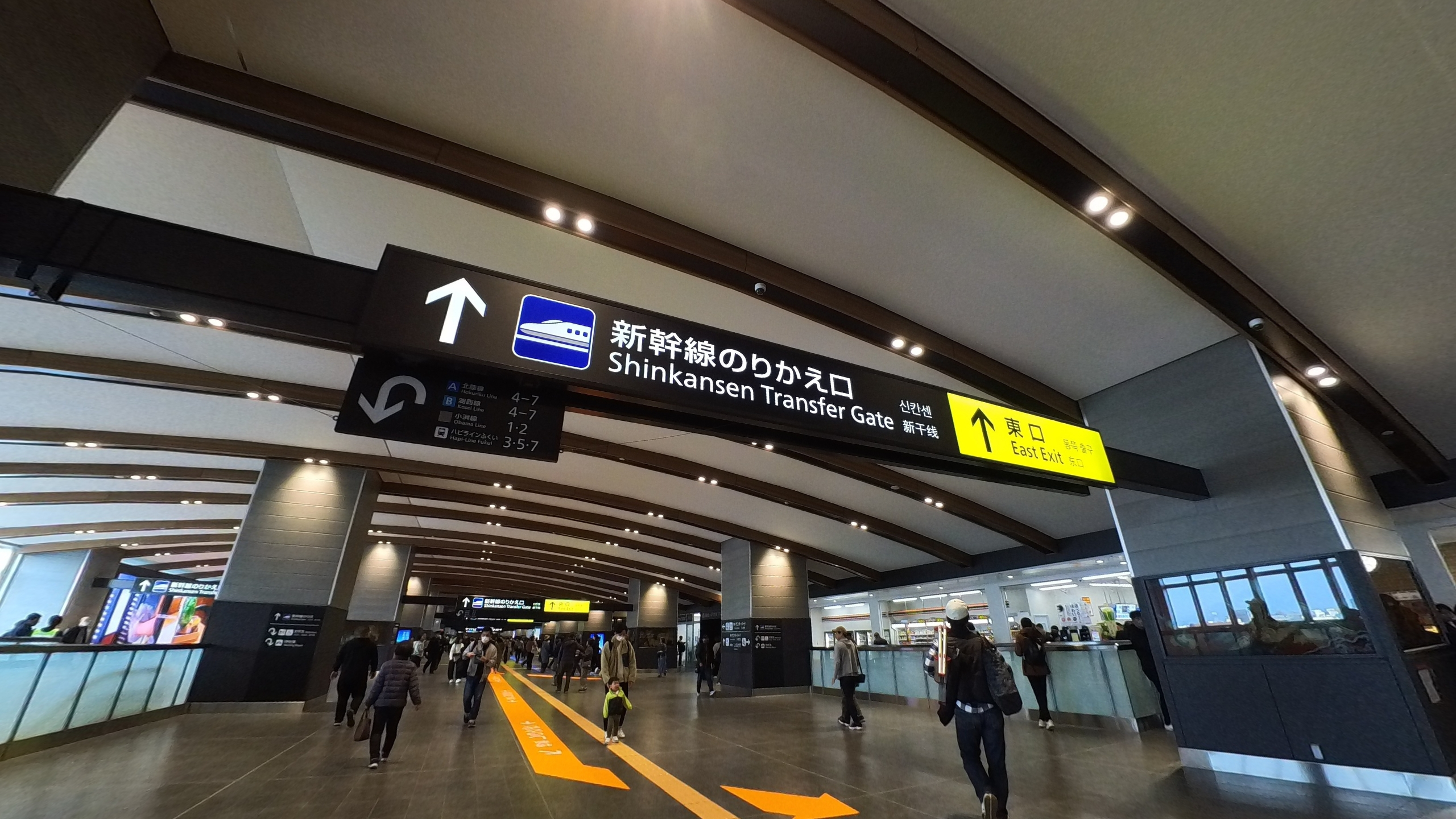
Shinkansen concourse, March 2024

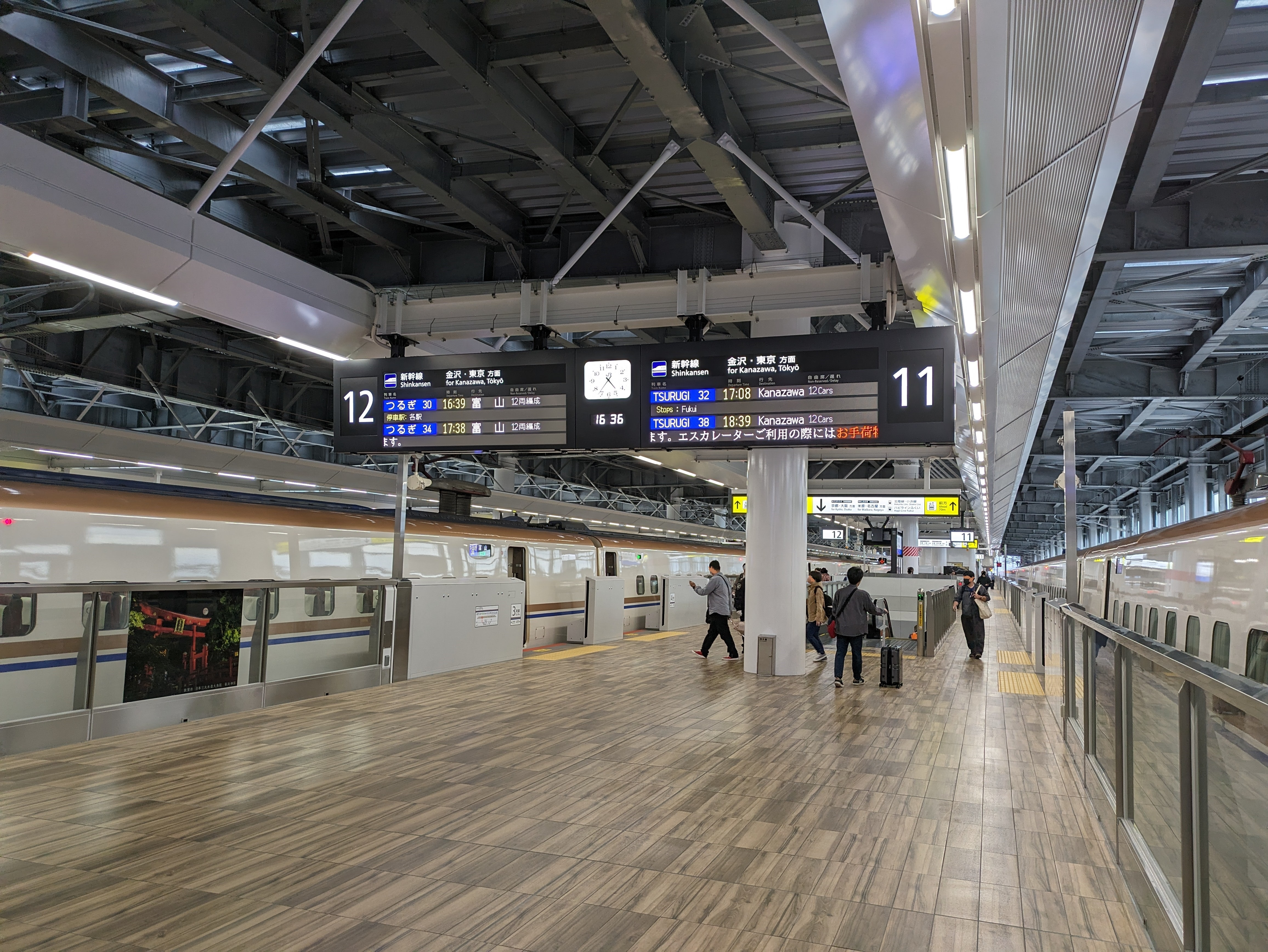
Shinkansen platforms, May 2024

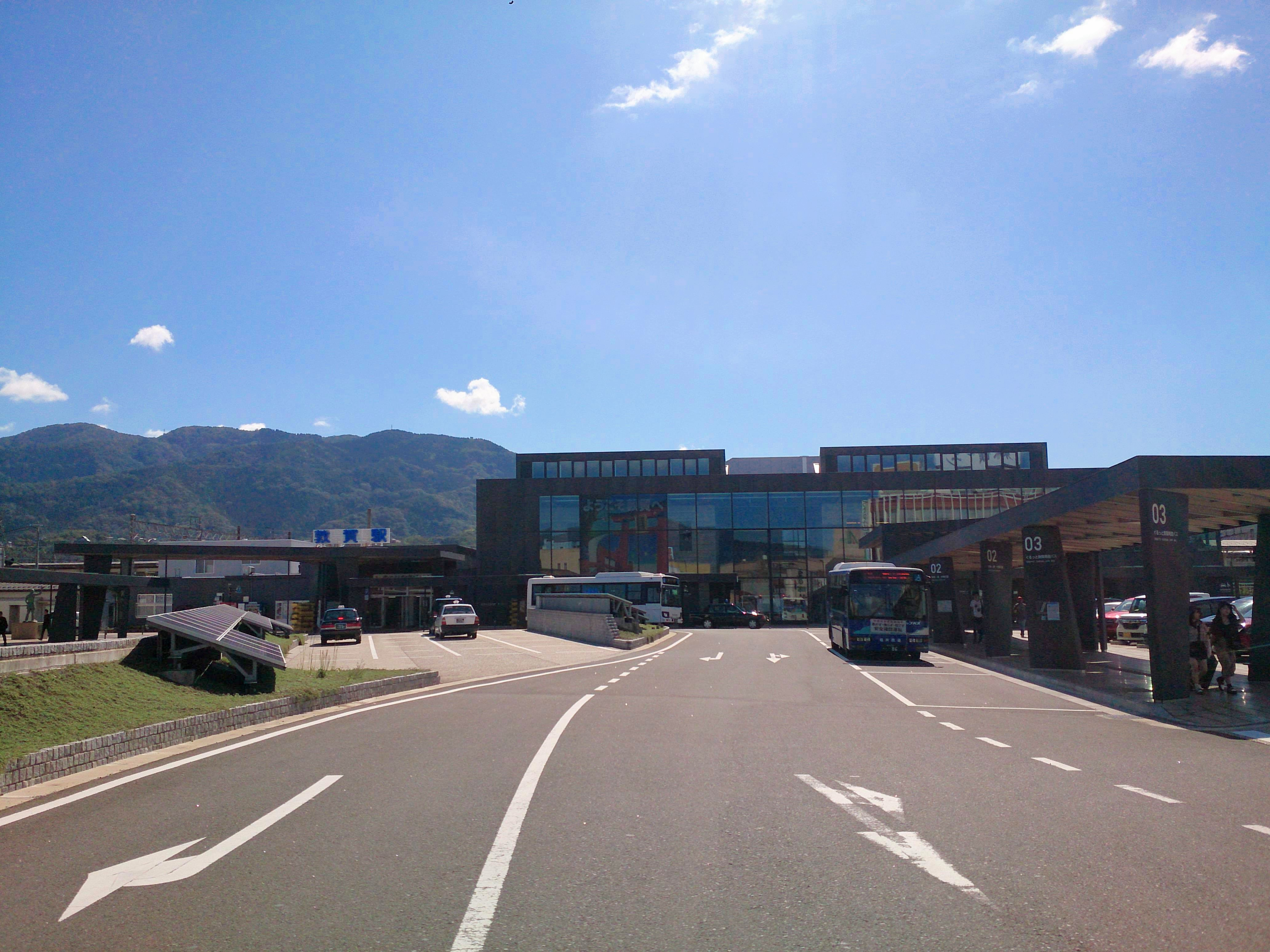
2010s station buildings in September 2018

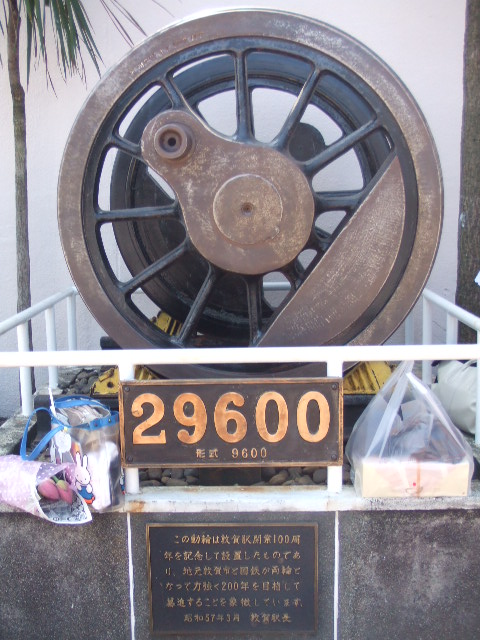
Driving wheel monument in August 2006

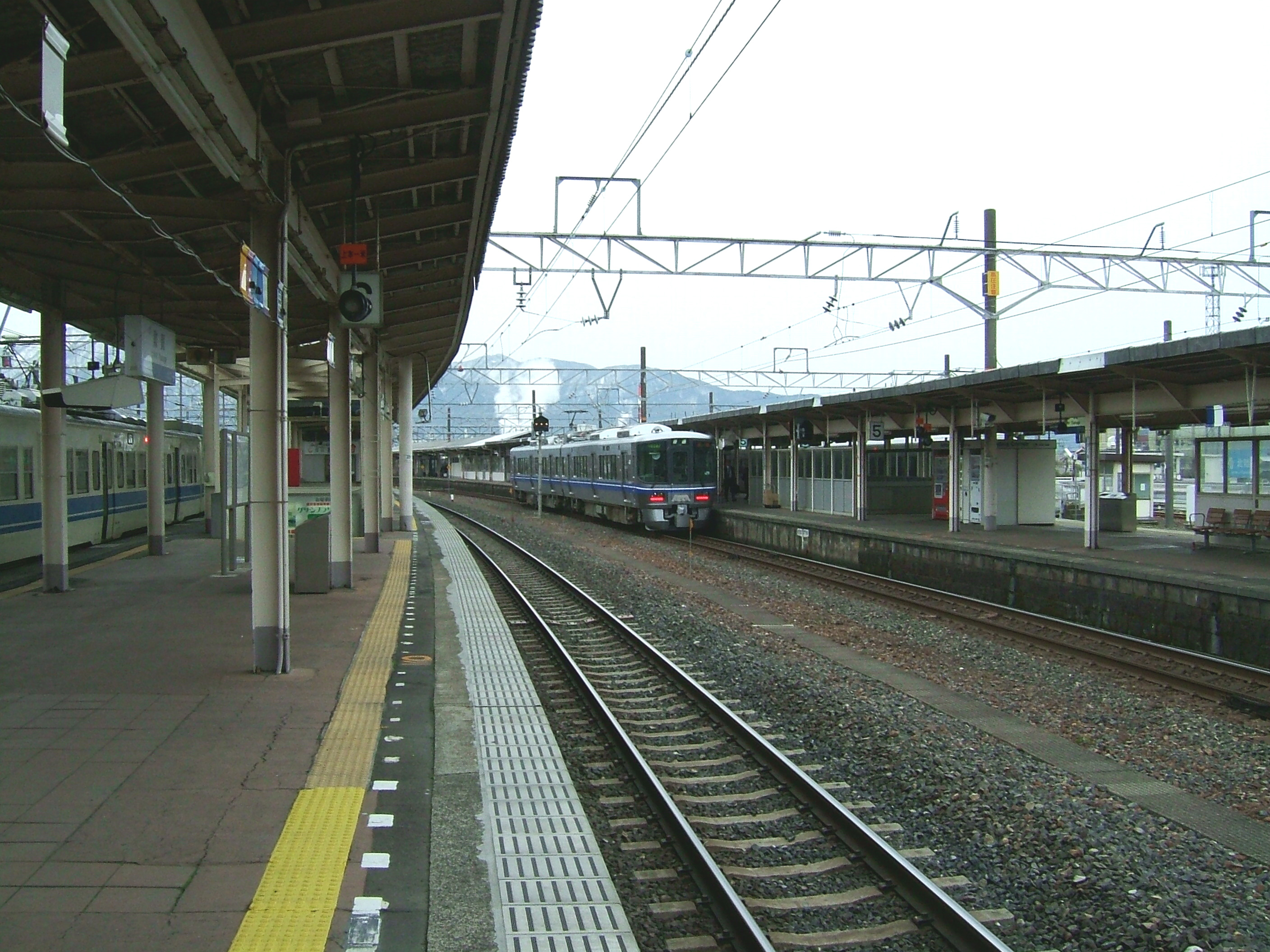
Conventional line platforms in March 2007

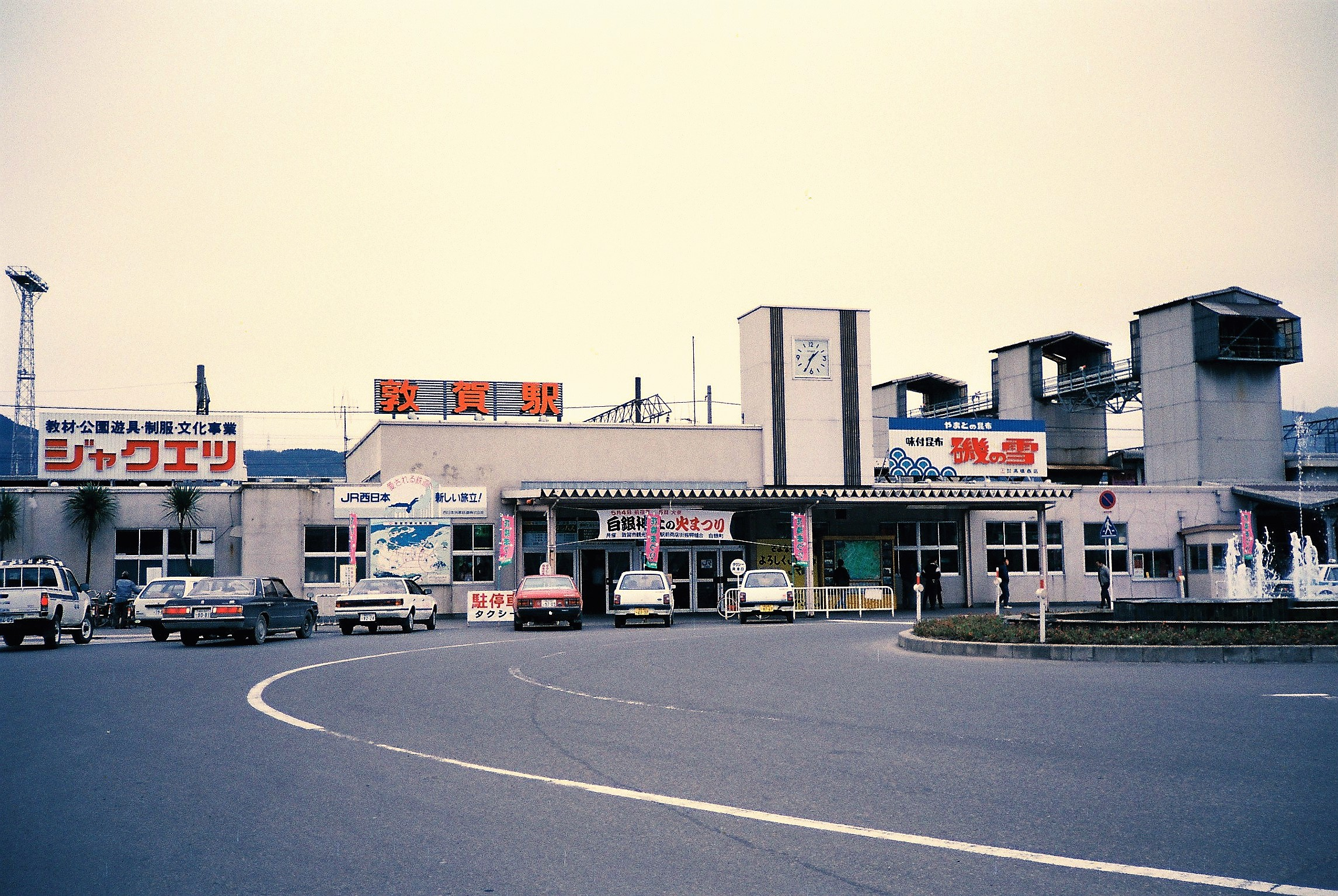
Station building in 1987

== History ==
Tsuruga Station opened on 10 March 1882. With the privatization of JNR on 1 April 1987, the station came under the control of JR West.

In 2014, JR West inaugurated a 180 meter long variable gauge test track within the yards of the station, on which an experimental variable-gauge bogie could be moved on trial runs through gauge-change equipment by a locomotive. The aim was to assist the development of a Gauge Change Train appropriate for the snowy Hokuriku environment that would enable through services at the station between the standard-gauge Hokuriku Shinkansen and the narrow-gauge Hokuriku Main Line. However, Japan abandoned the consideration of gauge-changing Shinkansen in 2018.

Station numbering was introduced in March 2018 with Tsuruga being assigned station number JR-A01 for the Hokuriku Main Line and JR-B08 for the Kosei Line (despite the latter formally terminating at Omi-Shiotsu).

The Hokuriku Shinkansen was extended to Tsuruga Station effective the timetable revision on 16 March 2024. As of the same date, the Hapi-Line Fukui Line began operations on the section of the Hokuriku Main Line to Daishoji formerly owned by JR West.

== Passenger statistics ==
In fiscal 2016, the station was used by an average of 3,610 passengers daily (boarding passengers only).

== Surrounding area ==
- Tsuruga Public Library
- Fukui University, Tsuruga campus

== See also ==
- List of railway stations in Japan
