= Awaran (disambiguation) =

Awaran is a city in Balochistan, Pakistan.

Awaran may also refer to:

- Awaran Tehsil, a tehsil of district Awaran.
- Awaran District, an administrative unit of Balochistan, Pakistan

== See also ==
- Avaran (disambiguation)
- Awara (disambiguation)
- Awara, Fukui, a human settlement in Japan.
