= Imajō Station =

Railway station in Minamiechizen, Fukui Prefecture, Japan

Imajō Station 今庄駅
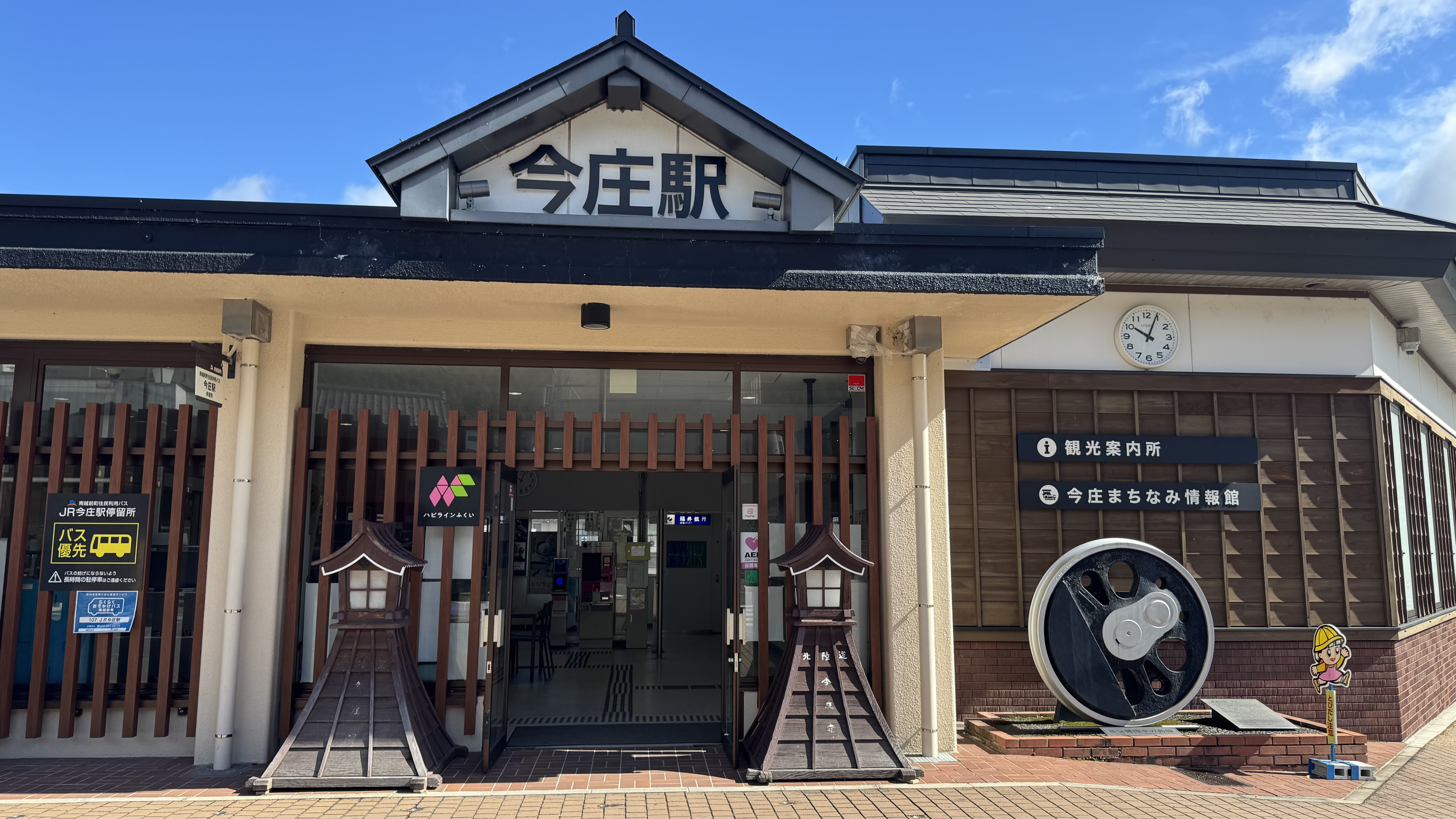
- Imajō Station in October 2025

General information
- Location: 74-6 Imajō, Minamiechizen-chō, Nanjō-gun, Fukui-ken 919-0131; Japan
- Coordinates: 35.7734°N 136.1993°E
- Operator: Hapi-Line Fukui
- Line: Hapi-Line Fukui Line
- Distance: 19.2 km from Tsuruga
- Platforms: 1 side + 1 island platform
- Tracks: 3

Other information
- Status: Staffed
- Website: Official website

History
- Opened: 15 July 1896

Passengers
- FY2016: 165 daily

Services
Preceding station	Hapi-Line Fukui	Following station
Tsuruga One-way operation	Hapi-Line Fukui Line Rapid	Takefu towards Daishōji
Tsuruga Terminus	Hapi-Line Fukui Line Regional Rapid	Nanjō towards Fukui
Minami-Imajō towards Tsuruga	Hapi-Line Fukui Line Local	Yunoo towards Daishōji
Location
- Location within Japan

Imajō Station (今庄駅, Imajō-eki) is a railway station on the Hapi-Line Fukui Line in the town of Minamiechizen, Fukui Prefecture, Japan, operated by the Hapi-Line Fukui.

== Lines ==
Imajō Station is served by the Hapi-Line Fukui Line, and is located 19.2 kilometers from the terminus of the line at Tsuruga.

== Station layout ==
The station consists of one side platform and one island platform connected to the station building by a footbridge. The station is staffed.

=== Platforms ===
1	■ Hapi-Line Fukui Line	for Fukui and Kanazawa
2, 3	■ Hapi-Line Fukui Line	for Tsuruga

== History ==
Imajō Station opened on 15 July 1896. With the privatization of Japanese National Railways (JNR) on 1 April 1987, the station came under the control of JR West.

Effective the 16 March 2024 timetable revision, this station is to be transferred to the Hapi-Line Fukui Line due to the opening of the western extension of the Hokuriku Shinkansen from Kanazawa to Tsuruga.

== Passenger statistics ==
In fiscal 2016, the station was used by an average of 165 passengers daily (boarding passengers only).

== Surrounding area ==
- Imajō-juku on the old Hokuriku-kaidō
- National Route 365
- National Route 476

== See also ==
- List of railway stations in Japan
