= Ōdoro Station =

Railway station in Fukui, Fukui Prefecture, Japan

Ōdoro Station 大土呂駅
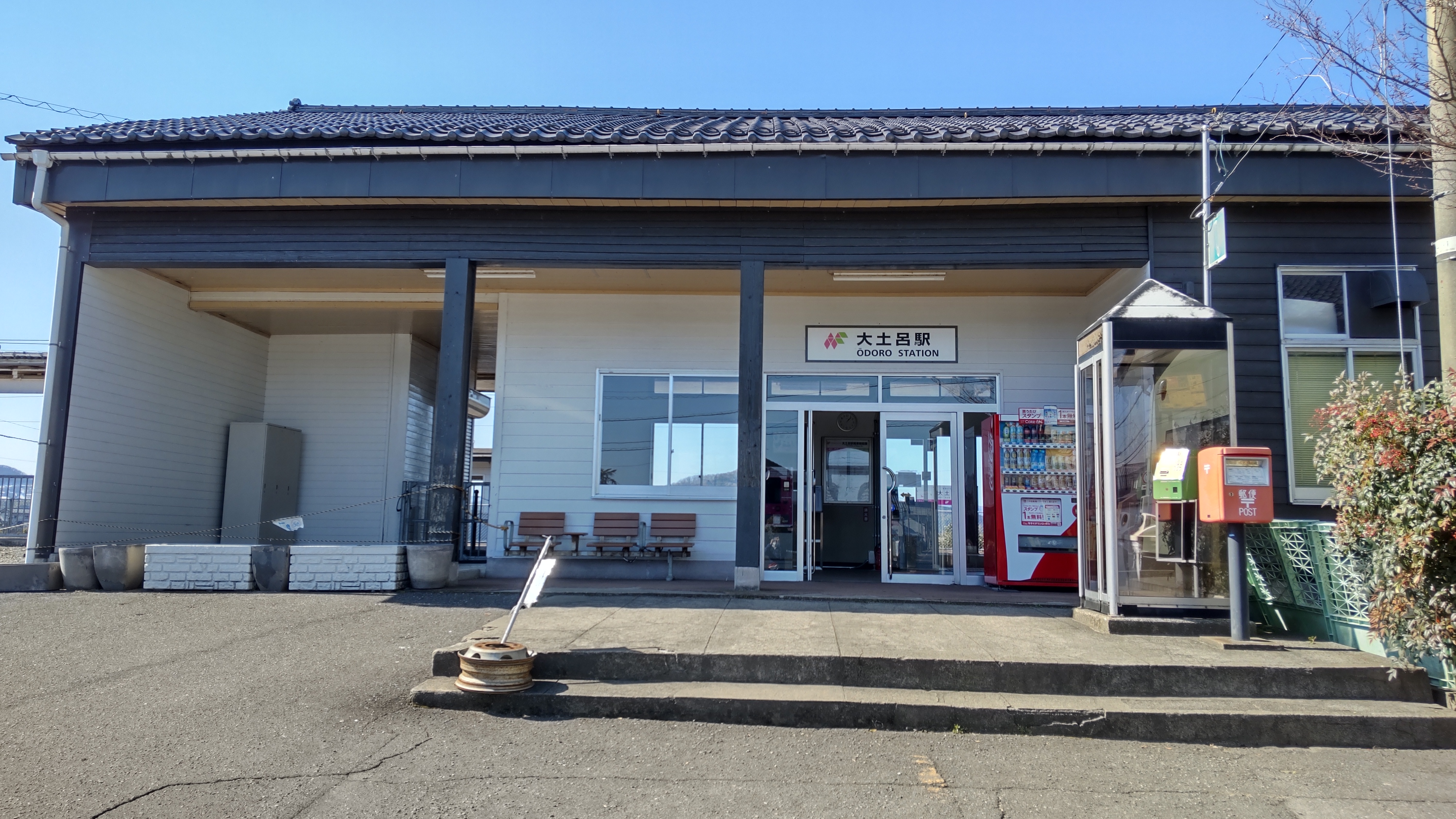
- Ōdoro Station in 2026

General information
- Location: Hanandō, Fukui-shi, Fukui-ken, 919-0326; Japan
- Coordinates: 36.0104°N 136.2166°E
- Operator: Hapi-Line Fukui
- Line: ■ Hapi-Line Fukui Line
- Distance: 48.2 km from Tsuruga
- Platforms: 2 side platforms
- Tracks: 2

Construction
- Structure type: Ground level

Other information
- Status: Unstaffed
- Website: Official website

History
- Opened: 15 July 1896

Passengers
- FY2016: 315 daily
Location
- Location within Japan

Ōdoro Station (大土呂駅, Ōdoro-eki) is a railway station on the Hapi-Line Fukui Line in the city of Fukui, Fukui Prefecture, Japan, operated by the Hapi-Line Fukui.

== Lines ==
Ōdoro Station is served by the Hapi-Line Fukui Line, and is located 48.2 kilometers from the terminus of the line at Tsuruga.

== Station layout ==
The station consists of two opposed side platforms connected by a footbridge. The station is unattended.

=== Platforms ===
1	■ Hapi-Line Fukui Line	for Takefu and Tsuruga
2	■ Hapi-Line Fukui Line	for Fukui and Kanazawa

== Adjacent stations ==
«	Service	»
Hapi-Line Fukui Line
Rapid: Does not stop at this station
Kita-Sabae	Local	Echizen-Hanandō

== History ==
Ōdoro Station opened on July 15, 1896. With the privatization of Japanese National Railways (JNR) on 1 April 1987, the station came under the control of JR West.

On 16 March 2024, this station was transferred to the Hapi-Line Fukui Line due to the opening of the western extension of the Hokuriku Shinkansen from Kanazawa to Tsuruga.

== Passenger statistics ==
In fiscal 2016, the station was used by an average of 315 passengers daily (boarding passengers only).

== Surrounding area ==
- Fukui Minami Prefectural High School
- Harmony Hall Fukui

== See also ==
- List of railway stations in Japan
