= Shikibu Station =

Railway station in Echizen, Fukui Prefecture, Japan

Shikibu Station しきぶ駅
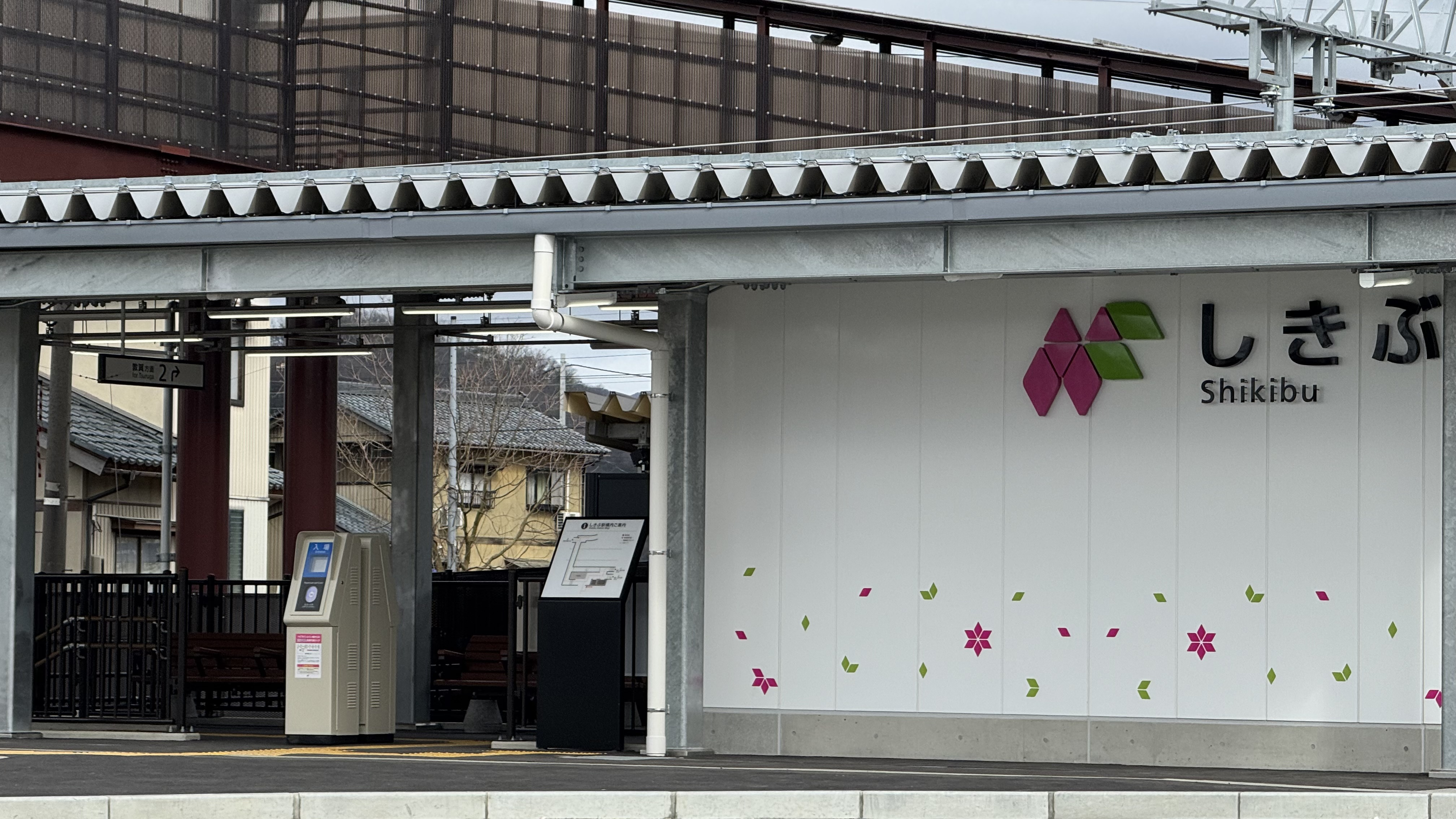
- The west side of Shikibu Station in March 2026

General information
- Location: Nawate-cho, Echizen-shi, Fukui-ken; Japan
- Coordinates: 35.887778°N 136.166389°E
- Operator: Hapi-Line Fukui
- Line: Hapi-Line Fukui Line
- Platforms: 2 side platforms
- Tracks: 2

Other information
- Website: Official website

History
- Opened: 14 March 2026

Services
| Preceding station | Hapi-Line Fukui | Following station |
|---|---|---|
| Nanjo towards Tsuruga | Hapi-Line Fukui Line Rapid | Takefu One-way operation |
| Nanjo towards Tsuruga | Hapi-Line Fukui Line Regional Rapid | Takefu towards Fukui |
| Ōshio towards Tsuruga | Hapi-Line Fukui Line Local | Takefu towards Daishōji |
Location
- Location within Japan

Shikibu Station (しきぶ駅, Shikibu-eki) is an infill railway station in the city of Echizen, Fukui, Japan, operated by Hapi-Line Fukui. It is projected to be used by around 570 passengers daily.

== Lines ==
Shikibu Station is served by the Hapi-Line Fukui Line, and is located 1.7 kilometres from Takefu.

== Station layout ==
The station consists of two opposing side platforms serving two tracks. The platforms are 85 metres long and capable of accommodating trains that are up to four cars long.

== History ==
A public naming competition of the proposed new station between Ōshio and Takefu took place between August and September 2023.

The finalised station name was announced on 8 February 2024.

Initially scheduled to open in around March 2025, the station commenced operations on 14 March 2026.

== Surrounding area ==
- Fukui Prefectural Takefu Commercial and Technical High School
- Murasaki Shikibu Park
