= Avaran =

Avaran may refer to:

- Avaran, Qusar, a village in Azerbaijan

== See also ==
- Eleazar Avaran, a Biblical figure
- Awaran (disambiguation), places in Pakistan
- Abaran (disambiguation)
