= Minami-Imajō Station =

Railway station in Minamiechizen, Fukui Prefecture, Japan

Minami-Imajō Station 南今庄駅
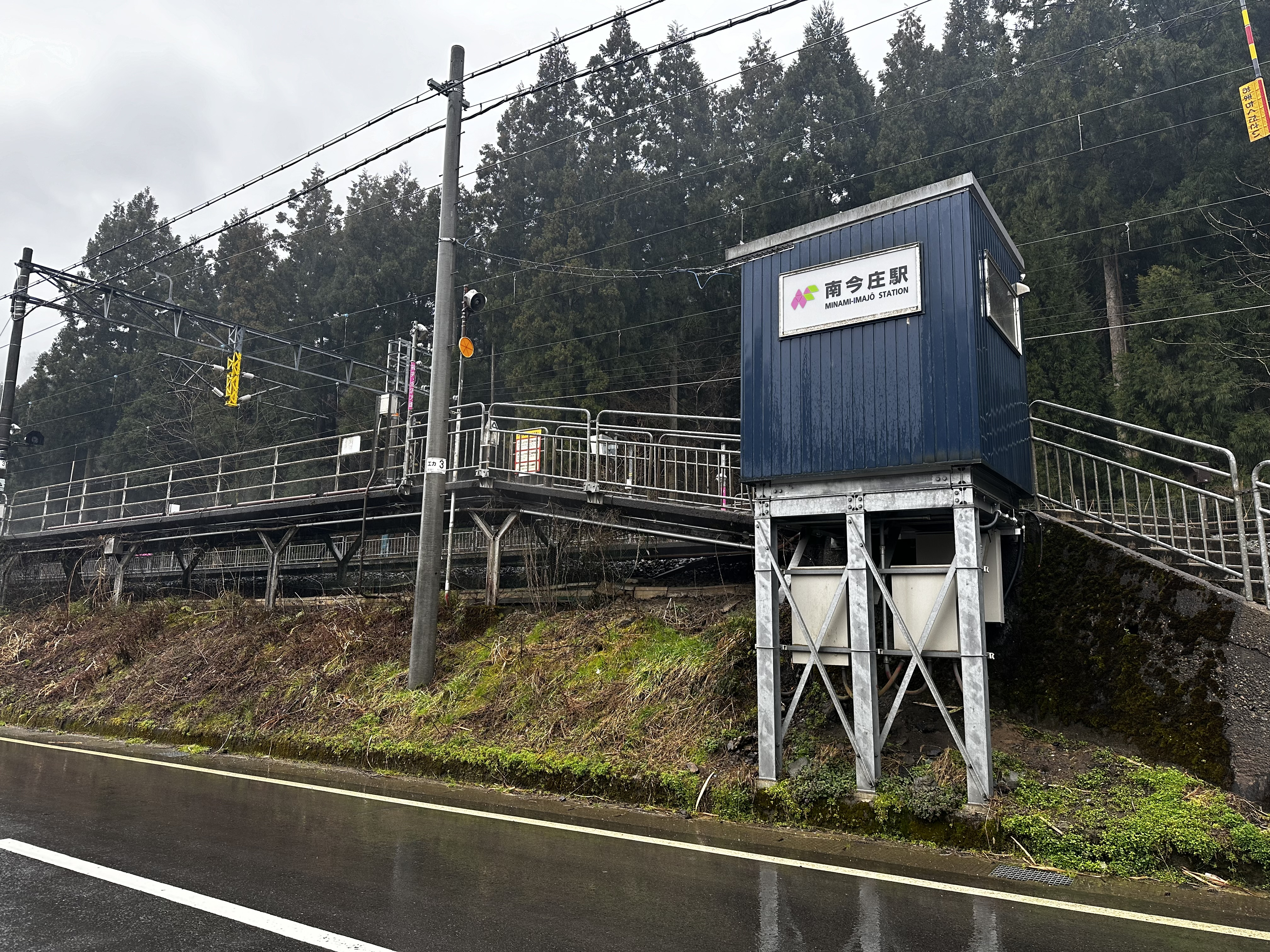
- Minami-Imajō Station shortly after its handover from JR West in March 2024

General information
- Location: 7-10 Imajō, Minamiechizen-chō, Nanjō-gun, Fukui-ken 919-0135; Japan
- Coordinates: 35°45′27″N 136°11′5″E
- Operator: Hapi-Line Fukui
- Line: ■ Hapi-Line Fukui Line
- Distance: 16.6 km from Tsuruga
- Platforms: 2 side platforms
- Tracks: 2

Construction
- Structure type: Ground level

Other information
- Status: Unstaffed
- Website: Official website

History
- Opened: 10 June 1962

Passengers
- FY2016: 16 daily
Location
- Location within Japan

Minami-Imajō Station (南今庄駅, Minamiimajō-eki) is a railway station on the Hapi-Line Fukui Line in the town of Minamiechizen, Fukui Prefecture, Japan, operated by the Hapi-Line Fukui.

== Lines ==
Minami-Imajō Station is served by the Hapi-Line Fukui Line, and is located 16.6 kilometers from the terminus of the line at Tsuruga.

== Station layout ==
The station consists of two opposed side platform connected by a level crossing. There is no station building. The station is unattended.

=== Platforms ===
| 1 | ■ Hapi-Line Fukui Line | for Fukui and Kanazawa |
| 2 | ■ Hapi-Line Fukui Line | for Tsuruga |

== Adjacent stations ==
| « | Service | » |
Hapi-Line Fukui Line
Rapid: Does not stop at this station
| Tsuruga | Local | Imajō |

== History ==
Minami-Imajō Station opened on 10 June 1962. With the privatization of Japanese National Railways (JNR) on 1 April 1987, the station came under the control of JR West.

Effective the 16 March 2024 timetable revision, this station is to be transferred to the Hapi-Line Fukui Line due to the opening of the western extension of the Hokuriku Shinkansen from Kanazawa to Tsuruga.

== Passenger statistics ==
In fiscal 2016, the station was used by an average of 16 passengers daily (boarding passengers only).

== Surrounding area ==
- Hokuriku Tunnel

== See also ==
- List of railway stations in Japan
