= Awarapan (disambiguation) =

Awarapan is a 2007 Indian film by Mohit Suri.

Awarapan (transl. Vagrancy) may also refer to:

- Awarapan 2, 2026 Indian film by Nitin Kakkar and a sequel to Awarapan
  - "Yeh Awarapan", title track of the 2026 film by Arijit Singh
  - Awarapan 2 (soundtrack), soundtrack of the 2026 film

== See also ==
- Awara (disambiguation)
- Awara Paagal Deewana, a 2002 Indian film by Vikram Bhatt
