= Awara =

Awara, Awaara or Aawara may refer to:

== People ==
- Awara, the title of the traditional ruler of Iwara Ijesha people of Nigeria.
- Darshan Singh Awara (1906–1982), Indian poet
- Sumie Awara (born 1952), Japanese athlete

== Arts and entertainment ==
- Awaara, a 1951 Indian Hindi film
- Awara (film), a 2012 Indian Bengali-language film
- Awara, a Telugu-dubbed version of the 2010 Tamil film Paiyaa
- Awara (album), by Arjan Dhillon, 2021

== Other uses ==
- Awara (wasp), a genus of insects
- Awara, Fukui, a city in Japan
- Awara language, spoken in Papua New Guinea
- Astrocaryum vulgare, or Awara, a spiny palm native to the Guianas and the Amazon
- Awara broth, a typical Guianan Creole stew

== See also ==
- Awarapan (disambiguation)
- Awara Paagal Deewana, a 2002 Indian film by Vikram Bhatt
