= Hapi-Line Fukui =

Third-sector Japanese railway company

- Native name: ハピラインふくい
- Type: Third-sector
- Genre: Rail transport
- Founded: 13 August 2019
- Headquarters: Fukui, Fukui, Japan
- Area served: Fukui Prefecture
- Services: Passenger railway
- Website: Official website

Hapi-Line Fukui (株式会社ハピラインふくい, Kabushiki-gaisha Hapirain Fukui) is a Japanese third-sector railway company established in 2019 that operates passenger railway services on the section of the former JR West Hokuriku Main Line that lay within Fukui Prefecture. This section of the Hokuriku Main Line was separated from the JR West network on 16 March 2024, coinciding with the opening of the Hokuriku Shinkansen extension from Kanazawa to Tsuruga, and Hapi-Line Fukui trains began operation on that day.

== History ==
In preparation for the opening of the Hokuriku Shinkansen extension between Kanazawa and Tsuruga stations, the company was founded on 13 August 2019 to inherit the parallel section between Tsuruga and Daishōji stations on the Hokuriku Main Line. Its headquarters are located in the city of Fukui, Fukui Prefecture.

Shares in the company are owned by Fukui Prefecture, the cities of Fukui and Tsuruga, the Japan Railway Construction, Transport and Technology Agency, and private-sector businesses.

Hapi-Line Fukui paid JR West ¥7 billion (US$63.78 million) to purchase the station buildings, tracks, and rolling stock. At this time, the company announced an expected annual income of ¥1.8 billion, primarily from passenger fares. As of April 2024, 75% of Hapi-Line Fukui's income comes from commuter passes, including student passes. JR Freight continue to pays the company track usage fees for over 30 freight trains per day. Long-term, the company aims for a stable annual revenue of ¥4 billion.

Along with the takeover from JR, Hapi-Line Fukui introduced rapid trains, and increased the number of trains running on the line from 102 to 132.

The company has collaborated with other railways in the prefecture, namely Echizen Railway and Fukui Railway (Fukutetsu), to consolidate purchasing and construction contracts, saving an estimated 5% .

== Hapi-Line Fukui Line ==
Hapi-Line Fukui Line

Overview
- Native name: ハピラインふくい線
- Owner: Hapi-Line Fukui
- Locale: Fukui Prefecture, Ishikawa Prefecture
- Termini: Tsuruga; Daishōji
- Stations: 21 (including freight stations)

Service
- Type: Regional rail
- Operator: Hapi-Line Fukui
- Rolling stock: 521 series EMUs

History
- Opened: 1 November 1898 (as Hokuriku Main Line); 16 March 2024 (as Hapi-Line Fukui Line)

Technical
- Line length: 84.3 km (52.4 mi)
- Track gauge: 1,067 mm (3 ft 6 in)
- Electrification: 20 kV AC (60 Hz)
Route map
\br

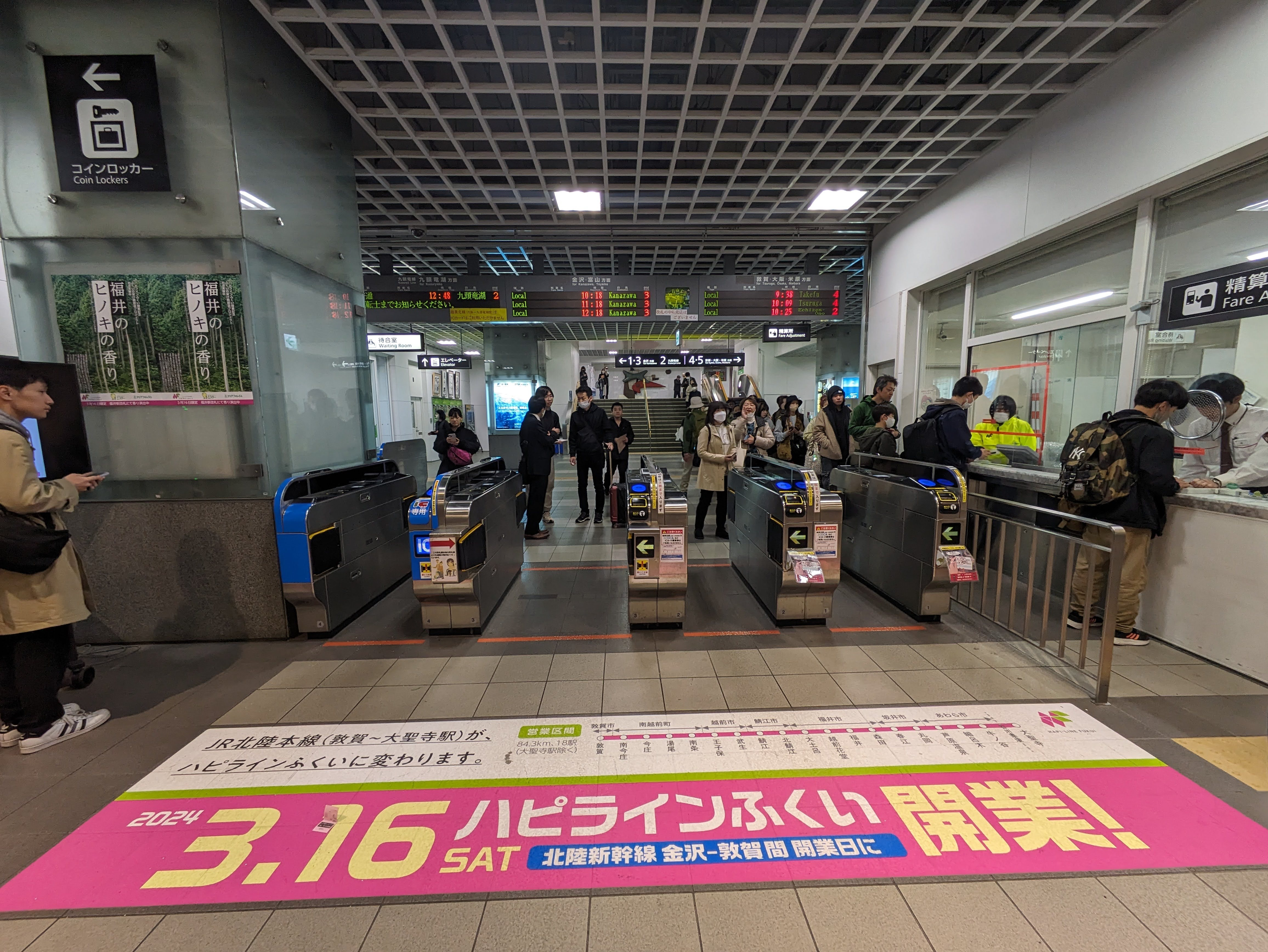
Ticket gates to the Hapi-Line Fukui platforms at Fukui Station on opening day

On 16 March 2024, Hapi-Line Fukui took over control of local passenger operations on the 84.3 km (52.4 mi) section JR West Hokuriku Main Line between Daishōji and Tsuruga, with 20 stations (the operation of Tsuruga Station remains under the control of JR West, while Daishōji Station was transferred to IR Ishikawa Railway). In addition, "Rapid" trains were introduced which operate during peak hours between Tsuruga and Fukui stopping only at major stations, saving around 10 minutes. In 2024, 5 northbound trips and 4 southbound trips of Rapid Service operated daily. From the start of the revised timetable on 14 March 2026, 4 of the 7 remaining daily Rapid services were replaced with Regional Rapid services.

All Hapi-Line Fukui trains arriving at Daishoji operate a through-service to the IR Ishikawa Railway Line to/from Kanazawa Station.

=== Service outline ===
As of March 2026 timetable, services are generally split into 2 sections:

- Tsuruga — Fukui
- Fukui — Daishoji, continuing as a through service to/from Kanazawa on the IR Ishikawa Railway Line.

In peak hours some Tsuruga — Fukui trains continue through to either Awaraonsen or Kanazawa.

Trains generally operate every 30 or 60 minutes off-peak, and more frequently during peak hours including short working Fukui — Awaraonsen services.

2 types of Rapid services operate on the line between Tsuruga and Fukui:

- Rapid: stops at limited stops on the entire section
- Regional Rapid: stops at some stations between Tsuruga and Shikibu, and all stations between Shikibu and Fukui

2 northbound trips and 1 southbound trip of Rapid service operate in the morning and 2 return Regional Rapid services operate in the evening.

Apart from the Rapid services, all services on the line are Local trains, stopping at all stations.

=== Stations ===
Aside from the northern terminus (Daishoji), all stations are located in Fukui Prefecture.

Legend:

●	All trains stop
▲	Some trains stop
△	1 Tsuruga-bound train stops
▽	1 Fukui-bound train stops
｜	All trains pass

Station	Japanese name	Distance (km)	Regional Rapid	Rapid	Transfers	Location	
Tsuruga	敦賀	0.0	●	●	■ Obama Line; A Hokuriku Main Line; B Kosei Line; Hokuriku Shinkansen	Tsuruga	Fukui
Minami-Imajō	南今庄	16.6	｜	｜		Minamiechizen	Fukui
Imajō	今庄	19.2	●	▽		Minamiechizen	Fukui
Yunoo	湯尾	22.8	｜	｜		Minamiechizen	Fukui
Nanjō	南条	26.3	●	▲		Minamiechizen	Fukui
Ōshio	王子保	30.8	｜	｜		Echizen	Fukui
Shikibu	しきぶ	33.3	●	△		Echizen	Fukui
Takefu	武生	35.1	●	●	Fukui Railway Fukubu Line (Takefu-shin)	Echizen	Fukui
Sabae	鯖江	40.3	●	●		Sabae	Fukui
Kita-Sabae	北鯖江	43.5	●	｜		Sabae	Fukui
Ōdoro	大土呂	48.2	●	｜		Fukui	Fukui
Echizen-Hanandō	越前花堂	51.4	●	｜	■ Etsumi-Hoku (Kuzuryū) Line	Fukui	Fukui
Minami-Fukui Freight Terminal	南福井	52.2	｜	｜		Fukui	Fukui
Fukui	福井	54.0	●	●	Hokuriku Shinkansen; ■ Etsumi-Hoku (Kuzuryū) Line; Katsuyama Eiheiji Line & Mikuni Awara Line; Fukui Railway Fukubu Line (Fukui-eki)	Fukui	Fukui
Morita	森田	59.9				Fukui	Fukui
Harue	春江	62.2				Sakai	Fukui
Maruoka	丸岡	65.9				Sakai	Fukui
Awaraonsen	芦原温泉	71.7			Hokuriku Shinkansen	Awara	Fukui
Hosorogi	細呂木	75.5				Awara	Fukui
Ushinoya	牛ノ谷	78.6				Awara	Fukui
Daishōji	大聖寺	84.3			IR Ishikawa Railway Line	Kaga	Ishikawa
↓Through service to/from Kanazawa on the IR Ishikawa Railway Line↓

== Rolling stock ==
The company inherited 16 x 2-car 521 series EMU trainsets from JR West. The JR West livery of blue & white stripes was replaced with a pink skirt below a lime green band, along with pink and lime green petals from the Hapi-Line logo.

Services operate as either a 2-car train or a 4-car train (coupled set), as indicated in the published timetable.

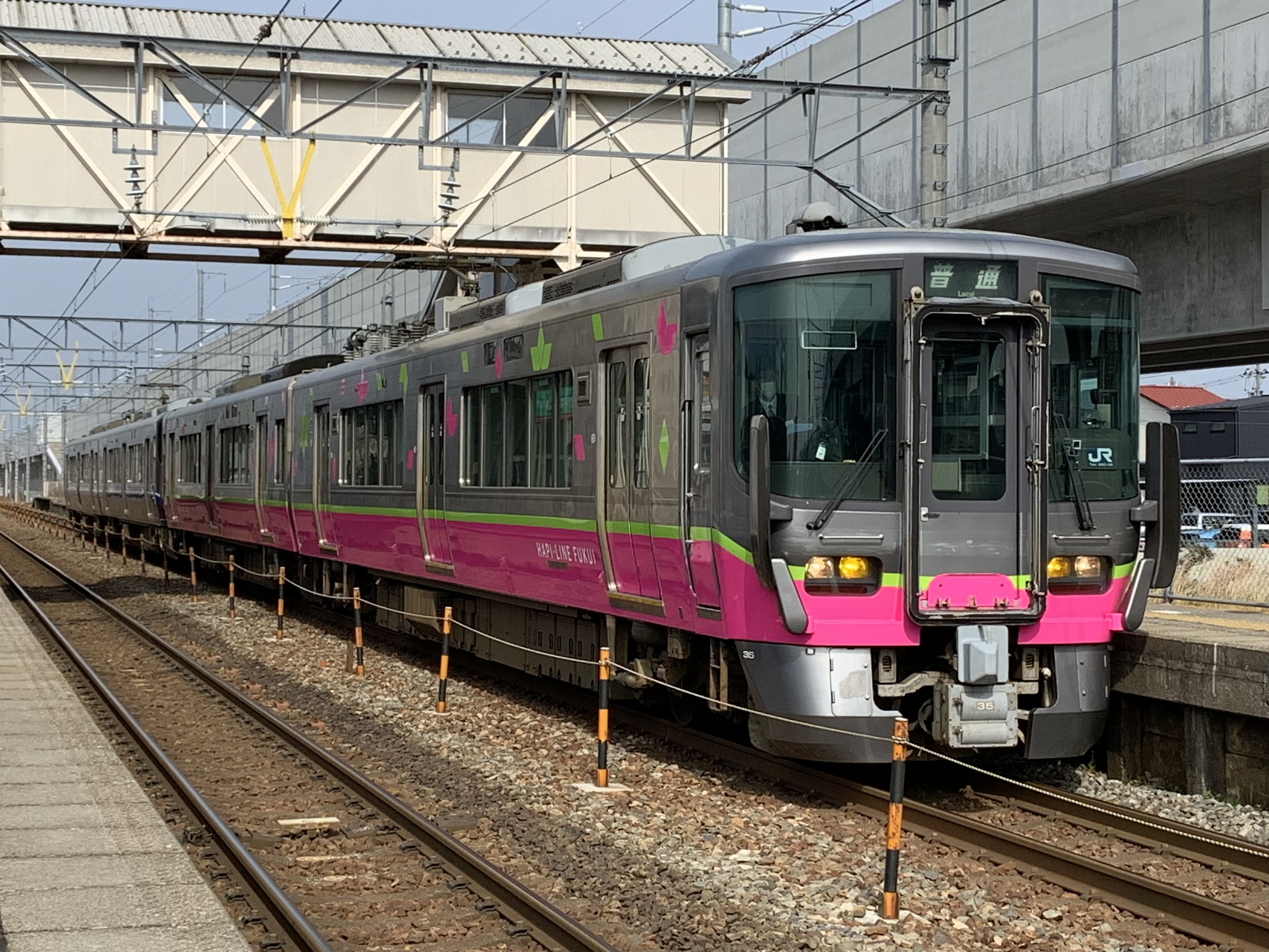
521 Series, Set HF05

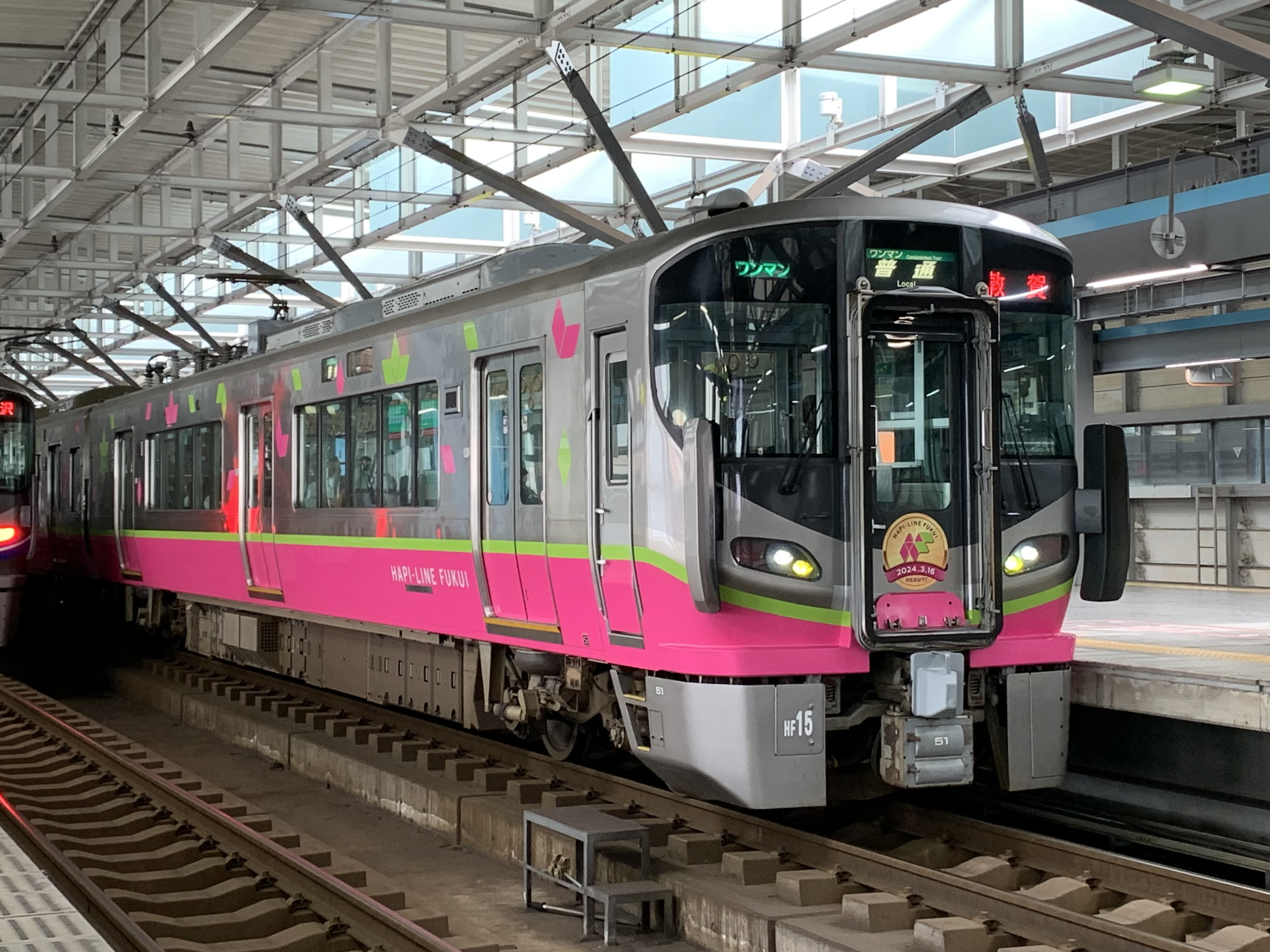
521 Series, Set HF15

== See also ==
- List of railway companies in Japan
- List of railway lines in Japan
