= Morita Station =

Railway station in Fukui, Fukui Prefecture, Japan

Morita Station 森田駅
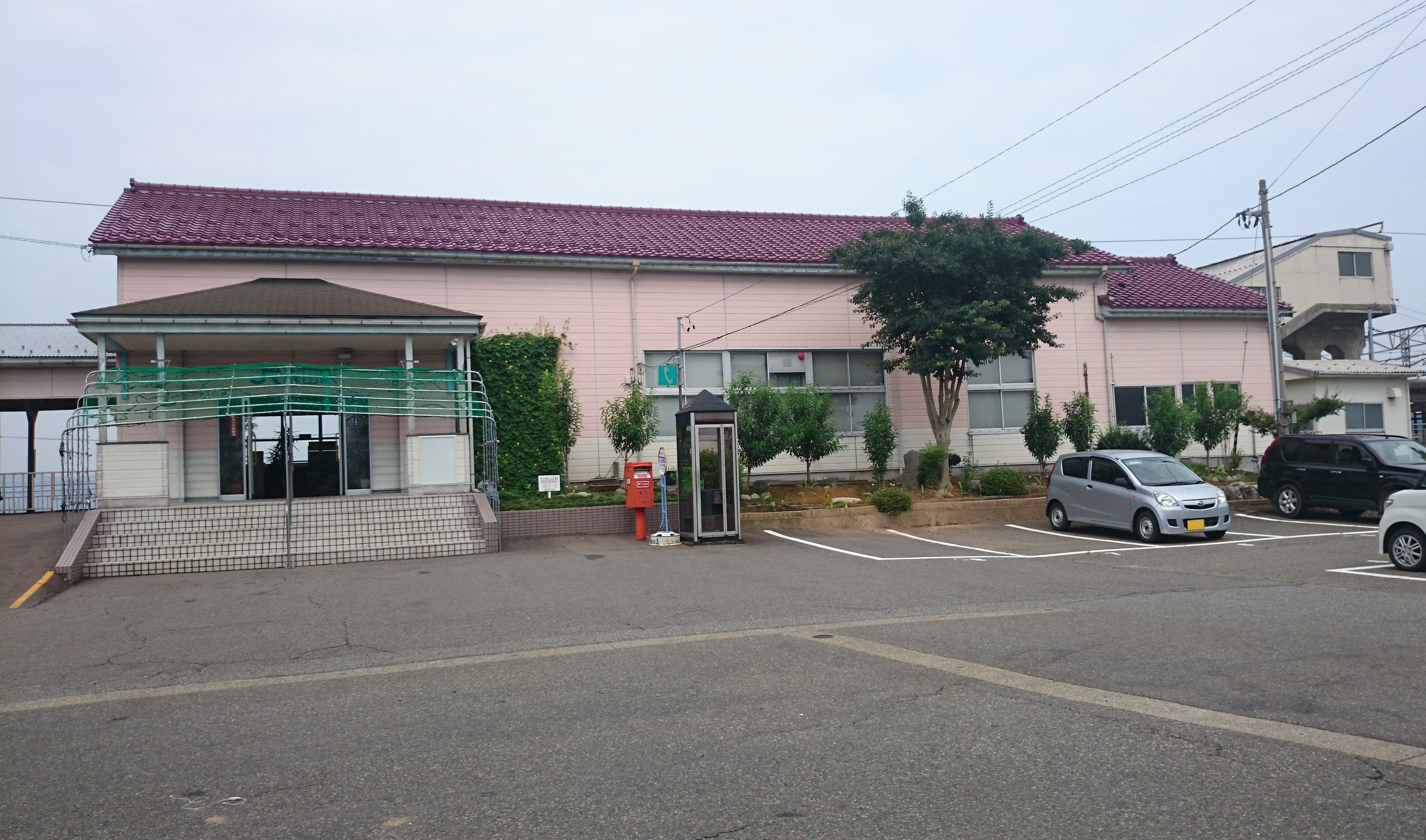
- Morita Station in August 2014

General information
- Location: 10-46, Sakae-chō, Fukui-shi, Fukui-ken 910-0151; Japan
- Coordinates: 36.1094°N 136.2226°E
- Operator: Hapi-Line Fukui
- Line: ■ Hapi-Line Fukui Line
- Distance: 59.9 km from Tsuruga
- Platforms: 2 side platforms
- Tracks: 2

Construction
- Structure type: Ground level

Other information
- Status: Staffed
- Website: Official website

History
- Opened: 20 September 1897

Passengers
- FY2016: 840 daily
Location
- Location within Japan

Morita Station (森田駅, Morita-eki) is a railway station on the Hapi-Line Fukui Line in the city of Fukui, Fukui Prefecture, Japan, operated by the Hapi-Line Fukui.

== Lines ==
Morita Station is served by the Hapi-Line Fukui Line, and is located 59.9 kilometers from the terminus of the line at Tsuruga.

== Station layout ==
The station consists of two unnumbered opposed side platforms connected by a footbridge. The station is not staffed.

=== Platforms ===
station side	■ Hapi-Line Fukui Line	for Fukui and Tsuruga
opposite side	■ Hapi-Line Fukui Line	for Kanazawa

== Adjacent stations ==
«	Service	»
Hapi-Line Fukui Line
Fukui	Local	Harue

== History ==
Morita Station opened on 20 September 1897. The station was destroyed by the 1948 Fukui earthquake, and was reopened the following year. With the privatization of Japanese National Railways (JNR) on 1 April 1987, the station came under the control of JR West.

On 16 March 2024, this station was transferred to the Hapi-Line Fukui Line due to the opening of the western extension of the Hokuriku Shinkansen from Kanazawa to Tsuruga.

== Passenger statistics ==
In fiscal 2016, the station was used by an average of 840 passengers daily (boarding passengers only).

== Surrounding area ==
- former Morita Town Hall
- Jin-ai Women's College

== See also ==
- List of railway stations in Japan
