= Harue Station =

Railway station in Sakai, Fukui Prefecture, Japan

Harue Station 春江駅
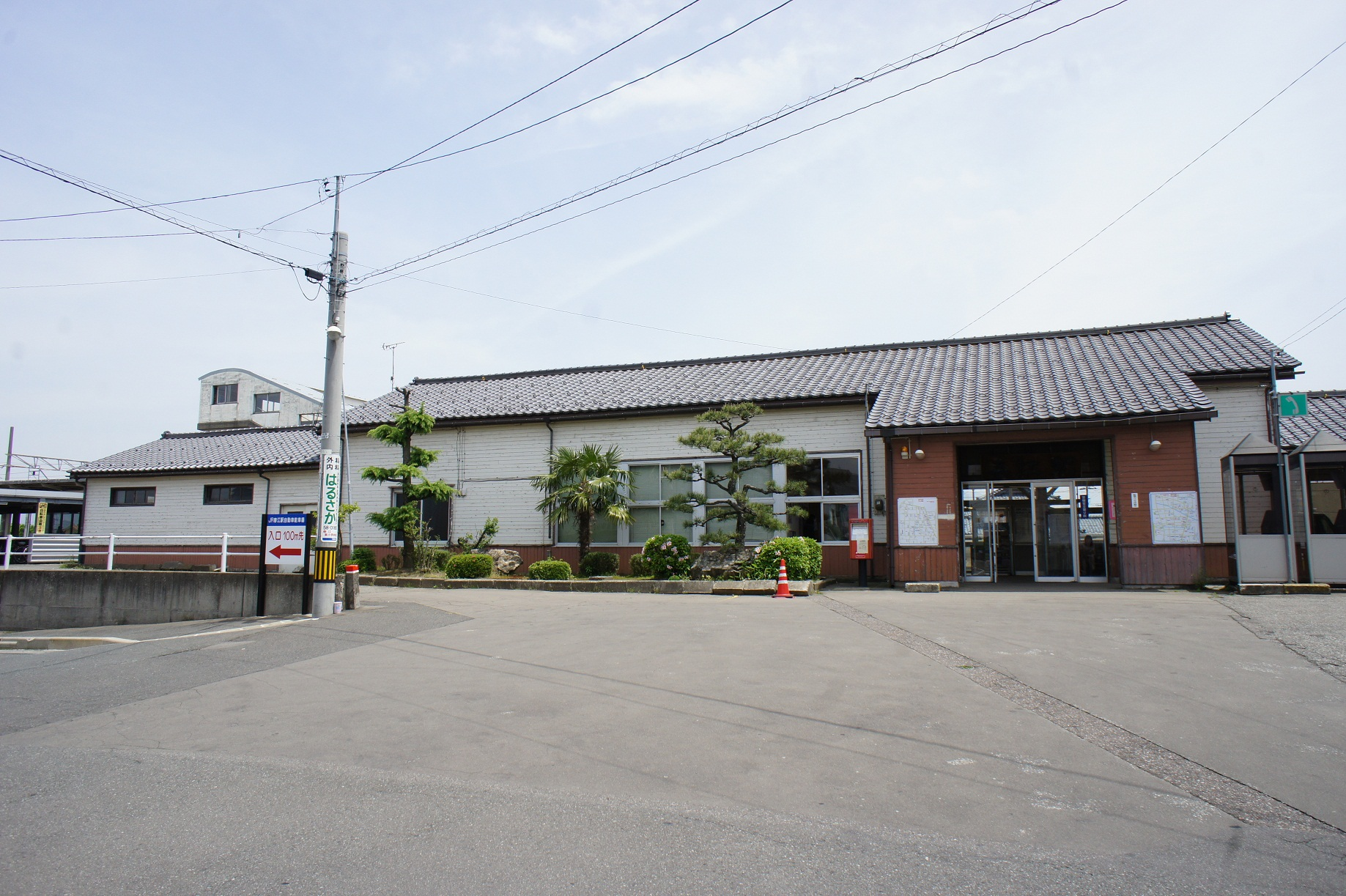
- Harue Station in May 2011

General information
- Location: Haruecho Nakasuji Sakai-shi, Fukui-ken, 919-0449; Japan
- Coordinates: 36.1291°N 136.2286°E
- Operator: Hapi-Line Fukui
- Line: ■ Hapi-Line Fukui Line
- Distance: 62.2 km from Tsuruga; 108.1 km from Maibara
- Platforms: 1 island platform
- Tracks: 2

Other information
- Status: Staffed
- Website: Official website

History
- Opened: 1 May 1926

Passengers
- FY2016: 1003 daily
Location
- Location within Japan

Harue Station (春江駅, Harue-eki) is a railway station on the Hapi-Line Fukui Line in the city of Sakai, Fukui Prefecture, Japan, operated by Hapi-Line Fukui.

== Lines ==
Harue Station is served by the Hapi-Line Fukui Line, and is located 62.2 kilometers from the terminus of the line at Tsuruga.

== Station layout ==
The station consists of one island platform connected by a footbridge. The station is staffed.

=== Platforms ===
1	■ Hapi-Line Fukui Line	for Kanazawa
2	■ Hapi-Line Fukui Line	for Fukui and Tsuruga

== Adjacent stations ==
«	Service	»
Hapi-Line Fukui Line
Morita	Local	Maruoka

== History ==
Harue Station opened on 1 May 1926. With the privatization of Japanese National Railways (JNR) on 1 April 1987, the station came under the control of JR West.

On 16 March 2024, this station was transferred to the Hapi-Line Fukui Line due to the opening of the western extension of the Hokuriku Shinkansen from Kanazawa to Tsuruga.

== Passenger statistics ==
In fiscal 2016, the station was used by an average of 1,003 passengers daily (boarding passengers only).

== Surrounding area ==
- Harue Elementary School
- Harue Middle School

== See also ==
- List of railway stations in Japan
