= Maruoka Station =

Railway station in Sakai, Fukui Prefecture, Japan

Maruoka Station 丸岡駅
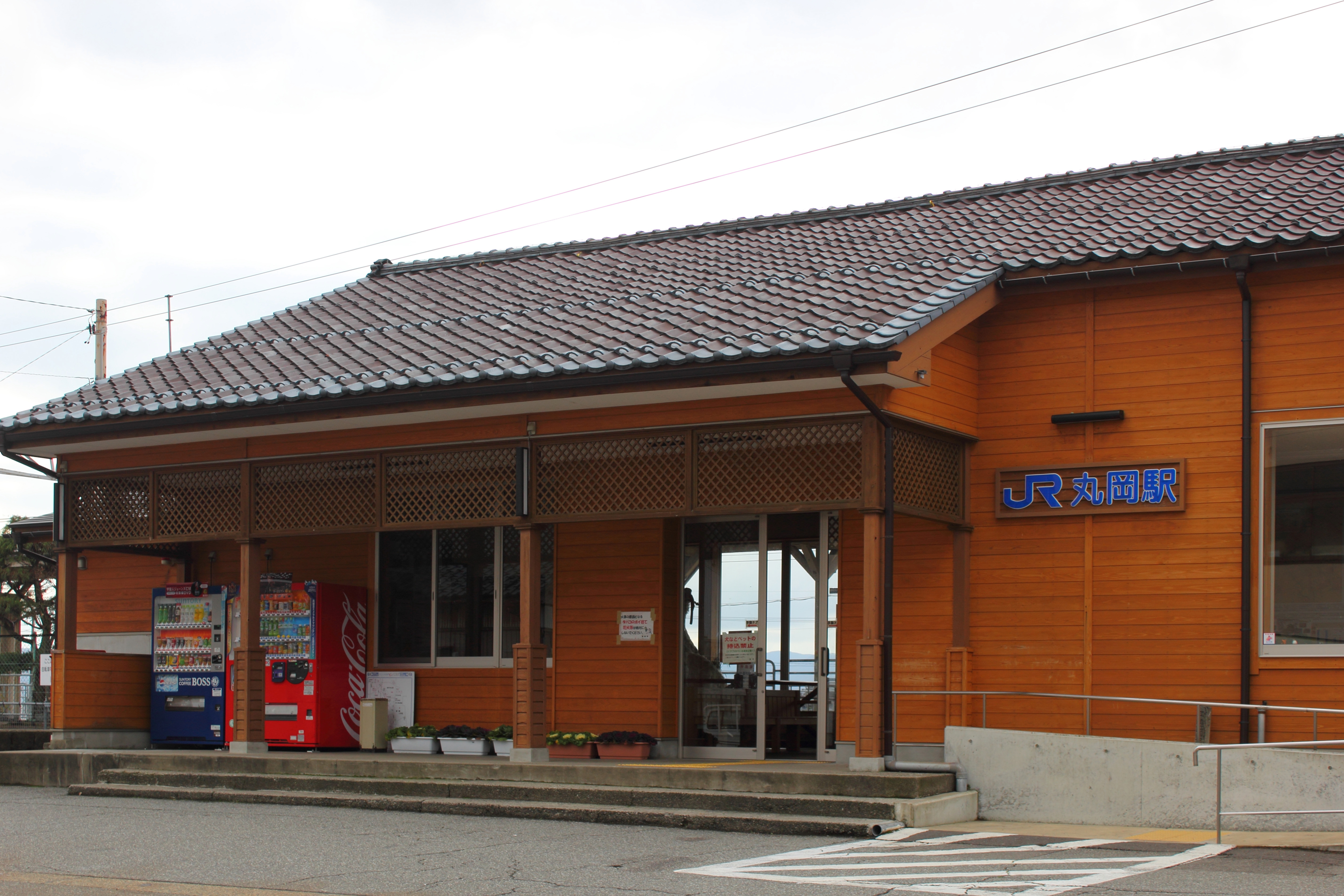

General information
- Location: Kamishinjo Sakai-shi, Fukui-ken, 919-0522; Japan
- Coordinates: 36.1620°N 136.2326°E
- Operator: Hapi-Line Fukui
- Line: ■ Hapi-Line Fukui Line
- Distance: 65.9 km from Tsuruga
- Platforms: 2 side platform
- Tracks: 2

Construction
- Structure type: Ground level

Other information
- Status: Staffed
- Website: Official website

History
- Opened: 20 September 1897

Passengers
- FY2016: 1112 daily
Location
- Location within Japan

Maruoka Station (丸岡駅, Maruoka-eki) is a railway station on the Hapi-Line Fukui Line in the city of Sakai, Fukui Prefecture, Japan, operated by the Hapi-Line Fukui.

== Lines ==
Maruoka Station is served by the Hokuriku Main Line, and is located 65.9 kilometers from the terminus of the line at Tsuruga.

== Station layout ==
The station consists of two unnumbered side platforms connected by a footbridge. The station is staffed.

=== Platforms ===
1	■ Hapi-Line Fukui Line	for Fukui and Tsuruga
2	■ Hapi-Line Fukui Line	for Kanazawa

== Adjacent stations ==
«	Service	»
Hapi-Line Fukui Line
Harue	Local	Awaraonsen

== History ==
Maruoka Station opened on 20 September 1897 as Shinjō Station (新庄駅, Shinjō-eki). It was renamed to Maruoka Station on 15 February 1902. With the privatization of Japanese National Railways (JNR) on 1 April 1987, the station came under the control of JR West.

On 16 March 2024, this station was transferred to the Hapi-Line Fukui Line due to the opening of the western extension of the Hokuriku Shinkansen from Kanazawa to Tsuruga.

== Passenger statistics ==
In fiscal 2016, the station was used by an average of 1,112 passengers daily (boarding passengers only).

== Surrounding area ==
- Maruoka Castle
- Sakai Post Office

== See also ==
- List of railway stations in Japan
