= Hosorogi Station =

Railway station in Awara, Fukui Prefecture, Japan

Hosorogi Station 細呂木駅
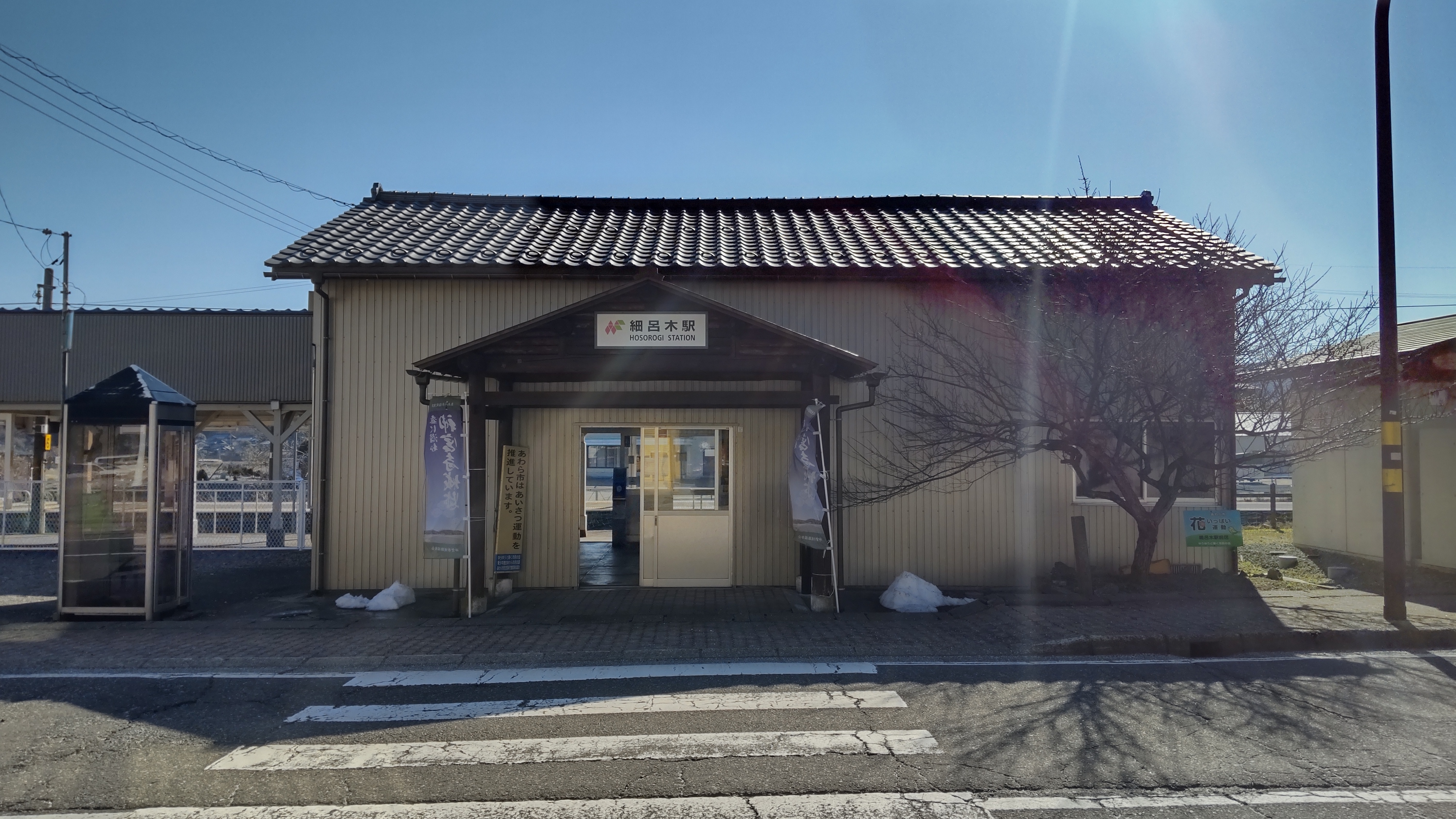
- Hosorogi Station in February 2026

General information
- Location: 40-43 Aonoki, Awara-shi, Fukui-ken 919-0814; Japan
- Coordinates: 36.2411°N 136.2572°E
- Operator: Hapi-Line Fukui
- Line: Hapi-Line Fukui Line
- Distance: 75.5 km from Tsuruga
- Platforms: 1 island platform
- Tracks: 2

Other information
- Status: Unstaffed
- Website: Official website

History
- Opened: September 20, 1897

Passengers
- FY2016: 60 daily

Services
Preceding station	Hapi-Line Fukui	Following station
Awaraonsen towards Tsuruga	Hapi-Line Fukui Line Local	Ushinoya towards Daishōji
Location
- Location within Japan

Hosorogi Station (細呂木駅, Hosorogi-eki) is a railway station on the Hapi-Line Fukui Line in the city of Awara, Fukui Prefecture, Japan, operated by the Hapi-Line Fukui.

== Lines ==
Hosorogi Station is served by the Hapi-Line Fukui Line, and is located 75.5 km (46.9 mi) from the terminus of the line at Tsuruga.

== Station layout ==
The station consists of one unnumbered island platform connected by a footbridge. The station is unattended.

=== Platforms ===
1	■ Hapi-Line Fukui Line	for Daishōji
2	■ Hapi-Line Fukui Line	for Fukui and Tsuruga

== History ==
The station opened on 20 September 1897. With the privatization of Japanese National Railways (JNR) on 1 April 1987, the station came under the control of JR West.

From the start of the revised timetable on 16 March 2024, this station was transferred to the Hapi-Line Fukui Line due to the opening of the western extension of the Hokuriku Shinkansen from Kanazawa to Tsuruga.

== Passenger statistics ==
In fiscal 2016, the station was used by an average of 60 passengers daily (boarding passengers only).

== Surrounding area ==
- Hosorogi Post Office

== See also ==
- List of railway stations in Japan
