= Ushinoya Station =

Railway station in Awara, Fukui Prefecture, Japan

Ushinoya Station 牛ノ谷駅
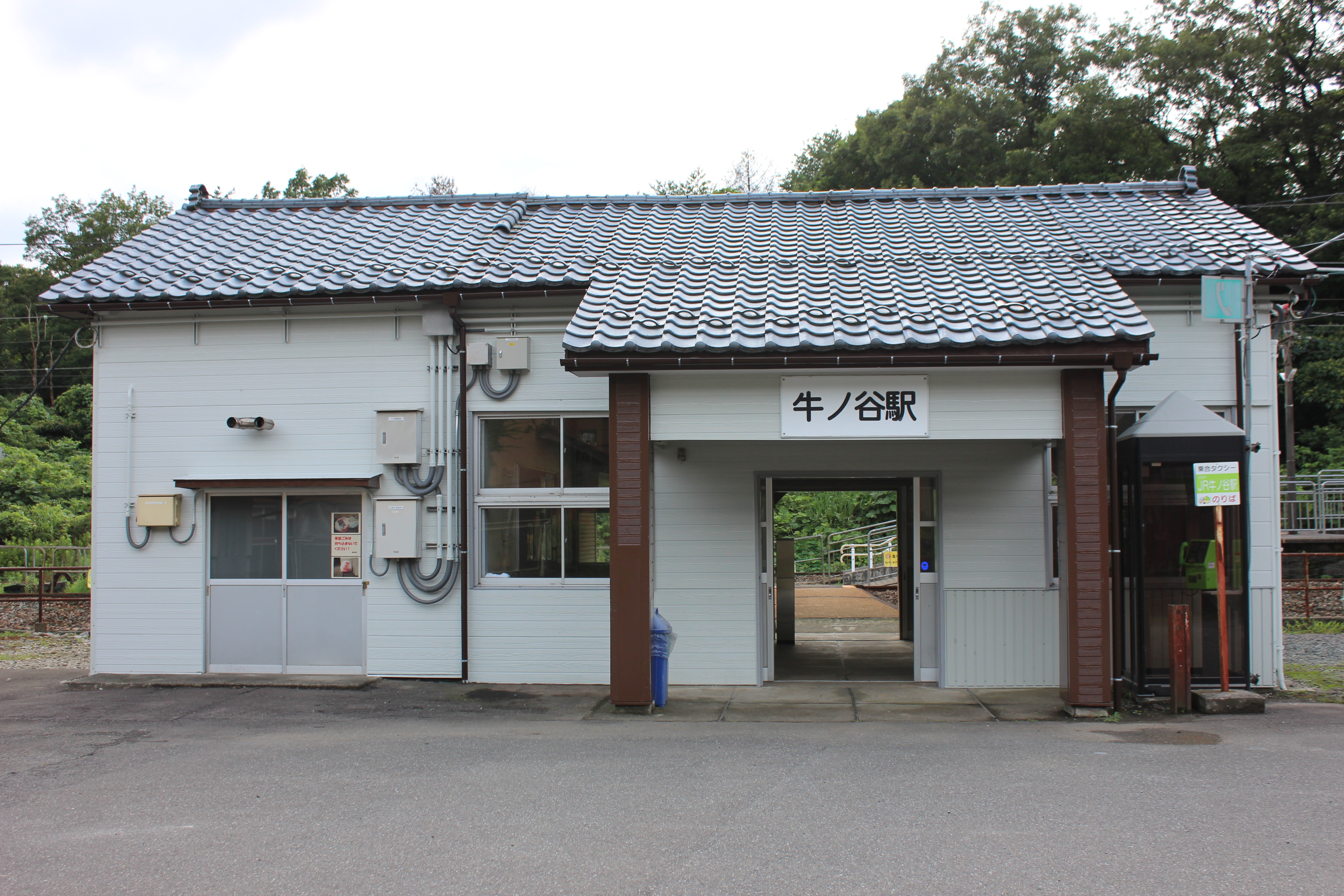
- Ushinoya Station in July 2020

General information
- Location: Ushinoya, Awara-shi, Fukui-ken 919-0721; Japan
- Coordinates: 36.2596°N 136.2814°E
- Operator: Hapi-Line Fukui
- Line: Hapi-Line Fukui Line
- Distance: 78.6 km from Tsuruga
- Platforms: 1 island platform
- Tracks: 2

Construction
- Structure type: At grade

Other information
- Status: Unstaffed
- Website: Official website

History
- Opened: April 15, 1921

Passengers
- FY2016: 18 daily

Services
Preceding station	Hapi-Line Fukui	Following station
Hosorogi towards Tsuruga	Hapi-Line Fukui Line Local	Daishōji Terminus
Location
- Location within Japan

Ushinoya Station (牛ノ谷駅, Ushinoya-eki) is a railway station on the Hapi-Line Fukui Line in the city of Awara, Fukui Prefecture, Japan, operated by Hapi-Line Fukui.

== Lines ==
Ushinoya Station is served by the Hapi-Line Fukui Line, and is located 78.6 kilometers from the terminus of the line at Tsuruga.

== Station layout ==
The station consists of one unnamed island platform connected by a level crossing. The station is unattended.

=== Platforms ===
1	■ Hapi-Line Fukui Line	for Fukui and Tsuruga
2	■ Hapi-Line Fukui Line	for Kanazawa

== History ==
The station opened on 15 April 1921. With the privatization of Japanese National Railways (JNR) on 1 April 1987, the station came under the control of JR West.

Effective the 16 March 2024 timetable revision, this station was transferred to the Hapi-Line Fukui Line due to the opening of the western extension of the Hokuriku Shinkansen from Kanazawa to Tsuruga.

== Passenger statistics ==
In fiscal 2016, the station was used by an average of 18 passengers daily (boarding passengers only).

== Surrounding area ==
- Hokuriku Expressway

== See also ==
- List of railway stations in Japan
