= Awaraonsen Station =

Railway station in Awara, Fukui Prefecture, Japan

Awaraonsen Station 芦原温泉駅
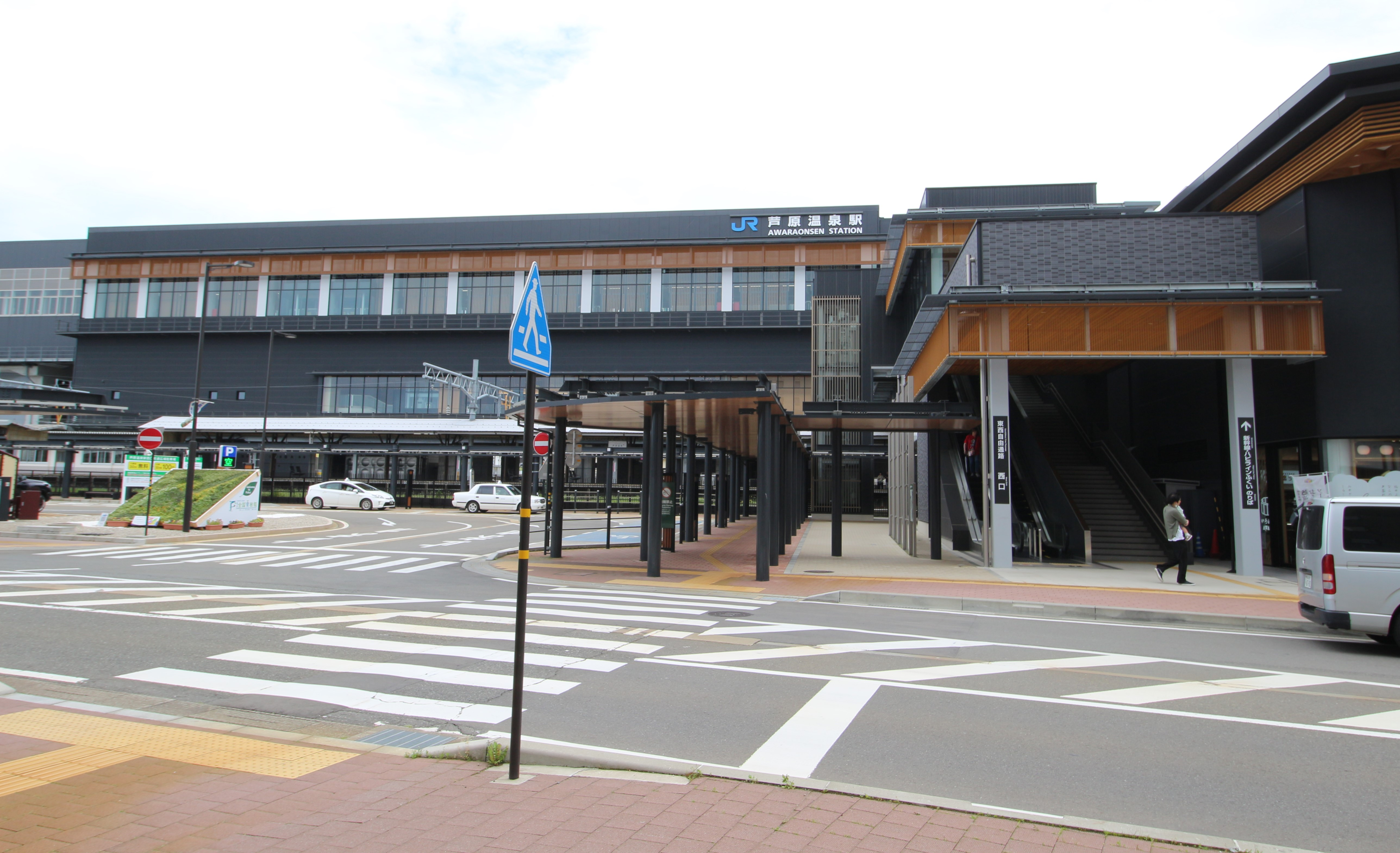
- West exit in May 2024

General information
- Location: 1-12 Harumiya, Awara, Fukui; Japan
- Coordinates: 36°12′52″N 136°14′06″E
- Operator: JR West; Hapi-Line Fukui
- Lines: Hokuriku Shinkansen; Hapi-Line Fukui Line
- Distance: 71.7 km (44.6 mi) from Tsuruga
- Platforms: 3
- Tracks: 5

Other information
- Status: Staffed ("Midori no Madoguchi")
- Website: Official website

History
- Opened: 20 September 1897; 129 years ago
- Former names: Kanazu (until 1972)

Passengers
- FY2016: 1,822 (daily)

Services
Preceding station	JR West	Following station
Fukui towards Tsuruga	Hokuriku Shinkansen Kagayaki	Kagaonsen towards Nagano
Fukui towards Tsuruga	Hokuriku Shinkansen Hakutaka	Kagaonsen towards Jōetsumyōkō
Fukui towards Tsuruga	Hokuriku Shinkansen Tsurugi	Kagaonsen towards Toyama
Location
- Location within Fukui Prefecture Location within Chubu region Location within Japan

Awaraonsen Station (芦原温泉駅, Awaraonsen-eki) is a railway station on the Hokuriku Main Line in the city of Awara, Fukui, Japan, operated by West Japan Railway Company (JR West).

== Lines ==
Awaraonsen Station is served by the Hapi-Line Fukui Line and is located 71.7 kilometers from the terminus of the line at Tsuruga. It is also served by the high-speed Hokuriku Shinkansen line.

== Station layout ==
The station has two island platforms with four tracks connected by a footbridge. It has a "Midori no Madoguchi" staffed ticket office.

=== Platforms ===
1-2	■ Hapi-Line Fukui Line	for Daishoji, Kanazawa (for Fukui)
3	■ Hapi-Line Fukui Line	for Fukui and Tsuruga

11	■ Hokuriku Shinkansen	for Kanazawa, Tokyo
12	■ Hokuriku Shinkansen	for Fukui and Tsuruga

== Adjacent stations ==
«	Service	»
Hapi-Line Fukui Line
Maruoka	Local	Hosorogi

== History ==
The station opened on 20 September 1897 as Kanazu Station (金津駅). It was renamed Awaraonsen Station on 15 March 1972. With the privatization of JNR on 1 April 1987, the station came under the control of JR West.

Effective the timetable revision on 16 March 2024, the Hokuriku Shinkansen began operations at the station while the facilities of the Hokuriku Main Line were transferred to Hapi-line Fukui. Also, due to the construction of the Hokuriku Shinkansen, platform 4 was removed.

== Passenger statistics ==
In fiscal 2016, the station was used by an average of 1,822 passengers daily (boarding passengers only).

== Surrounding area ==
- Awara City Hall

== See also ==
- List of railway stations in Japan
