= Yunoo Station =

Railway station in Minamiechizen, Fukui Prefecture, Japan

Yunoo Station 湯尾駅
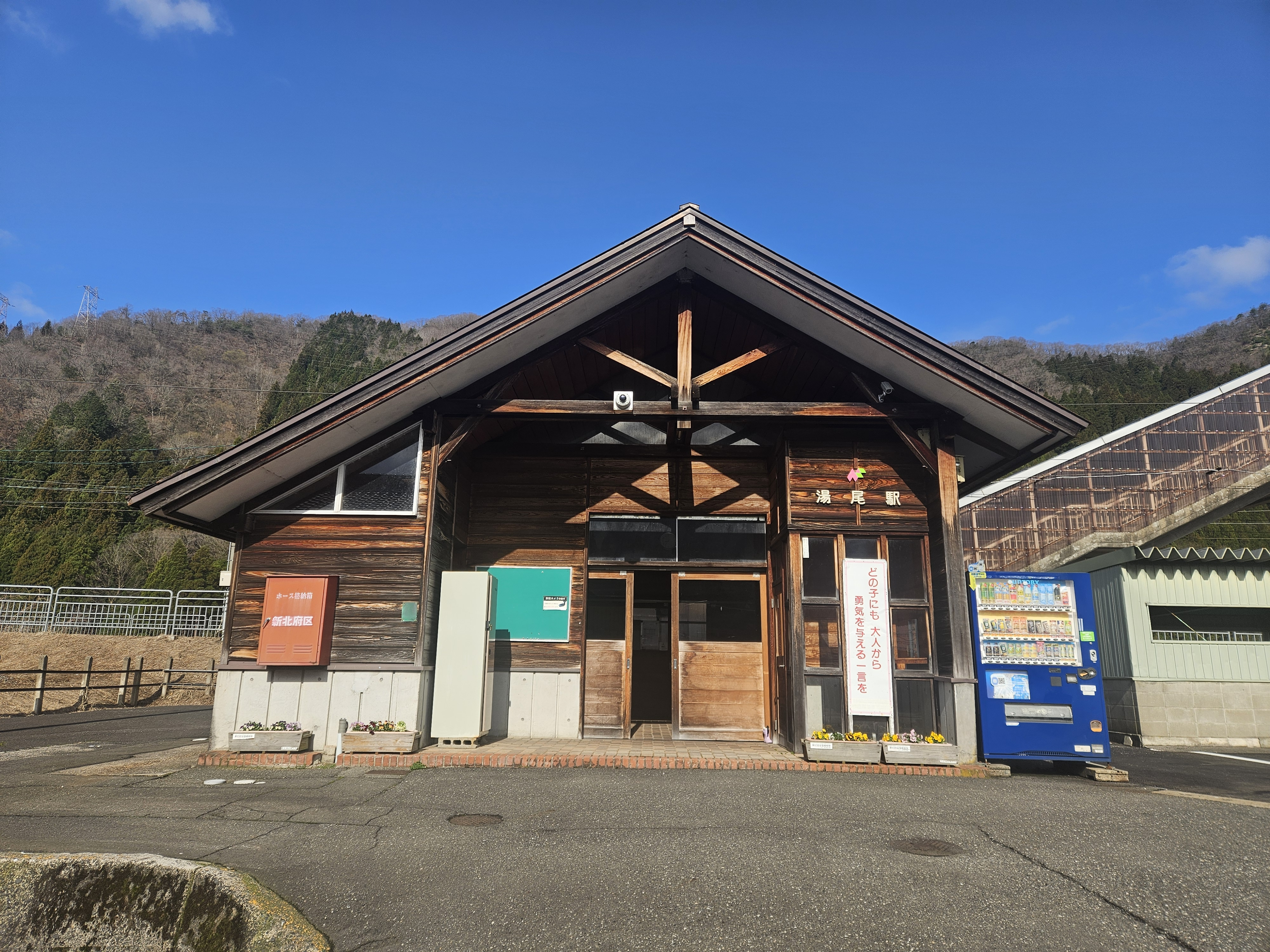
- Yunoo Station in March 2025

General information
- Location: 19-3 Yunoo, Minamiechizen-chō, Nanjō-gun, Fukui-ken 919-0101; Japan
- Coordinates: 35.8033°N 136.1931°E
- Operator: Hapi-Line Fukui
- Line: ■ Hapi-Line Fukui Line
- Distance: 22.8 km from Tsuruga
- Platforms: 2 side platforms
- Tracks: 2

Other information
- Status: Unstaffed
- Website: Official website

History
- Opened: 1 September 1948

Passengers
- FY2016: 97 daily

Services
Preceding station	Hapi-Line Fukui	Following station
Imajō towards Tsuruga	Hapi-Line Fukui Line Local	Nanjō towards Daishōji
Location
- Location within Japan

Yunoo Station (湯尾駅, Yunoo-eki) is a railway station on the Hapi-Line Fukui Line in the town of Minamiechizen, Fukui Prefecture, Japan, operated by the Hapi-Line Fukui.

== Lines ==
Yunoo Station is served by the Hapi-Line Fukui Line, and is located 22.8 kilometers from the terminus of the line at Tsuruga.

== Station layout ==
The station consists of two opposed side platforms connected by a footbridge to a log cabin-style station building. The station is unattended.

=== Platforms ===
1	■ Hapi-Line Fukui Line	for Tsuruga and Maibara
2	■ Hapi-Line Fukui Line	for Fukui and Kanazawa

== History ==
Yunoo Station opened on 1 September 1948. With the privatization of Japanese National Railways (JNR) on 1 April 1987, the station came under the control of JR West.

From the start of the revised timetable on 16 March 2024, this station was transferred to the Hapi-Line Fukui Line due to the opening of the western extension of the Hokuriku Shinkansen from Kanazawa to Tsuruga.

== Passenger statistics ==
In fiscal 2016, the station was used by an average of 97 passengers daily (boarding passengers only).

== Surrounding area ==
- Yunoo Pass
- National Route 305
- National Route 365

== See also ==
- List of railway stations in Japan
