= Somayama Castle =

Kamakura period castle in Honshu, Japan

- 杣山城
- Minamiechizen, Fukui Prefecture, Japan
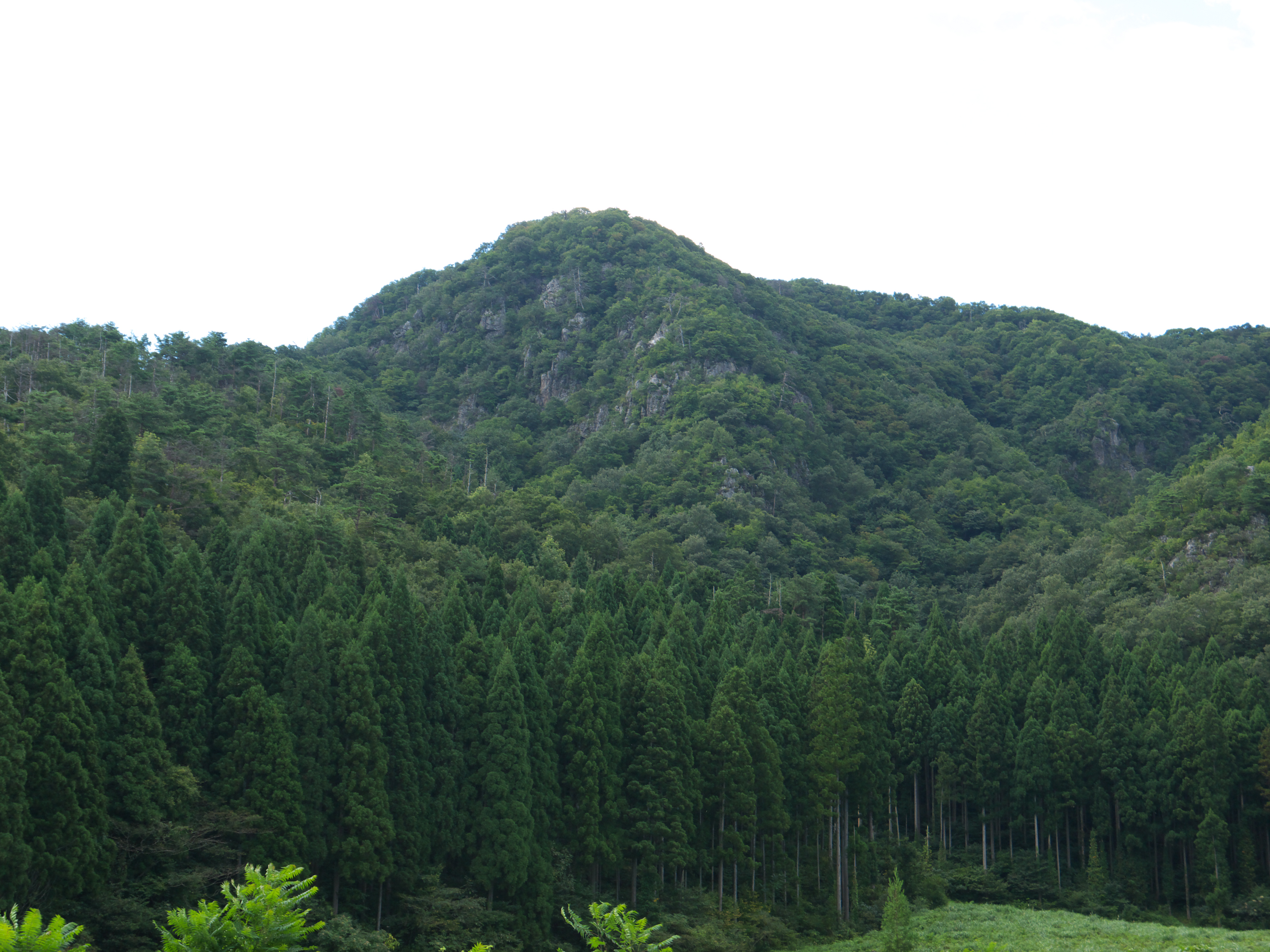
- Mount Somayama

Site information
- Type: yamashiro-style Japanese castle
- Open to the public: yes
- Condition: ruins

Location
- Somayama Castle Somayama Castle (Japan)
- Coordinates: 35°48′8.37″N 136°13′10.14″E

Site history
- Built: Kamakura period
- Built by: Minamoto no Yorichika
- In use: Nanboku-chō period
- Demolished: unknown

Somayama Castle (杣山城, Somayama-jō) was a Kamakura period yamashiro-style Japanese castle located in the town of Nanjō (now part of the town of Minamiechizen), Fukui Prefecture in the Hokuriku region of Honshu, Japan. The ruins have been protected as a National Historic Site since 1934, with the area under protection expanded in 1979.

== Overview ==
Mount Somayama is a hill with a height of 492 meters, located near the geographic center of Minamiechzen town at the southern end of the Nanjō Basin, where the Nanjō Mountains approach the narrow valley of the Hino River. This is a natural chokepoint for traffic on the Hokuriku Kaidō, the ancient highway connecting Echizen Province with Kyoto. The steep sides of Mount Somayama form a natural defensive position, and the castle is surrounded on three sides by the Hino River and its tributaries. The castle had its main enclosure at the base of the hillside, with the inner bailey at the summit.

The origins of the castle are uncertain, but there is a local legend that was first fortified in the late Heian period by Minamoto no Yorichika (966-1057). During the mid-Kamakura period, it came under the control of the Uryū clan. During the early Nanboku-chō period, the Uryū clan was loyal to Emperor Go-Daigo, and the castle became the main stronghold of the Southern Court in Echizen Province.

During the Siege of Kanegasaki, forces loyal to Nitta Yoshisada were trapped for three months at Kanegasaki Castle by Ashikaga Takauji, Nitta's ally Uryū Tamotsu was forced back to the Somayama Castle in March 1337, and Nitta Yoshisada along with his brother Nitta Yoshisuke joined him soon afterwards. A failed counter-attack from Somayama Castle failed to lift the siege against Kanegasaki, and after the death of Nitta Yoshisada, the castle fell. Subsequently, Somayama Castle came under attack by Ashikaga forces, and Masuzawa Yutoku, a retainer of Shiba Takatsune captured the castle for the Northern Court.

Somayama Castle came under the control of the Asakura clan following the defeat of the Shiba clan in 1470 and from 1514, it served as a base of operations against the Ikkō-ikki rebellion against the Asakura in Echizen Province. Oda Nobunaga destroyed the Asakura, and the Ikkō-ikki rose again, but were swiftly annihilated. The castle was abandoned sometime thereafter.

The site was excavated from 1975 to 1980, revealing the remnants of moats, earthen ramparts and the foundations for a large building, along with numerous pottery shards. About 170 hectares of Somayama Castle, where the mountain castle is located, and a part of the castle at the foot of the mountain, were designated as national historic sites in 1934 and 1979. The site is open to the public as a park with several hiking courses maintained by the Minamiechizen town government. It can be reached by taxi from Nanjō Station on the JR West Hokuriku Main Line.

== See also ==
- List of Historic Sites of Japan (Fukui)
