= Minamiechizen, Fukui =

Minamiechizen 南越前町
- Town
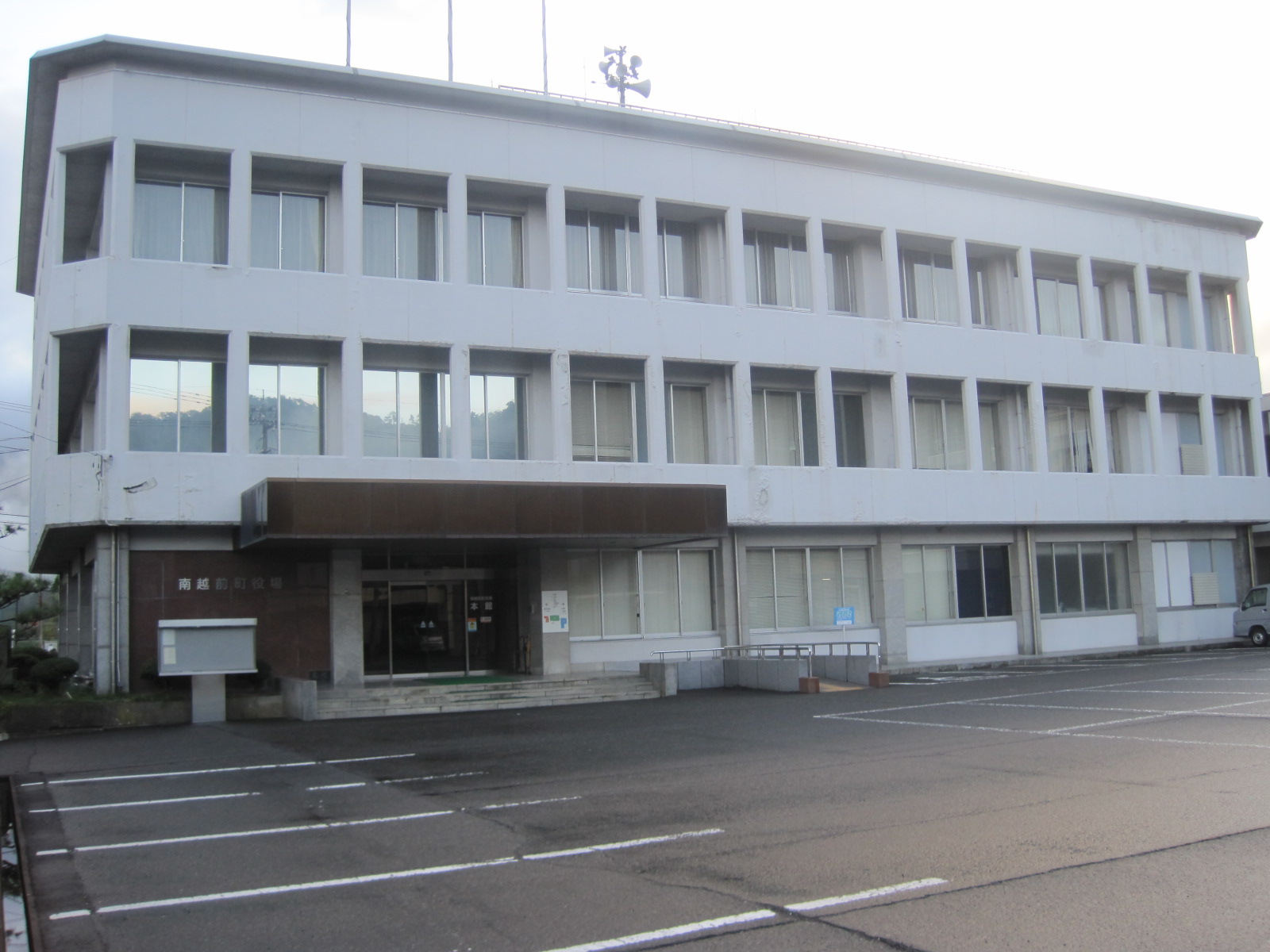
- Minamiechizen Town Hall

- Flag Seal

- Location of Minamiechizen in Fukui Prefecture

- Coordinates: 35°50′6.3″N 136°11′40″E
- Country: Japan
- Region: Chūbu (Hokuriku)
- Prefecture: Fukui
- District: Nanjō

Area
  - Total: 343.69 km^{2} (132.70 sq mi)

Population (March 1, 2026)
  - Total: 9,188
  - Density: 26.73/km^{2} (69.24/sq mi)
- Time zone: UTC+9 (Japan Standard Time)
- Phone number: 0778-47-3000
- Address: Minamiechizen-chō, Nanjō-gun, Fukui-ken 919-0292
- Climate: Cfa
- Website: www.town.minamiechizen.lg.jp
- Symbols

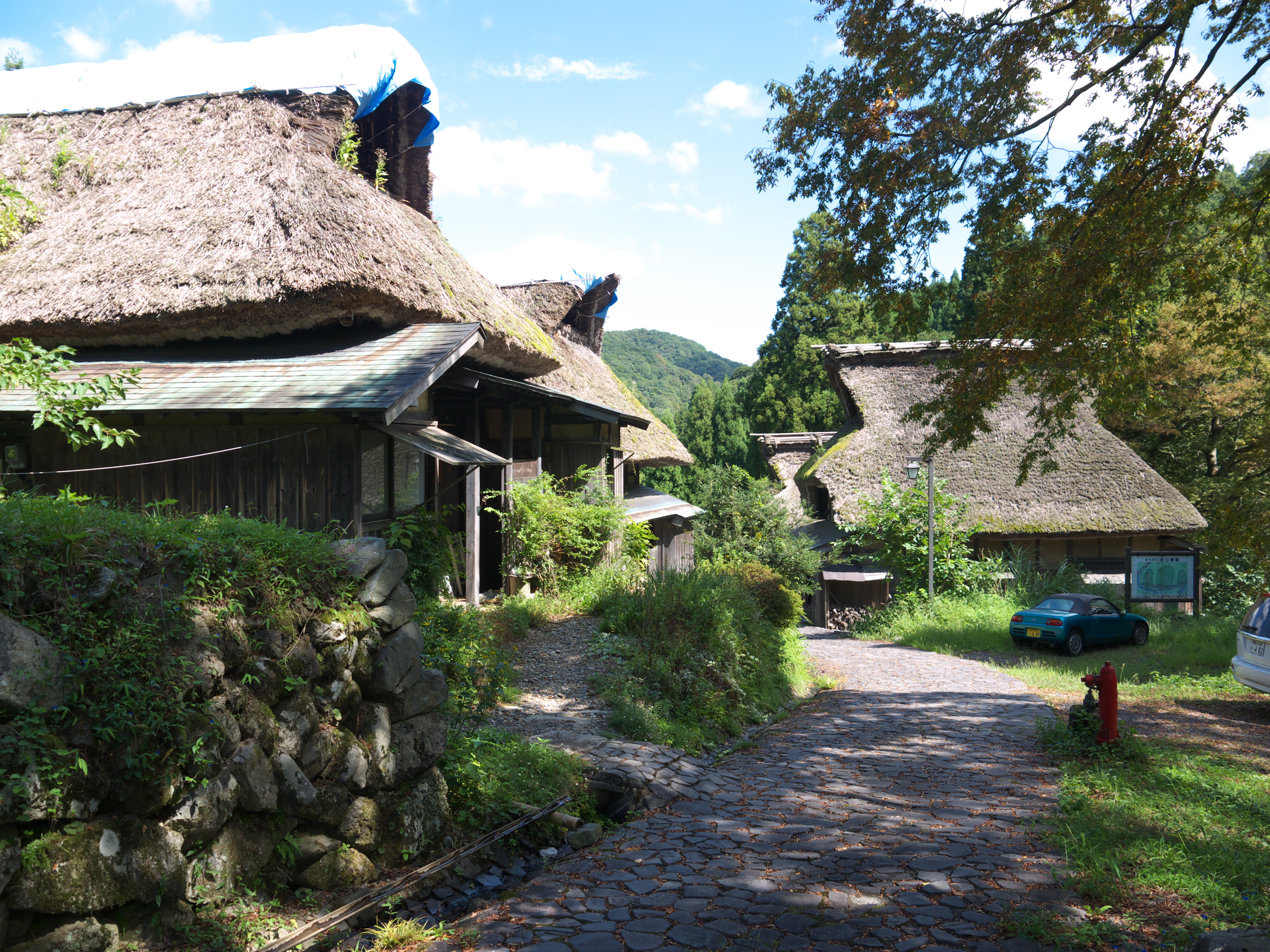
The old shukuba of Itadori, one of the "100 secluded villages in Japan"

Minamiechizen (南越前町, Minamiechizen-chō) is a town located in Fukui Prefecture, Japan. As of 1 March 2026, the town had an estimated population of 9,188 in 3,304 households and a population density of 27 persons per km^{2}. The total area of the town was 343.68 square kilometres (132.70 sq mi).

== Geography ==
Minamiechizen is located in central Fukui Prefecture at the southern end of the Reihoku region, bordered by Gifu Prefecture to the west, Shiga Prefecture to the south and the Sea of Japan to the west. Located almost in the center of Fukui Prefecture, it is a vital transportation hub connecting the Kinki region and various parts of the Hokuriku region north of the town. Although the three former towns which constitute Minamiechizen bordered each other, before Japan National Route 305 was fully completed in 2013, the Kono district, facing Wakasa Bay, lacked a direct road connection to the inland Nanjo and Imajo districts, where the town hall was located, effectively making it an exclave. Parts of the coastal area of the town are within the borders of the Echizen-Kaga Kaigan Quasi-National Park.

=== Neighbouring municipalities ===
Gifu Prefecture

- Ibigawa

Fukui Prefecture

- Echizen
- Echizen (town)
- Ikeda
- Tsuruga

Shiga Prefecture

- Nagahama

=== Climate ===
Minamiechizen has a humid subtropical climate (Cfa per the Köppen climate classification system), characterized by warm, wet summers and cold winters with heavy snowfall. The average annual temperature in Minamiechizen is 13.1 °C (55.6 °F). The average annual rainfall is 2,608.2 mm (102.69 in) with December as the wettest month. The temperatures are highest on average in August, at around 25.4 °C (77.7 °F), and lowest in January, at around 1.7 °C (35.1 °F). Parts of the town are located within the extremely heavy snowfall area of Japan.

Climate data for Imajō, Minamiechizen (1991−2020 normals, extremes 1978−present)
Month	Jan	Feb	Mar	Apr	May	Jun	Jul	Aug	Sep	Oct	Nov	Dec	Year
Record high °C (°F)	17.9 (64.2)	18.5 (65.3)	23.5 (74.3)	30.3 (86.5)	33.0 (91.4)	33.9 (93.0)	36.8 (98.2)	36.9 (98.4)	35.6 (96.1)	30.7 (87.3)	25.4 (77.7)	22.5 (72.5)	36.9 (98.4)
Mean daily maximum °C (°F)	5.4 (41.7)	6.2 (43.2)	10.9 (51.6)	17.5 (63.5)	22.5 (72.5)	25.7 (78.3)	29.4 (84.9)	31.1 (88.0)	26.6 (79.9)	20.9 (69.6)	15.0 (59.0)	8.5 (47.3)	18.3 (65.0)
Daily mean °C (°F)	1.7 (35.1)	1.9 (35.4)	5.4 (41.7)	11.3 (52.3)	16.4 (61.5)	20.4 (68.7)	24.4 (75.9)	25.4 (77.7)	21.2 (70.2)	15.3 (59.5)	9.6 (49.3)	4.3 (39.7)	13.1 (55.6)
Mean daily minimum °C (°F)	−1.0 (30.2)	−1.4 (29.5)	0.7 (33.3)	5.4 (41.7)	10.7 (51.3)	15.9 (60.6)	20.5 (68.9)	21.2 (70.2)	17.2 (63.0)	10.9 (51.6)	5.2 (41.4)	1.0 (33.8)	8.9 (48.0)
Record low °C (°F)	−11.8 (10.8)	−12.0 (10.4)	−8.2 (17.2)	−3.3 (26.1)	0.4 (32.7)	6.0 (42.8)	12.2 (54.0)	11.5 (52.7)	6.1 (43.0)	0.5 (32.9)	−2.1 (28.2)	−6.7 (19.9)	−12.0 (10.4)
Average precipitation mm (inches)	317.9 (12.52)	187.1 (7.37)	177.5 (6.99)	145.8 (5.74)	151.8 (5.98)	173.8 (6.84)	254.9 (10.04)	182.0 (7.17)	224.5 (8.84)	182.7 (7.19)	229.9 (9.05)	380.4 (14.98)	2,608.2 (102.69)
Average snowfall cm (inches)	177 (70)	143 (56)	43 (17)	0 (0)	0 (0)	0 (0)	0 (0)	0 (0)	0 (0)	0 (0)	1 (0.4)	79 (31)	442 (174)
Average precipitation days (≥ 1.0 mm)	22.1	17.6	15.7	13.1	11.6	12.7	13.5	10.6	12.5	12.6	15.7	21.6	179.3
Average snowy days (≥ 3 cm)	15.9	14.6	4.8	0	0	0	0	0	0	0	0.1	7.4	42.8
Mean monthly sunshine hours	54.9	75.7	121.7	167.8	192.8	140.8	149.3	191.0	135.9	135.7	105.7	65.7	1,526.6
Source: Japan Meteorological Agency

== Demographics ==
Per Japanese census data, the population of Minamiechizen has declined over the past 50 years.

Historical population
Year	Pop.	±%
1970	14,442	—
1980	13,820	−4.3%
1990	13,804	−0.1%
2000	13,221	−4.2%
2010	11,551	−12.6%
2020	10,002	−13.4%

== History ==
Minamiechizen is part of ancient Echizen Province. During the Edo period, the area was mostly part of the holdings of Fukui Domain and Nishio Domain under the Tokugawa shogunate. Following the Meiji restoration, and the establishment of the modern municipalities it was organised into part of Nanjō District in Fukui Prefecture. Minamiechizen was formed on 1 January 2005, by the merger of the two former towns of Imajō and Nanjō, and the former village of Kōno (all from Nanjō District).

Minamiechizen has a mayor-council form of government with a directly elected mayor and a unicameral town legislature of 12 members. Minamiechizen, collectively with the city of Echizen and town of Ikeda contributes five members to the Fukui Prefectural Assembly. In terms of national politics, the town is part of the Fukui 2nd district of the lower house of the Diet of Japan.

== Economy ==
The economy of Minamiechizen is mixed, with agriculture and commercial fishing prominent.

== Education ==
Minamiechizen has four public elementary schools and there middle schools operated by the city government. The town does not have public high school.

== Transportation ==
=== Railway ===
JR West surrendered ownership of the Hokuriku Main Line in Minamiechizen to third-sector company Hapi-line Fukui on 16 March 2024. Hapi-line Fukui

- Minami-Imajō, Imajō, Yunoo, Nanjō

=== Highway ===
- Hokuriku Expressway
- National Route 8
- National Route 305
- National Route 365
- National Route 417
- National Route 476

== Local attractions ==
- Echizen-Kaga Kaigan Quasi-National Park
- Somayama Castle, National Historic Site
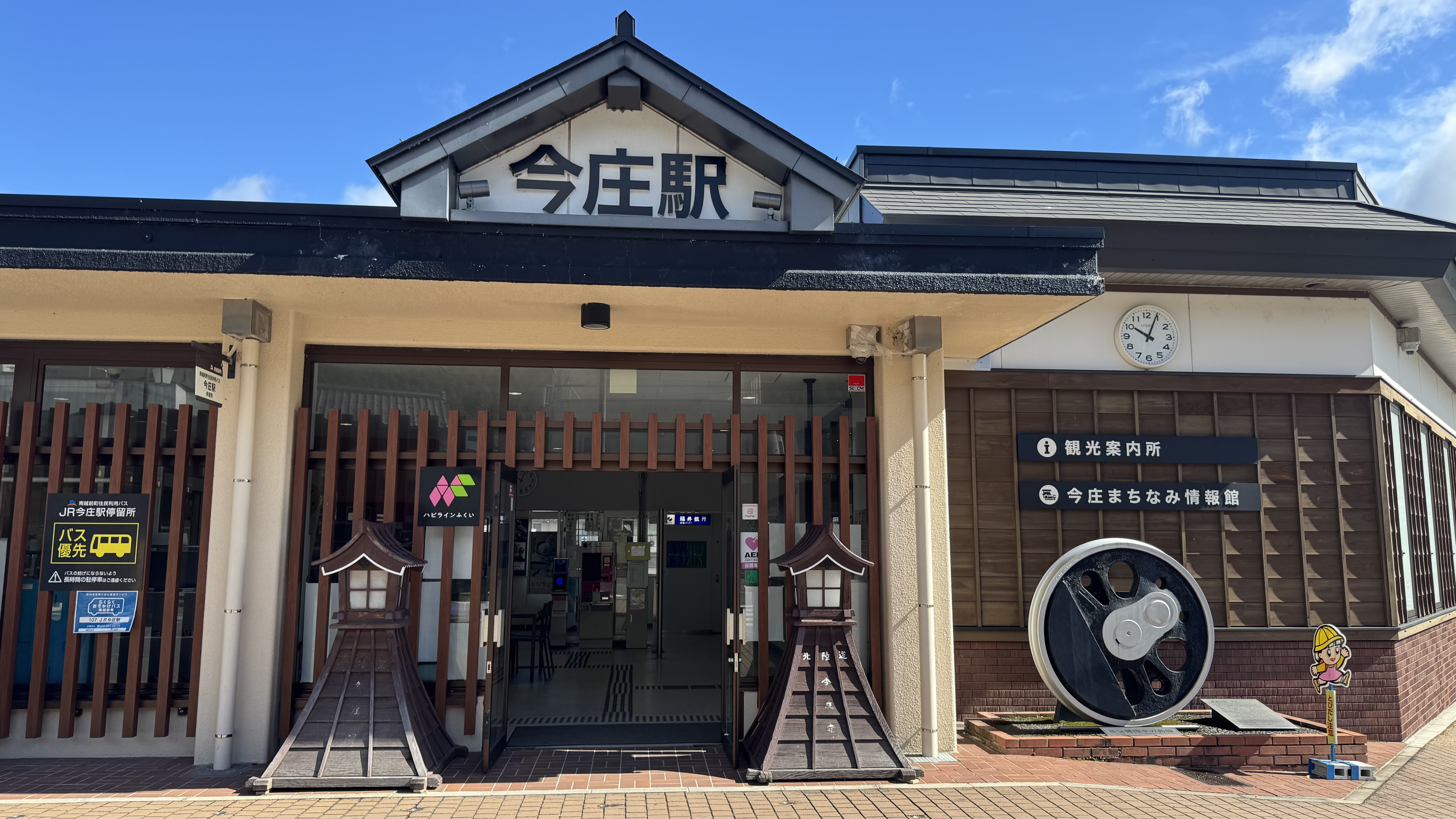
Imajo Station

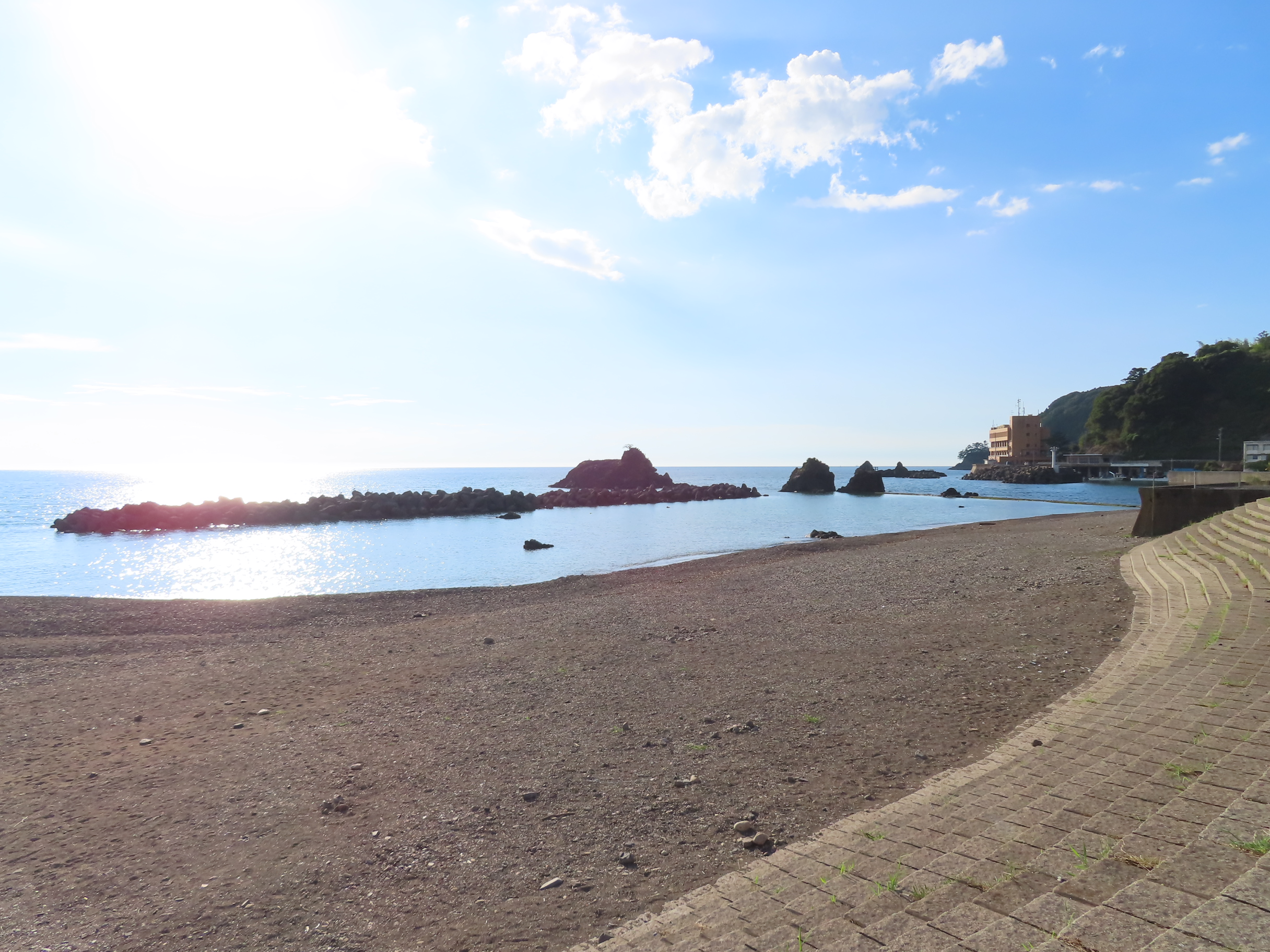
Kono beach

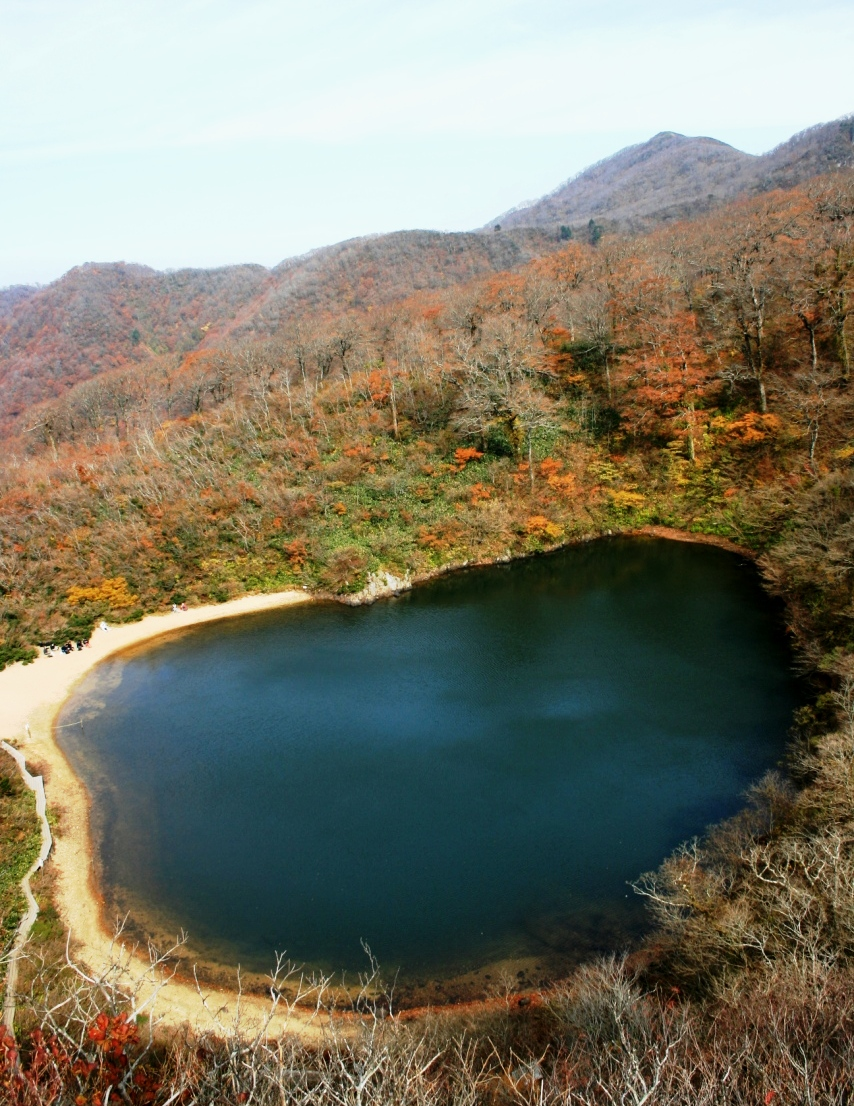
Yasyagaike

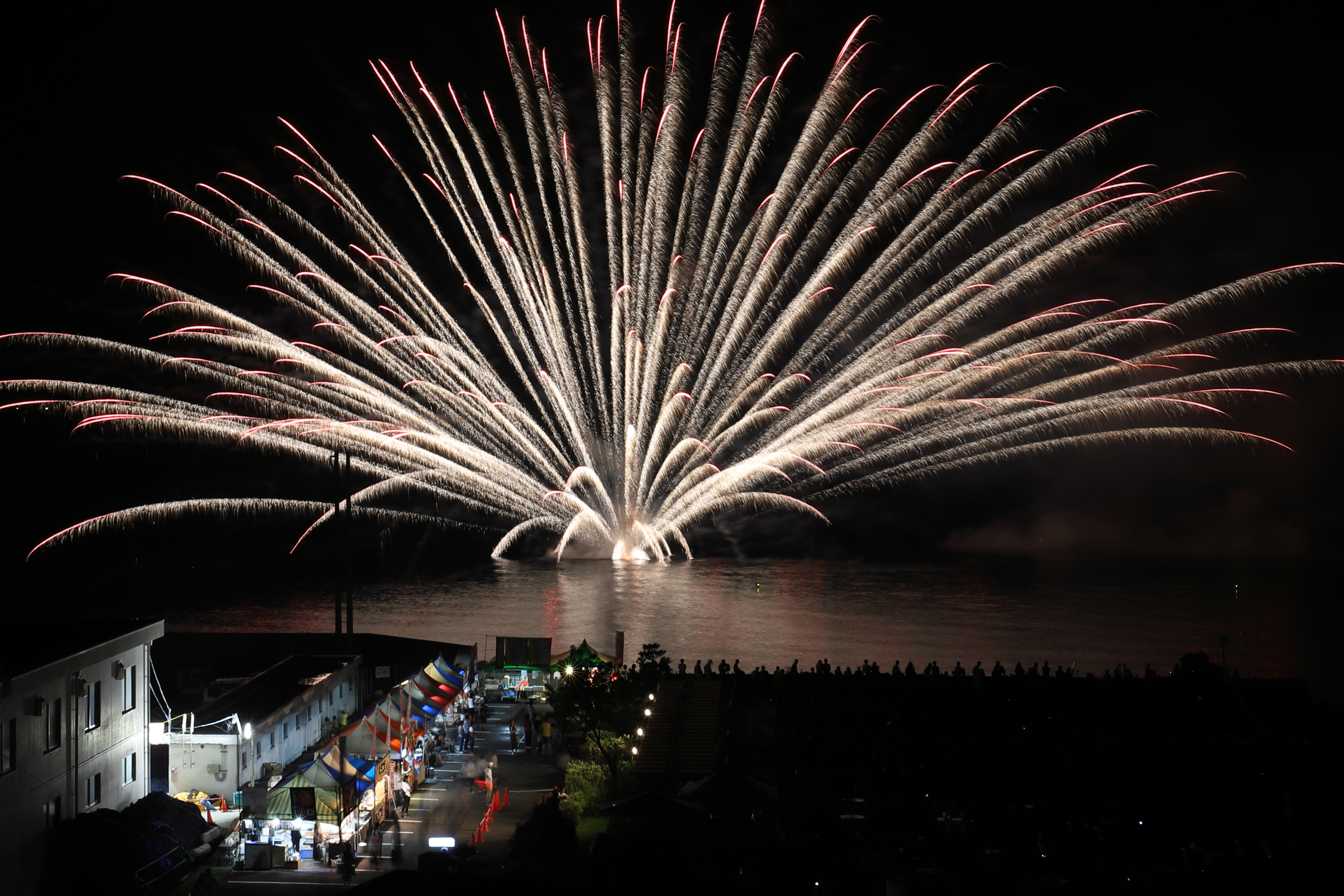
Kono summer fireworks
