= Abaran =

Abaran may refer to the following places :

- Abarán, Spain
- Aparan, Armenia, formerly seat of the bishopric of Nakchivan

== See also ==
- Avaran (disambiguation)
