= Takefu Station =

Railway station in Echizen, Fukui Prefecture, Japan

Takefu Station 武生駅
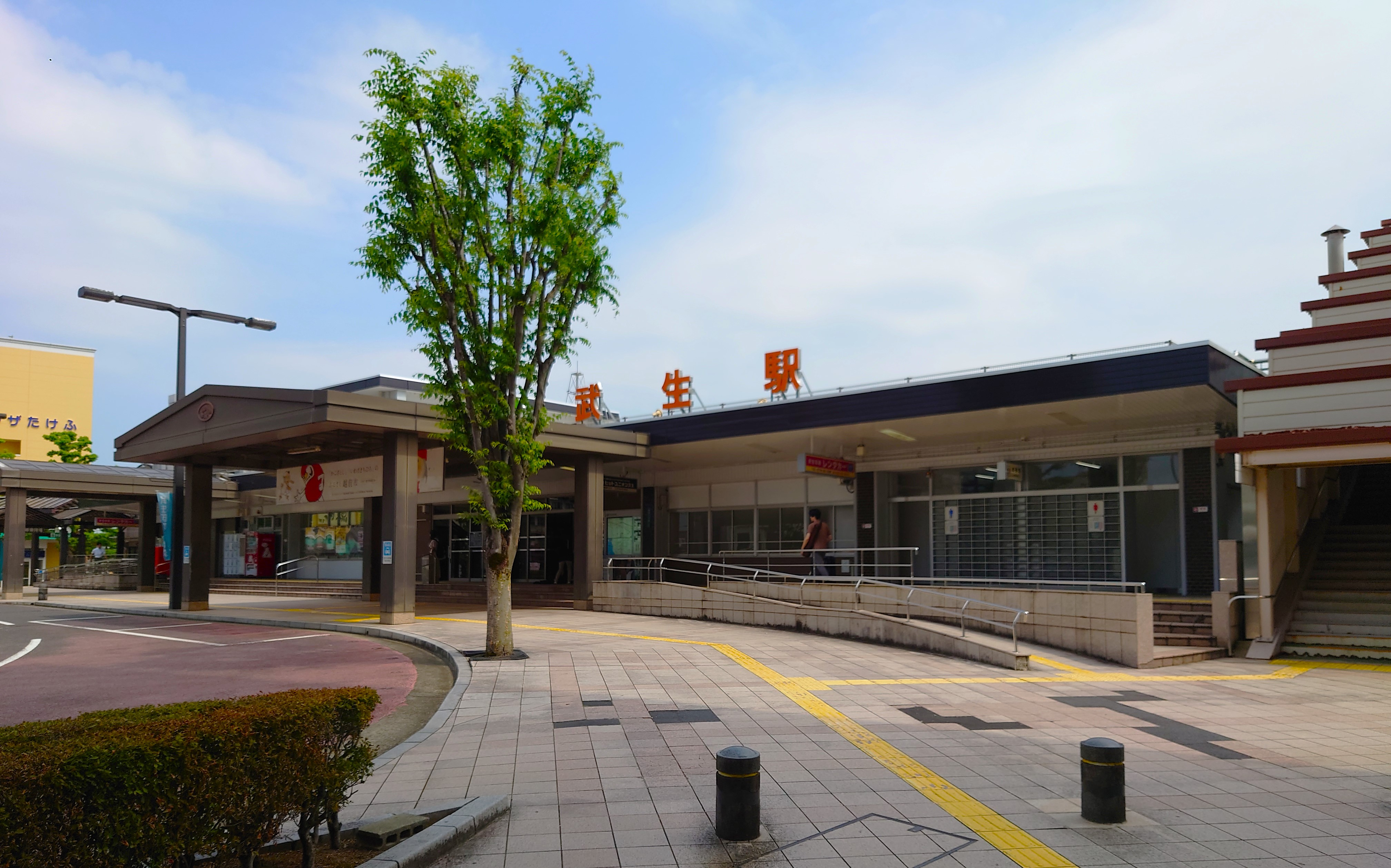
- Takefu Station in September 2024

General information
- Location: 1-1 Fuchu, Echizen-shi, Fukui-ken 915-0071; Japan
- Coordinates: 35.903321°N 136.170816°E
- Operator: Hapi-Line Fukui
- Line: Hapi-Line Fukui Line
- Distance: 35.1 km from Tsuruga
- Platforms: 1 side + 1 island platforms
- Tracks: 3

Construction
- Structure type: Ground level
- Accessible: Yes

Other information
- Status: Staffed (Midori no Madoguchi)
- Website: Official website

History
- Opened: 15 July 1896

Passengers
- FY2016: 2344 daily

Services
Preceding station	Hapi-Line Fukui	Following station
Imajō One-way operation	Hapi-Line Fukui Line Rapid	Sabae towards Fukui
Nanjō One-way operation	Hapi-Line Fukui Line Rapid	Sabae towards Fukui
Shikibu towards Tsuruga	Hapi-Line Fukui Line Rapid Regional Rapid	Sabae towards Fukui
Shikibu towards Tsuruga	Hapi-Line Fukui Line Local	Sabae towards Daishōji
Location
- Location within Japan

Takefu Station (武生駅, Takefu-eki) is a railway station on the Hapi-Line Fukui Line in the city of Echizen, Fukui, Japan, operated by Hapi-Line Fukui.

== Lines ==
Takefu Station is served by the Hapi-Line Fukui Line, and is located 35.1 kilometers from the terminus of the line at Tsuruga.

== Station layout ==
The station consists of one side platform and one island platform serving three tracks. The station building is located on the south side of the tracks. The station has a "Midori no Madoguchi" staffed ticket office.

=== Platforms ===
1	■ Hapi-Line Fukui Line	for Fukui and Kanazawa
2-3	■ Hapi-Line Fukui Line	for Tsuruga and Maibara

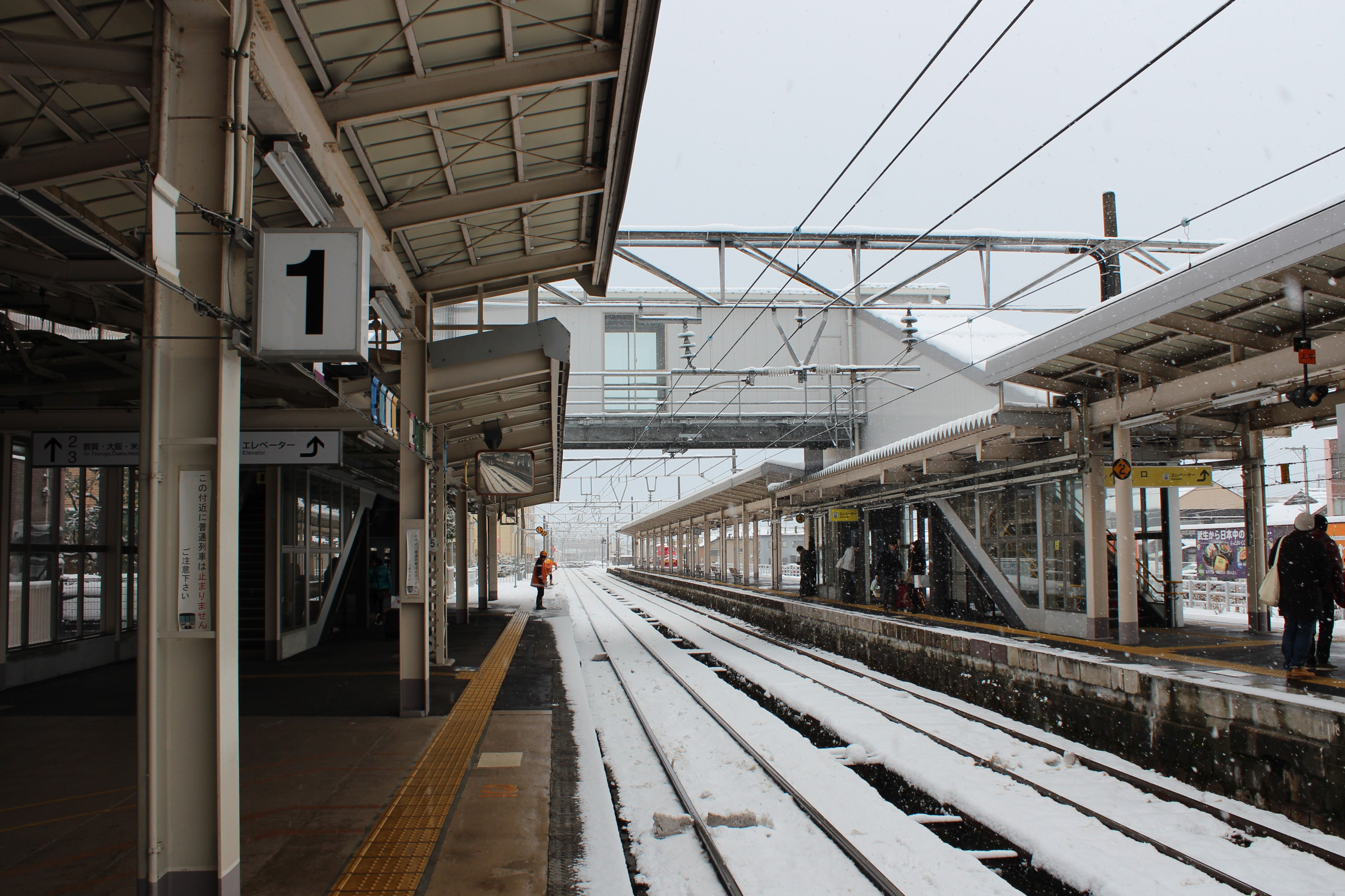
The platforms in January 2013

== History ==
Takefu Station opened on 15 July 1896. With the privatization of Japanese National Railways (JNR) on 1 April 1987, the station came under the control of JR West.

From the start of the revised timetable on 16 March 2024, this station was transferred to the Hapi-Line Fukui Line due to the opening of the western extension of the Hokuriku Shinkansen from Kanazawa to Tsuruga.

== Passenger statistics ==
In fiscal 2016, the station was used by an average of 2,344 passengers daily (boarding passengers only).

== Surrounding area ==
- Fukui Prefectural Takefu High School
- Murasaki Shikibu park
- Echizen Tamagawa Onsen
- Takefu-Shin Station (Fukui Railway Fukubu Line)

== See also ==
- List of railway stations in Japan
