= Avaran, Qusar =

Avaran
- Municipality
- Location within Azerbaijan
- Coordinates: 41°25′52″N 48°23′22″E
- Country: Azerbaijan
- Rayon: Qusar

Population
  - Total: 1,341
- Time zone: UTC+4 (AZT)
  - Summer (DST): UTC+5 (AZT)

Avaran is a village and municipality in the Qusar Rayon of Azerbaijan. It has a population of 1,341.
