= Nanjō Station =

Railway station in Minamiechizen, Fukui Prefecture, Japan

Nanjō Station 南条駅
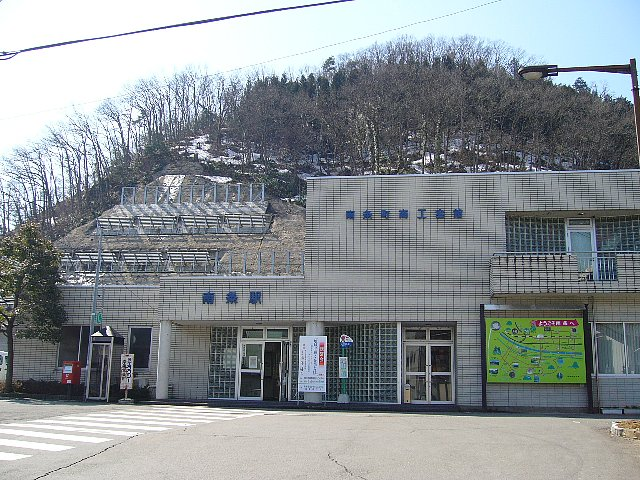
- Nanjō Station in March 2006

General information
- Location: 19-42 Nishidaidō, Minamiechizen-chō, Nanjō-gun, Fukui-ken 919-0224; Japan
- Coordinates: 35.8321°N 136.1935°E
- Operator: Hapi-Line Fukui
- Line: ■ Hapi-Line Fukui Line
- Distance: 26.3 km from Tsuruga
- Platforms: 2 side platforms
- Tracks: 2

Other information
- Status: Staffed
- Website: Official website

History
- Opened: 15 July 1896
- Former names: Sabanami (to 1973)

Passengers
- FY2016: 348 daily
Location
- Location within Japan

Nanjō Station (南条駅, Nanjō-eki) is a railway station on the Hapi-Line Fukui Line in the town of Minamiechizen, Fukui Prefecture, Japan, operated by the Hapi-Line Fukui, a Japanese railway company.

== Lines ==
Nanjō Station is served by the Hapi-Line Fukui Line, and is located 26.3 kilometers from the terminus of the line at Tsuruga.

== Station layout ==
The station consists of two unnumbered opposed side platforms connected by an underground passage. The station is staffed.

=== Platforms ===
station side	■ Hapi-Line Fukui Line	for Tsuruga and Maibara
opposite side	■ Hapi-Line Fukui Line	for Fukui and Kanazawa

== Adjacent stations ==
«	Service	»
Hapi-Line Fukui Line
Tsuruga	Rapid	Takefu
Yunoo	Local	Ōshio

== History ==
Nanjō Station opened on 15 July 1896 as Sabanami Station (鯖波駅). It was renamed to its present name on 1 April 1973. With the privatization of Japanese National Railways (JNR) on 1 April 1987, the station came under the control of JR West.

Effective the 16 March 2024 timetable revision, this station was transferred to the Hapi-Line Fukui Line due to the opening of the western extension of the Hokuriku Shinkansen from Kanazawa to Tsuruga.

== Passenger statistics ==
In fiscal 2016, the station was used by an average of 348 passengers daily (boarding passengers only).

== Surrounding area ==
- Nanjō Town Hall
- Site of Somayama Castle
- Nanjō Elementary School
- Nanjō Junior High School
- National Route 365

== See also ==
- List of railway stations in Japan
