= Awara, Fukui =

Awara あわら市
- City
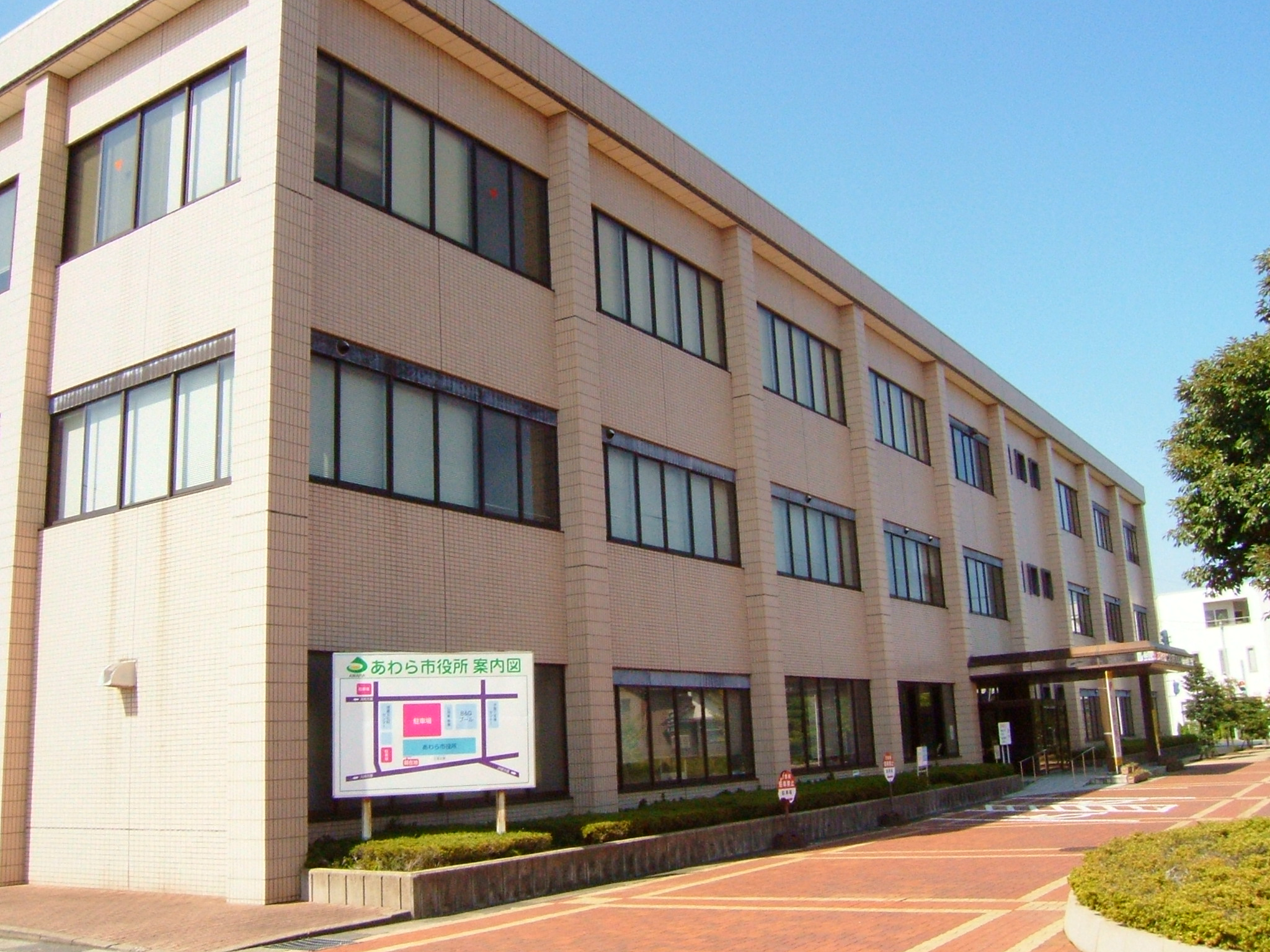
- Awara City Hall

- Flag Seal

- Location of Awara in Fukui Prefecture

- Coordinates: 36°12′40.7″N 136°13′44.3″E
- Country: Japan
- Region: Chūbu (Hokuriku)
- Prefecture: Fukui

Area
  - Total: 116.98 km^{2} (45.17 sq mi)

Population (December 9, 2025)
  - Total: 26,024
  - Density: 222.47/km^{2} (576.18/sq mi)
- Time zone: UTC+9 (Japan Standard Time)
- Phone number: 0776-73-1221
- Address: 2-1-1, Ichihime, Awara-shi, Fukui-ken 919-0692
- Website: Official website
- Symbols
- Bird: Egret
- Flower: Iris
- Tree: Prunus mume

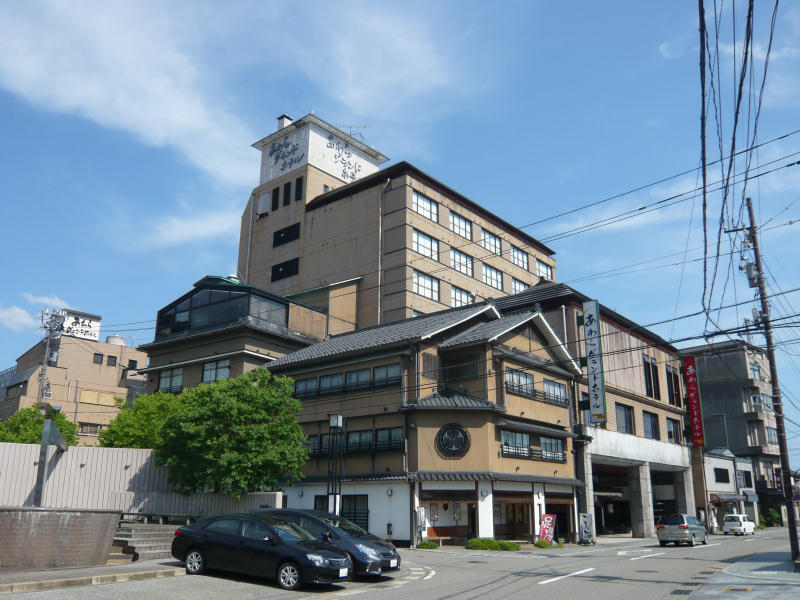
Awara Onsen

Awara (あわら市, Awara-shi; Japanese pronunciation: [ä̀.β̞ä́.ɾä́(.ɕì)]) is a city located in Fukui Prefecture, Japan. As of 9 December 2025, the city had an estimated population of 26,024 in 10,571 households and the population density of 222 persons per km^{2}. The total area of the city was 116.98 square kilometres (45.17 sq mi). It is one of the few "hiragana cities" in Japan. Awara is a city famous for its onsen resorts and natural hotwater springs.

== Geography ==
Awara is the northernmost municipality in Fukui Prefecture, and is bordered by Ishikawa Prefecture to the north and the Sea of Japan to the northeast, The city of Sakai surrounds the city to the east, south and west. The northern portionof the city is on the slightly elevated Kaetsu Plateau, the southern part of the Fukui Plain, and the eastern portion which contains Mount Kariyasu. The city consists of two urban areas: the Kanazu district, which has its roots as a post town that served as the northern gateway to Echizen on the ancient Hokurikudō highway and developed as a river port for shipping along the Takeda River since before the Muromachi period, and the Awara district, which flourished as a hot spring town with the emergence of Awara Hot Springs during the Meiji period.

=== Neighbouring municipalities ===
Fukui Prefecture

- Sakai

Ishikawa Prefecture

- Kaga

== Climate ==
Awara has a Humid climate per the Köppen climate classification system, characterized by warm, wet summers and cold winters with heavy snowfall. The average annual temperature in Awara is 14.2 °C. The average annual rainfall is 2481 mm with September as the wettest month. The temperatures are highest on average in August, at around 26.8 °C, and lowest in January, at around 2.8 °C.

== Demographics ==
Per Japanese census data, the population of Awara peaked around the year 2000 and has declined since.

Historical population
Year	Pop.	±%
1970	29,436	—
1980	30,975	+5.2%
1990	31,743	+2.5%
2000	32,178	+1.4%
2010	29,989	−6.8%
2020	27,524	−8.2%

== History ==
Awara is part of ancient Echizen Province. During the Edo period, the area was divided between the holdings of Fukui Domain, Maruoka Domain and Nishio Domain. Following the Meiji restoration, it was organised into part of Sakai District in Fukui Prefecture. Awara Onsen was developed from June 1884. With the establishment of the modern municipalities system on April 1, 1889, the town of Kanazu and villages of Awara, Ii, Tsuboe, Hosorogi, Yoshizaki, Kitagata and Honjō were established. Awara was raised to town status in February 1935. The villages of Ii, Tsuboe, Hosoroe, and Yoshizaki merged into Kanazu in October 1954, and Kitagata and Honsho were merged into Awara in March 1955. Most of Awara Onsen burned down in a fire in April 1956. Awara and Kanazu merged to form the city of Awara on March 1, 2004.

== Government ==
Awara has a mayor-council form of government with a directly elected mayor and a unicameral city legislature of 16 members. Arawa contributes one member to the Fukui Prefectural Assembly. In terms of national politics, the city is part of the Fukui 1st district of the lower house of the Diet of Japan.

== Economy ==
The economy of Awara is mixed, with agriculture and the tourism industry centered on Awara Onsen playing prominent roles. Hitachi Zosen Fukui Corporation, a hydraulic press manufacturer, is headquartered in Awara.

== Education ==
Awara has seven public elementary schools and two middle schools operated by the city government, and one public high school operated by the Fukui Prefectural Board of Education. The public Fukui Prefectural University and the private Fukui University of Technology both have branch campuses in Awara.

=== High school ===
- Kanazu High School (金津高校)

=== Junior high schools ===
- Awara Junior High School (芦原中学校)
- Kanazu Junior High School (金津中学校)

=== Elementary schools ===
- Awara Elementary School (芦原小学校)
- Honjo Elementary School (本荘小学校)
- Hosorogi Elementary School (細呂木小学校)
- Ii Elementary School (伊井小学校)
- Kanazu Elementary School (金津小学校)
- Kanazu Higashi Elementary School (金津東小学校)
- Kitagata Elementary School 北潟小学校)

== Transportation ==
=== Railway ===
JR West - Hokuriku Shinkansen

- Awaraonsen

Echizen Railway Mikuni Awara Line

- Honjō - Banden - Awara-Yunomachi

Hapi-Line Fukui

- Awaraonsen - Hosorogi - Ushinoya

=== Highway ===
- Hokuriku Expressway, Kanazu IC
- National Route 8
- National Route 305
- National Route 265

== International relations ==
- Shaoxing, Zhejiang, China, friendship city

== Local attractions ==
- Awara Onsen
- Echizen-Kaga Kaigan Quasi-National Park
- site of Yoshizaki-gobō, National Historic Site
- Fujino Genkuro Memorial Hall
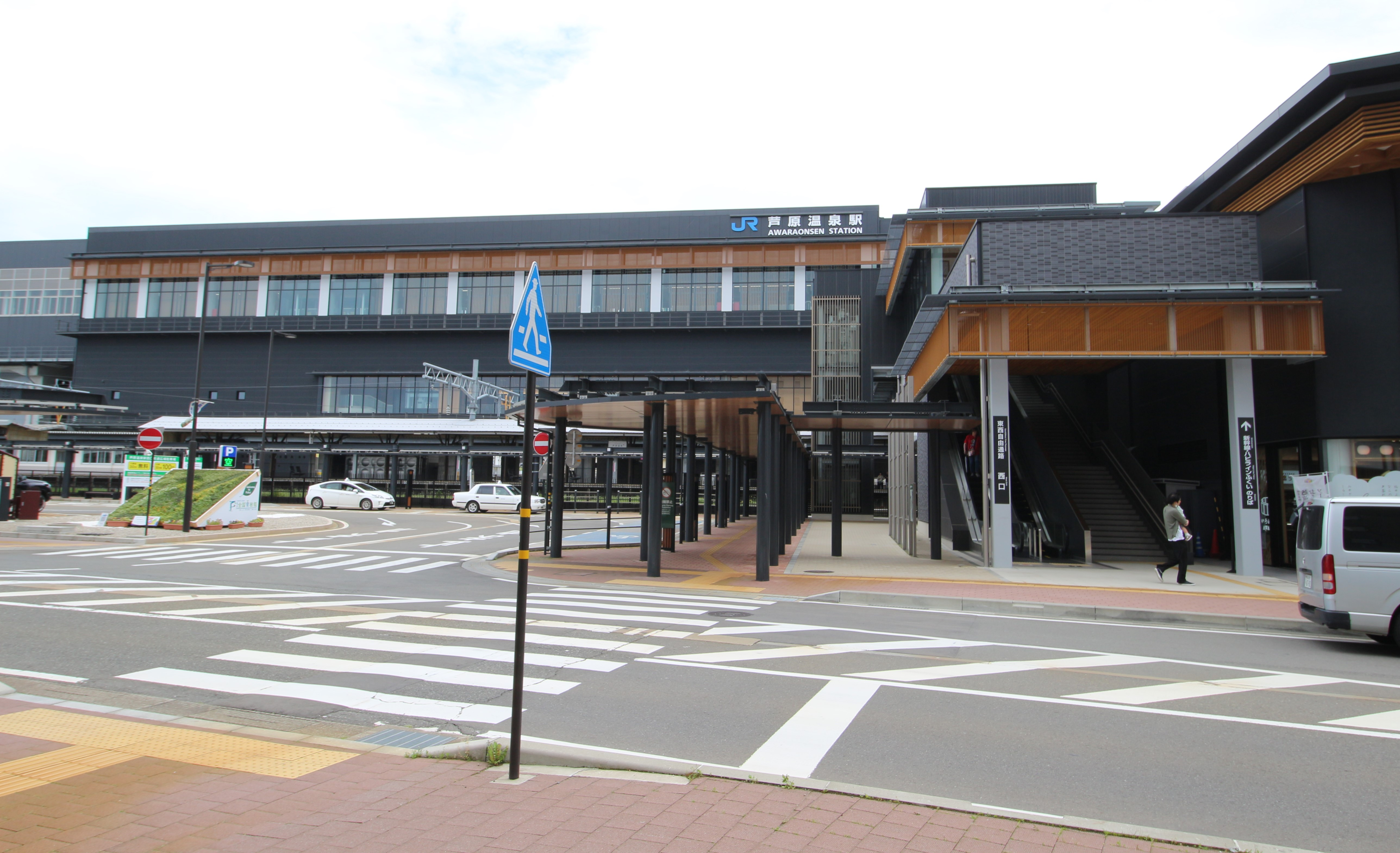
Awaraonsen Station

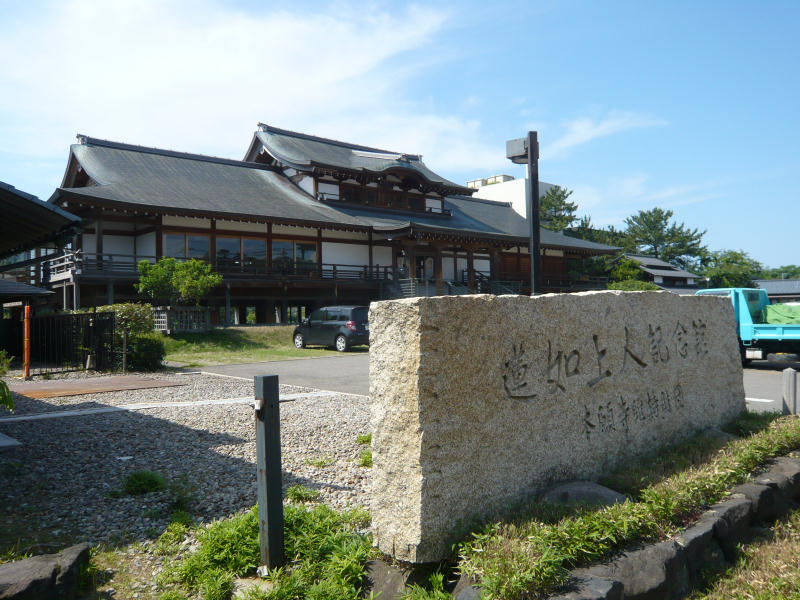
Yoshizaki-gobō

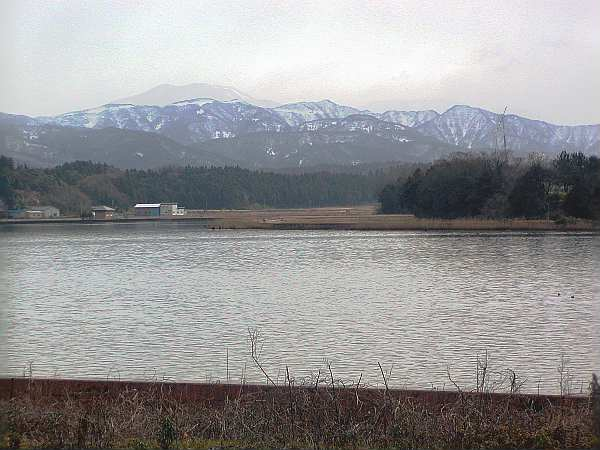
Lake Kitagata

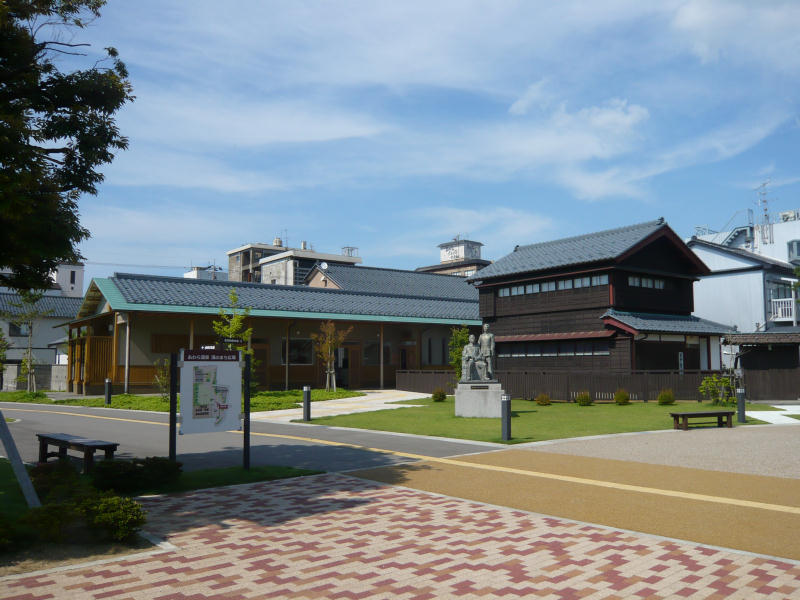
Fujino Genkuro Memorial Hall
