= Kagaonsen Station =

Railway station in Kaga, Ishikawa Prefecture, Japan

Kagaonsen Station 加賀温泉駅
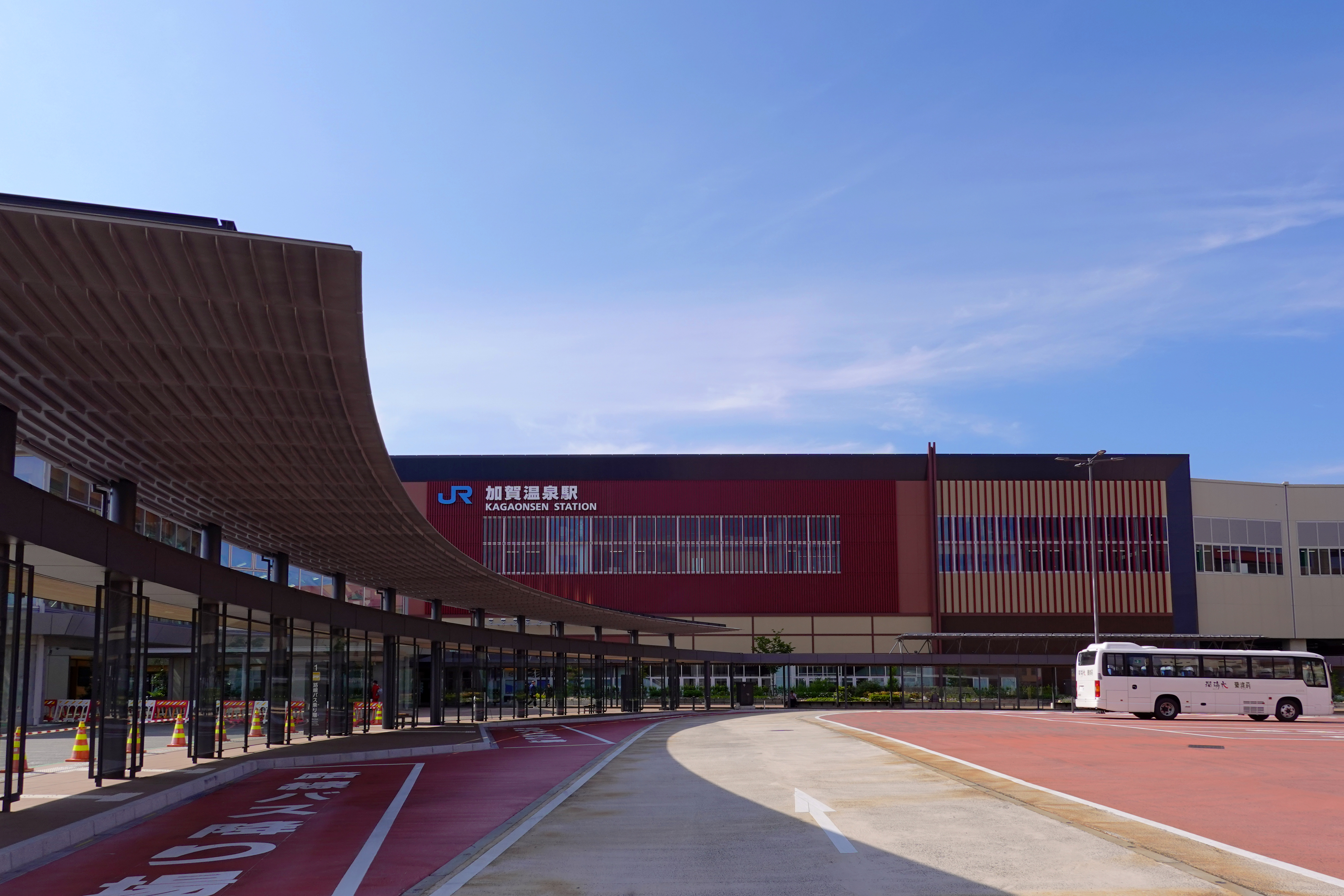
- Kagaonsen Station in June 2026

General information
- Location: 58 Sakumi-machi, Kaga-shi, Ishikawa-ken 922-0423; Japan
- Coordinates: 36.3202471°N 136.3505352°E
- Operator: JR West; IR Ishikawa Railway
- Lines: Hokuriku Shinkansen; IR Ishikawa Railway Line
- Distance: 134.3 km (83.5 mi) from Maibara
- Platforms: 2 island platforms
- Tracks: 4

Construction
- Structure type: Elevated (Shinkansen); At-Grade (IR Ishikawa Railway)
- Accessible: Yes

Other information
- Status: Staffed (Midori no Madoguchi)
- Website: Official website

History
- Opened: 11 October 1944; 82 years ago
- Former names: Sakumi (until 1970)

Passengers
- FY2015: 2229 daily

Services
Preceding station	JR West	Following station
Awara-Onsen towards Tsuruga	Hokuriku Shinkansen Kagayaki	Komatsu towards Nagano
Awara-Onsen towards Tsuruga	Hokuriku Shinkansen Hakutaka	Komatsu towards Jōetsumyōkō
Awara-Onsen towards Tsuruga	Hokuriku Shinkansen Tsurugi	Komatsu towards Toyama
Preceding station	IR Ishikawa Railway	Following station
Daishōji Terminus	IR Ishikawa Railway Line Rapid	Iburihashi towards Kanazawa
Daishōji Terminus	IR Ishikawa Railway Line Local	Iburihashi towards Kurikara
Location
- Location within Ishikawa Prefecture Location within Japan

Kagaonsen Station (加賀温泉駅, Kagaonsen-eki) is a railway station on the IR Ishikawa Railway Line in Kaga, Ishikawa, Japan, operated by West Japan Railway Company (JR West) and the IR Ishikawa Railway.

== Lines ==
Kagaonsen Station is served by the IR Ishikawa Railway Line. It became a station on the Hokuriku Shinkansen when the extension of that line west of Kanazawa opened on 16 March 2024.

== Station layout ==
The station consists of two elevated island platforms with the station building underneath. The station has a Midori no Madoguchi staffed ticket office.

=== Platforms ===
1	■ IR Ishikawa Railway Line	for Fukui and Tsuruga
2	■ IR Ishikawa Railway Line	for Fukui and Tsuruga
3	■ IR Ishikawa Railway Line	for Komatsu and Kanazawa
4	■ IR Ishikawa Railway Line	for Komatsu and Kanazawa

11	■ Hokuriku Shinkansen	for Kanazawa, Tokyo
12	■ Hokuriku Shinkansen	for Fukui and Tsuruga

== History ==
The station opened on 11 October 1944 as Sakumi Station (作見駅). It was renamed Kagaonsen Station on 1 October 1970. With the privatization of JNR on 1 April 1987, the station came under the control of JR West.

Effective the timetable revision on 16 March 2024, the Hokuriku Shinkansen began operations at the station while the facilities of the Hokuriku Main Line were transferred to the IR Ishikawa Railway.

== Passenger statistics ==
In fiscal 2015, the station was used by an average of 2,229 passengers daily (boarding passengers only).

== Surrounding area ==
- Yamanaka Onsen
- Yamashiro Onsen
- Katayamazu Onsen

== See also ==
- List of railway stations in Japan
