= Echizen-Takefu Station =

Shinkansen railway station in Echizen, Fukui Prefecture, Japan

Coordinates: 35.896188°N 136.199133°E

Echizen-Takefu Station 越前たけふ駅
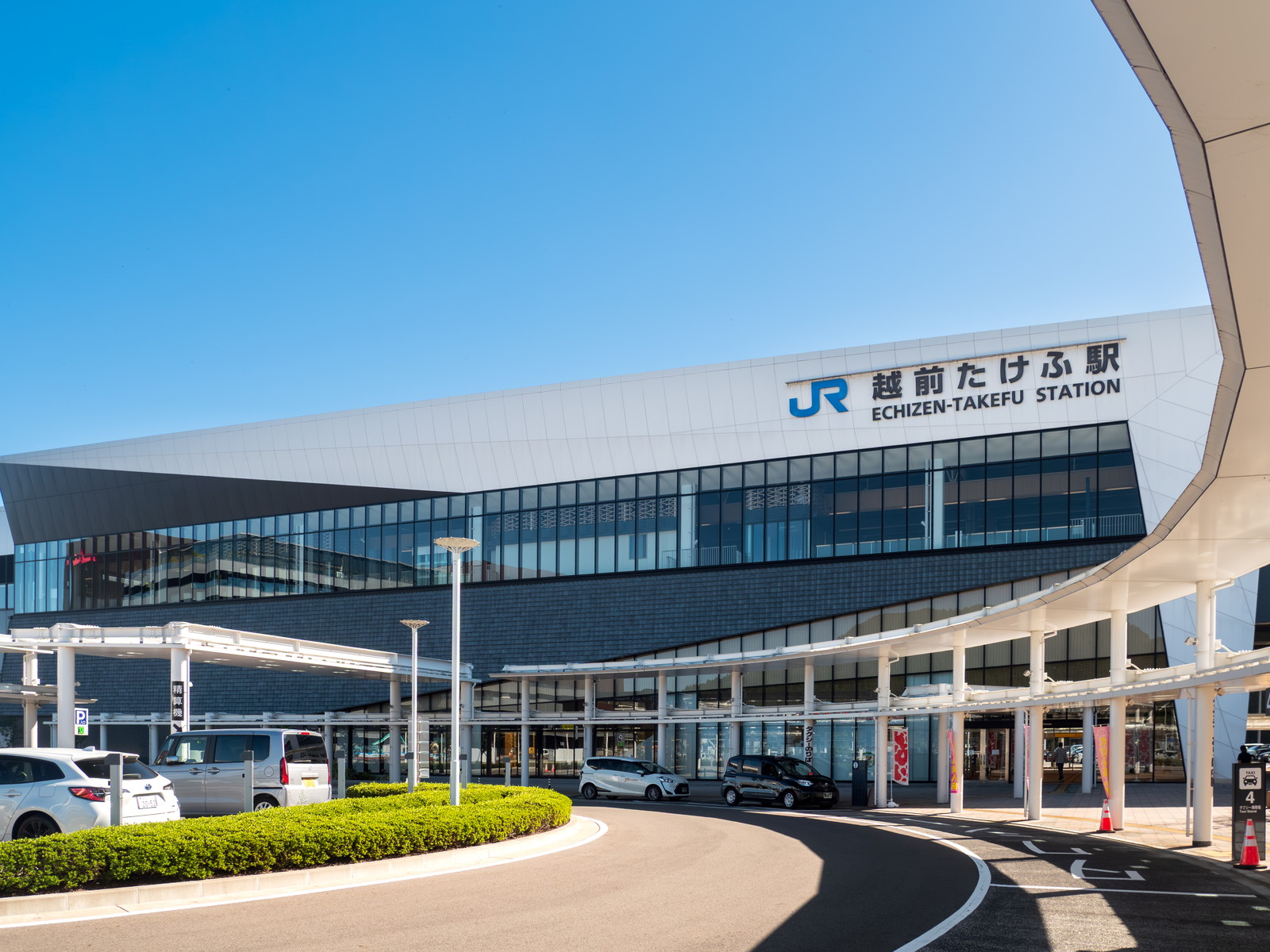
- Echizen-Takefu Station West Exit(October 2025)

General information
- Location: Echizen, Fukui Prefecture; Japan
- Operator: JR West
- Line: Hokuriku Shinkansen

History
- Opened: 16 March 2024

Services
Preceding station	JR West	Following station
Tsuruga Terminus	Hokuriku Shinkansen Kagayaki	Fukui towards Nagano
Tsuruga Terminus	Hokuriku Shinkansen Hakutaka	Fukui towards Jōetsumyōkō
Tsuruga Terminus	Hokuriku Shinkansen Tsurugi	Fukui towards Toyama
Location
- Location within Fukui Prefecture Location within Japan

Echizen-Takefu Station (越前たけふ駅, Echizen-takefu-eki) is a railway station on the Hokuriku Shinkansen, in Echizen, Fukui, Japan, operated by West Japan Railway Company (JR West). It opened on 16 March 2024 with the Hokuriku Shinkansen extension to Tsuruga.[New source needed?]

== History ==
The station's name is currently being used by Fukui Railway's Echizen-Takefu Station, however the Shinkansen station will inherit the name "Echizen-Takefu Station" while Fukui Railway's station will revert to "Takefu-Shin Station" (last changed in 2010). Its tentative name was Nan'etsu Station.

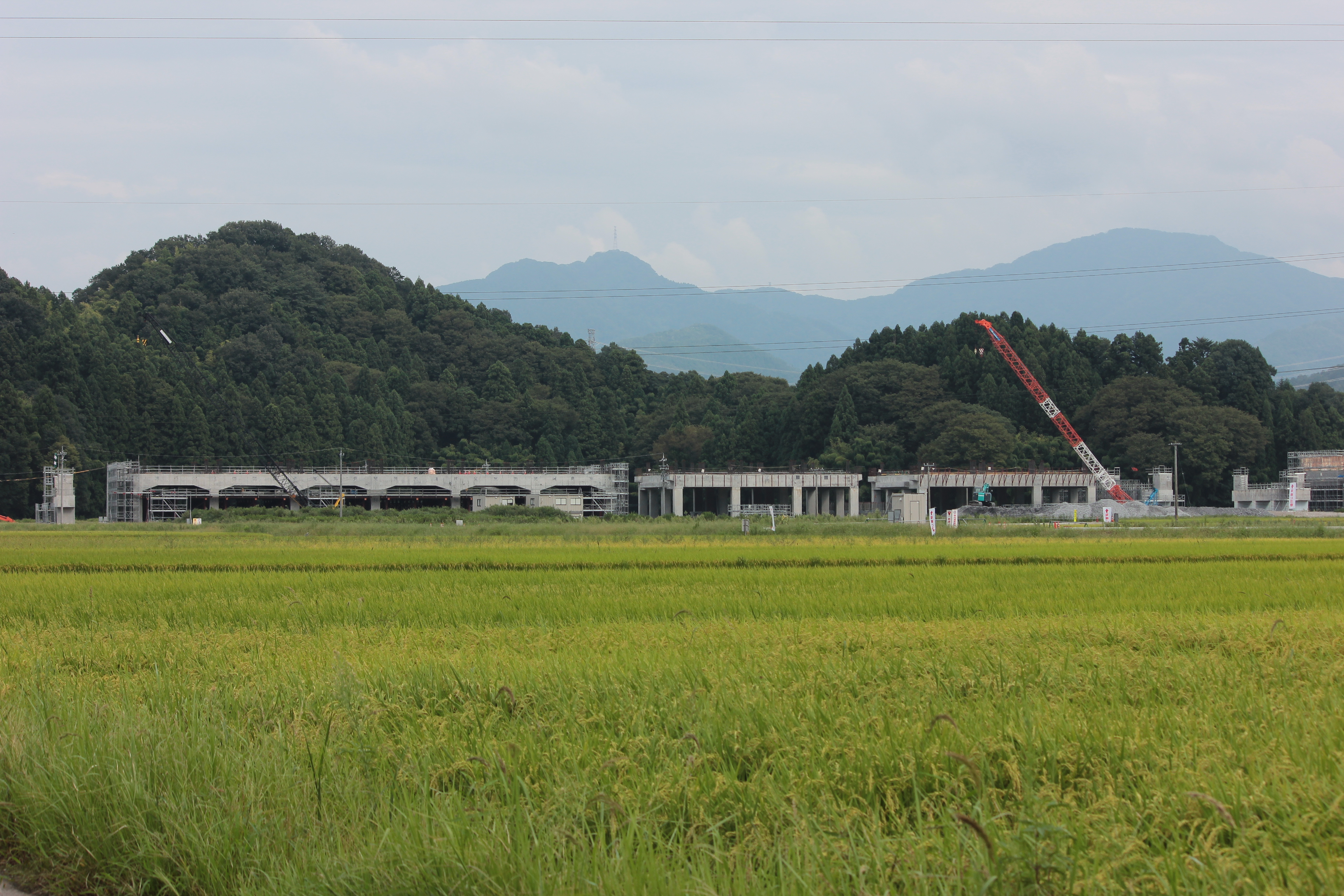
The station building under construction (September 2019)

== Lines ==
Echizen-Takefu Station is served by the high-speed Hokuriku Shinkansen when the line was extended west of Kanazawa to Tsuruga on 16 March 2024, with direct services to and from Tokyo.

=== Platforms ===
The station consist of 2 side platforms totaling to 2 tracks.

1	■ Hokuriku Shinkansen	for Fukui, Kanazawa and Tokyo
2	■ Hokuriku Shinkansen	for Tsuruga

== Surrounding area ==
- Takefu Interchange, on the Hokuriku Expressway
- National Route 8
- Takefu Station (Hokuriku Main Line), approximately 5 km west
- Takefu-shin Station (Fukui Railway Fukubu Line), approximately 5 km west
- Echizen City Office
- Jin-ai University
- Fukui Prefectural Takefu Higashi Senior High School
- Manyo Junior High School
- Kitahino Elementary School
- Kitashinjo Elementary School

== See also ==
- List of railway stations in Japan
