= E7 and W7 Series Shinkansen =

Japanese high-speed train type

E7 & W7 series
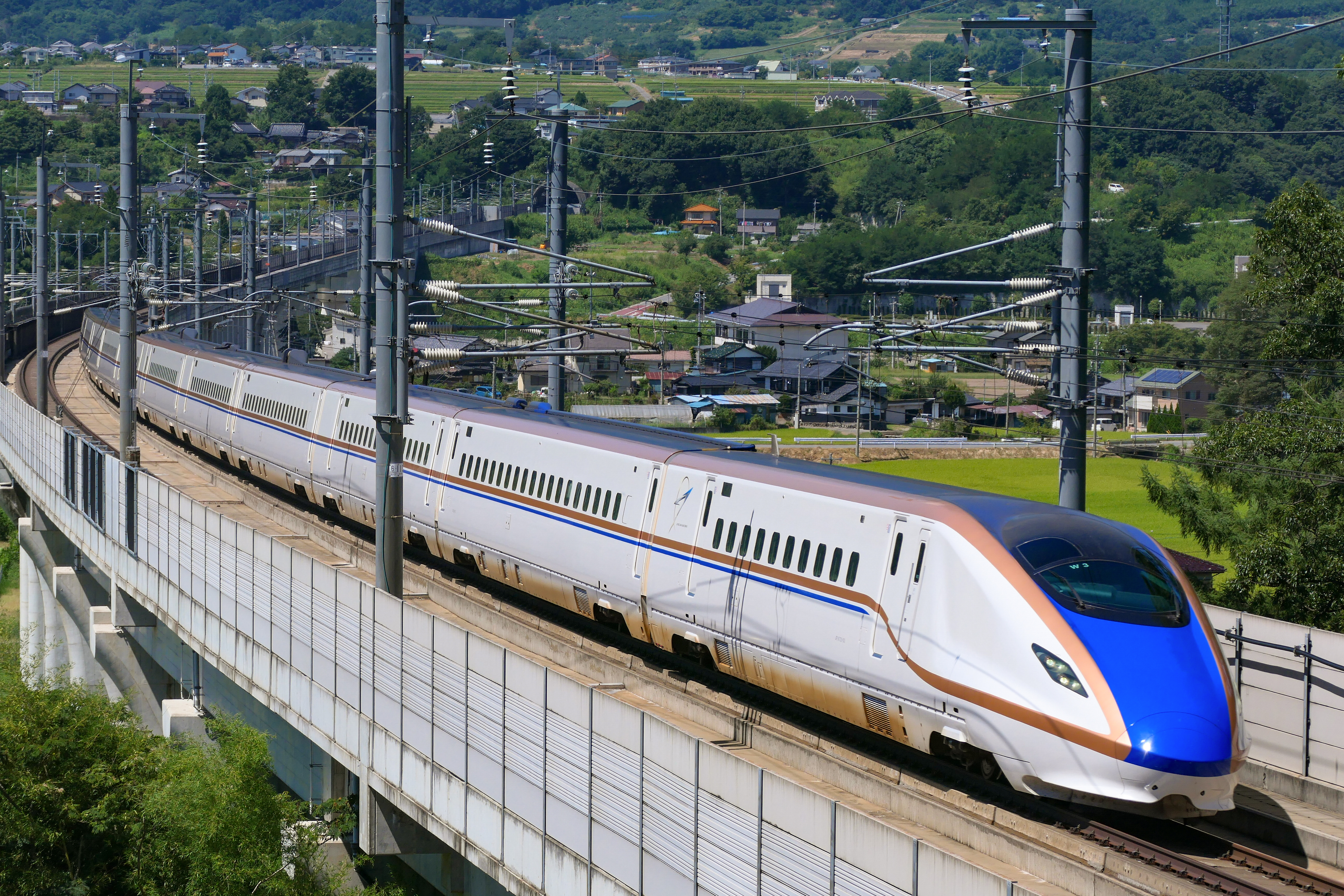
- W7 series set in August 2020
- In service: 15 March 2014 – present (E7); 14 March 2015 – present (W7)
- Manufacturers: Hitachi; Kawasaki Railcar Manufacturing; J-TREC (E7); Kinki Sharyo (W7)
- Designer: Ken Okuyama
- Replaced: E2 series, E4 series
- Constructed: 2013–2023
- Entered service: 2014 – present
- Number built: 852 vehicles (71 sets)
- Number in service: 732 vehicles (61 sets)
- Number scrapped: 120 vehicles (8 E7 & 2 W7 sets; flood damage)
- Formation: 12 cars per set
- Fleet numbers: F1–F47; W1–W24
- Capacity: 934
- Operators: JR East, JR West
- Depots: Hakusan, Nagano, Niigata
- Lines served: Hokuriku Shinkansen, Jōetsu Shinkansen

Specifications
- Car body construction: Aluminium alloy
- Car length: End cars: 26 m (85 ft); Intermediate cars: 25 m (82 ft)
- Width: 3.38 m (11.1 ft)
- Height: 3.65 m (12.0 ft)
- Doors: 2 sliding doors per side, per car
- Maximum speed: 275 km/h (171 mph)
- Weight: 540 t (1,190,000 lb)
- Power output: 12,000 kW (16,000 hp)
- Acceleration: 1.6 km/(h⋅s) (1.0 mph/s)
- Electric systems: Overhead line: 25 kV 50 Hz AC; 25 kV 60 Hz AC
- Current collection: Single-arm pantograph
- Safety systems: DS-ATC, RS-ATC
- Track gauge: 1,435 mm (4 ft 8 1/2 in) standard gauge

Notes/references
- This train won the 58th Blue Ribbon Award in 2015.

The E7 series (Japanese: E7系) and W7 series (W7系) Shinkansen are Japanese high-speed electric multiple unit train types operated on the Hokuriku and Jōetsu Shinkansen lines, and jointly developed by East Japan Railway Company (JR East) and West Japan Railway Company (JR West) respectively.

The E7 series has operated since 15 March 2014 on the Hokuriku Shinkansen. It also operates on the Jōetsu Shinkansen following the March 2019 timetable revision. 47 sets have been built, of which 39 are in service as of March 2024.

The W7 series has operated on the Hokuriku Shinkansen since it was extended from Nagano to Kanazawa in March 2015. The first W7 series train was delivered in April 2014. 24 sets have been built, of which 22 are in service as of March 2024.

== Design ==
Based on the earlier E2 series trains, the E7 and W7 series trains are designed with a "Japanese" theme inside and out, combining futuristic styling with traditional design elements overseen by industrial designer Ken Okuyama together with Kawasaki Heavy Industries. Externally, the roof is finished in a "sky blue" color, and the body sides are "ivory white" with "copper" and "sky blue" lining. The body side logos consist of a number "7" in silver stylized as an arrowhead, and include the lettering "East Japan Railway Company" or "West Japan Railway Company".

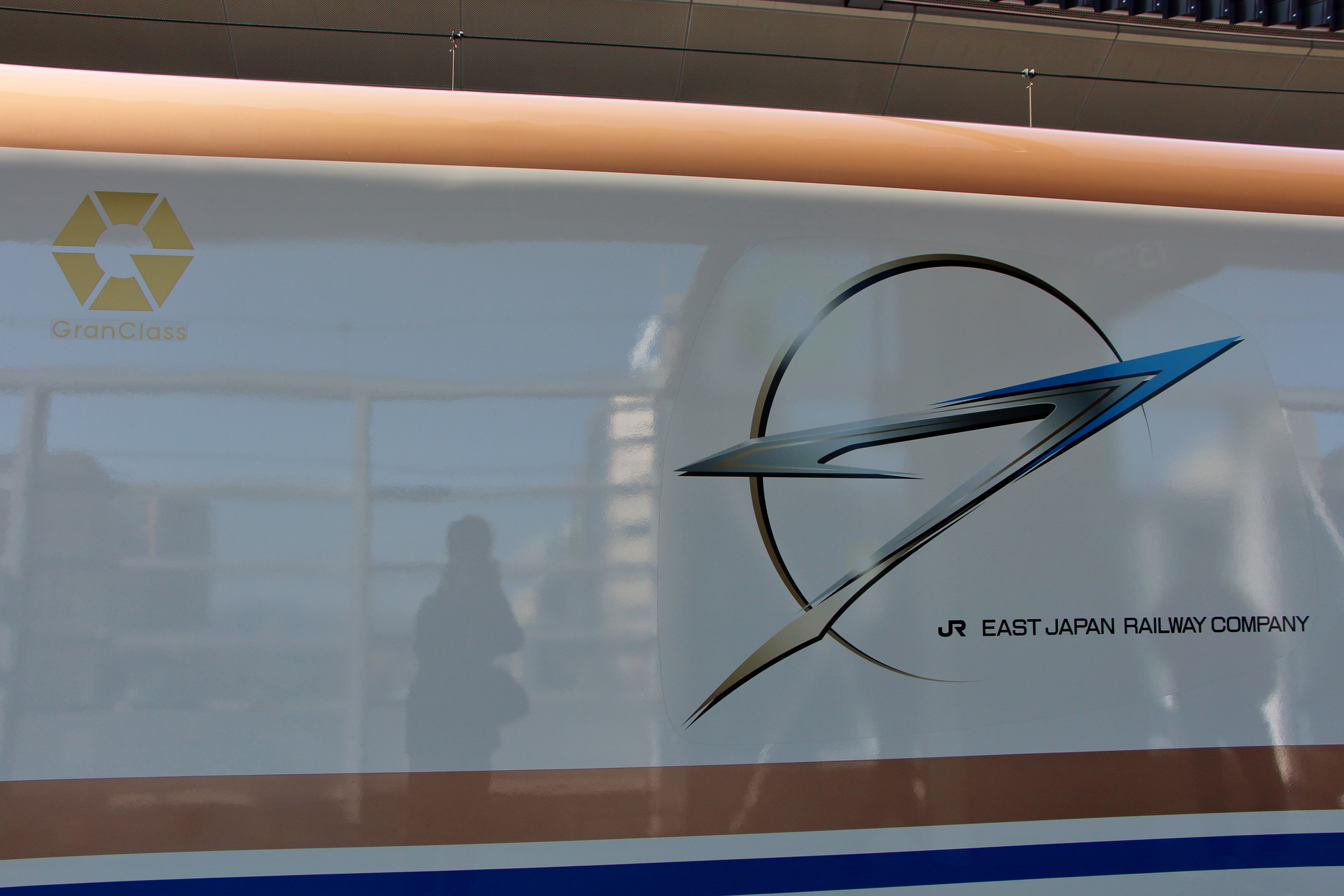
E7 Logo on the side of car 12

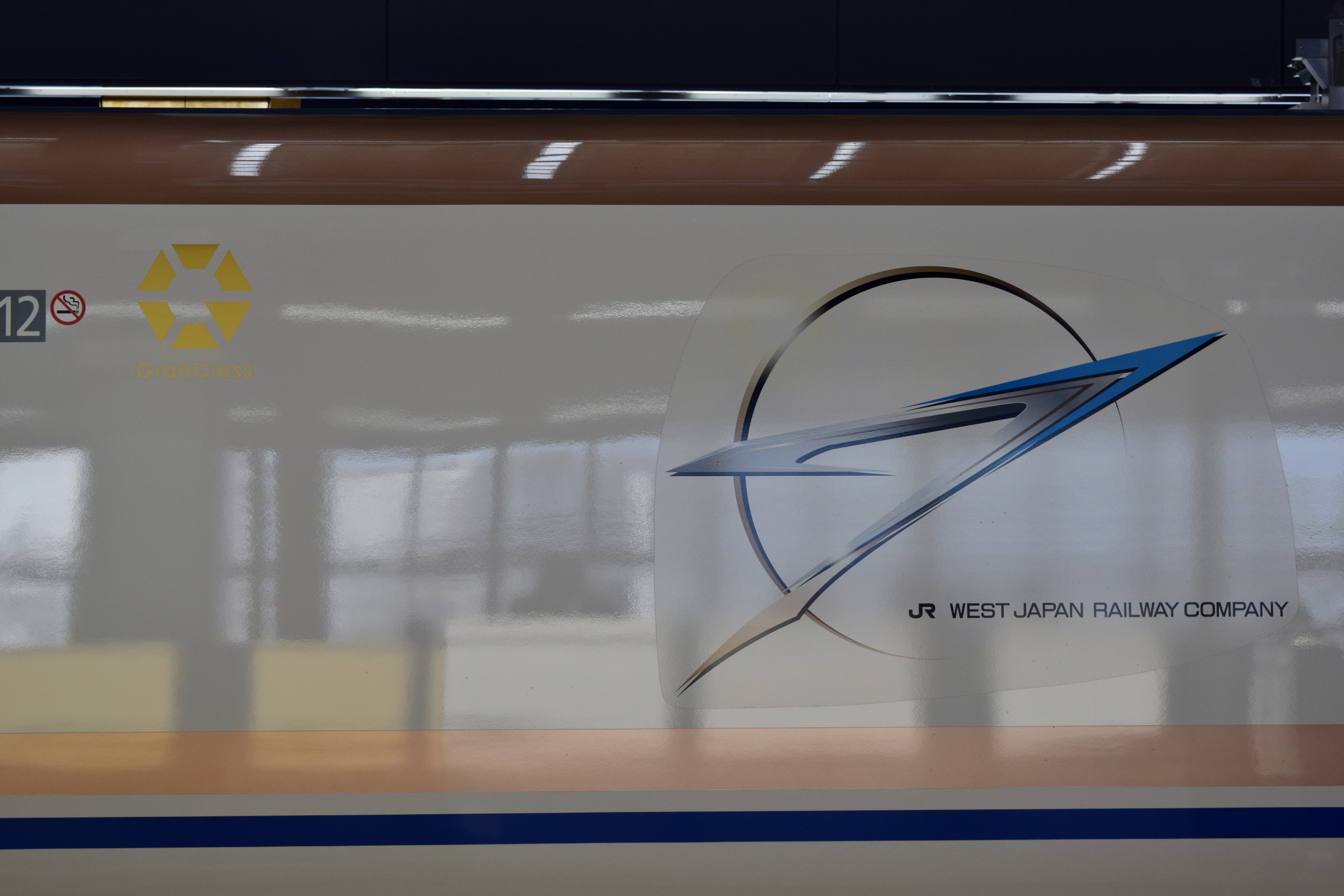
W7 Bodyside logo on car 12

Manufacturing of the E7 and W7 series sets was shared between Hitachi in Kudamatsu, Yamaguchi and Kawasaki Heavy Industries in Kobe; additionally the E7 in J-TREC in Yokohama, and W7 in Kinki Sharyo in Osaka.

The trains have a maximum design speed of 275 km/h (170 mph), achieving it between Omiya and Takasaki, and operate at a maximum speed of 260 km/h (160 mph) on the rest of the Hokuriku Shinkansen, and at 110 km/h (70 mph) on the Tohoku Shinkansen tracks between Tokyo and Omiya. Increased power output enables the trains to maintain speeds of at least 210 km/h (130 mph) on the steep gradients of the Hokuriku Shinkansen.

Car 12 (Gran Class) is equipped with full active suspension, and the other cars are equipped with semi-active suspension.

== Operations ==
- Kagayaki (Tokyo - Tsuruga), since March 2015
- Hakutaka (Tokyo - Tsuruga), since March 2015
- Tsurugi (Toyama - Tsuruga), since March 2015
- Asama (Tokyo - Nagano), since March 2014 (E7) and March 2015 (W7)
- Toki (Tokyo - Niigata), since March 2019 (E7)
- Tanigawa (Tokyo - Echigo-Yuzawa), since 3 March 2019 (mainly E7, but W7 also operates a few services between Tokyo and Takasaki)

The trains entered regular passenger service from the start of the revised JR East timetable on 15 March 2014, with three trainsets introduced on Asama services on the Hokuriku Shinkansen (then still called the Nagano Shinkansen) between Tokyo and Nagano. Initially, E7 series trainsets operated seven return Asama services daily, with a further four return workings added from 19 April 2014.

Since 14 March 2015, with the opening of the Hokuriku Shinkansen extension from Nagano to Kanazawa, E7 series trainsets are also used on Hakutaka, Kagayaki, and Tsurugi services alongside the similar design JR West W7 series trains.

== Interior ==
The 12-car trains have accommodation in three levels of service: Gran Class, Green car, and ordinary-class cars, with a total seating capacity of 934. Gran Class seating (car 12) is arranged 2+1 abreast with a seat pitch of 1,300 mm (51 in), Green car seating (car 11) is arranged 2+2 abreast with a seat pitch of 1,160 mm (46 in), and ordinary seating (cars 1 to 10) is arranged 3+2 abreast with a seat pitch of 1,040 mm (41 in). AC power outlets are provided for each seat in all three classes. The Gran class seats are supplied by Toyota Boshoku. Car saloons and vestibule areas are equipped with security cameras. Between October and December 2015, luggage racks are scheduled to be added at one end of each of the even-numbered ordinary class cars and also in Green car 11, by removing a pair of seats (1D and 1E). The luggage racks are to cater to the increased number of overseas tourists with suitcases and also passengers with ski and snowboard equipment in the winter season.

=== Gallery ===
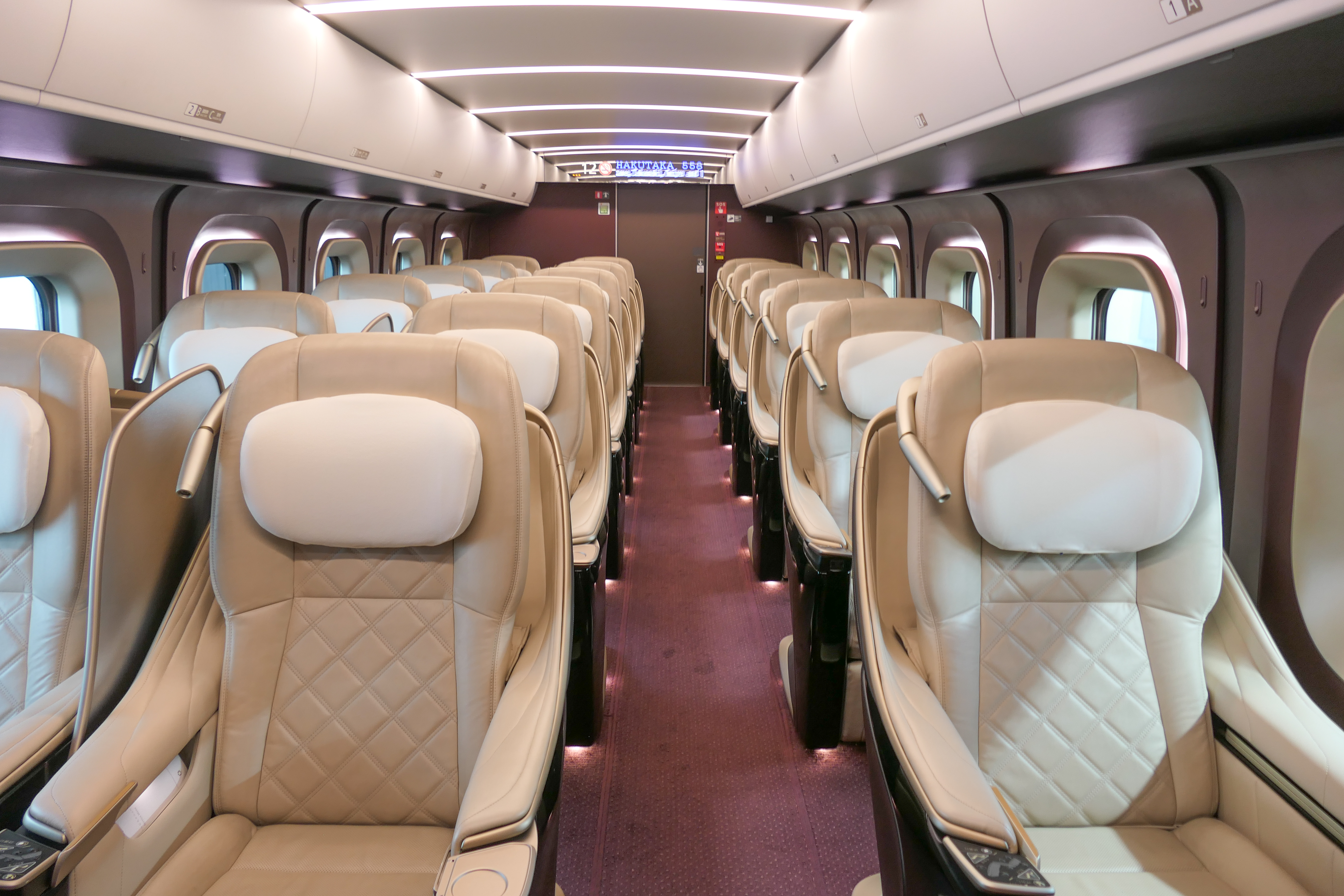
Interior of Gran Class car E714-5 (car 12) in May 2022

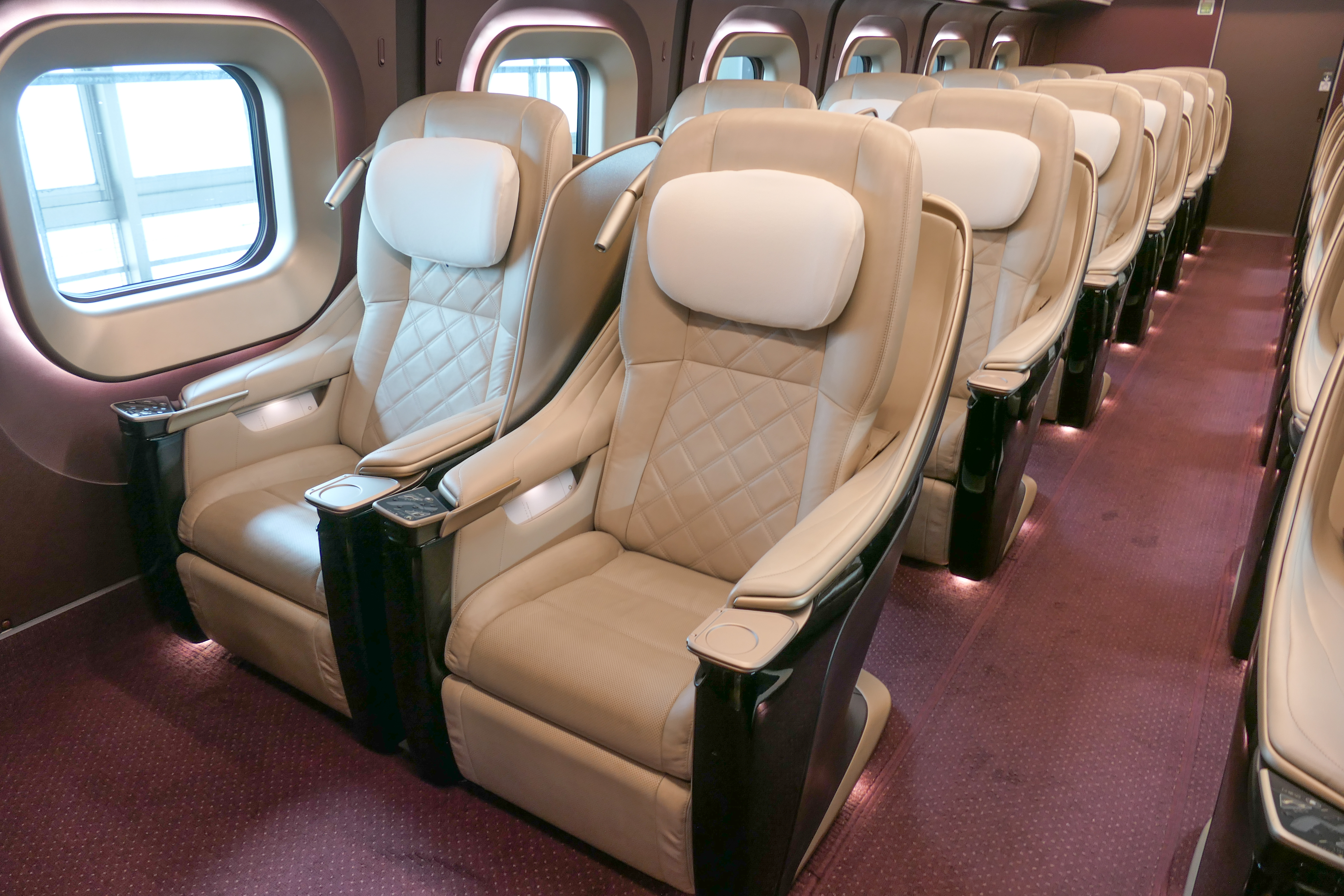
Gran Class seating in May 2022

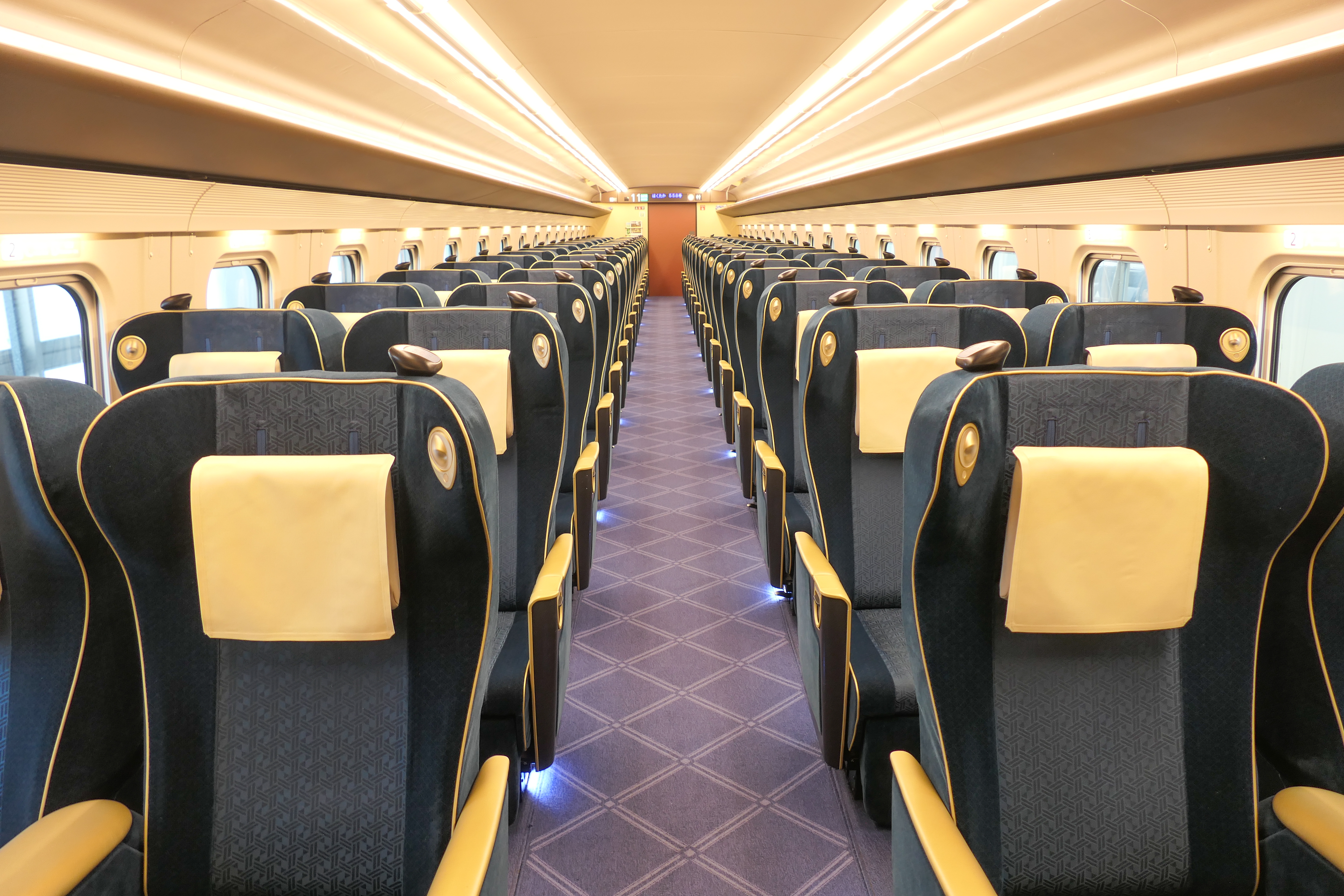
Interior of Green car E715-5 (car 11) in May 2022

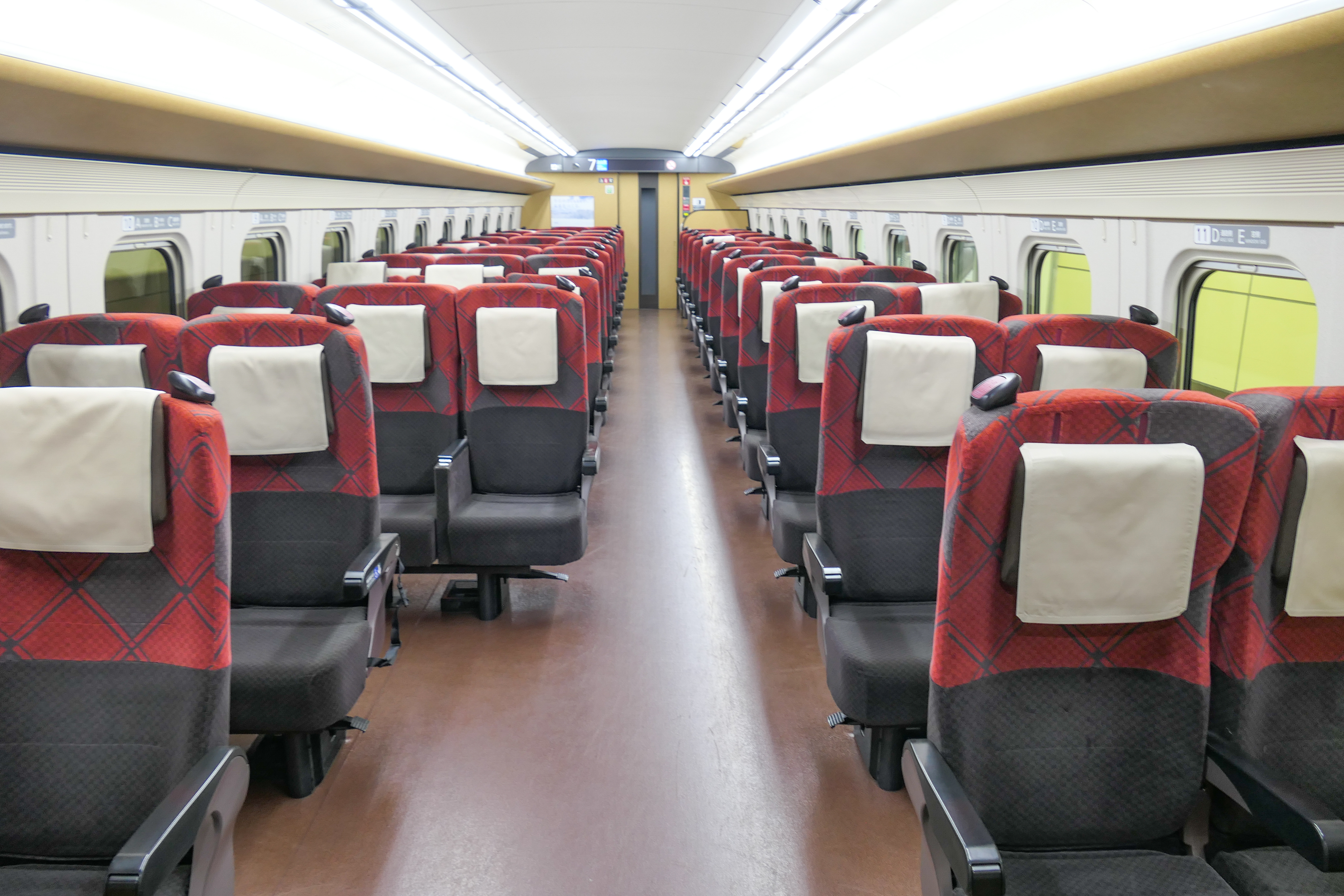
Interior of ordinary-class car E725-409 (car 7) in February 2022

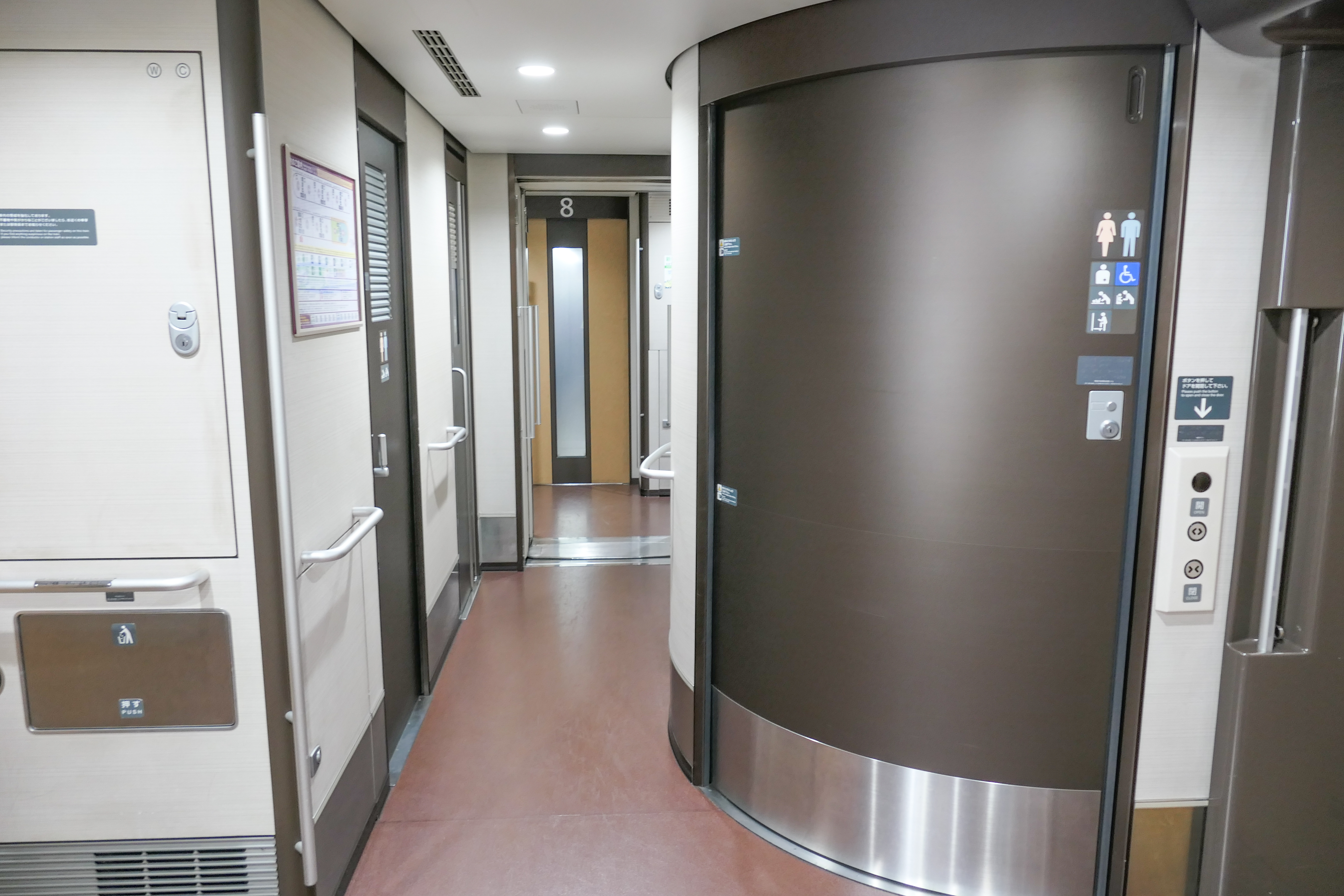
The toilet in ordinary car 7 in February 2022

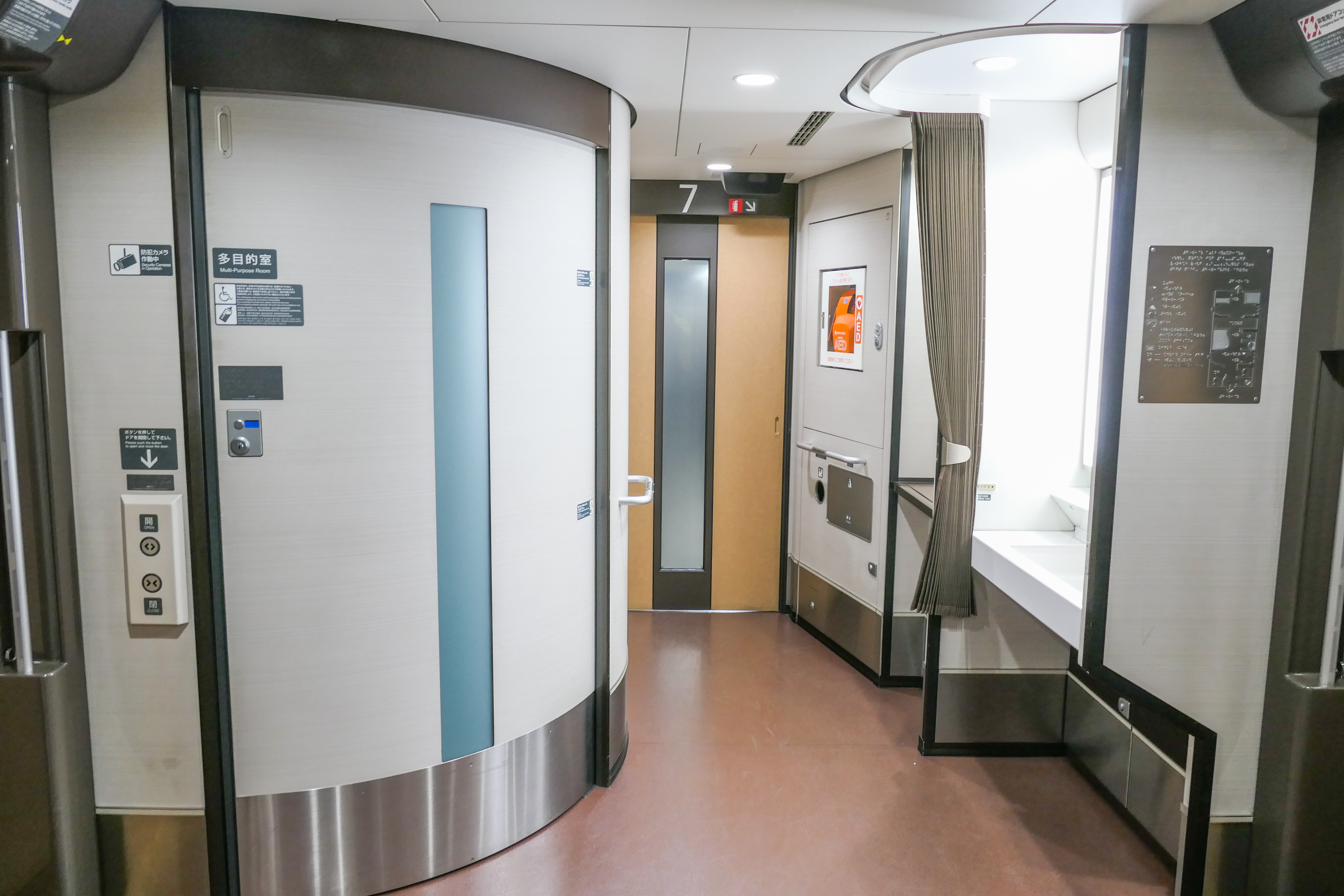
The Multipurpose room in February 2022

== Formations ==
The E7 series sets are numbered "F1" onward, and the W7 series sets are numbered "W1" onward. All sets consist of 10 motored intermediate cars with non-powered (trailer) end cars. Car 11 provides Green car (first class) accommodation, and car 12 provides Gran Class luxury accommodation. Sets are formed as shown below, with car 1 at the Tokyo end.

Car No.	1	2	3	4	5	6	7	8	9	10	11	12
Designation	Tc	M2	M1	M2	M1	M2	M1	M2	M1	M2	M1s	Tsc
Class	Ordinary										Green	Gran
Numbering (E7 series)	E723	E726‑100	E725	E726‑200	E725‑100	E726‑300	E725‑200	E726‑400	E725‑400	E726‑500	E715	E714
Numbering (W7 series)	W723‑100	W726‑100	W725‑100	W726‑200	W725‑200	W726‑300	W725‑300	W726‑400	W725‑400	W726‑500	W715‑500	W714‑500
Weight (t)	41.3	44.7	46.1	45.2	46.4	45.2	46.5	45.2	46.4	45.0	45.6	44.5
Capacity	50	100	85	100	85	90	58	100	85	100	63	18
Facilities	Toilet		Toilet		Toilet	Conductor's office	Toilet, wheelchair space		Toilet		Toilet, wheelchair space	Toilet

Cars 3 and 7 are each equipped with a single-arm pantograph.

== Build histories ==
As of 1 April 2021, 47 E7 series sets and 24 W7 series sets have been built, with build details as follows. Eight E7 series sets and two W7 series sets were withdrawn in 2020 following flood damage sustained during Typhoon Hagibis.

E7 series fleet
Set	Manufacturer	Delivered	Withdrawn
F1	Kawasaki	27 November 2013	31 March 2020
F2	Hitachi	25 December 2013	31 March 2020
F3	Hitachi	30 January 2014	
F4	Kawasaki	24 February 2014	
F5	Kawasaki	18 March 2014	
F6	Kawasaki	2 June 2014	
F7	J-TREC	26 June 2014	5 March 2020
F8	J-TREC	14 July 2014	31 March 2020
F9	J-TREC	27 August 2014	
F10	Hitachi	16 September 2014	14 January 2020
F11	J-TREC	6 October 2014	
F12	J-TREC	10 November 2014	
F13	Hitachi	19 December 2014	
F14	Hitachi	19 January 2015	31 March 2020
F15	Kawasaki	6 February 2015	
F16	Hitachi	8 April 2015	31 March 2020
F17	Kawasaki	6 March 2015	
F18	J-TREC	26 October 2015	31 March 2020
F19	Kawasaki	3 April 2017	
F20	Kawasaki	31 October 2018	
F21	Hitachi	20 November 2018	
F22	Kawasaki	5 December 2018	
F23	Hitachi	8 September 2019	
F24	Hitachi	8 September 2019	
F25	Kawasaki	7 October 2019	
F26	Hitachi	11 November 2019	
F27	Hitachi	24 January 2020	
F28	J-TREC	25 January 2022	
F29	Kawasaki	9 November 2020	
F30	Kawasaki	3 December 2020	
F31	Hitachi	26 February 2021	
F32	Kawasaki	11 May 2021	
F33	Hitachi	17 August 2021	
F34	Hitachi	6 October 2021	
F35	J-TREC	9 November 2021	
F36	Kawasaki	21 October 2021	
F37	Hitachi	3 August 2022	
F38	Kawasaki	6 December 2022	
F39	Kawasaki	30 January 2023	
F40	Hitachi	12 May 2021	
F41	Hitachi	4 June 2021	
F42	Kawasaki	7 June 2021	
F43	J-TREC	2 August 2021	
F44	Hitachi	14 January 2022	
F45	Hitachi	21 November 2022	
F46	Kawasaki	28 March 2023	
F47	Hitachi	11 January 2023	

W7 series fleet
Set	Manufacturer	Delivered	Withdrawn
W1	Kawasaki	30 April 2014	
W2	Hitachi	5 June 2014	31 March 2020
W3	Kawasaki	30 June 2014	
W4	Hitachi	18 July 2014	
W5	Kawasaki	21 August 2014	
W6	Kawasaki	11 September 2014	
W7	Kinki Sharyo	27 September 2014	31 March 2020
W8	Hitachi	15 October 2014	
W9	Hitachi	3 November 2014	
W10	Kinki Sharyo	26 December 2014	
W11	Hitachi	17 September 2015	
W12	Hitachi	29 October 2021	
W13	Hitachi	8 December 2021	
W14	Hitachi	31 March 2022	
W15	Hitachi	11 November 2023	
W16	Hitachi	2 December 2023	
W17	Kawasaki	31 May 2022	
W18	Kawasaki	6 July 2022	
W19	Kawasaki	5 July 2022	
W20	Kawasaki	24 August 2022	
W21	Kinki Sharyo	22 November 2022	
W22	Kawasaki	28 October 2022	
W23	Kinki Sharyo	18 October 2023	
W24	Hitachi	6 December 2022	

== History ==
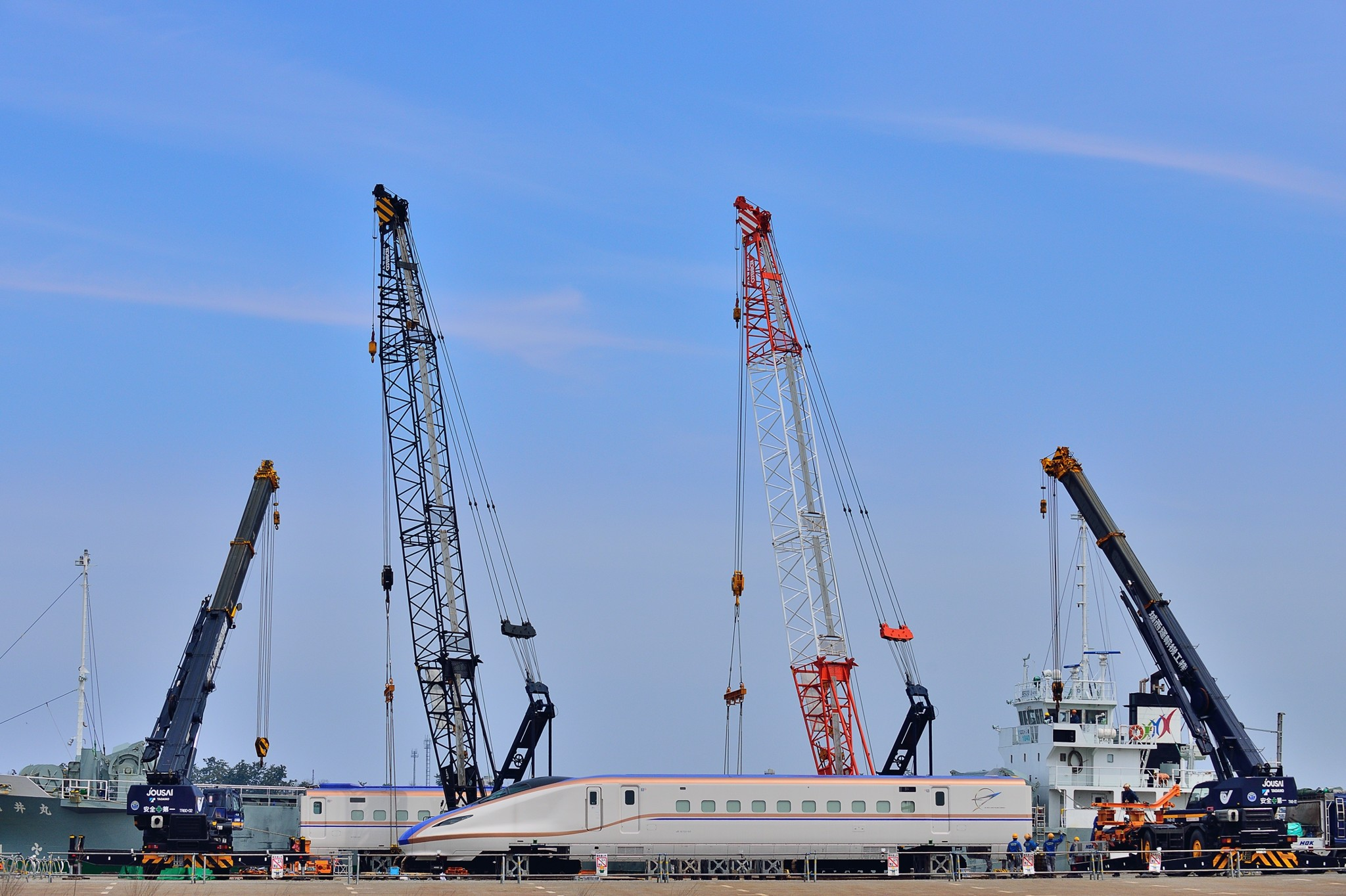
Cars of the first W7 series set, W1, being unloaded at Kanazawa Port in April 2014

In December 2011, the Mainichi Shimbun reported that JR East was considering developing new E7 series 10-car sets based on the existing E2 series design for use on Hokuriku Shinkansen services. In January 2012, the head of JR-West's Kanazawa Division revealed that new trains for the Hokuriku Shinkansen would be developed in conjunction with JR East, and that test running would need to be conducted during the winter season a year before the line opening to thoroughly test the ability of the trains to cope with snowy conditions. Details of the new trains were formally announced jointly by JR East and JR West on 4 September 2012.

The first E7 series train was delivered to Sendai Depot in November 2013, and shown off to the media on 28 November. Night-time testing commenced in December 2013 on the Nagano Shinkansen, with daytime test-running between Nagano and Tokyo starting on 8 January 2014. The design of the logo to be applied to the sides of cars 1 and 12 was officially unveiled in February 2014.

The first three trains, sets F1 to F3, entered regular passenger service from the start of the revised JR East timetable on 15 March 2014. The entire fleet of 17 sets, numbered F1 to F17, was delivered by the start of the 14 March 2015 timetable revision, although sets F16 and F17 did not enter revenue service until after this date.

The first W7 series train was delivered from Kawasaki Heavy Industries in Kobe to Hakusan Depot in Hakusan, Ishikawa in April 2014. Test-running on the Hokuriku Shinkansen began on 5 August 2014, initially at low speed, between Kanazawa and Jōetsumyōkō.

In April 2015, JR East announced that it was ordering an additional E7 series set to be introduced from autumn 2015, replacing the remaining E2 series trainsets used on regularly scheduled Hokuriku Shinkansen Asama services.

In May 2015, the W7 series and E7 series were awarded the 2015 Blue Ribbon Award, presented annually by the Japan Railfan Club. A presentation ceremony was held at JR West's Hakusan Depot on 24 October 2015.

On 12 October 2019, eight E7 series and two W7 series trains were damaged due to floodwaters from Typhoon Hagibis while they were stored at JR East Nagano Shinkansen Vehicle center. The sets were scrapped shortly thereafter.

In November 2021, JR East demonstrated autonomous operation with an E7 set in Niigata prefecture traveling 5 kilometres (3.1 mi) between Niigata Station and Niigata Shinkansen Rolling Stock Center. They started testing on 29 October.

From the start of the revised timetable on 18 March 2023, all train services on the Joetsu Shinkansen will be operated solely by E7 series sets as the line undergoes an operating speed increase from 240 to 275 km/h (150 to 170 mph). The trains will replace the older E2 series sets in the process.

== See also ==
- List of high speed trains
