= Hokuriku Shinkansen =

High-speed railway line in Japan

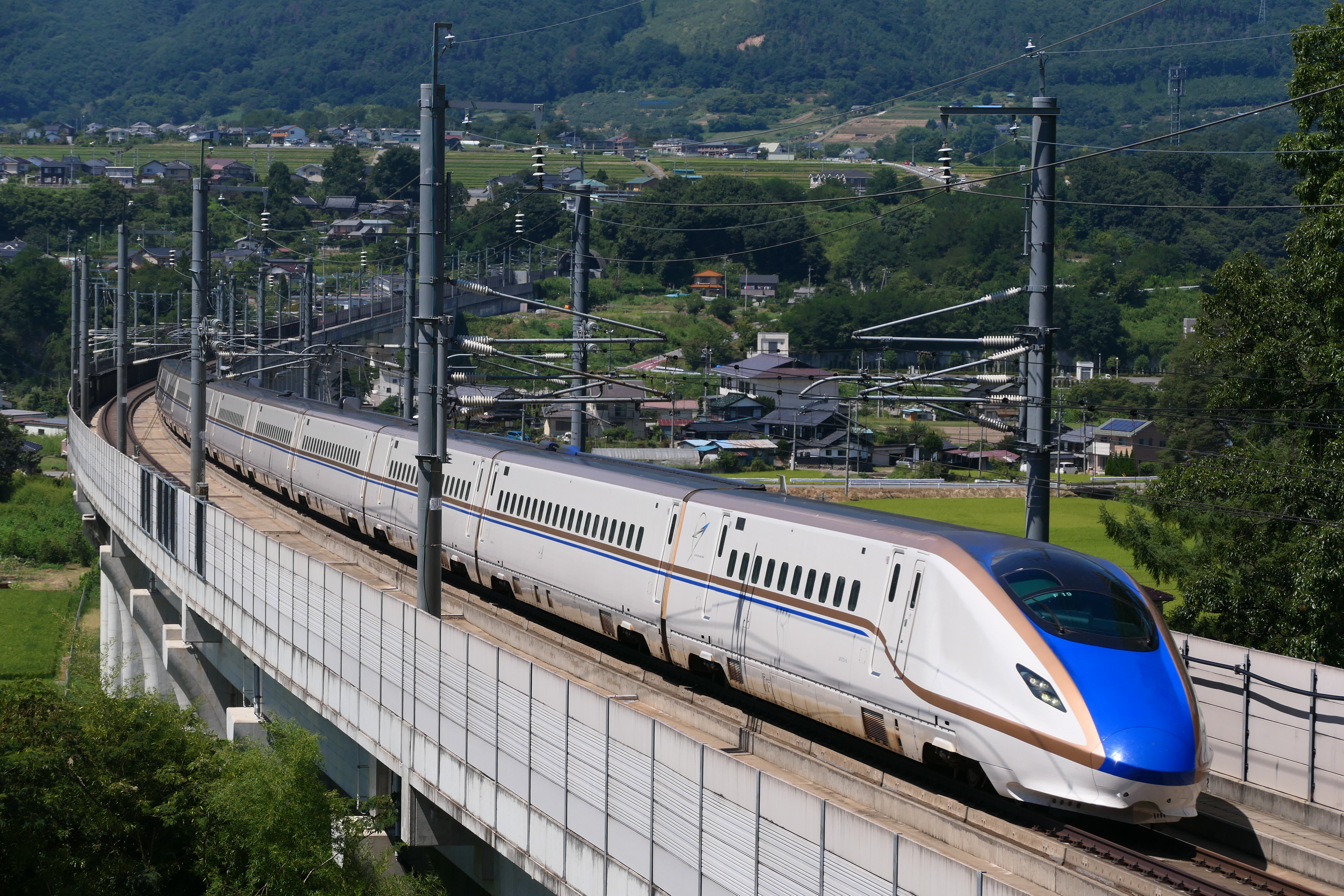
- JR East E7 series train on the Hokuriku Shinkansen

Overview
- Native name: 北陸新幹線
- Status: Operational
- Owner: JRTT
- Locale: Tokyo, Saitama, Gunma, Nagano, Niigata, Toyama, Ishikawa, and Fukui prefectures
- Termini: Tsuruga; Takasaki (through service to Tokyo)
- Stations: 24

Service
- Type: High-speed rail (Shinkansen)
- System: Shinkansen
- Services: Kagayaki; Hakutaka; Tsurugi; Asama
- Operator(s): JR East (Tokyo – Jōetsumyōkō); JR West (Jōetsumyōkō – Tsuruga)
- Depot(s): Nagano, Hakusan
- Rolling stock: E7; W7

History
- Opened: 1 October 1997; 28 years ago
- Last extension: 16 March 2024 (Kanazawa to Tsuruga)

Technical
- Line length: 470.6 km (292.4 mi)
- Number of tracks: 2
- Track gauge: 1,435 mm (4 ft 8 1/2 in) standard gauge
- Minimum radius: 4,000 m (2.5 mi; 13,000 ft)
- Electrification: Overhead line: 25 kV 50 Hz AC; 25 kV 60 Hz AC
- Operating speed: 260 km/h (160 mph)
- Signalling: Cab signalling
- Train protection system: DS-ATC
- Maximum incline: 3.0%
Route map

The Hokuriku Shinkansen (Japanese: 北陸新幹線) is a high-speed Shinkansen railway line connecting Tokyo with Tsuruga in the Hokuriku region of Japan. It is jointly operated by East Japan Railway Company (JR East) and West Japan Railway Company (JR West).

The first 117.4-kilometre (72.9 mi) section, between Takasaki and Nagano, opened on 1 October 1997, ahead of the 1998 Nagano Winter Olympics, and was originally known as the Nagano Shinkansen (長野新幹線). At Takasaki, the line connects with the Jōetsu Shinkansen, allowing services to continue to Tokyo. The line was extended 228.1 kilometres (141.7 mi) from Nagano to Kanazawa on 14 March 2015. A further 125-kilometre (78 mi) extension from Kanazawa to Tsuruga opened on 16 March 2024.

An extension from Tsuruga to Ōsaka is planned. The route was initially selected in December 2016 as an Obama–Kyoto route, with construction expected to begin in the late 2020s following environmental impact assessments. On 15 July 2026, the proposed alignment was revised to bypass Kyoto Station, and instead stop at a new deep underground station in Kyoto near Katsuragawa Station.

== Train names and service patterns ==
Since March 2015, services on the line are split into four types, with train names as listed below. Trains operate over the Joetsu and Tohoku Shinkansen tracks between Tokyo and Takasaki.

- Kagayaki: Tokyo–Tsuruga, limited-stop service, since 14 March 2015
- Hakutaka: Tokyo–Tsuruga, mostly all-stations service, since 14 March 2015
- Tsurugi: Toyama–Tsuruga, mostly all-stations shuttle service, since 14 March 2015
- Asama: Tokyo–Nagano, mostly all-stations service, corresponding to existing Nagano Shinkansen service introduced in 1997

The original Nagano Shinkansen Asama services, introduced in 1997, replaced the conventional Shin'etsu Main Line limited express services, also named Asama, which previously took 2 hours 50 minutes from Tokyo (Ueno Station) to Nagano. Following the opening of the Shinkansen, part of the conventional line was abandoned between Yokokawa and Karuizawa. This section included the steeply-graded Usui Pass which required the use of bank engines on all trains. Travel time between Tokyo and Tsuruga is 3 hours 8 minutes, 50 minutes shorter than using a conventional train between Kanazawa and Tsuruga.

== Stations ==
Service column legend:

●	All trains stop
▲	Some trains stop
|	All trains pass

Station	Distance in km (mi) from		Service				Transfers	Location	
Station	Takasaki	Tokyo	Kagayaki	Hakutaka	Asama	Tsurugi	Transfers	Location	
Tokyo 東京	108.60 (67.48)	0 (0)	●	●	●		Tōkaidō Shinkansen; Tōkaidō Main Line (JT01); Keihin–Tōhoku Line (JK26); Yamanote Line (JY01); Chūō Main Line (JC01); Yokosuka Line/Sōbu Line (Rapid) (JO19); Keiyō Line (JE01); Marunouchi Line (M-17)	Chiyoda	Tokyo
Ueno 上野	105.0 (65.2)	3.6 (2.2)	▲	●	●		Utsunomiya Line (JU02); Keihin–Tōhoku Line (JK30); Yamanote Line (JY05); Jōban Line (JJ01); Tokyo Metro Ginza Line (G-16); Tokyo Metro Hibiya Line (H-18); Keisei Main Line (Keisei Ueno: KS01)	Taitō	Tokyo
Ōmiya 大宮	77.3 (48.0)	31.3 (19.4)	●	●	●		Tōhoku Shinkansen; Akita Shinkansen; Yamagata Shinkansen; Keihin–Tōhoku Line (JK47); Saikyō Line (JA26); Utsunomiya Line/Takasaki Line (JU07); Shōnan-Shinjuku Line (JS24); ■ Kawagoe Line; Tōbu Urban Park Line (TD07); New Shuttle (NS01)	Ōmiya-ku	Saitama
Kumagaya 熊谷	40.7 (25.3)	67.9 (42.2)	|	|	●		■ Chichibu Main Line (CR09); ■ Takasaki Line	Kumagaya	Saitama
Honjō-Waseda 本庄早稲田	19.6 (12.2)	89.0 (55.3)	|	|	●			Honjō	Saitama
Takasaki 高崎	0 (0)	108.6 (67.5)	|	●	●		Jōetsu Shinkansen; ■ Jōshin Line; ■ Agatsuma Line (Note: Although the official terminus of the Ryōmō Line is at Shin-Maebashi and that of the Agatsuma Line is at Shibukawa, trains on both lines run through to Takasaki.); ■ Hachikō Line; ■ Jōetsu Line; ■ Ryōmō Line; ■ Shin'etsu Main Line; ■ Takasaki Line	Takasaki	Gunma
Annaka-Haruna 安中榛名	18.5 (11.5)	127.1 (79.0)	|	|	▲			Annaka	Gunma
Karuizawa 軽井沢	41.8 (26.0)	150.4 (93.5)	|	▲	●		Shinano Railway Line	Karuizawa	Nagano
Sakudaira 佐久平	59.4 (36.9)	168.0 (104.4)	|	▲	●		■ Koumi Line	Saku	Nagano
Ueda 上田	84.2 (52.3)	192.8 (119.8)	|	▲	●		Shinano Railway Line; Ueda Electric Railway Bessho Line	Ueda	Nagano
Nagano 長野	117.4 (72.9)	226.0 (140.4)	●	●	●		■ Iiyama Line (Note: Although the official terminus of the Iiyama Line is at Toyono, trains on the line run through to Nagano.); Shin'etsu Main Line; Kita-Shinano Line; Nagano Electric Railway Nagano Line	Nagano	Nagano
Iiyama 飯山	147.3 (91.5)	255.9 (159.0)	|	▲			■ Iiyama Line	Iiyama	Nagano
Jōetsumyōkō 上越妙高	176.9 (109.9)	285.5 (177.4)	|	●			ETR Myōkō Haneuma Line	Jōetsu	Niigata
Itoigawa 糸魚川	213.9 (132.9)	322.5 (200.4)	|	●			■ Ōito Line; ETR Nihonkai Hisui Line	Itoigawa	Niigata
Kurobe-Unazukionsen 黒部宇奈月温泉	253.1 (157.3)	361.7 (224.7)	|	●			Toyama Chihō Railway Main Line (Shin-Kurobe)	Kurobe	Toyama
Toyama 富山	286.9 (178.3)	395.5 (245.8)	●	●		●	■ Takayama Main Line; Ainokaze Toyama Railway Line; Toyama Chihō Railway; ■ Toyama Chihō Main Line; ■ Tateyama Line; ■ Fujikoshi-Kamidaki Line; Toyama City Tram Line; ■ Toyamakō Line	Toyama	Toyama
Shin-Takaoka 新高岡	305.8 (190.0)	414.4 (257.5)	|	●		●	■ Jōhana Line	Takaoka	Toyama
Kanazawa 金沢	345.5 (214.7)	454.1 (282.2)	●	●		●	■ Nanao Line; IR Ishikawa Railway Line; ■ Asanogawa Line	Kanazawa	Ishikawa
Komatsu 小松	372.6 (231.5)	481.2 (299.0)	▲	●		▲	IR Ishikawa Railway Line	Komatsu	Ishikawa
Kagaonsen 加賀温泉	387.1 (240.5)	495.7 (308.0)	▲	●		▲	IR Ishikawa Railway Line	Kaga	Ishikawa
Awaraonsen 芦原温泉	403.5 (250.7)	512.0 (318.1)	▲	●		▲	Hapi-Line Fukui Line	Awara	Fukui
Fukui 福井	421.5 (261.9)	530.0 (329.3)	●	●		●	■ Etsumi-Hoku Line (Kuzuryū Line); Hapi-Line Fukui Line; ■ Katsuyama Eiheiji Line; ■ Mikuni Awara Line; ■ Fukubu Line	Fukui	Fukui
Echizen-Takefu 越前たけふ	440.5 (273.7)	549.0 (341.1)	▲	●		▲		Echizen	Fukui
Tsuruga 敦賀	470.6 (292.4)	579.2 (359.9)	●	●		●	A B Hokuriku Main Line; ■ Obama Line; Hapi-Line Fukui Line	Tsuruga	Fukui
Environmental impact assessment is underway.
Higashi-Obama 東小浜 (Note: This is a tentative name)							■ Obama Line	Obama	Fukui
Katsuragawa 桂川							A JR Kyoto Line	Minami	Kyoto
Matsuiyamate 松井山手							Katamachi Line (Gakkentoshi Line)	Kyōtanabe	Kyoto
Shin-Ōsaka 新大阪							Tokaido Shinkansen; San'yō Shinkansen; A JR Kyoto Line; F Osaka Higashi Line; Osaka Metro Midōsuji Line	Yodogawa-ku	Osaka

=== Notes ===
- The boundary between JR East and JR West lies immediately to the north of Jōetsumyōkō Station. Due to Kagayaki services skipping this stop, crew changes occur at Nagano Station, this does not apply to Hakutaka services which crew change at Jōetsumyōkō Station. Asama and Tsurugi services do not need crew changes as they stay within their respective JR boundaries
- Stations in italics are not currently operational.

== Rolling stock ==
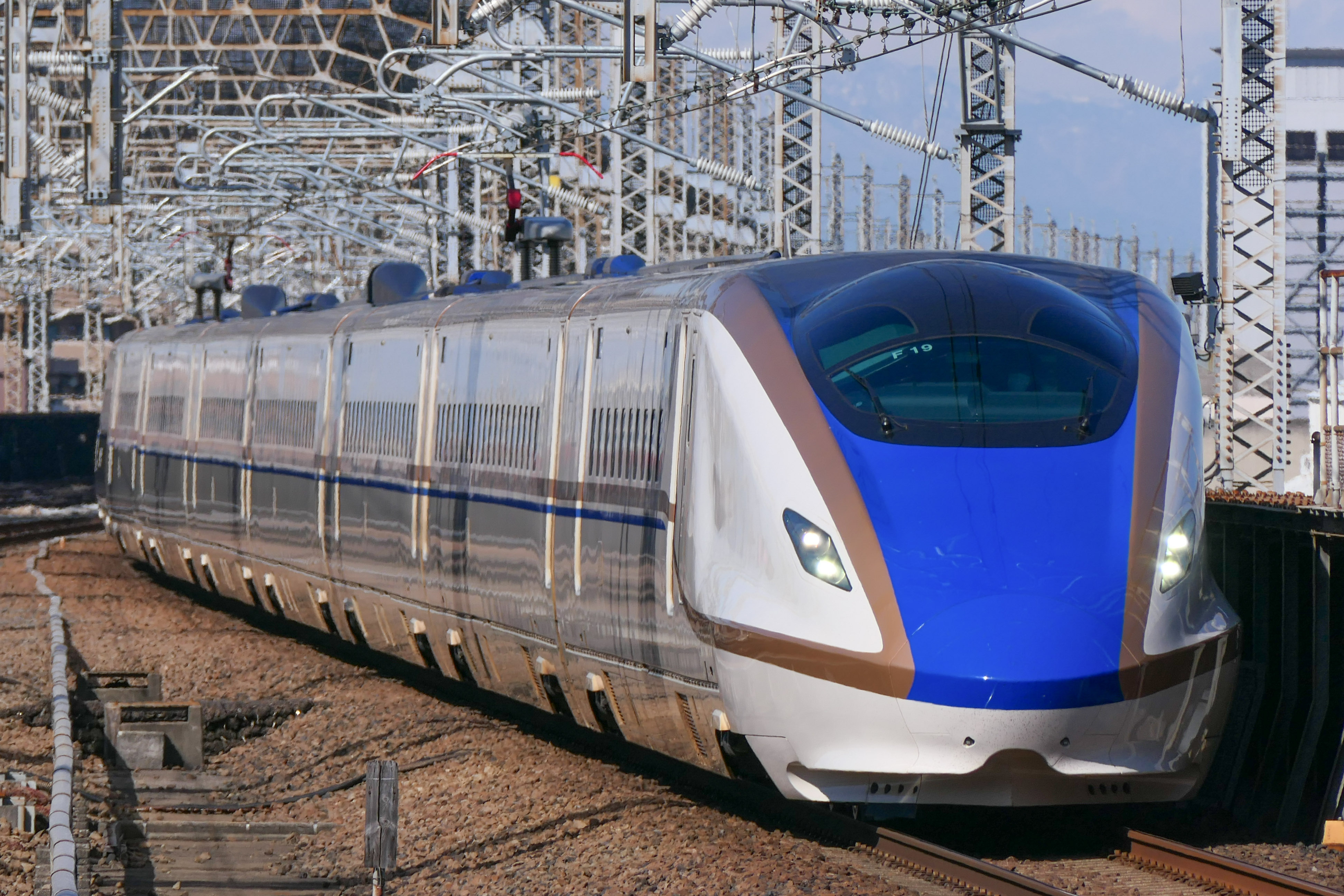
E7 series set F19 on an Asama service in February 2021

- E7 series 12-car "F" sets" (since 15 March 2014)
- W7 series 12-car "W" sets" (since 14 March 2015)

With the start of Nagano Shinkansen services, trains were operated by a new fleet of JR East E2 series 8-car sets. A fleet of 17 new E7 series 12-car trainsets were phased in from March 2014, and these were augmented by a fleet of 10 JR West W7 series 12-car sets introduced from March 2015. The fleet of W7 series was purchased at a cost of ¥32.8 billion. The remaining E2 series trainsets were withdrawn from Hokuriku Shinkansen services on 31 March 2017.

In 2019, ten trains, eight from JR East with a book value of ¥11.8 billion and two from JR West, were damaged when a train yard in Nagano was flooded as the Chikuma River overflowed during typhoon Hagibis. As a result, JR West suffered a loss of ¥3 billion (2019) (equivalent to ¥3.25 billion or US$21.49 million in 2024).

=== Non-revenue-earning types ===
- East i (E926)

=== Former rolling stock ===
- E2 series 8-car "N" sets on Tokyo - Nagano Asama services only
- E2 series 8-car "J" sets
- E4 series 8-car "P50/P80" sets as Max Asama
- 200 series 12-car set F80 during February 1998 only

The original E2 series 8-car "J" sets, primarily used on Tohoku Shinkansen services were also used on some Asama services until they were subsequently lengthened to 10 cars. One specially-modified 200 series set, numbered F80, was used on additional Asama services in February 1998 during the 1998 Winter Olympics held in Nagano. The train was modified to operate on both 25 kV AC 50 Hz and 60 Hz overhead power supplies, incorporated weight-saving measures to comply with the 16 tonne axle load restriction, and included additional control equipment to cope with the 30‰ gradient of the Nagano Shinkansen. Its maximum speed was limited to 210 km/h (130 mph). The last services operated using eight-car E2 series trainsets ran on 31 March 2017, from which date all Asama services were formed of E7 and W7 series trainsets.

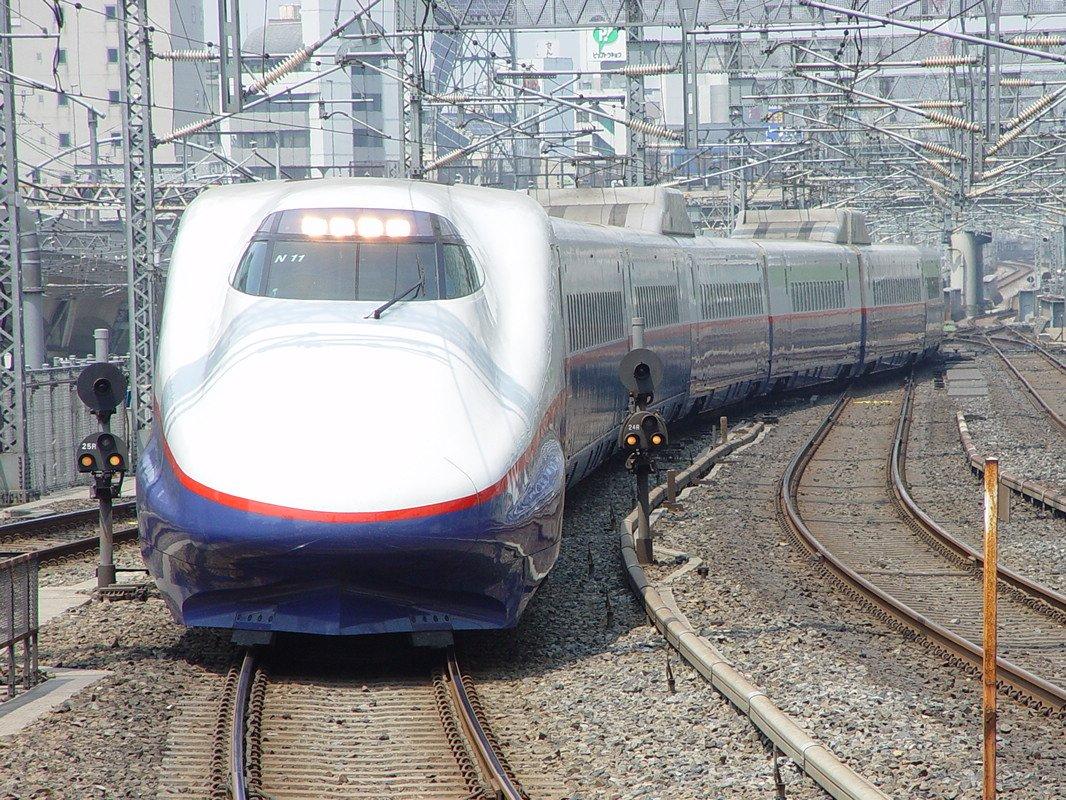
Nagano Shinkansen E2 series "N" set (Set N11) approaching Tokyo, June 2002

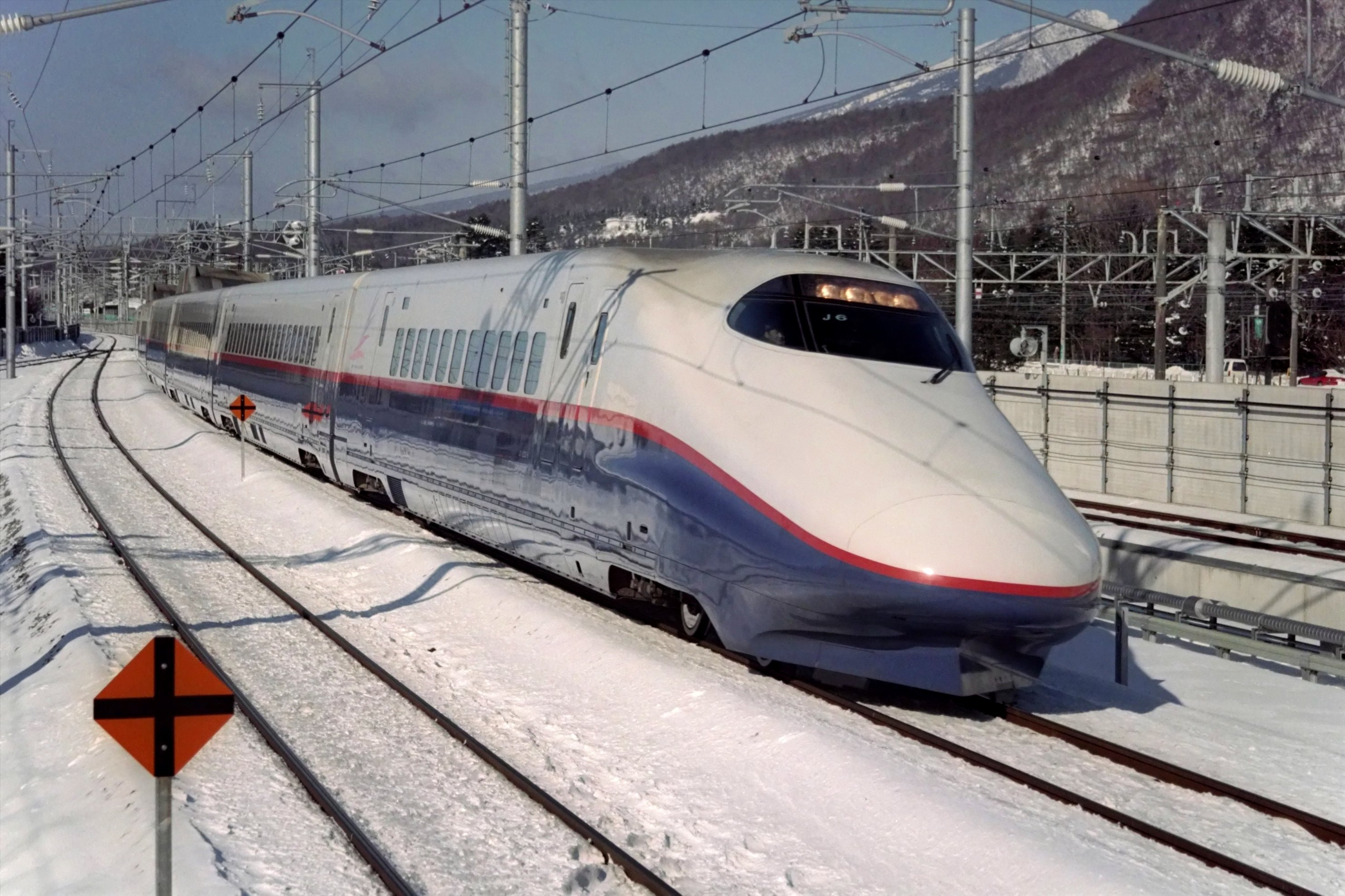
Nagano Shinkansen E2 series "J" set (Set J6) approaching Karuizawa, February 1998

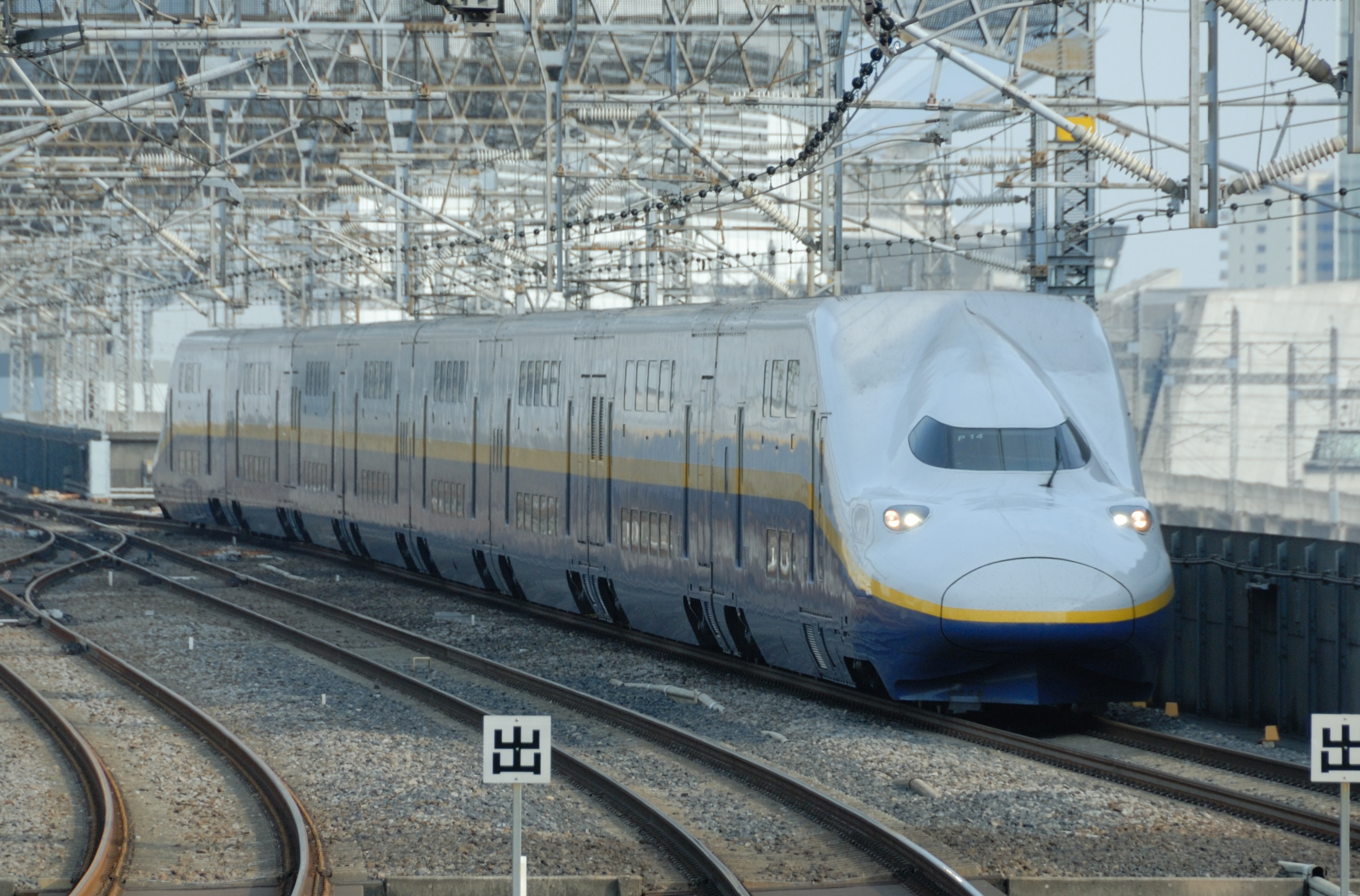
An E4 series set (Set P14)

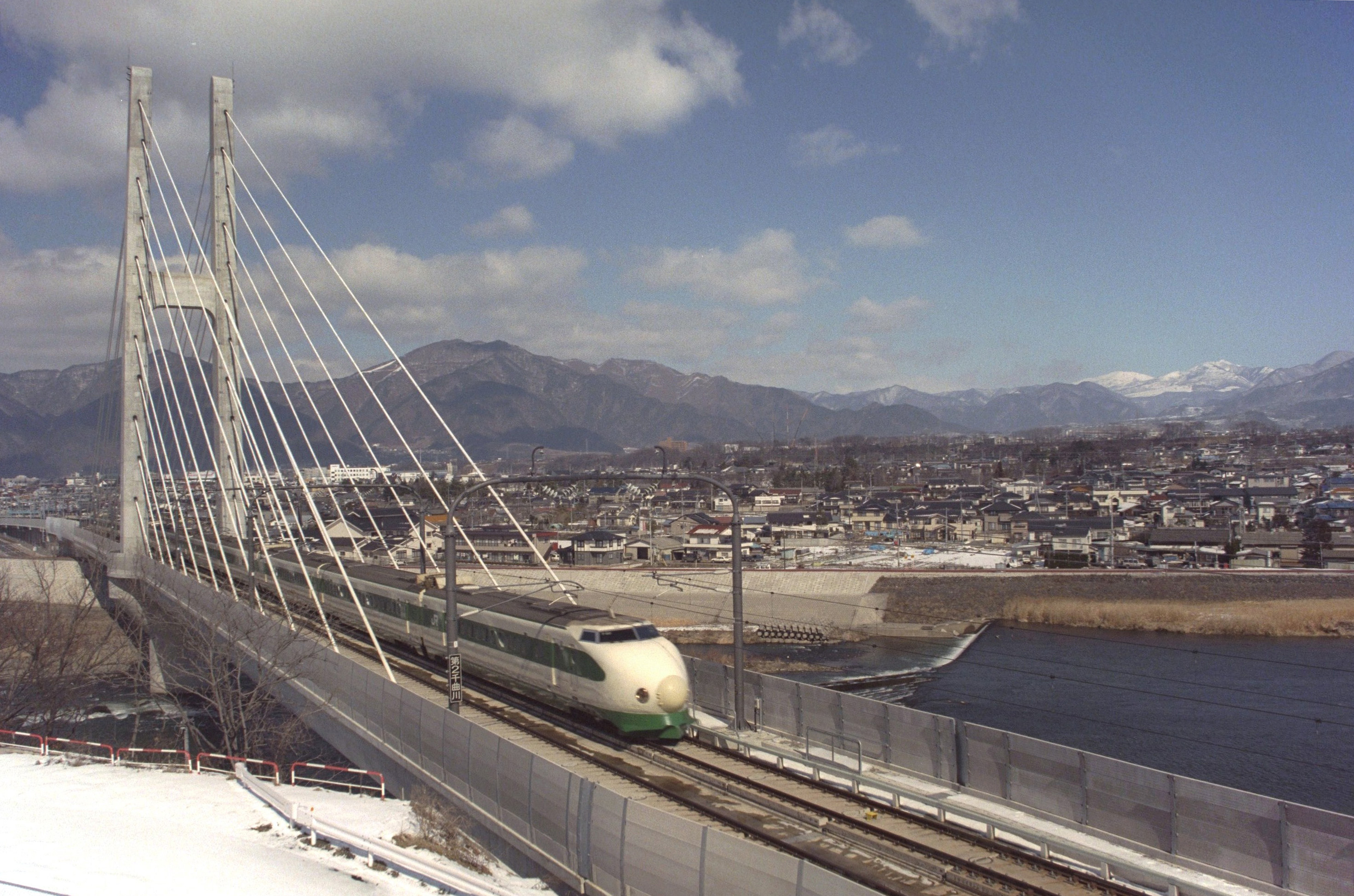
Modified set F80 on a Nagano Shinkansen Asama service, February 1998

=== Speeds ===
The maximum speed on the Hokuriku Shinkansen line is 260 km/h (160 mph) between Tsuruga and Takasaki. Services continue beyond Takasaki on the Jōetsu Shinkansen line to Ōmiya, where the maximum speed is 275 km/h (171 mph). Between Ōmiya and Tokyo, Hokuriku Shinkansen services operate over the Tōhoku Shinkansen line, with a maximum speed of 130 km/h (81 mph) between Ōmiya and Ueno and 110 km/h (68 mph) between Ueno and Tokyo.

=== Electrification ===
The Hokuriku Shinkansen is electrified at 25 kV AC, but uniquely amongst Shinkansen routes, it crosses Japan’s 50 Hz/60 Hz frequency boundary three times, requiring dual-frequency rolling stock. The section between Tokyo and Karuizawa operates at 50 Hz, while the section between Karuizawa and Itoigawa operates at 60 Hz. The frequency then changes back to 50 Hz between Itoigawa and Kurobe-Unazukionsen, before returning to 60 Hz for the remainder of the line to Tsuruga. The E7 series and W7 series trainsets are equipped with onboard converters and automatic frequency-switching equipment to operate across the different power systems.

== History ==
=== Nagano Shinkansen ===
The initial section between Takasaki and Nagano opened on 1 October 1997, in time for the 1998 Winter Olympics in Nagano.

Between May 2012 and March 2014, station platforms on the Nagano Shinkansen had their platform roofs extended to handle the E7 series 12-car trains which entered service in March 2014 ahead of the March 2015 opening of the extension beyond Nagano. The Hokuriku Shinkansen extension from Nagano to Kanazawa opened in March 2015. The 113 km (70 mi) extension from Kanazawa to Tsuruga was approved for construction in June 2012.

From the start of the revised timetable on 15 March 2014, E7 series trainsets were introduced on Asama services. Initially used on seven return services daily, this number was increased to eleven return services daily from 19 April 2014.

=== Naming ===
The line's legal name has always been Hokuriku Shinkansen. However, just before the opening of the Nagano section, JR East decided that using this name in passenger service was to be avoided. From 22 March 1997 until the extension of the Hokuriku Shinkansen to Kanazawa, the primary route for Hokuriku customers (from the Tokyo area) was to use the Joetsu Shinkansen to Echigo-Yuzawa Station, then transfer to a Hakutaka service via the Hokuetsu Express, rendering using the Takasaki–Nagano section of the Hokuriku Shinkansen meaningless for them. Therefore, JR East sought other names.

Alternatively, local governments in Hokuriku, fearing construction west of Nagano may be halted, petitioned that the name "Hokuriku" should remain in use for operational purposes.

JR East announced the following solution on 25 July 1997:

- Voice announcements using "Nagano Shinkansen"
- Tokyo area stations using depictions with "Nagano-bound Shinkansen".
- Stations between Annaka-Haruna Station and Nagano Station depicting "Shinkansen" only.

Soon, "Nagano-bound Shinkansen" fell out of use, and timetables by various publishers use "Nagano Shinkansen" only. Construction to Kanazawa was officially decided, thereby reducing the opposition to the name.

=== Extension beyond Nagano ===
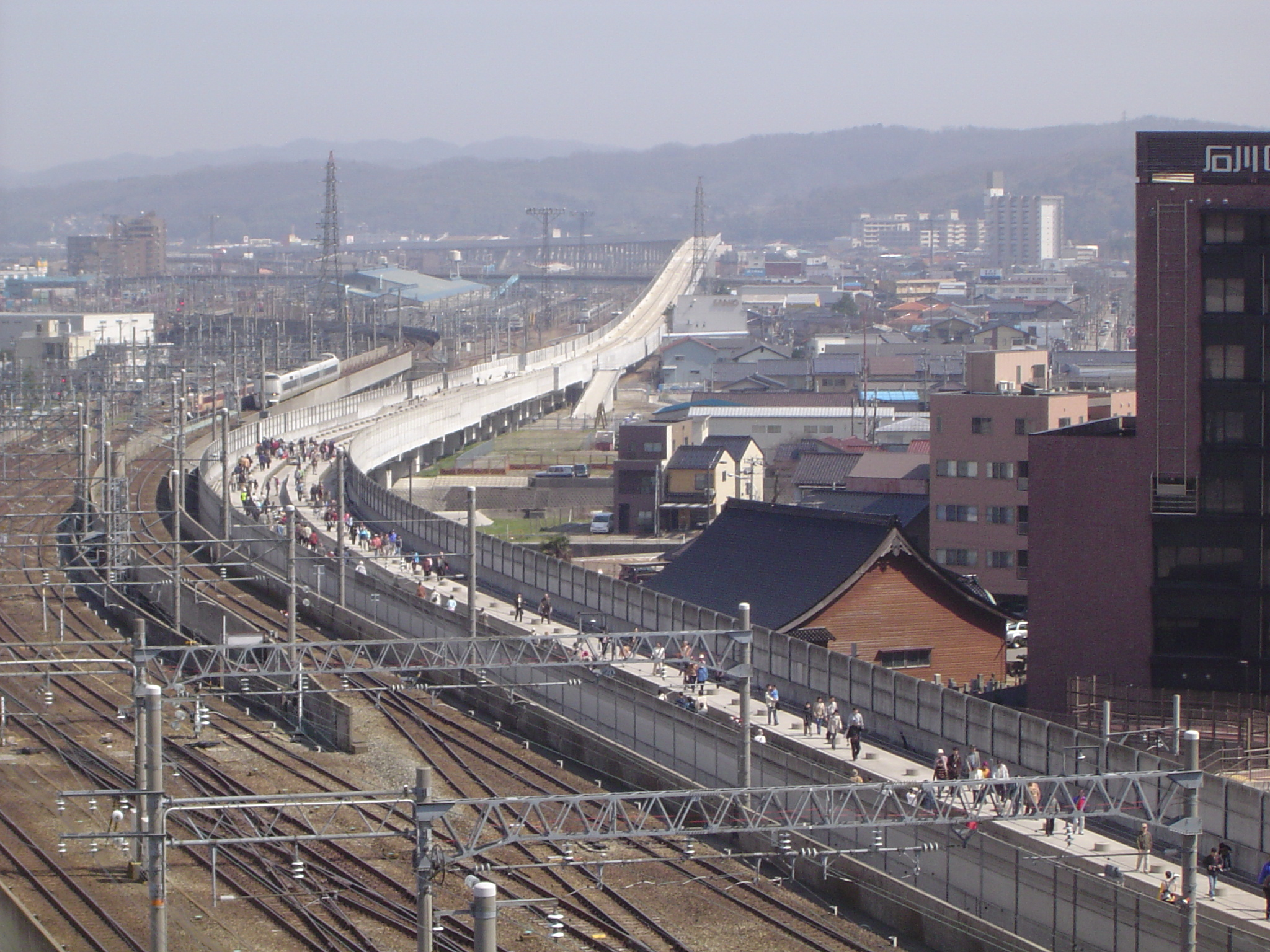
Construction of the Hokuriku Shinkansen extension near Kanazawa Station in March 2008

Construction of the extension from Nagano to Kanazawa was completed on 24 May 2014. When services commenced in March 2015, the travel time from Tokyo to Toyama was reduced to about two hours, with Kanazawa an additional 30 minutes away. Final permission to start construction to Fukui was granted in December 2011, with modification works to Fukui Station already in progress for several years in anticipation of the extension. The extension to Tsuruga was approved for construction on 30 June 2012, and opened on 16 March 2024. Beyond Jōetsumyōkō Station, the line is operated by West Japan Railway Company (JR West) instead of East Japan Railway Company (JR East).

=== Naming issue rises again ===
Many people speculated about and discussed what the line's operational name should be after Nagano–Kanazawa section is completed.

Nagano economic associations argued a sudden change in name will confuse customers, propose "Nagano–Hokuriku Shinkansen" to be used. In contrast government officials and economic associations in Hokuriku region defended the legal name, including statements such as "a just result should come after 3 prefectures striving for 40 years".

The section west of Jōetsumyōkō belongs to JR West, which did not state an opinion and used "Hokuriku Shinkansen" only.

On 2 October 2013, JR East announced formal line name will be Hokuriku Shinkansen (consistent with National Shinkansen Railway Development Act) and depicted as Hokuriku Shinkansen (via Nagano) to reflect its expansion into the region, resolving the naming issue.

=== Test-running ===
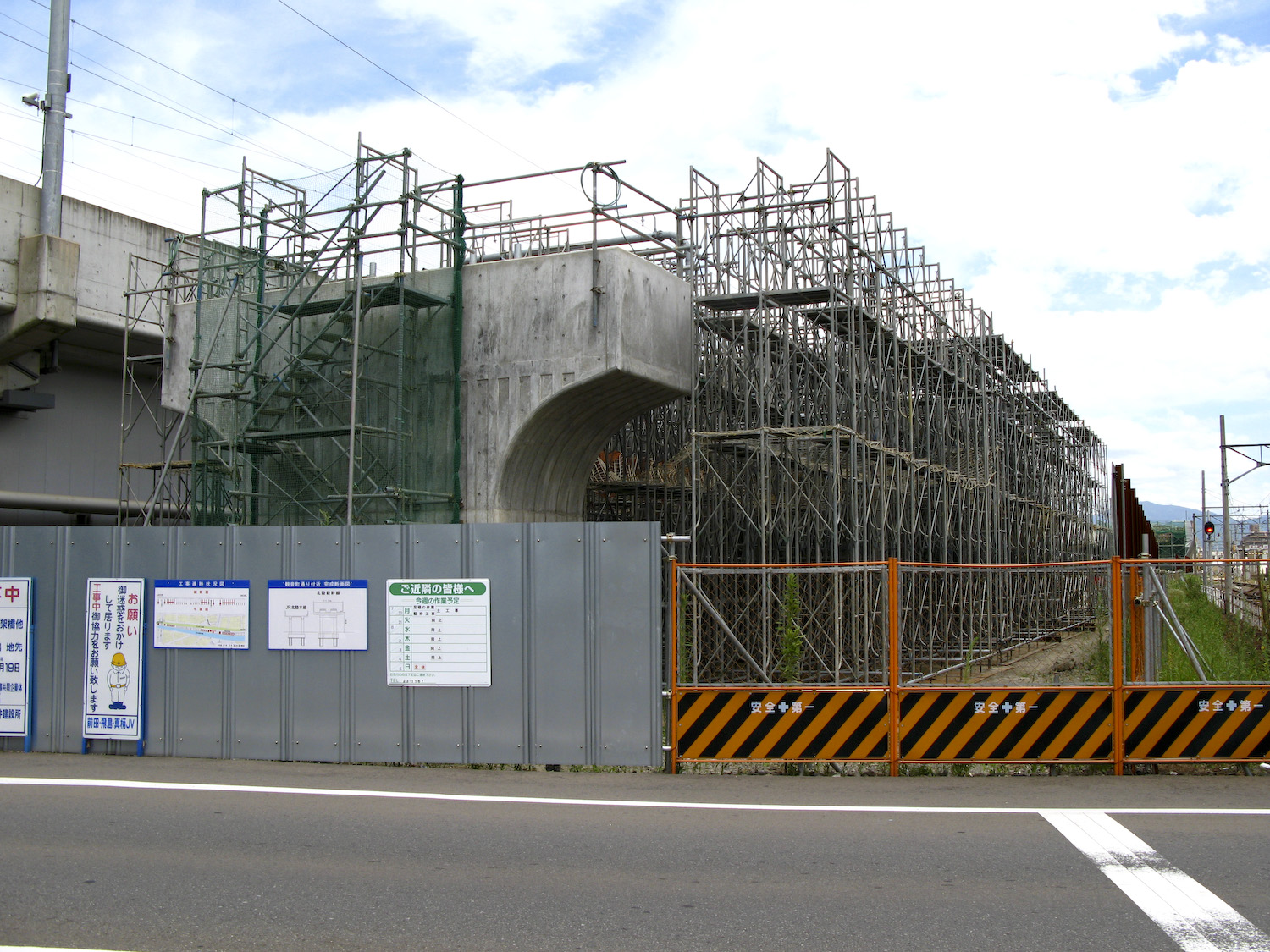
Construction of the Hokuriku Shinkansen near Fukui Station in August 2007

Test-running on the JR East section of the line between Nagano and Kurobe-Unazukionsen commenced on 1 December 2013, initially at low speeds using the "East i" test train. From 6 December of that year, test-running commenced using 10-car E2 series trainsets, with running speeds gradually increased to the full line speed of 260 km/h (160 mph). Test-running continued until the end of March 2014. Test-running on the entire line between Nagano and Kanazawa (Hakusan Depot) started on 1 August 2014, using the "East i" test train. Test-running using W7 series trains commenced on 5 August 2014, initially at low speed, on the JR West section between Kanazawa and Jōetsumyōkō.

=== Tsuruga extension ===
In the months preceding the opening, JR West conducted various low speed runs on the new Kanazawa-Tsuruga section using "East i" test trains on 23 September 2023. Runs using regular W7 series trainsets started on 26 September. Regular passenger service began on 16 March 2024, with ceremonies at both Tsuruga and Tōkyō from the respective presidents of JR West and JR East. The extension cost ¥1.67 trillion (US$15.22 billion) to build.

In accordance with the opening of the extension, the limited express service Thunderbird ended its service between Tsuruga and Kanazawa on 15 March 2024.

== Future plans ==
Routes considerered

The route of the final section from Tsuruga to Shin-Ōsaka was selected by the Liberal Democratic Party (LDP) and Japan Innovation Party (JIP), the parties forming Japan's ruling coalition, on 15 July 2026. The route will run from Tsuruga through Obama and eastern Kyoto Prefecture, bypassing Kyoto Station in favor of a new station near Katsuragawa Station, approximately 5 kilometres (3.1 mi) west of Kyoto Station. The underground station will be approximately 50 metres (160 ft) below ground and connected to central Kyoto by conventional railway services. From Katsuragawa, the line will continue to the Matsuiyamate area before reaching Shin-Ōsaka, where passengers will be able to transfer to the Tōkaidō Shinkansen, San'yō Shinkansen, and other services. The planned extension will be approximately 139 kilometres (86 mi) long and is expected to take about 26 years to complete. The route was originally selected as the Obama–Kyoto route in 2016, but its alignment within Kyoto was subsequently reconsidered. The project was estimated to cost ¥3.4 trillion (equivalent to ¥3.49 trillion or US$23.07 billion in 2024) in April 2023, although the estimate was expected to increase because of rising construction costs.

Before the current route was selected, several alternatives were considered. The Maibara Route would have connected Tsuruga directly to Maibara Station and used the Tōkaidō Shinkansen for through services to Kyoto and Osaka, but would have bypassed Obama and required trains to use the already congested Tōkaidō Shinkansen. The Obama Route would have followed a direct route from Tsuruga through Obama and Kameoka to Osaka, bypassing Kyoto, but serving the city was considered important for tourism and use of the line. A longer Maizuru Route was also proposed, adding a stop in Maizuru. The Kosei Route proposed upgrading the existing Kosei Line for Mini-Shinkansen operation through regauging or dual-gauging, or using Gauge Change Train (GCT) technology. GCT technology was also proposed as an interim means of providing through service west of Tsuruga before completion of the Shinkansen extension, but the GCT project was abandoned in 2018.

== Conventional lines running parallel to the Hokuriku Shinkansen ==
With the opening of the initial Nagano Shinkansen section in October 1997, the section of the conventional (narrow gauge) Shinetsu Main Line running along approximately the same route between Karuizawa and Shinonoi was transferred from the control of JR East to a newly established third-sector railway operating company, Shinano Railway, becoming the Shinano Railway Line.

With the opening of the Hokuriku Shinkansen extension north of Nagano on 14 March 2015, the conventional lines running along approximately the same route were transferred from the control of their respective JR owning companies to newly established third-sector railway operating companies funded primarily by the prefectural and municipal governments through which the lines pass. A total of 252.2 km (156.7 mi) of route between Nagano and Kanazawa was transferred to four separate operating companies, including 75.0 km (46.6 mi) of the Shinetsu Main Line between Nagano and Naoetsu, and 177.2 km (110.1 mi) of the Hokuriku Main Line between Naoetsu and Kanazawa. Details of the five third-sector operating companies and their respective lines are as shown below.

In 2019, it was decided that the section of the Hokuriku Main Line between Tsuruga and Fukui would be transferred to third-sector railway operating companies. Three years later in 2022, it was determined that the section would be split among two operators. The IR Ishikawa Railway would extend their operations from Kanazawa to Daishoji, while a new company, Hapi-Line Fukui, established during the preparation phase, would take over the section between Daishoji and Tsuruga. Hapi-Line Fukui took over the 84.3 km (52.4 mi) section of the Hokuriku Main Line on 16 March 2024.

Former line name	Former operator	Transferred	Section	Length (km)	New line name	New operator	Prefecture
Shinetsu Main Line	JR East	1 October 1997	Karuizawa–Shinonoi	65.1	Shinano Railway Line	Shinano Railway	Nagano
Shinetsu Main Line	JR East	14 March 2015	Nagano–Myōkō-Kōgen	37.3	Shinano Railway Kita-Shinano Line	Shinano Railway	Nagano
Shinetsu Main Line	JR East	14 March 2015	Myōkō-Kōgen–Naoetsu	37.7	Myōkō Haneuma Line	Echigo Tokimeki Railway	Niigata
Hokuriku Main Line	JR West	14 March 2015	Naoetsu–Ichiburi	59.3	Nihonkai Hisui Line	Echigo Tokimeki Railway	Niigata
Hokuriku Main Line	JR West	14 March 2015	Ichiburi–Kurikara	100.1	Ainokaze Toyama Railway Line	Ainokaze Toyama Railway	Toyama
Hokuriku Main Line	JR West	14 March 2015	Kurikara–Kanazawa	17.8	IR Ishikawa Railway Line	IR Ishikawa Railway	Ishikawa
Hokuriku Main Line	JR West	16 March 2024	Kanazawa–Daishōji	46.4	IR Ishikawa Railway Line	IR Ishikawa Railway	Ishikawa
Hokuriku Main Line	JR West	16 March 2024	Daishōji–Tsuruga	84.3	Hapi-Line Fukui Line	Hapi-Line Fukui	Fukui
