= Kagayaki =

Japanese high-speed Shinkansen train service

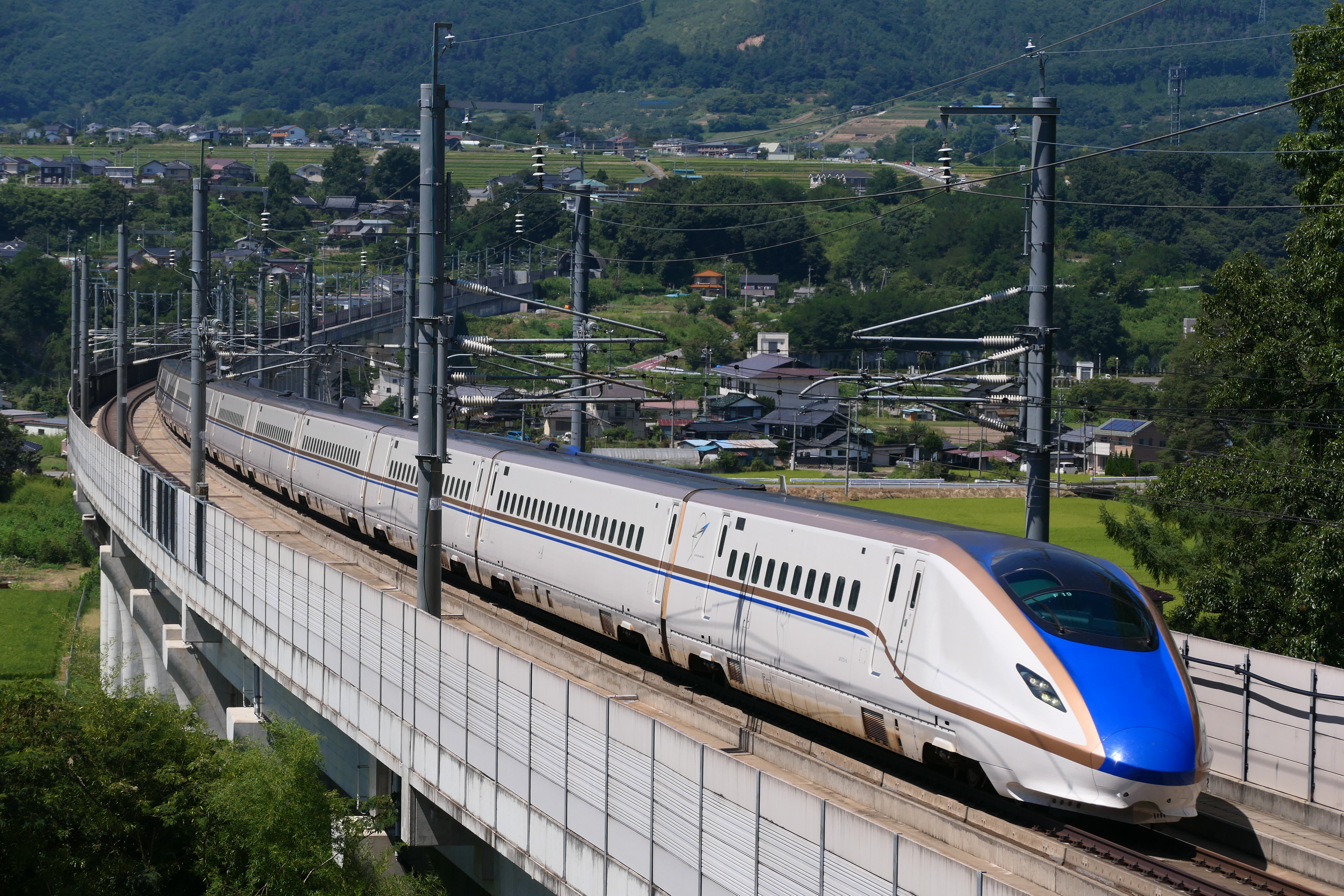
- E7 series set near Sakudaira Station, August 2020

Overview
- Service type: Shinkansen (Express)
- Status: Operational
- Locale: Hokuriku region, Japan
- First service: Limited express: 13 March 1988; Shinkansen: 14 March 2015
- Current operators: JR East; JR West

Route
- Termini: Tokyo; Tsuruga
- Stops: 12
- Distance travelled: 579.2 km (359.9 mi)
- Average journey time: 3 hours, 8 minutes
- Service frequency: 10 round trips daily
- Train number: 500–519
- Line used: Hokuriku Shinkansen

On-board services
- Classes: Ordinary, Green, Gran Class
- Disabled access: Yes, cars 7 and 11
- Seating arrangements: 2+3 (Ordinary car); 2+2 (Green car); 1+2 (Gran Class)
- Catering facilities: Trolley service

Technical
- Rolling stock: E7 and W7 series
- Track gauge: 1,435 mm (4 ft 8 1/2 in) standard gauge
- Electrification: Overhead line: 25 kV 50 Hz AC; 25 kV 60 Hz AC
- Operating speed: 275 km/h (171 mph)

The Kagayaki (Japanese: かがやき; lit. 'Radiance') is a express high-speed Shinkansen service on the Hokuriku Shinkansen jointly operated by the East Japan Railway Company (JR East) and the West Japan Railway Company (JR West). It operates between Tokyo and Tsuruga in Japan. The Shinkansen service was introduced on 14 March 2015, although the name Kagayaki was previously used for a limited express service operated by JR West from March 1988 to March 1997.

== Service outline ==
The Kagayaki is the fastest service operating on the Hokuriku Shinkansen line, with a total of ten daily return workings per direction (nine to Tsuruga, one to Kanazawa). Most services stop at only Omiya, Nagano, Toyama, Kanazawa and Fukui en route, with some services also stopping at Ueno, Komatsu, Kagaonsen, Awaraonsen and Echizen-Takefu. The service is capable of traveling at a maximum speed of 275 kilometres per hour (171 mph), with the fastest services between Tokyo and Tsuruga taking 3 hours, 8 minutes per direction.

== Rolling stock ==
- E7 series 12-car sets based at Nagano Depot, since 14 March 2015
- W7 series 12-car sets based at Hakusan Depot, since 14 March 2015

Kagayaki services are operated using JR East E7 series and JR West W7 series 12-car train sets based at Nagano and Hakusan depots respectively.

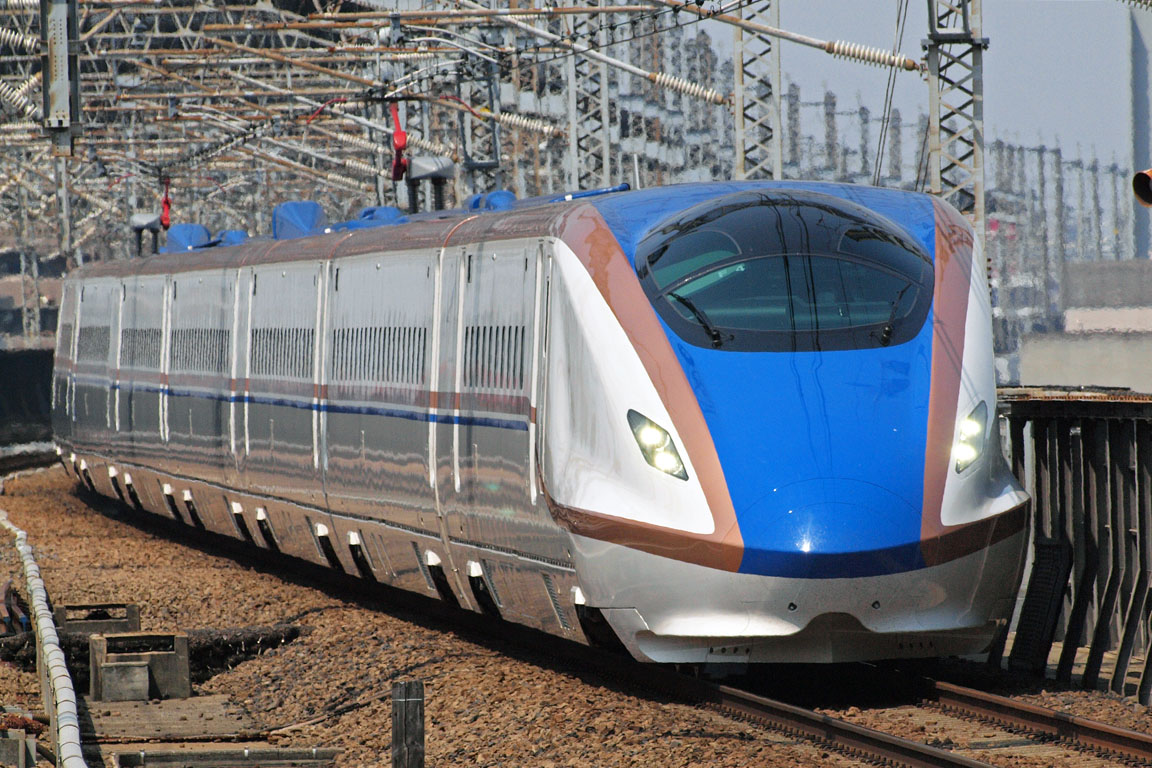
A JR East E7 series train

=== Pre-shinkansen ===
- 485 series 4/6-car EMU sets (March 1988 - March 1997)

== Formations ==
Kagayaki services use 12-car JR East E7 series and JR West W7 series sets, formed as follows, with car 1 at the Tokyo (southern) end. Cars 1 to 10 are ordinary-class cars with 2+3 seating, car 11 is a "Green" car with 2+2 seating, and car 12 is a "Gran Class" car with 2+1 seating. All seats on the Kagayaki service are reserved and non-smoking.

Car No.	1	2	3	4	5	6	7	8	9	10	11	12
Accommodation	Reserved	Reserved	Reserved	Reserved	Reserved	Reserved	Reserved	Reserved	Reserved	Reserved	Green	Gran Class
Facilities	Toilets		Toilets, phone		Toilets		Wheelchair space, accessible toilet, phone		Toilets		Wheelchair space, accessible toilet	Toilets

== History ==
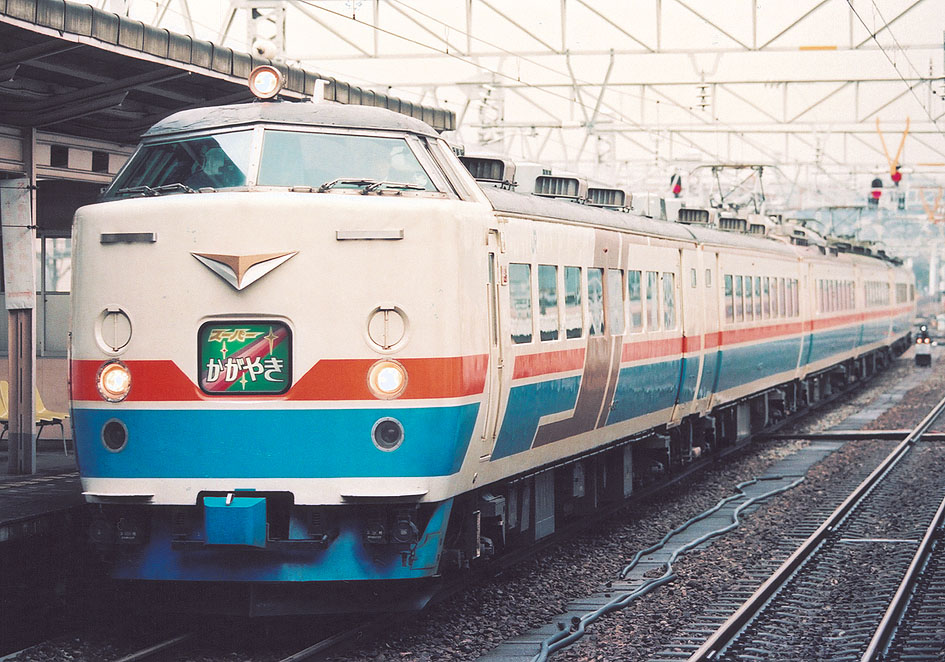
A JR West 485 series 6-car EMU on a Kagayaki service (date unknown)

The Kagayaki service was introduced on 13 March 1988 as a limited express service operating between Kanazawa and Nagaoka, to provide a connection travelling to and from Tokyo via the Joetsu Shinkansen. Services operated at a maximum speed of 120 km/h (75 mph), and stopped at Takaoka, Toyama, and Naoetsu only.

=== March 1988 – March 1990 ===
From their introduction in March 1988, services were normally formed of 4-car 485 series dual-voltage (AC/DC) electric multiple units (EMUs) based at Kanazawa Depot, as shown below, with car 1 at the Kanazawa end.

Car No.	1	2	3	4
Numbering	KuHa 481	MoHa 484	MoHa 485	KuHa 481
Accommodation	Reserved	Reserved	Reserved	Reserved

=== March 1990 – March 1991 ===
From March 1990, services were normally formed of 6-car Kanazawa-based 485 series EMUs, as shown below, with car 1 at the Kanazawa end. From January 1991, a "Green" (first class) car was added to the formations.

Car No.	1	2	3	4	5	6
Numbering	KuHa 481	MoHa 484	MoHa 485	MoHa 484	MoHa 485	KuHa 481
Accommodation	Reserved	Reserved	Reserved	Reserved	Reserved	Reserved
Facilities	Toilet	Vending machine	Toilet	Toilet	Toilet	Phone

=== March 1991 – March 1992 ===
From March 1991, services were normally formed of 6-car Kanazawa-based 485 series EMUs with a Green (first class) car, as shown below, with car 1 at the Kanazawa end.

Car No.	1	2	3	4	5	6
Numbering	KuRo 481	MoHa 484	MoHa 485	MoHa 484	MoHa 485	KuHa 481
Accommodation	Green	Reserved	Reserved	Reserved	Reserved	Reserved
Facilities	Toilet	Vending machine	Toilet	Toilet	Toilet	Phone

=== March 1992 – March 1997 ===
From March 1992, services were normally formed of 6-car Kanazawa-based 485 series EMUs, as shown below, with car 1 at the Kanazawa end and car 6 designated as a non-reserved seating car. Car 1 was divided into smoking and no-smoking sections. At busy periods, trains often ran as 8-car formations.

Car No.	1	2	3	4	5	6
Numbering	KuRo 481	MoHa 484	MoHa 485	MoHa 484	MoHa 485	KuHa 481
Accommodation	Green	Reserved	Reserved	Reserved	Reserved	Non-reserved
Facilities	Toilet, phone	Vending machine	Toilet	Toilet	Toilet	

Kagayaki limited express services were discontinued from 23 March 1997, with the opening of the Hokuhoku Line and the introduction of new Hakutaka services connecting with the Joetsu Shinkansen at Echigo-Yuzawa.

=== Shinkansen Kagayaki (March 2015 – ) ===
From 14 March 2015, the name Kagayaki was reinstated for use on limited-stop services operating between Tokyo and Kanazawa following the opening of the Hokuriku Shinkansen beyond Nagano. From the start of the revised timetable on 16 March 2024, with the opening of the Hokuriku Shinkansen line extension to Tsuruga, nine out of the ten daily return workings began to operate as far as Tsuruga, with one daily return working beginning and ending at Kanazawa.

== See also ==
- List of named passenger trains of Japan
