= Annaka-Haruna Station =

High Speed Rail station in Annaka, Gunma prefecture, Japan

Annaka-Haruna Station 安中榛名駅
- The station entrance in March 2024

General information
- Location: 2552-5 Higashi-kamiasama, Annaka-shi, Gunma-ken 379-0102; Japan
- Coordinates: 36.362403°N 138.849598°E
- Operator: JR East
- Line: Hokuriku Shinkansen
- Distance: 18.5 km (11.5 mi) from Takasaki
- Platforms: 2 side platforms
- Tracks: 2

Construction
- Structure type: At grade

Other information
- Status: Staffed (Midori no Madoguchi)
- Website: Official website

History
- Opened: 1 October 1997; 28 years ago

Passengers
- FY2019: 284 daily

Services
| Preceding station | JR East | Following station |
|---|---|---|
| Karuizawa towards Jōetsumyōkō | Hokuriku Shinkansen Hakutaka | Takasaki towards Tokyo |
| Karuizawa towards Nagano | Hokuriku Shinkansen Asama | Takasaki towards Tokyo |
Location
- Location within Gunma Prefecture Location within Japan

Annaka-Haruna Station (安中榛名駅, Annaka-Haruna-eki) is a railway station on the high-speed Hokuriku Shinkansen line in the city of Annaka, Gunma, Japan, operated by East Japan Railway Company (JR East).

== Lines ==
Annaka-Haruna Station is served by the Hokuriku Shinkansen high-speed line between Tokyo and Kanazawa via Nagano, but only a small number of Asama services stop at the station (approximately one train every two hours during the daytime). One evening Hakutaka service also stops at this station. It is not served by any other lines. The station is located 18.5 kilometers from Takasaki and 123.5 kilometers from the starting point of the line at Tokyo.

== Station layout ==
The elevated station consists of two side platforms serving two tracks. The station has a Midori no Madoguchi staffed ticket office.

=== Platforms ===
| 1 | ■ Hokuriku Shinkansen | for Nagano, Toyama, and Kanazawa |
| 2 | ■ Hokuriku Shinkansen | for Takasaki, Ōmiya, and Tokyo |

== History ==
The station opened on 1 October 1997.

== Passenger statistics ==
In fiscal 2019, the station was used by an average of 284 passengers daily (boarding passengers only). The passenger figures for previous years are as shown below.

| Fiscal year | Daily average |
|---|---|
| 2000 | 169 |
| 2005 | 234 |
| 2010 | 252 |
| 2015 | 272 |

== Surrounding area ==
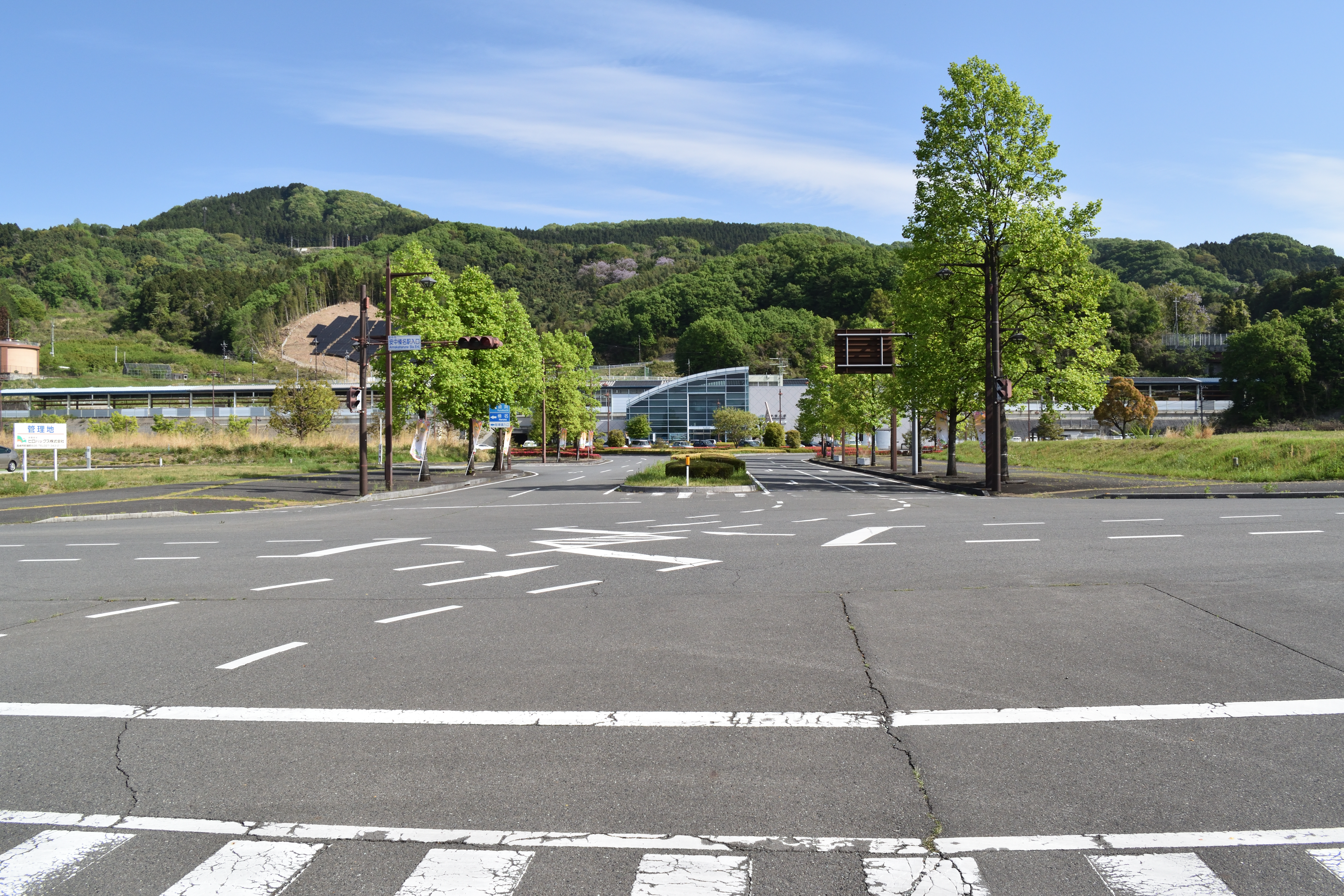
The station in 2017, showing the rural surroundings

- Annaka Asama Elementary School

== See also ==
- List of railway stations in Japan
