= Tsurugi (train) =

Japanese high-speed Shinkansen train service

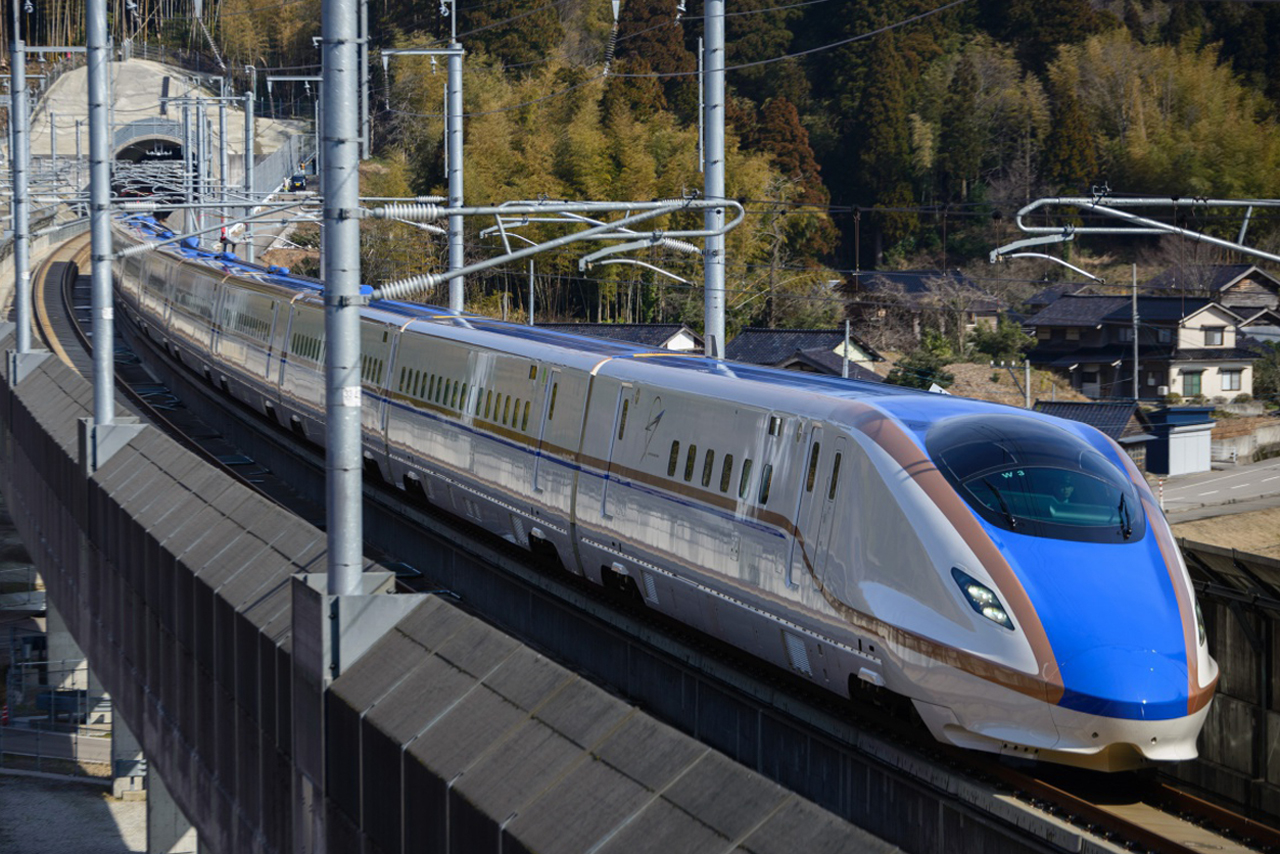
- W7 series set near Sugise Tunnel (February 2015)

Overview
- Service type: Shinkansen (Local)
- Status: Operational
- Locale: Hokuriku region, Japan
- First service: Limited express: 1 October 1961; Shinkansen: 14 March 2015
- Current operator: JR West
- Former operator: Japanese National Railways

Route
- Termini: Toyama; Tsuruga
- Service frequency: 27 round trips daily
- Train number: 1–64
- Line used: Hokuriku Shinkansen

On-board services
- Classes: Ordinary, Green, Gran Class
- Disabled access: Yes, cars 7 and 11
- Seating arrangements: 2+3 (Ordinary car); 2+2 (Green car); 1+2 (Gran Class)

Technical
- Rolling stock: E7 and W7 series
- Track gauge: 1,435 mm (4 ft 8 1/2 in) standard gauge
- Electrification: Overhead line: 25 kV 50 Hz AC; 25 kV 60 Hz AC
- Operating speed: 260 km/h (160 mph)

The Tsurugi (Japanese: つるぎ; lit. 'sword') is a local high-speed Shinkansen service on the Hokuriku Shinkansen operated by the West Japan Railway Company (JR West). It operates between Toyama and Tsuruga in Japan. The Shinkansen service was introduced on 14 March 2015, although the name Tsurugi was previously used for a limited-express overnight "Blue Train" sleeping car service operated by Japanese National Railways (JNR) and later by JR West from 1961 until 1994. The service is named after Mount Tsurugi.

== Service outline ==
As of 16 March 2024, 25 return Tsurugi services operate daily as a shuttle between Toyama and Tsuruga, with some services stopping at every station en route. Trains operate at a maximum speed of 260 km/h (160 mph).

== Rolling stock ==
- E7 series 12-car sets based at Nagano Depot, since 14 March 2015
- W7 series 12-car sets based at Hakusan Depot, since 14 March 2015

Tsurugi services are operated using JR East E7 series and JR West W7 series 12-car train sets based at Nagano and Hakusan depots respectively.

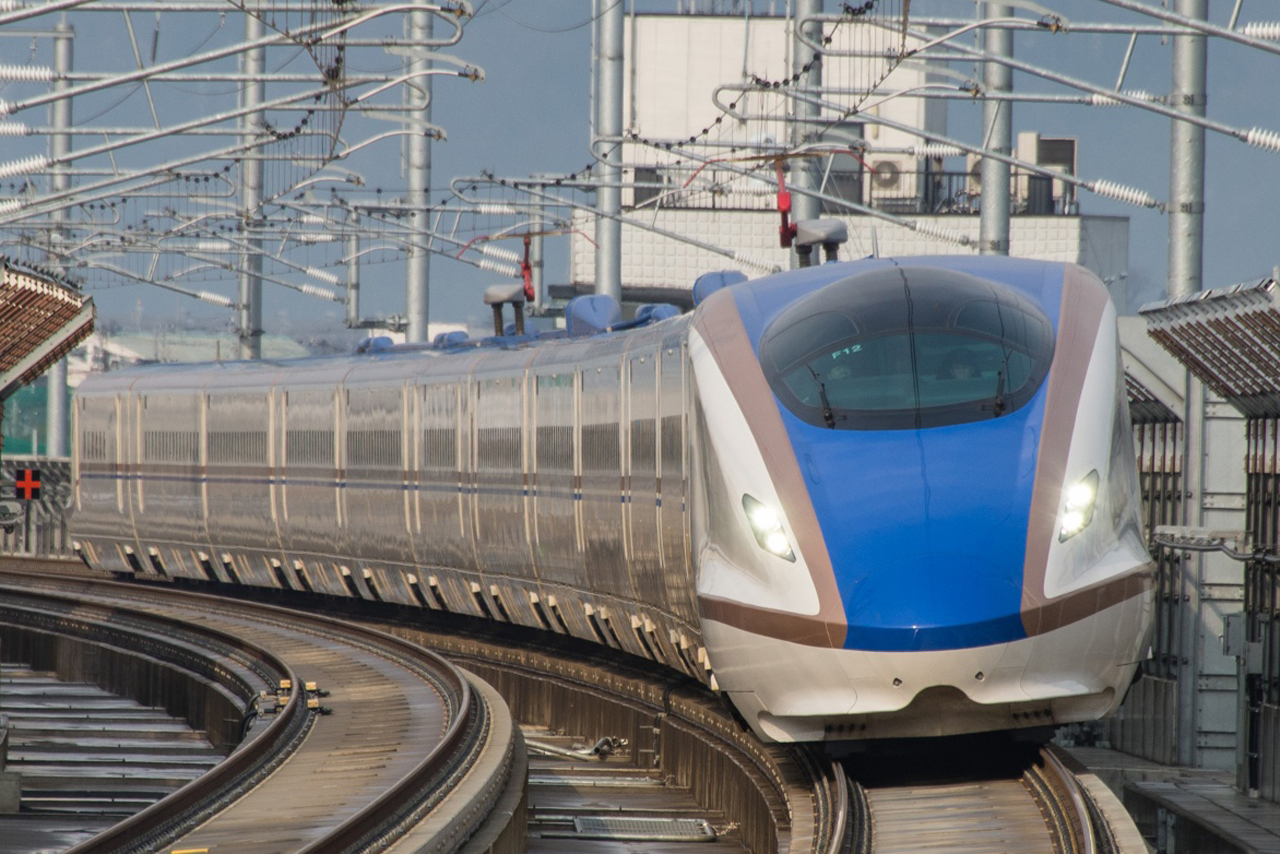
JR East E7 series train set F12 on the Hokuriku Shinkansen

== History ==
=== Sleeping car Tsurugi ===
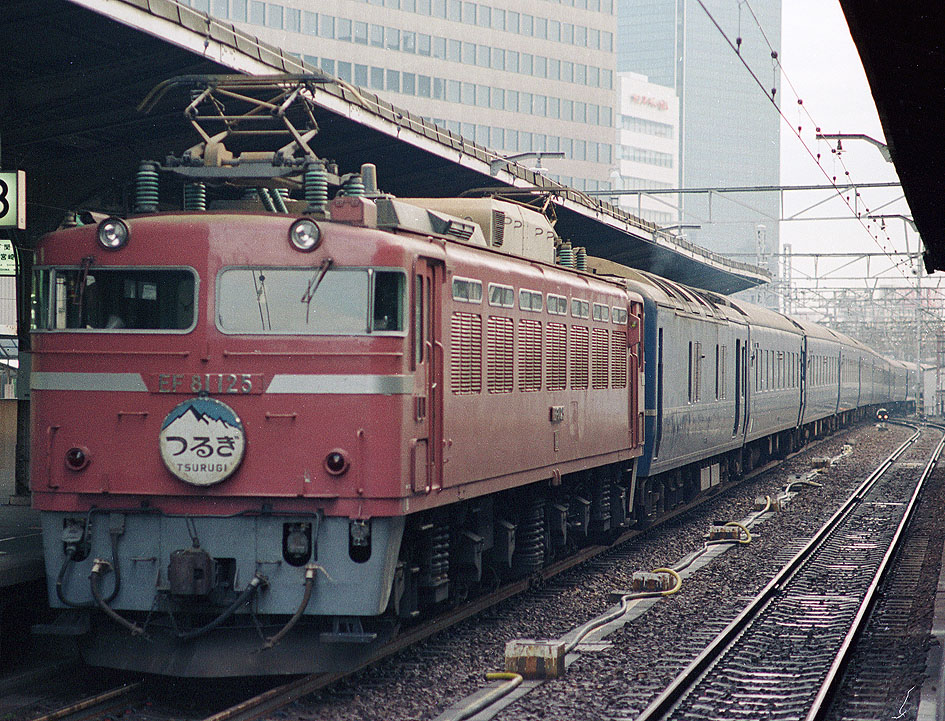
A Class EF81 electric locomotive at the head of a Tsurugi sleeping car service

The Tsurugi service was first introduced on 1 October 1961 as a limited express service operating between Osaka and Niigata. Regular Tsurugi services were discontinued from the start of the revised timetable on 4 December 1994.

=== Shinkansen Tsurugi ===
From 14 March 2015, the name Tsurugi was reinstated for use on all-stations shuttle services operating between Toyama and Kanazawa following the opening of the Hokuriku Shinkansen beyond Nagano. Services were extended to Tsuruga when the Hokuriku Shinkansen was extended on 16 March 2024.

== See also ==
- List of named passenger trains of Japan
