= Kitaguni =

Former overnight train service (1961–2013)

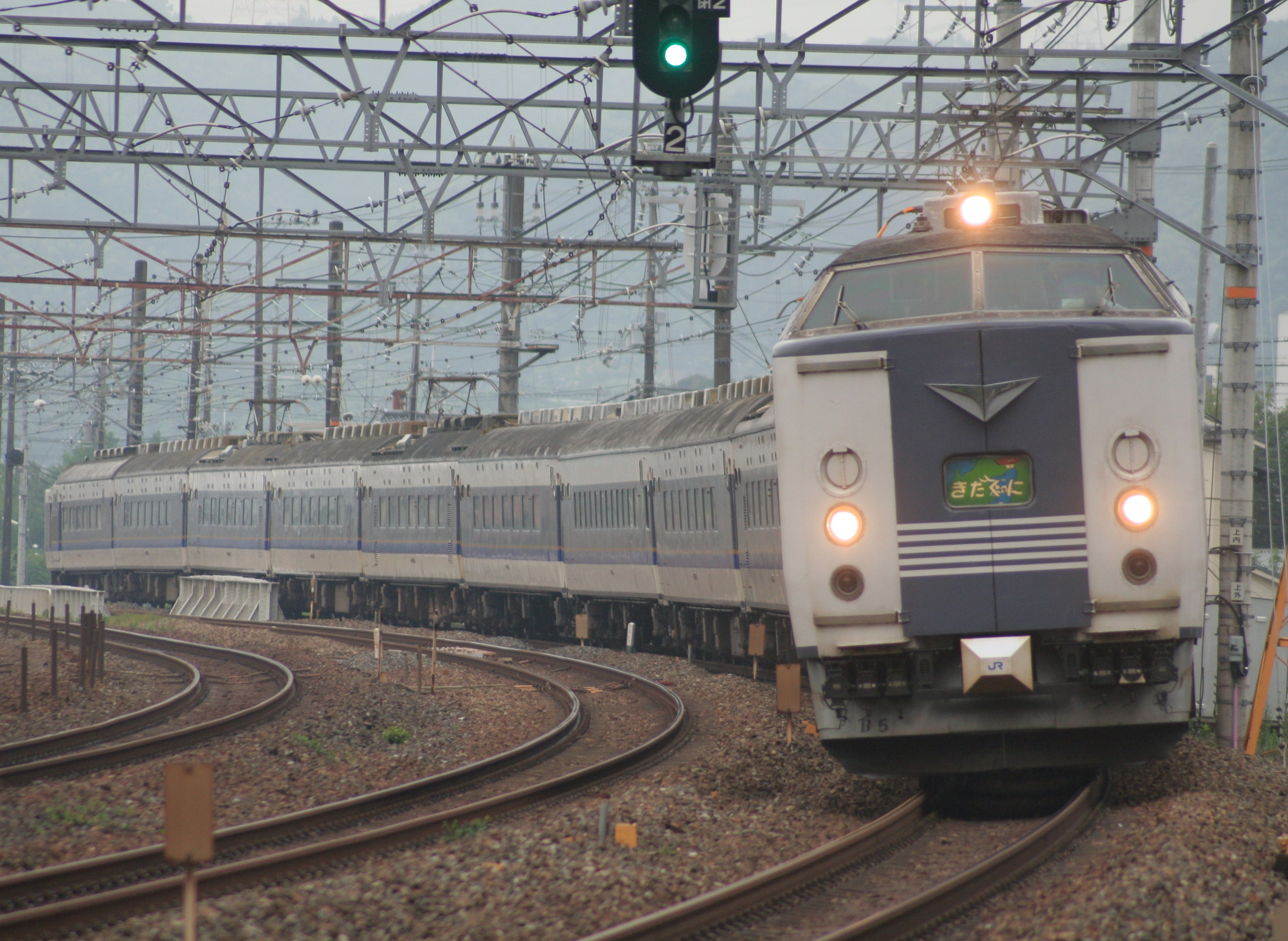
- A 583 series EMU train on a Kitaguni express in August 2010

Overview
- Service type: Express
- Status: Discontinued
- Locale: Japan
- First service: 1 October 1961
- Last service: January 2013
- Current operator(s): JR West
- Former operator(s): JNR

Route
- Termini: Osaka; Niigata
- Average journey time: 8-9 hours

Technical
- Rolling stock: 583 series EMUs
- Track gauge: 1,067 mm (3 ft 6 in)
- Electrification: 1,500 V DC, 20 kV AC

The Kitaguni (きたぐに) was an overnight train service that operated in Japan from October 1961 until January 2013. Operated by West Japan Railway Company (JR West), it ran between Niigata and Osaka, taking approximately nine hours northbound and eight hours southbound. Reduced to seasonal operations in March 2012, the service was officially discontinued in January 2013.

== Route ==
The Kitaguni ran on the following lines:

JR West

- Kyoto Line (Tōkaidō Main Line): Osaka - Kyoto
- Biwako Line (Tōkaidō Main Line/Hokuriku Line): Kyoto - Nagahama
- Hokuriku Line: Nagahama - Naoetsu

JR East

- Shinetsu Line: Naoetsu - Niigata

== Service pattern ==
The southbound train originated at Niigata Station at 22:55, arriving in Osaka at 06:49.

The northbound service left Osaka at 23:27, terminating at Niitsu Station at 08:10. It then continued as a local train for the final 15-minutes to Niigata.

Major stops along the Kitaguni route included Shin-Osaka, Kyoto, Maibara, Tsuruga, Fukui, Kanazawa, Toyama, Itoigawa, Naoetsu, Nagaoka and Higashi-Sanjō

== Rolling stock ==
The Kitaguni used dedicated 581/583 series EMU trains consisting of reserved accommodation only.

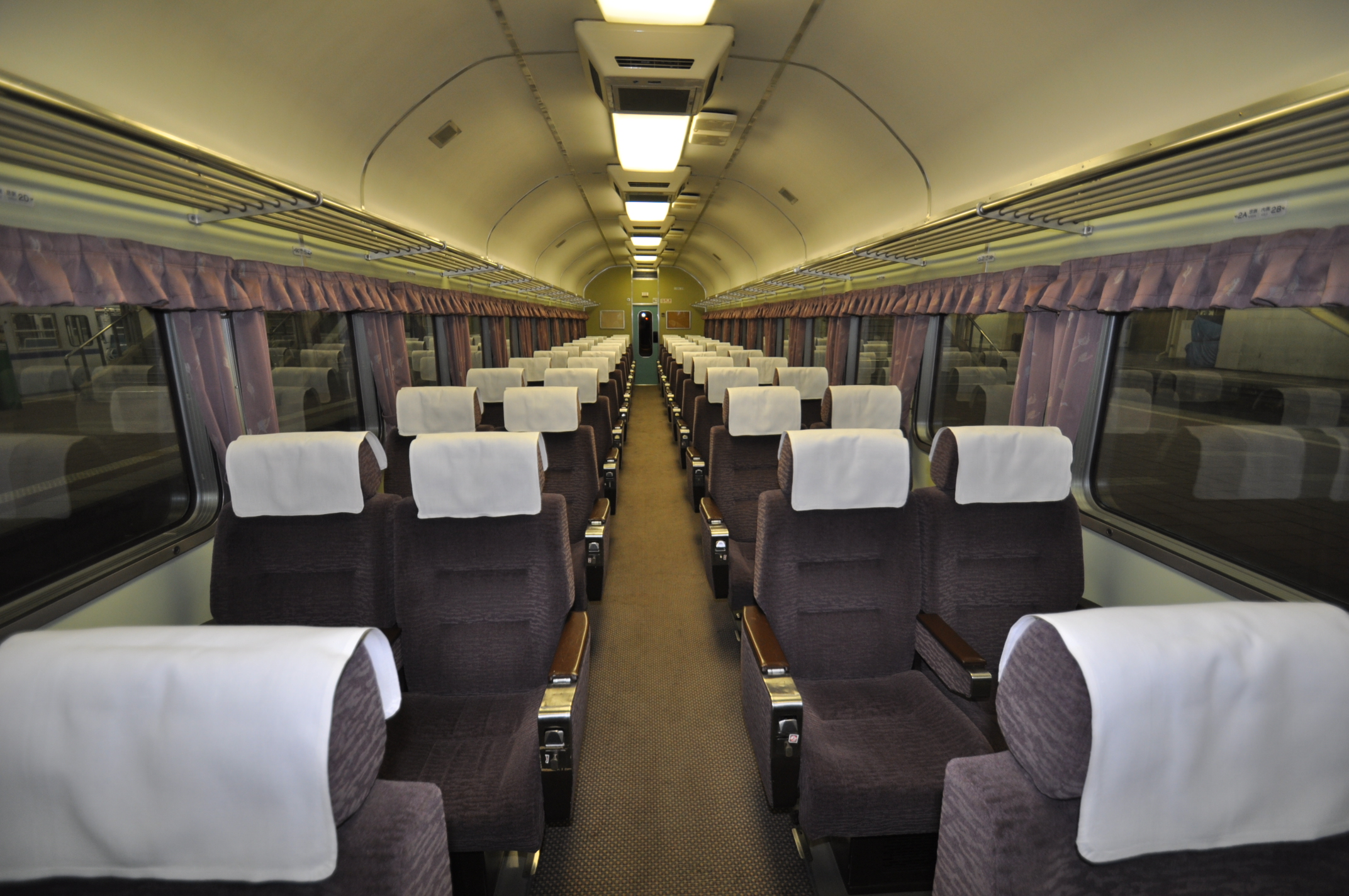
The interior of a Saro 581 Green seating car in 2010

== Fares ==
Kitaguni Green Car reserved seat ticket

A flat fee was charged for type "A" and "B" reserved sleeping car accommodation, regardless of starting or ending location, while Green Car (first class) reserved accommodation rates were based on distance. In the final days of the train's operations, accommodation rates ranged from about ¥6,000 for a type "B" berth to about ¥10,000 for a type "A" berth. A Green Car seat covering the entire distance from Osaka to Niigata cost ¥5,150.

The other fares, the basic fare and express fare, were based on distance. For tourists using the Japan Rail Pass, the basic fare did not have to be paid.

== History ==
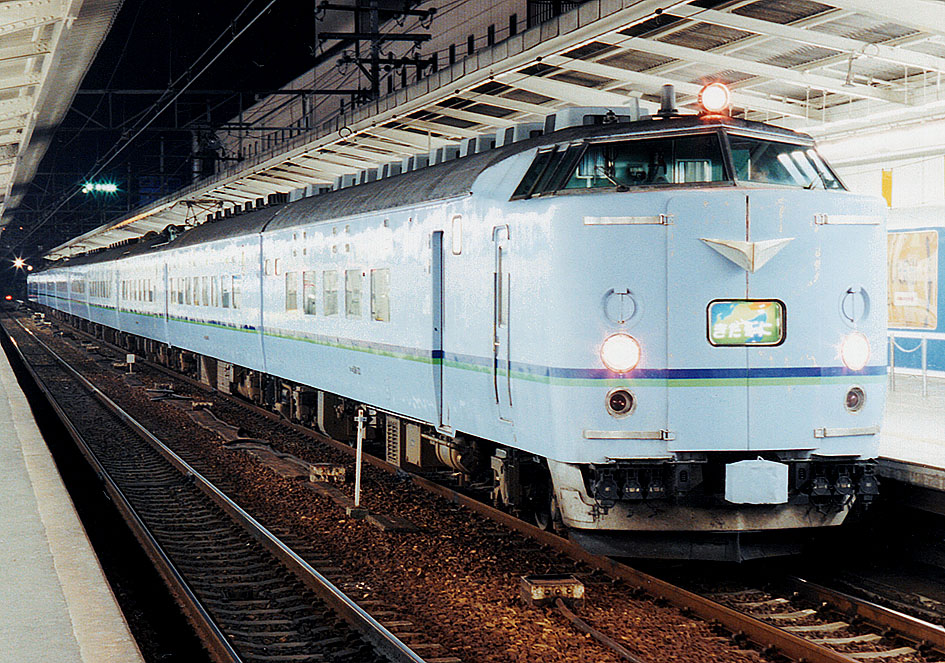
A 583 series Kitaguni service in 1994

The Kitaguni service first ran on 1 October 1961, as an express between Kanazawa and Niigata. From 1 October 1968, the service was extended to operate between Osaka and Aomori.

From the start of the 17 March 2012 timetable revision, regular operations of the Kitaguni were discontinued, with services operating during busy seasonal periods only.

On 31 January 2013, JR West announced that the Kitaguni service had been formally discontinued following the seasonal runs over the New Year period.

== See also ==
- List of named passenger trains of Japan
