= 419 series =

Japanese train type

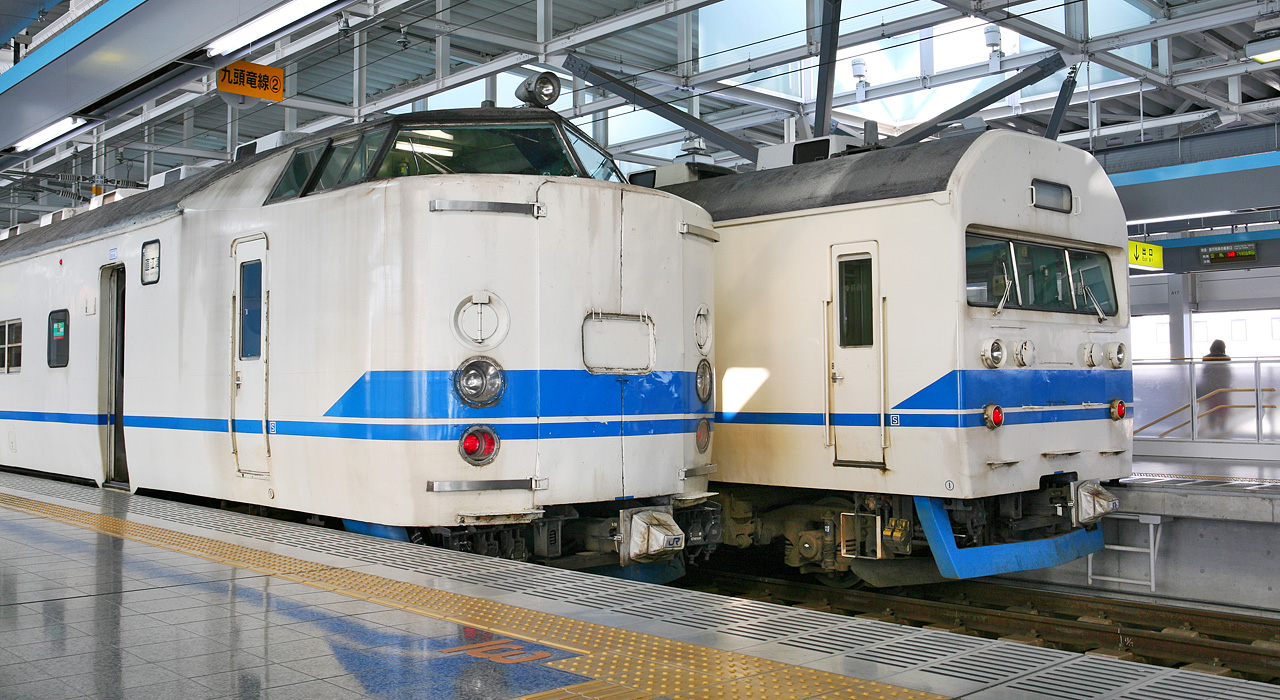
- 419 series trains at Fukui station, showing the differing cab end designs, April 2008
- In service: 1985–2011
- Manufacturer: JNR
- Constructed: 1967-1972 (as 583 series)
- Refurbished: 1985 (converted from 583 series)
- Scrapped: 2006–2012
- Number built: 45 vehicles (15 sets)
- Number in service: None
- Number preserved: None
- Formation: 3 cars per trainset
- Fleet numbers: D01-D15
- Operators: JNR (1985–1987); JR-West (1987–2011)
- Depot: Fukui

Specifications
- Car body construction: Steel
- Car length: 20,500 mm (67 ft 3 in)
- Width: 2,950 mm (9 ft 8 in)
- Doors: 2 per side
- Maximum speed: 100 km/h (60 mph)
- Traction system: Resistor control
- Electric system: 1,500 V DC / 20 kV AC (50/60 Hz)
- Current collection: overhead catenary
- Track gauge: 1,067 mm (3 ft 6 in)

The 419 series (419系, 419-kei) was an electric multiple unit (EMU) train type introduced in 1985 by Japanese National Railways (JNR), and later operated by West Japan Railway Company (JR-West) on local services along the Japan Sea coast of Japan until March 2011. They were converted from former 583 series sleeping car EMUs in the 1980s.

== Formations ==
=== Sets D01-D09 ===
KuMoHa 419 + MoHa 418 + KuHa 418

(MoHa 418 cars each had one PS16 pantograph.)

=== Sets D10-D15 ===
KuMoHa 419 + MoHa 418 + KuHa 419

(MoHa 418 cars each had one PS16 pantograph.)

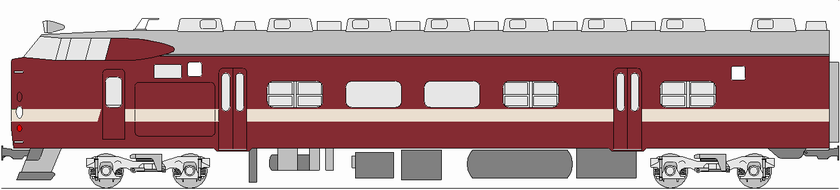
KuHa419

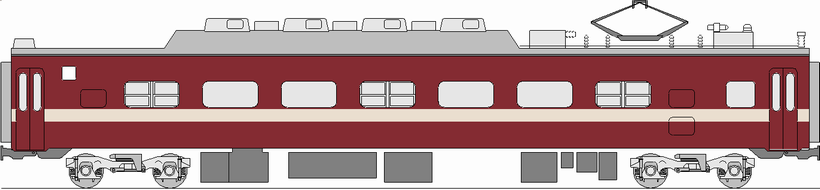
MoHa418

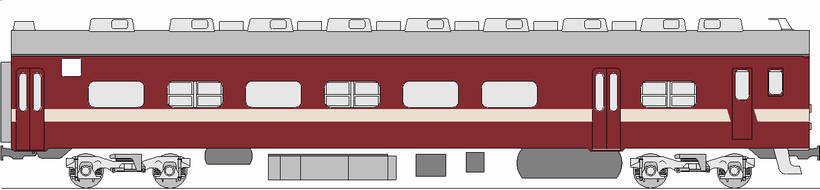
KuMoHa419

== Interior ==
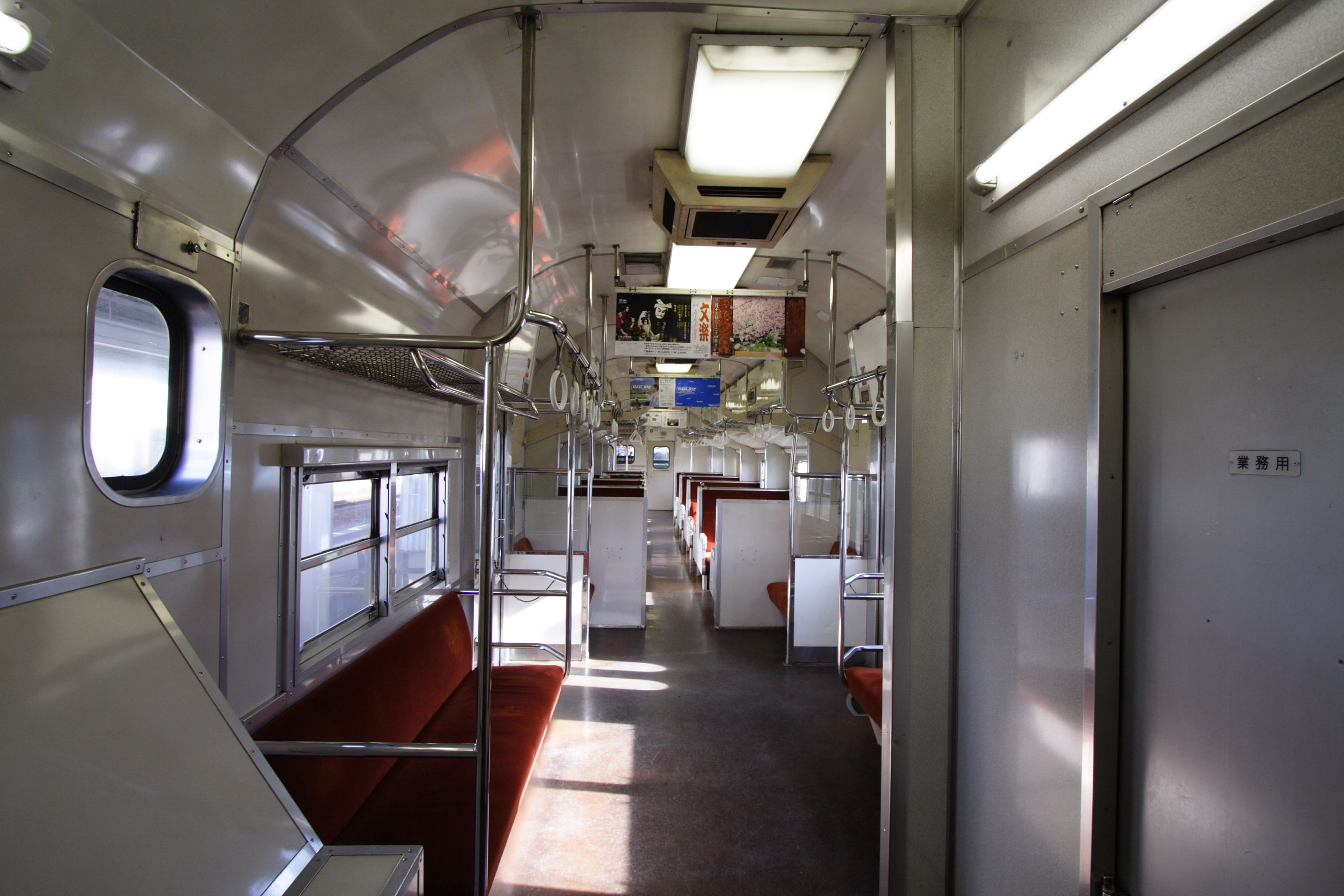

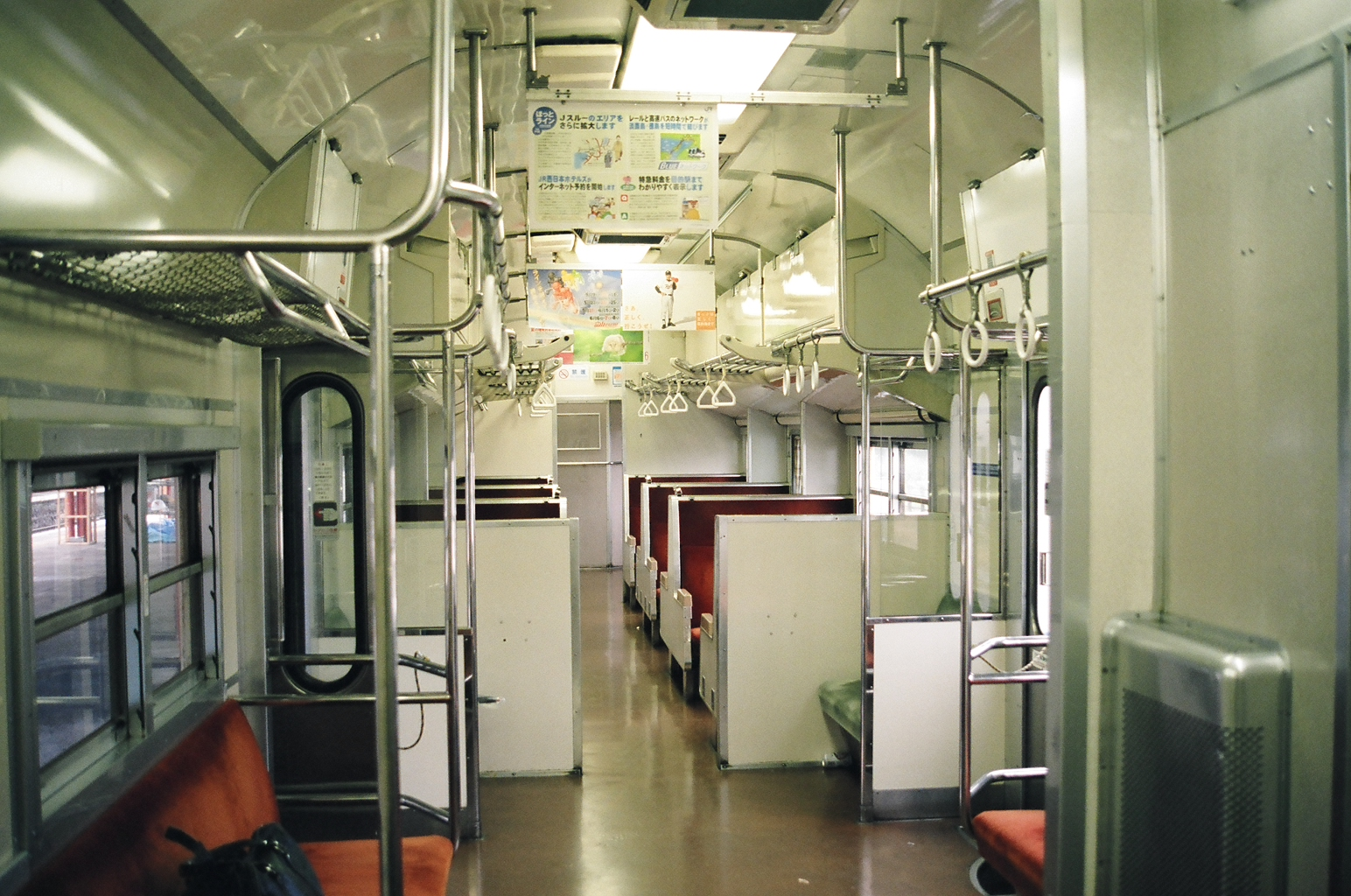

== History ==
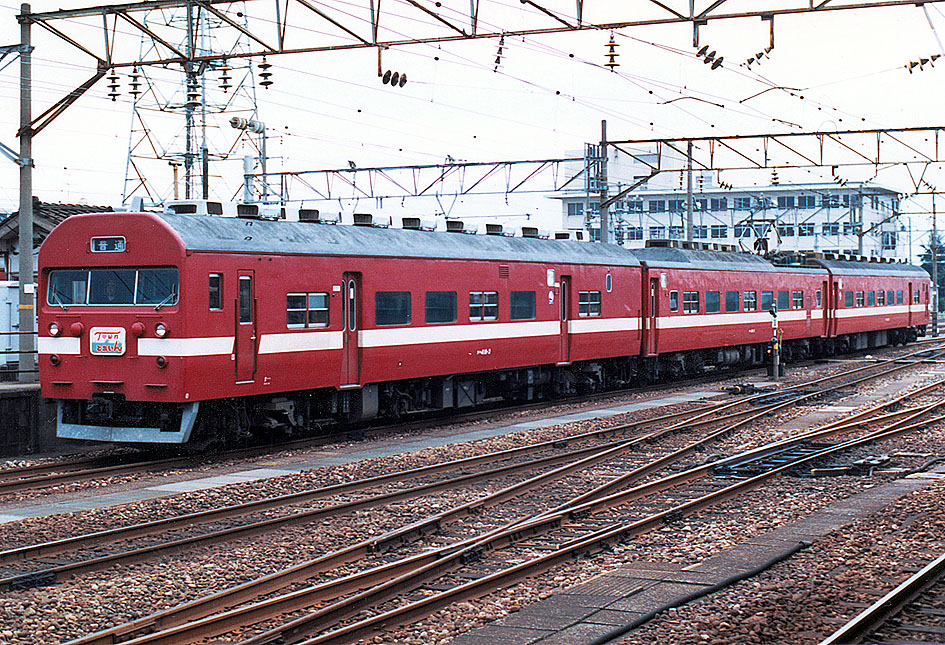
419 series in original JNR livery in the late 1980s

The 419 series sets were converted from surplus former 583 series sleeping car EMUs and entered service from the start of the revised timetable in March 1985.

Following the introduction of new 521 series EMUs in late 2006, two sets, D10 and D13, were withdrawn in March 2007. The remaining sets were finally withdrawn on 11 March 2011.

KuHa 418-1 from set D01 was preserved at a locomotive scrapping facility in Takaoka starting in 2012; it was removed from display around November 2021 and subsequently scrapped.

== See also ==
- 715 series, similar EMUs used in the north-east Japan and northern Kyushu
- NS Intercity Materieel, EMUs with a similar cab design used in the Netherlands
