= 715 series =

Japanese train type

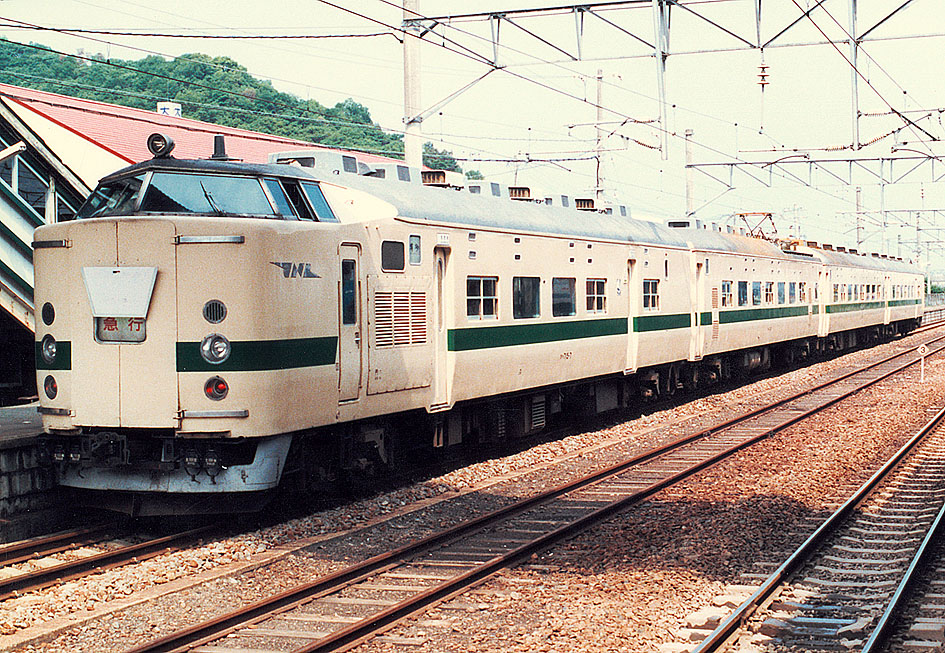
- 715-0 series train at Hizen-Yamaguchi Station, 1987
- In service: 1984–1998
- Manufacturer: JNR
- Constructed: 1967–1972 (as 581 / 583 series)
- Refurbished: 1984–1985 (converted from 581 / 583 series)
- Number built: 108 vehicles (27 sets)
- Number in service: None
- Number preserved: 1 vehicle
- Successor: 701 series, 813 series
- Formation: 4 cars per trainset
- Operators: JNR (1984–1987); JR East, JR Kyushu (1987–1998)
- Depots: Minami-Fukuoka, Sendai

Specifications
- Car body construction: Steel
- Car length: 20,500 mm (67 ft 3 in)
- Width: 2,950 mm (9 ft 8 in)
- Doors: 2 per side
- Maximum speed: 100 km/h (60 mph)
- Traction system: Resistor control
- Electric systems: 20 kV AC (60 Hz) (715-0 series); 20 kV AC (50/60 Hz) (715-1000 series)
- Current collection: Overhead catenary
- Track gauge: 1,067 mm (3 ft 6 in)

The 715 series (715系) was an electric multiple unit (EMU) train type introduced in February 1984 by Japanese National Railways (JNR), and later operated by East Japan Railway Company (JR East) and Kyushu Railway Company (JR Kyushu) on local services in Japan. They were converted from former 581/583 series sleeping car EMUs.

== Operations ==
12 4-car 715-0 series sets converted from former 581 series EMU cars were introduced from February 1984 on Nagasaki Main Line and Sasebo Line local services in Kyushu alongside new 713 series EMUs.

15 4-car 715-1000 series sets converted from former 581/583 series EMU cars were introduced from March 1985 on Tōhoku Main Line local services in the Sendai area.

== Formations ==
=== 715-0 series ===
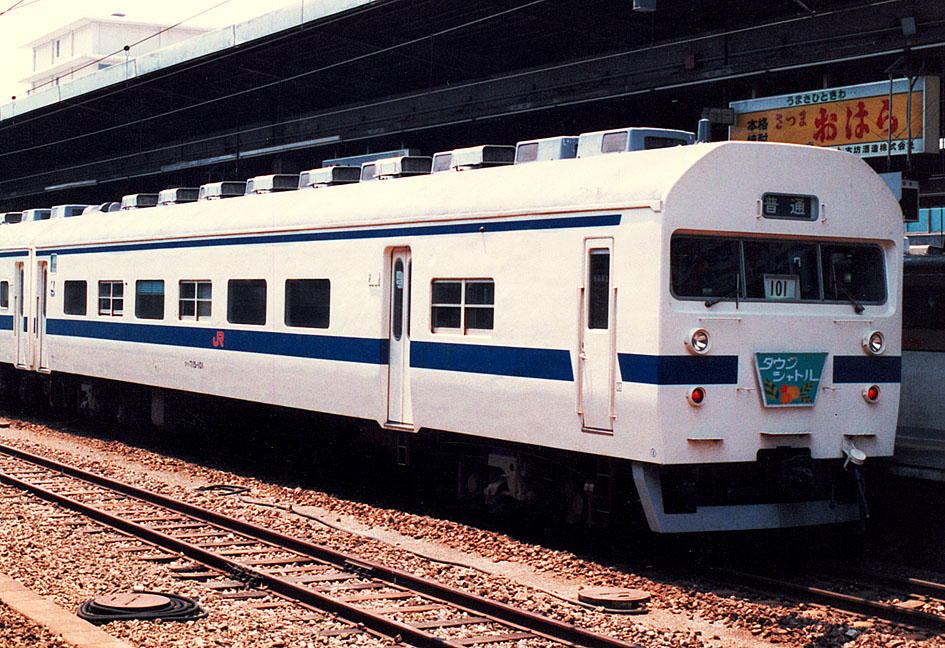
KuHa 715-101 in JR Kyushu livery with blue bodyside stripe

The 12 JR Kyushu 4-car sets based at Minami-Fukuoka Depot were formed as shown below. Sets N_{M}101–110 had a KuHa 715-100 converted cab car at one end, while sets N_{M}111–112 had converted cab cars at both ends.

==== Sets N_{M}101–110 ====
| Designation | Tc | M | M' | Tc' |
| Numbering | KuHa 715-100 | MoHa 715 | MoHa 714 | KuHa 715 |

==== Sets N_{M}111–112 ====
| Designation | Tc | M | M' | Tc' |
| Numbering | KuHa 715-100 | MoHa 715 | MoHa 714 | KuHa 714 |

The MoHa 714 cars were each fitted with one pantograph.

=== 715-1000 series ===
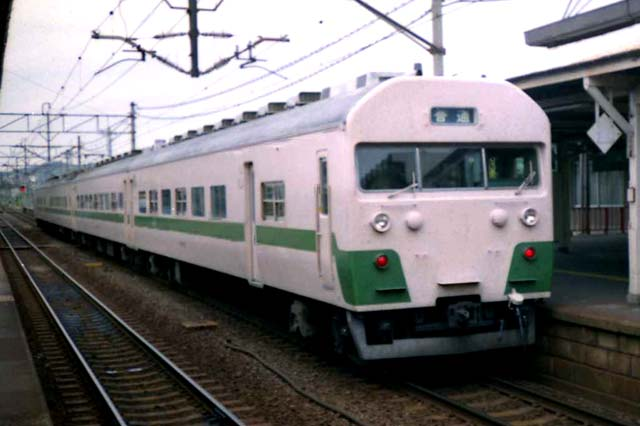
JR East 715-1000 series set

The 15 JR East 4-car sets (N1–15) based at Sendai Depot were formed as follows.

| Designation | Tc | M | M' | Tc' |
| Numbering | KuHa 715-1100 | MoHa 715-1000 | MoHa 714-1000 | KuHa 715-1000 |

The MoHa 714 cars were each fitted with one pantograph.

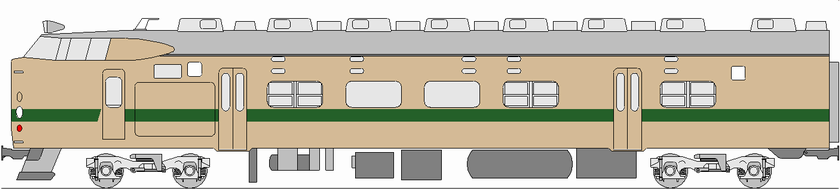
KuHa715

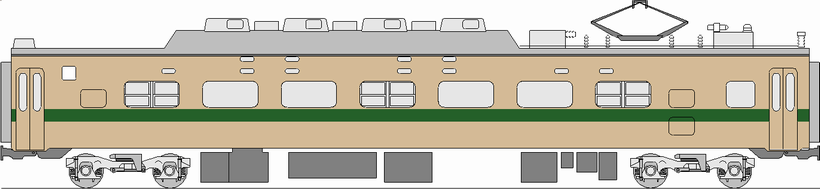
MoHa714

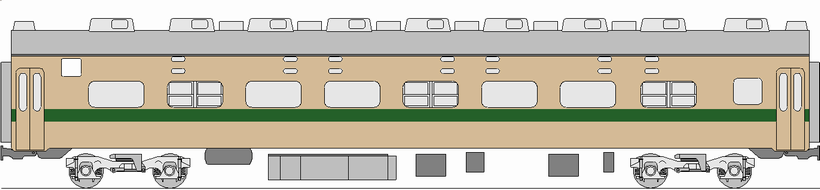
MoHa715

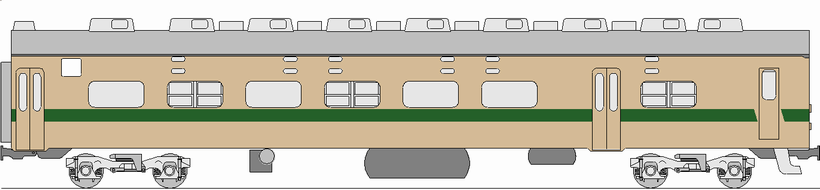
KuHa715-100

== Interior ==
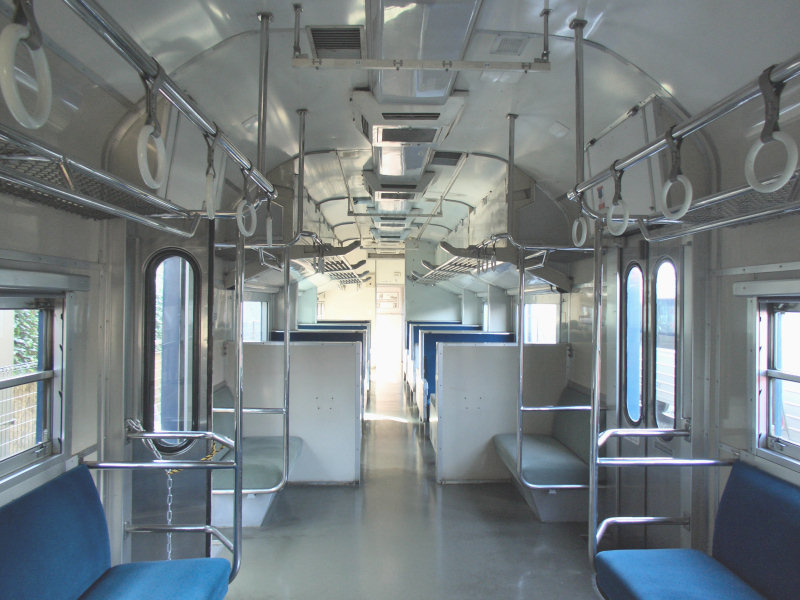
Interior of preserved KuHa 715-1, January 2007

== Rebuilding ==
The sets were rebuilt from surplus former 581/583 series EMU cars at JNR factories in Tsuchisaki (Akita), Kōriyama (Fukushima), Mattō (Ishikawa), and Kokura (Kitakyūshū). Rebuilding work involved removing the upper sleeper berths, adding longitudinal bench seating at the ends of cars, increasing the number of doorways, reducing the number of toilets and washing areas, and the addition of slab-front cab ends to some former intermediate cars.

=== 715-0 series ===
| Rebuilt car | Former identity | Modification details |
|---|---|---|
| KuHa 715 | KuHaNe 581 | Doorway added |
| KuHa 715-100 | SaHaNe 581 | Driving cab added, toilet removed |
| KuHa 714 | SaHaNe 581 | Driving cab added, |
| MoHa 714 | MoHaNe 580 | Doorway added, one pantograph removed, toilet removed |
| MoHa 715 | MoHaNe 581 | |

=== 715-1000 series ===
| Rebuilt car | Former identity | Modification details |
|---|---|---|
| KuHa 715-1000 | KuHaNe 581 | Doorway added |
| KuHa 715-1100 | SaHaNe 581 | Driving cab added, toilet removed |
| MoHa 714-1000 | MoHaNe 582 | Doorway added, one pantograph removed, toilet removed |
| MoHa 715-1000 | MoHaNe 583 | |

== History ==
The JR East 715-1000 series sets were withdrawn from revenue service on 13 March 1998.

The remaining JR Kyushu 715-0 series sets were finally withdrawn from service on 26 March 1998.

== Preserved examples ==
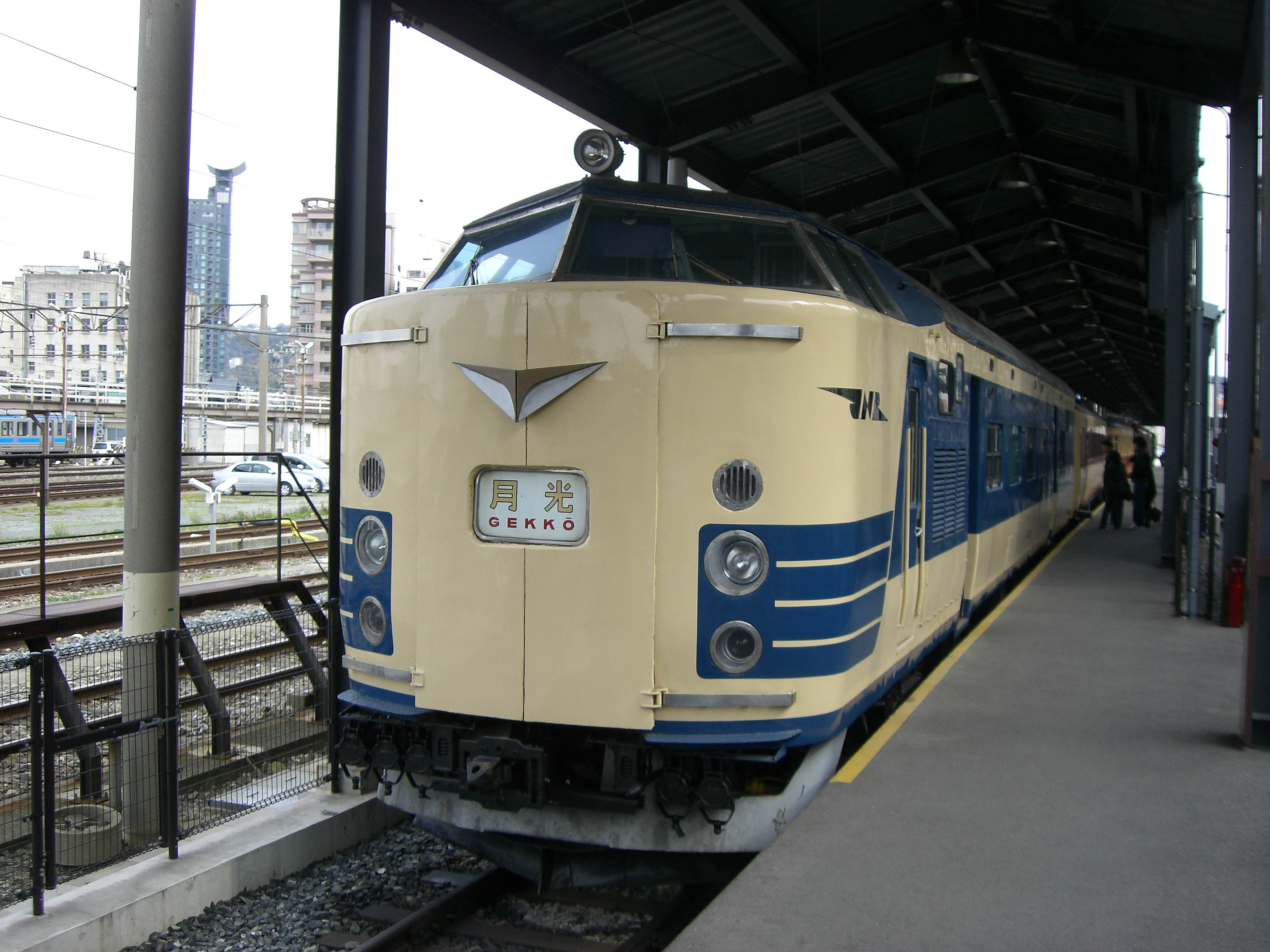
KuHa 715-1, repainted and renumbered as KuHaNe 581-8

KuHa 715-1 is preserved at the Kyushu Railway History Museum in Kitakyushu, restored cosmetically to its original identity of KuHaNe 581-8.

== See also ==
- 419 series, similar EMU used in the Hokuriku region of Japan
