= 583 series =

Japanese train type

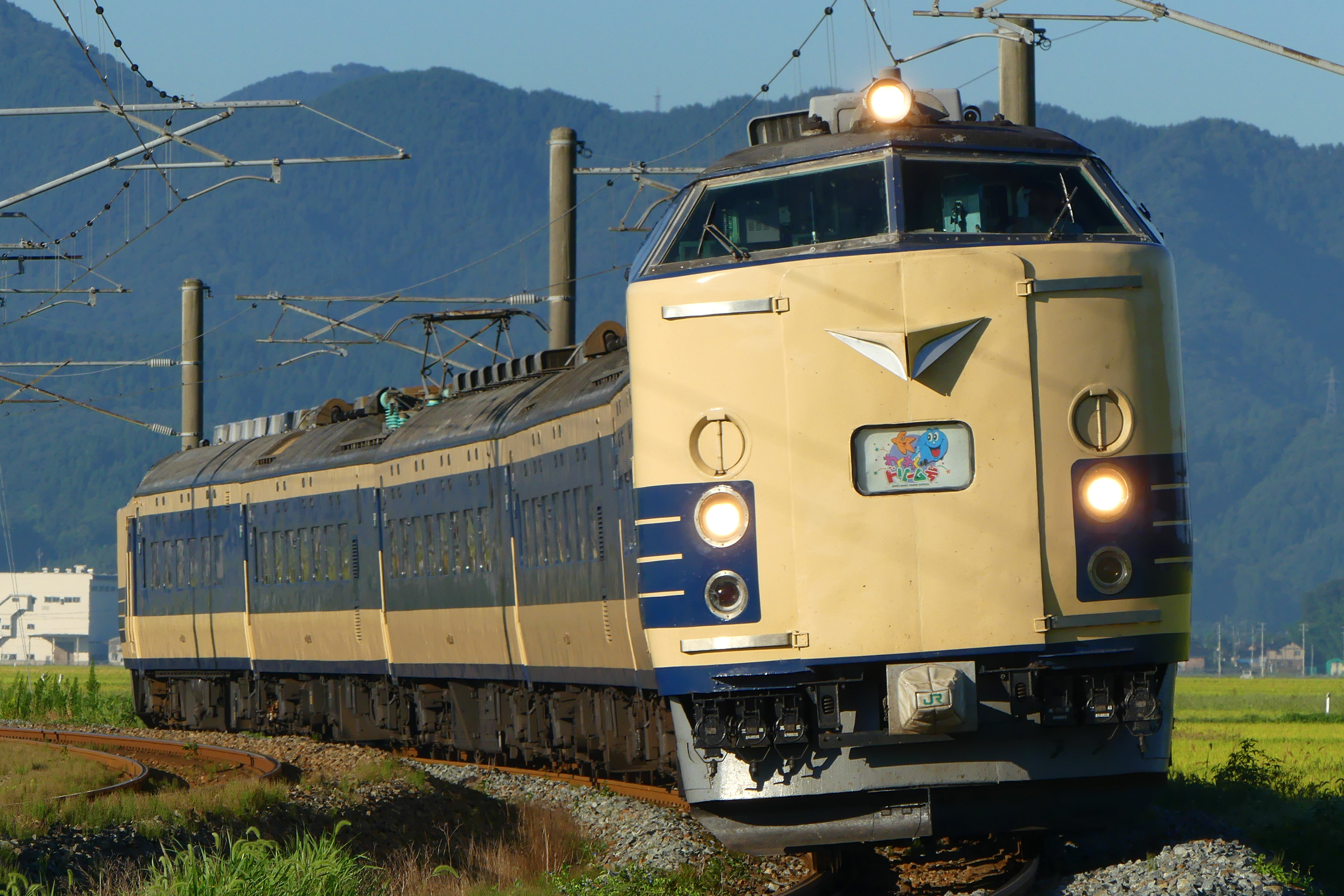
- 583 series N1+N2 set in September 2016
- In service: 1967 – April 2017
- Manufacturers: Hitachi, Kawasaki Heavy Industries, Kinki Sharyo, Nippon Sharyo, Tokyu Car Corporation
- Constructed: 1967–1972
- Number built: 434 vehicles
- Number in service: None
- Number preserved: 6 vehicles
- Number scrapped: 271 vehicles (the rest of 153 vehicles were converted to 419 / 715 series)
- Formation: 6, 10, 12, 13 cars per set
- Operators: ■ JNR (1967-1987); ■ JR Hokkaido (1987-1990); ■ JR East (1987-2017); ■ JR-West (1987-2013)
- Depots: Akita, Sendai, Kyoto

Specifications
- Doors: 1 per side (except dining car)
- Maximum speed: 120 km/h (75 mph)
- Traction system: Resistor control
- Acceleration: 1.3 km/(h⋅s) (0.81 mph/s)
- Electric system: 1,500 V DC, 20 kV AC 50 Hz (583 series), 60 Hz (581, 583 series)
- Braking systems: Dynamic brake, Electro-pneumatic brake
- Safety systems: ATS-S, ATS-P
- Track gauge: 1,067 mm (3 ft 6 in)

Notes/references
- This train won the 11th Blue Ribbon Award in 1968.

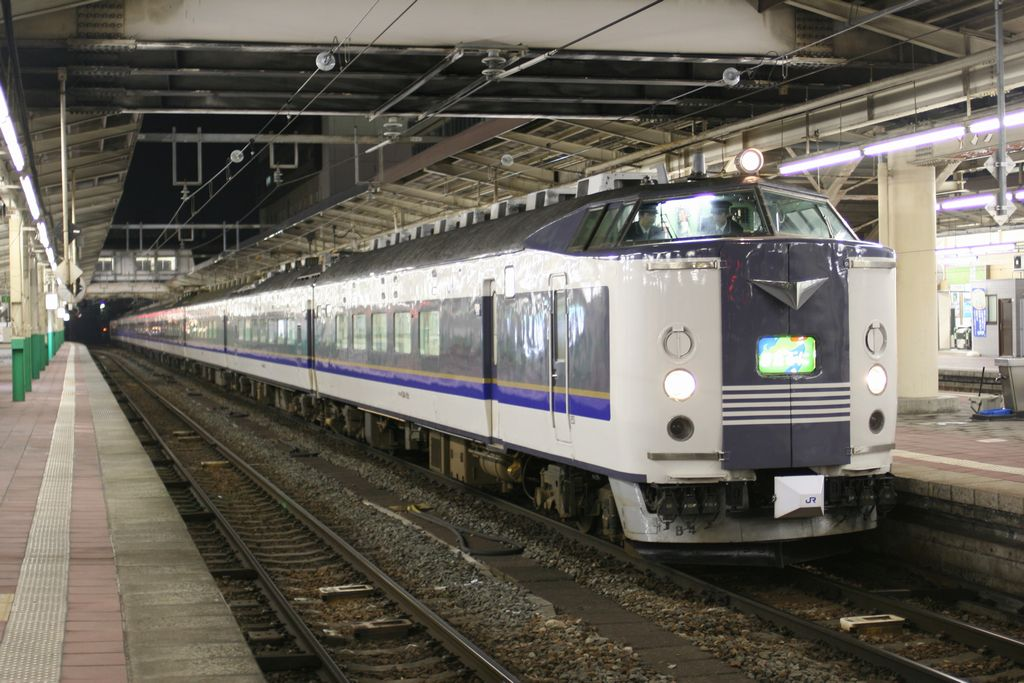
Reliveried 583 series on a Kitaguni service in April 2008

The 581/583 series (581/583系) are a class of limited express electric multiple unit (EMU) introduced in 1967 by Japanese National Railways and later operated by East Japan Railway Company (JR East) and West Japan Railway Company (JR West) on the through services express Kitaguni and other special trains until 2017.

The seats of the 581 and 583 series trains could be transformed into three-berth beds, enabling the trains to be used on both daytime and night train services.

As of 1 October 2016, just six cars remained in service, operated by JR East and based at Akita Depot for use on additional and charter services. This last trainset was withdrawn in April 2017.

== Individual car types ==
- KuHaNe 581: Cab car with air compressor and motor-generator (150 kVA)
- KuHaNe 583: Cab car with air compressor and motor-generator (210 kVA: beneath the floor)
- MoHaNe 580: Motored car with two pantographs (1,500 V DC / 20 kV AC 60 Hz)
- MoHaNe 581: Motored car coupled to MoHaNe 580
- MoHaNe 582: Motored car with two pantographs (1,500 V DC / 20 kV AC 50/60 Hz)
- MoHaNe 583: Motored car coupled to MoHaNe 582
- SaHaNe 581: Intermediate trailer car. All withdrawn.
- SaRo 581: Green (first class) intermediate trailer car. The seats cannot be converted into berths.
- SaRoNe 581: Converted from SaRo 581 in 1985 for Kitaguni services. The berths cannot be converted into seats.
- SaShi 581: Dining car. All withdrawn.
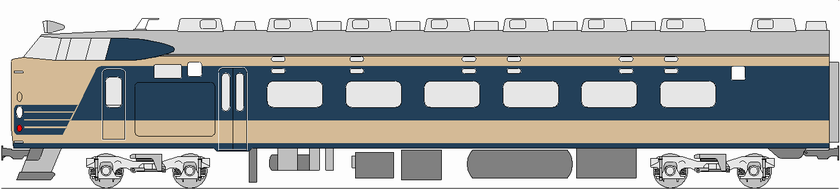
Artist's impression of a KuHaNe 581 coach

== Formations ==
(as of 1 July 2010)

=== JR East (Akita Depot) ===
Car No.	1	2	3	4	5	6
Numbering	KuHaNe 583	MoHaNe 582	MoHaNe 583	MoHaNe 582	MoHaNe 583	KuHaNe 583

=== JR East (Sendai Depot) ===
Set N1/N2:

Car No.	1	2	3	4	5	6
Numbering	KuHaNe 583	MoHaNe 582	MoHaNe 583	MoHaNe 582	MoHaNe 583	KuHaNe 583

=== JR West (Kyoto Depot) ===
Sets B04-06:

Car No.	1	2	3	4	5	6	7	8	9	10
Numbering	KuHaNe 581	MoHaNe 582	MoHaNe 583	MoHaNe 582	MoHaNe 583	SaRo 581	SaRoNe 581	MoHaNe 582		KuHaNe 581

== Interior ==
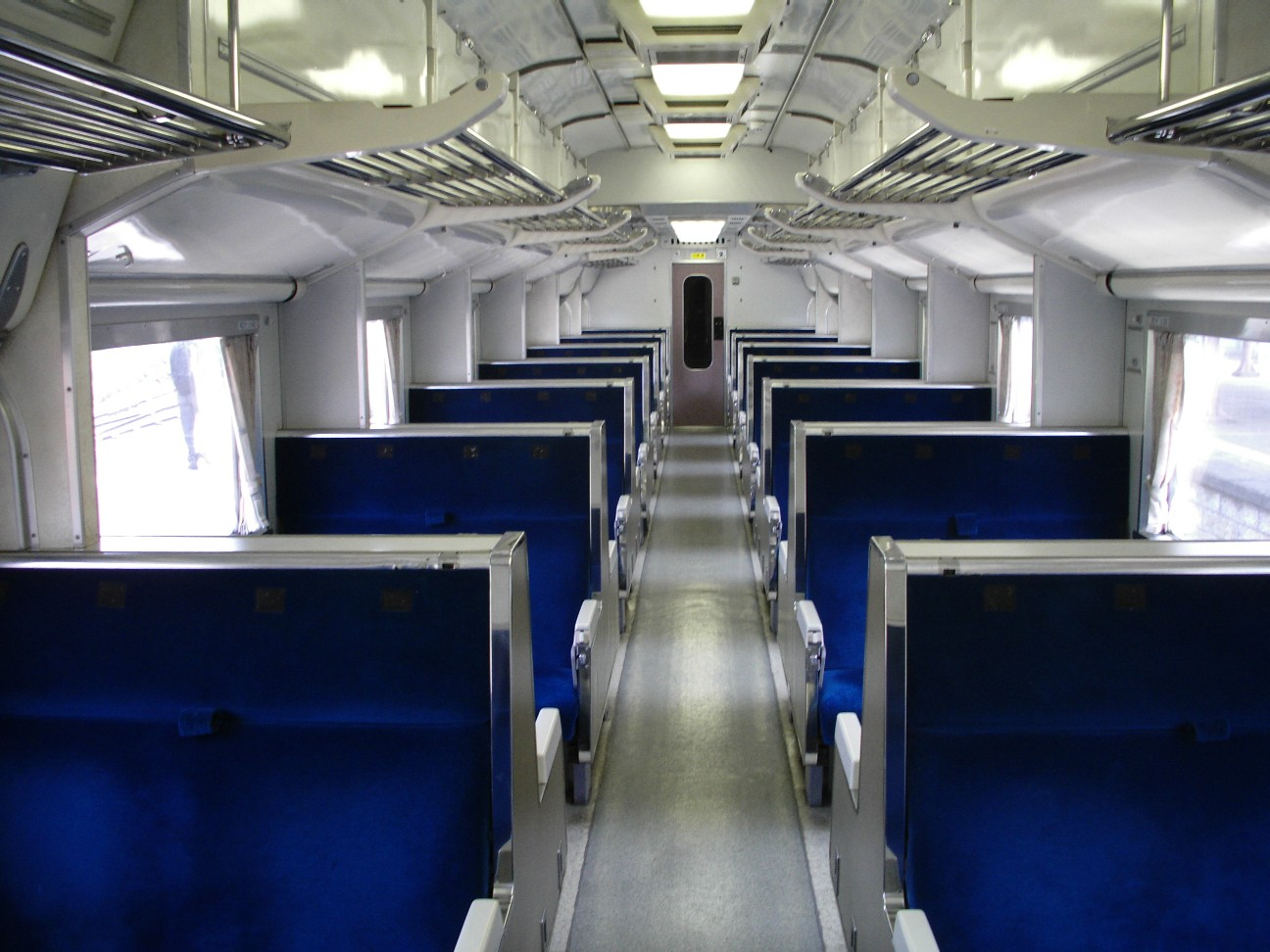
Seating arrangement in a 583 series coach

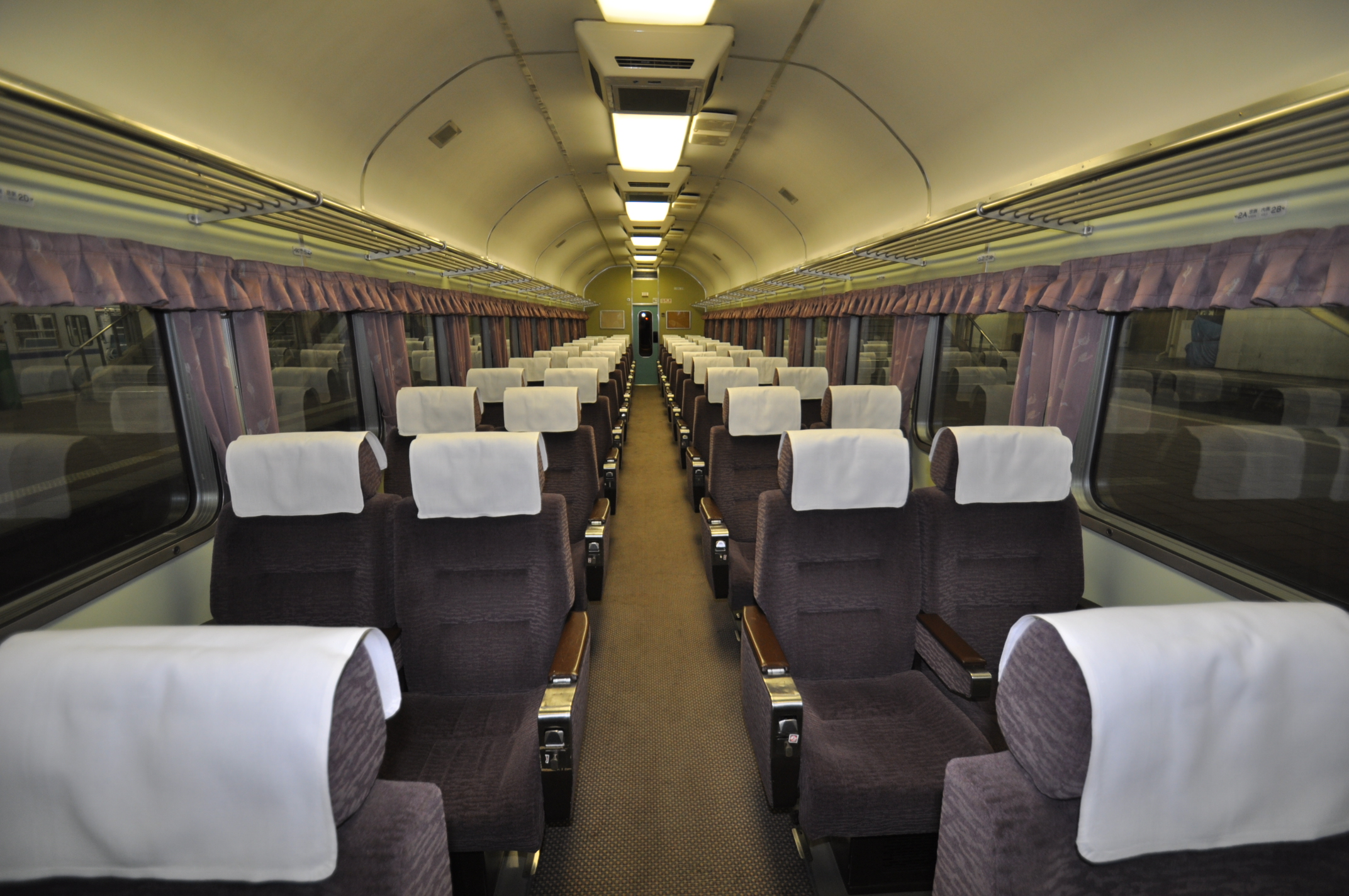
The interior of a Saro 581 Green seating car in 2010

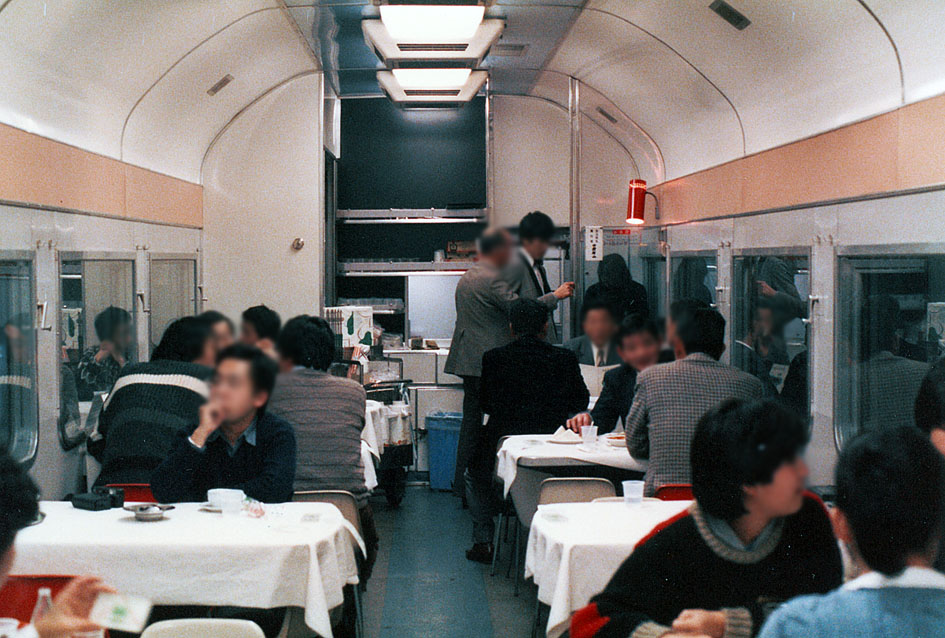
The interior of a SaShi 581 dining car in 1985

== History ==
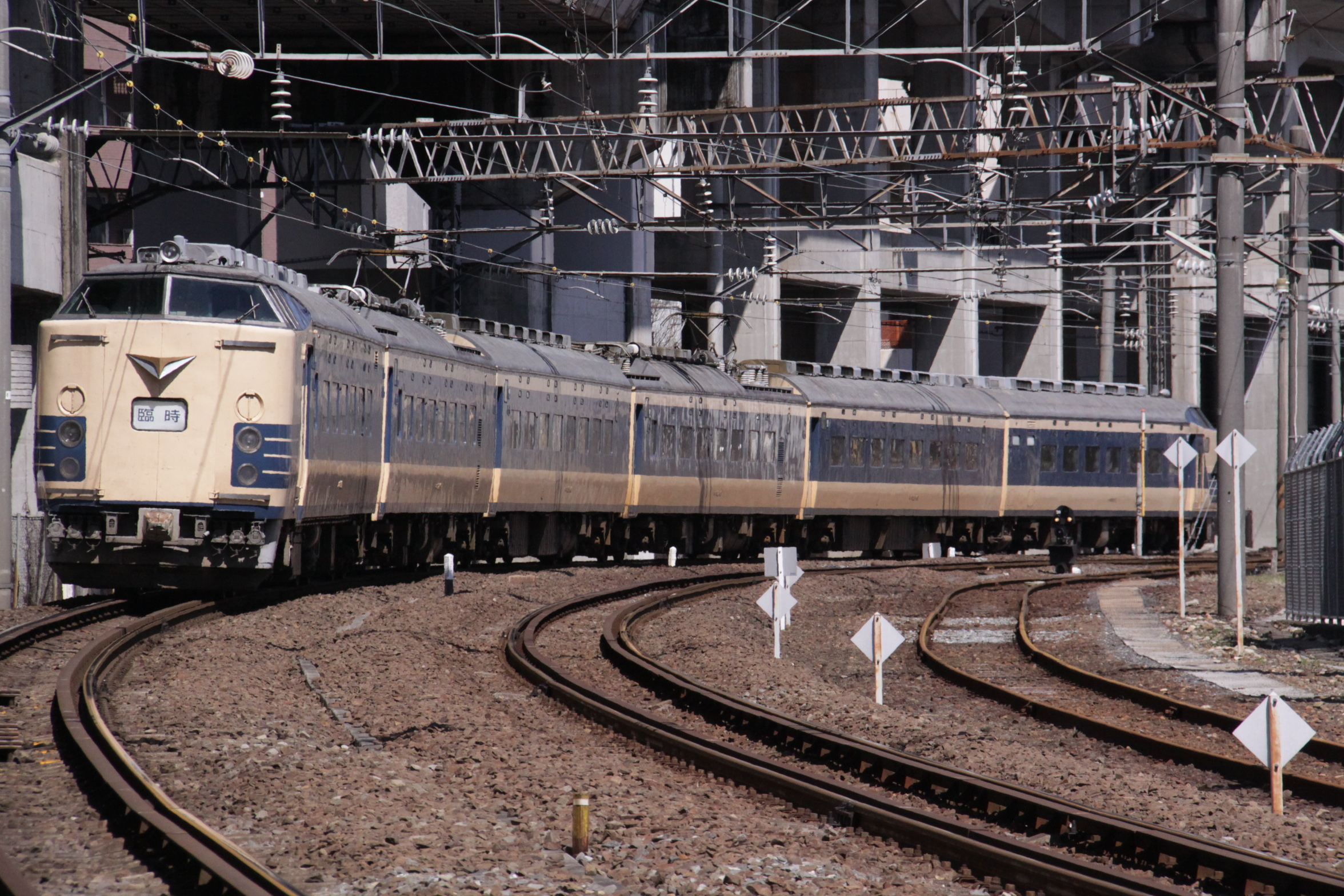
A 583 series set at Sendai Station in April 2011, operating a Shinkansen Relay service

The 581 series was introduced in 1967 on the Midori (Shin-Ōsaka - Kumamoto daytime limited express) and Gekkō (Shin-Osaka - Hakata night limited express).

The 583 series was introduced in 1968 on the Hatsukari (Ueno - Aomori via Tōhoku Main Line daytime), Hakutsuru (Ueno - Aomori via Tōhoku Main Line night), and Yūzuru (Ueno - Aomori via Jōban Line night).

These trains were subsequently used on other limited express services.

In 1982, when the Tohoku Shinkansen opened, many cars became surplus to requirements, and some were remodeled into 419 series and 715 series EMUs.

The last remaining trainset in service, a six-car set based at JR East's Akita Depot made its final run on 8 April 2017, on a charter service between Akita and Hirosaki.

== Preserved examples ==
As of April 2018, six former 581 series cars are preserved statically.

- KuHaNe 581 8: Preserved at the Kyushu Railway History Museum in Kitakyushu, Fukuoka (cosmetically restored from its previous identity as KuHa 715-1).
- SaHaNe 581 19: Preserved at the "Truck Kingdom" (トロッコ王国) in Bifuka, Hokkaido.
- SaShi 581 31: Preserved adjacent to the Hachinohe City Museum in Hachinohe, Aomori.
- KuHaNe 581 35: Preserved at the Kyoto Railway Museum in Kyoto since April 2016.

In February 2015, JR-West car KuHaNe 581 35, formerly stored at Suita Depot in Osaka, was moved to Kyoto for exhibition at the Kyoto Railway Museum opening in April 2016. It was returned from its previous Kitaguni livery to its original JNR blue and cream livery.

In August 2017, JR East announced the donation of two former intermediate 583 series cars (MoHaNe 582-106 and MoHaNe 583-106), which will be preserved at the National Taiwan Museum in Taiwan. The 583 series is known to be the first sleeper EMU introduced in Japan in the late 1960s.

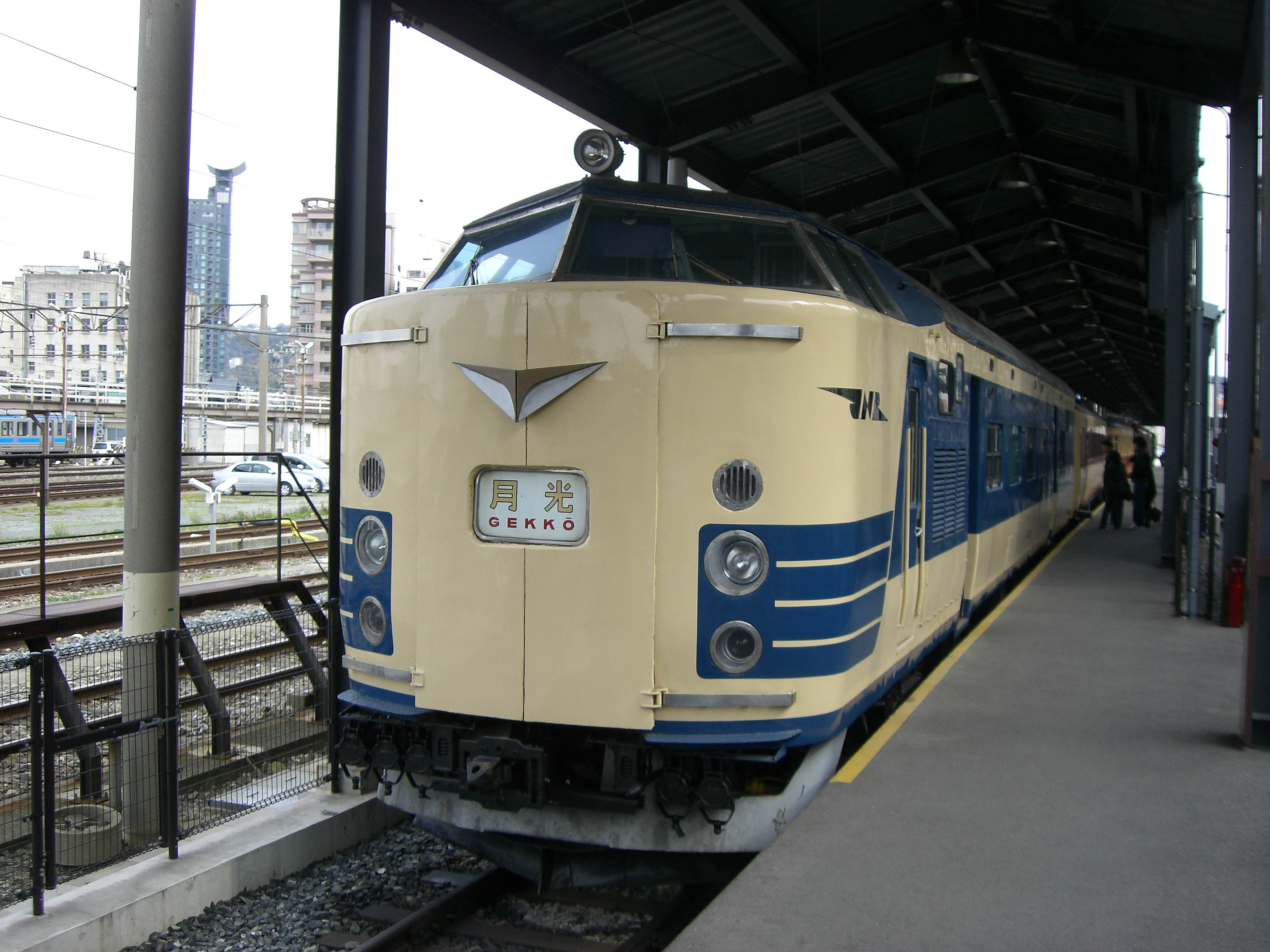
KuHaNe 581 8 at the Kyushu Railway History Museum

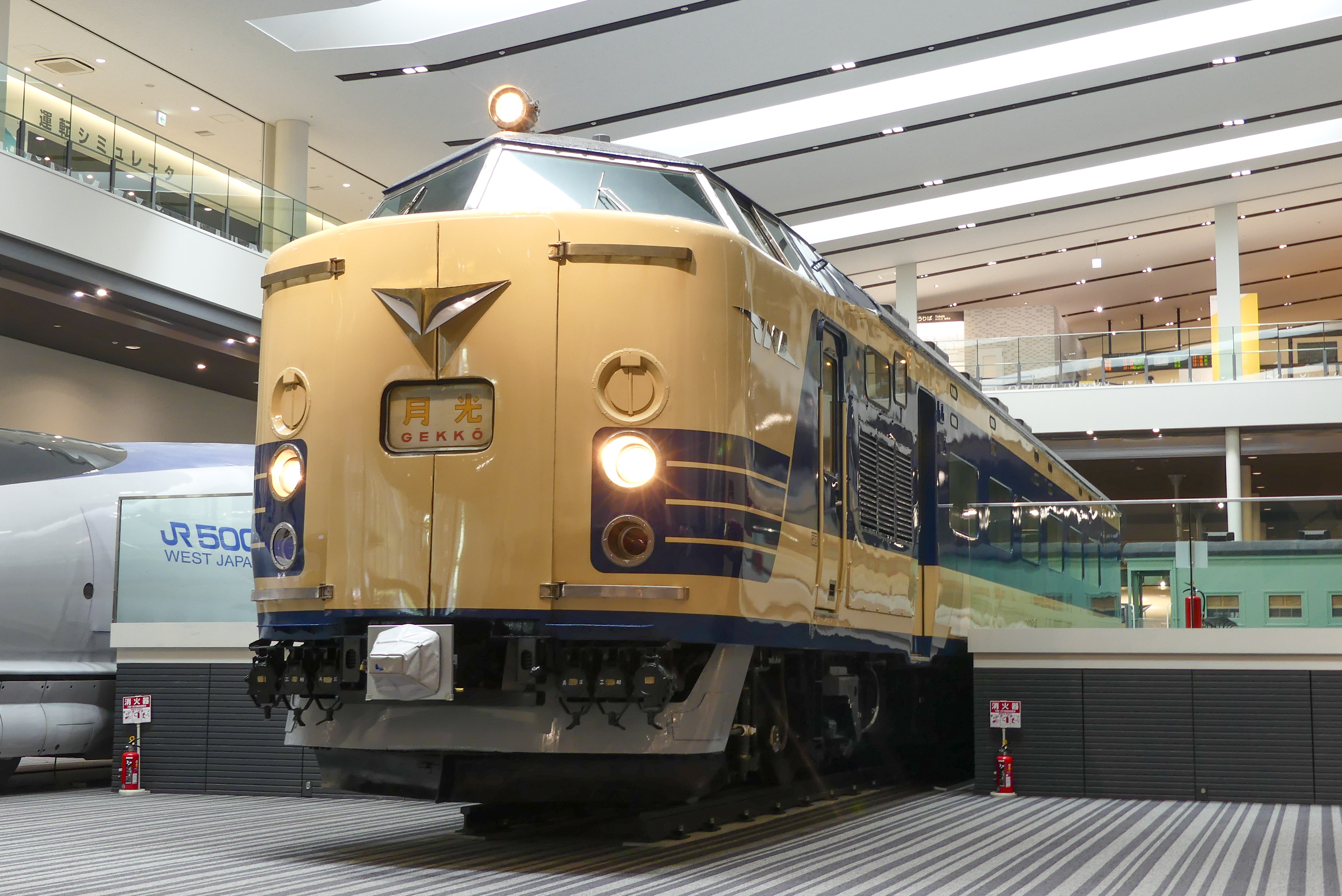
KuHaNe 581 35 at the Kyoto Railway Museum in September 2018

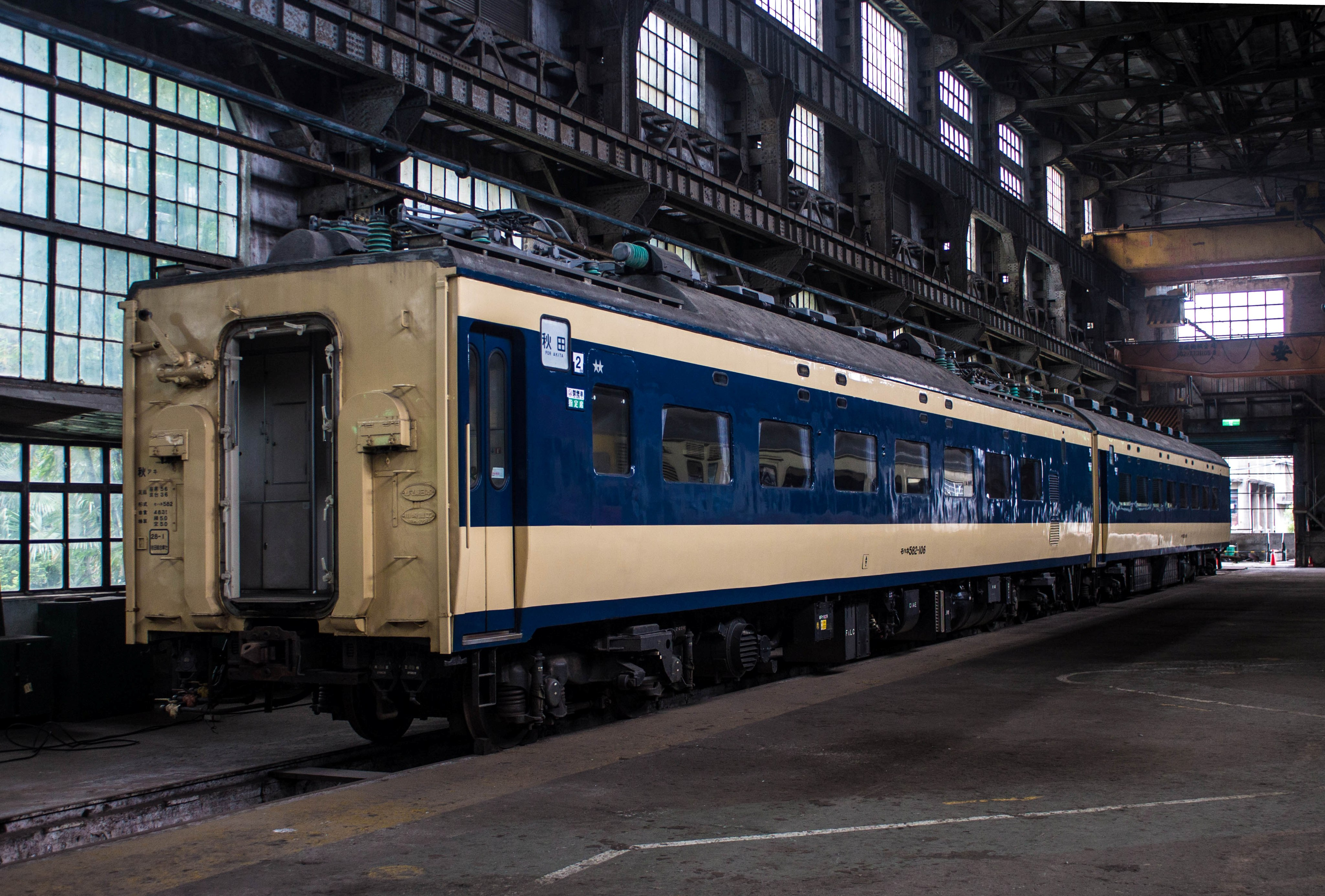
583 series intermediate cars at the Taipei Railway Workshop

== In fiction ==
The story "Ah, My Beloved 583-series" of the anime The Laughing Salesman NEW focuses on a man whose dream is to ride the 583-Type train and is given a once-only chance by Moguro, however boarding the train again condemns him to stay on it forever.
