= Miyama Station =

Railway station in Fukui, Fukui Prefecture, Japan

Miyama Station 美山駅
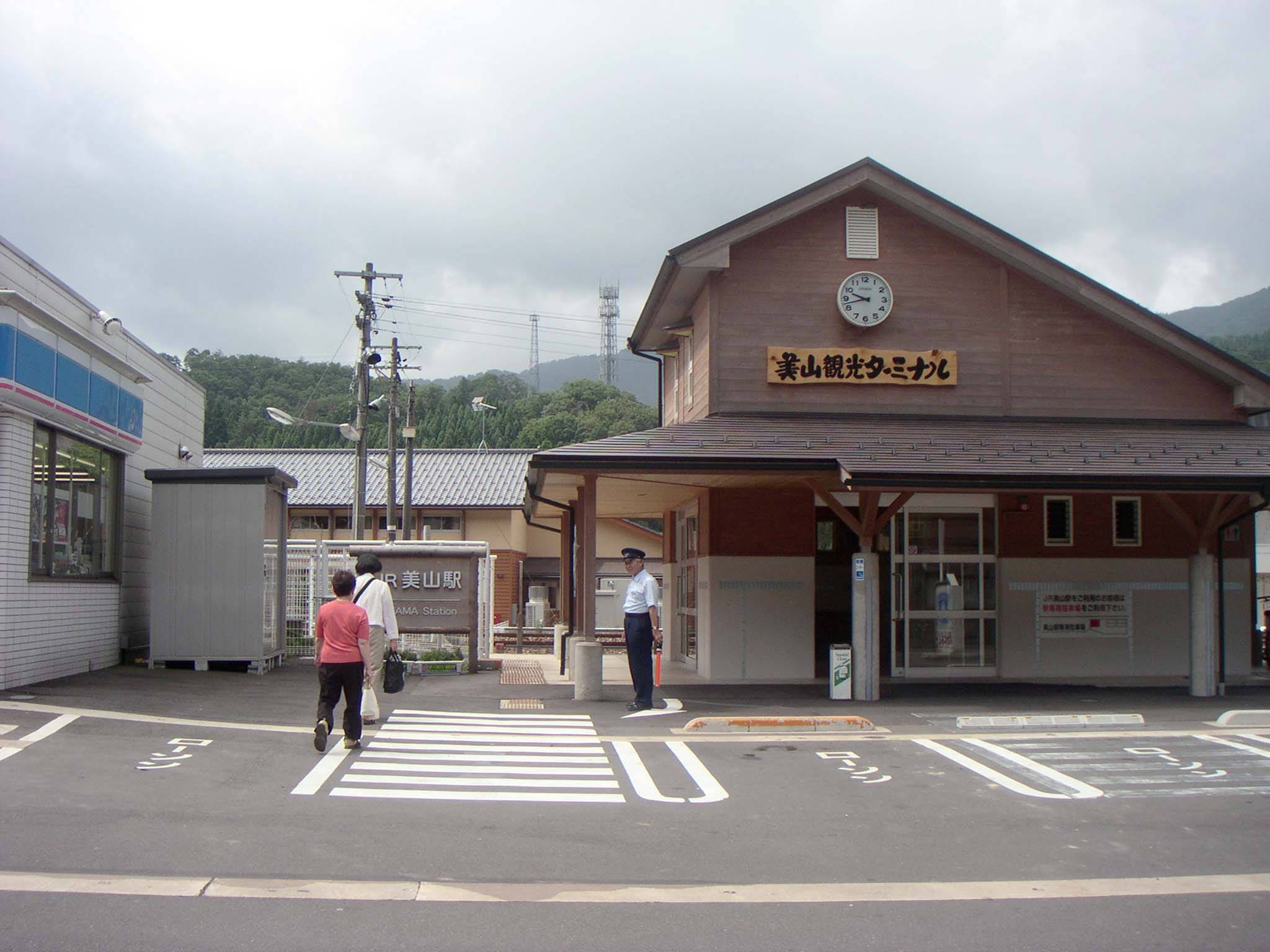
- Miyama Station in July 2005

General information
- Location: 2-20 Sakaideracho, Fukui, Fukui Prefecture 910-2347; Japan
- Coordinates: 35°59′55″N 136°21′54″E
- Operator: JR West
- Line: ■ Etsumi-Hoku Line (Kuzuryū Line)
- Distance: 17.5 km from Echizen-Hanandō
- Platforms: 1 island platform
- Tracks: 2

Other information
- Status: Unstaffed
- Website: Official website

History
- Opened: December 15, 1960
Location
- Location within Japan

Miyama Station (美山駅, Miyama-eki) is a JR West railway station in the city of Fukui, Fukui, Japan.

== Lines ==
Miyama Station is served by the Etsumi-Hoku Line, and is located 17.5 kilometers from the terminus of the line at Echizen-Hanandō and 20.1 kilometers from Fukui.

== Station layout ==
The station consists of one ground-level unnumbered island platform connected to the station building by a level crossing. The station is unattended.

=== Platforms ===
station side	■ Etsumi-Hoku Line	for Kuzuryūko
opposite side	■ Etsumi-Hoku Line	for Fukui

== Adjacent stations ==
«	Service	»
Etsumi Hoku Line
Kowashōzu	Local	Echizen-Yakushi

== History ==
Miyama Station opened on December 15, 1960. With the privatization of Japanese National Railways (JNR) on 1 April 1987, the station came under the control of JR West. The station was closed from July 18, 2004 to June 30, 2007 due to damages to the tracks following torrential rains, and services were temporality replaced by a bus service.

== Surrounding area ==
Former Miyama Town Hall

- National Route 158
- Miyama Junior High School

== See also ==
- List of railway stations in Japan
