= Rokujō =

Rokujō (六条 or 六條) literally means sixth street in Japanese. It can refer to:

== People ==
- Emperor Rokujō, the 79th Emperor of Japan
- the Rokujō family, a poetically conservative faction in the Japanese Imperial court
- Lady Rokujō, a character in the Tale of Genji
- Miyuki Rokujō, a fictional character in Strawberry Panic!—see List of Strawberry Panic! characters

== Places ==
- Rokujō Street (六条通, Rokujō-dori), one of east–west streets in the ancient capital of Heian-kyō, present-day Kyoto
- Rokujō Station, a train station on the JR West Etsumi-Hoku Line in Fukui, Fukui, Japan
