= Echizen-Tōgō Station =

Railway station in Fukui, Fukui Prefecture, Japan

Echizen-Tōgō Station 越前東郷駅
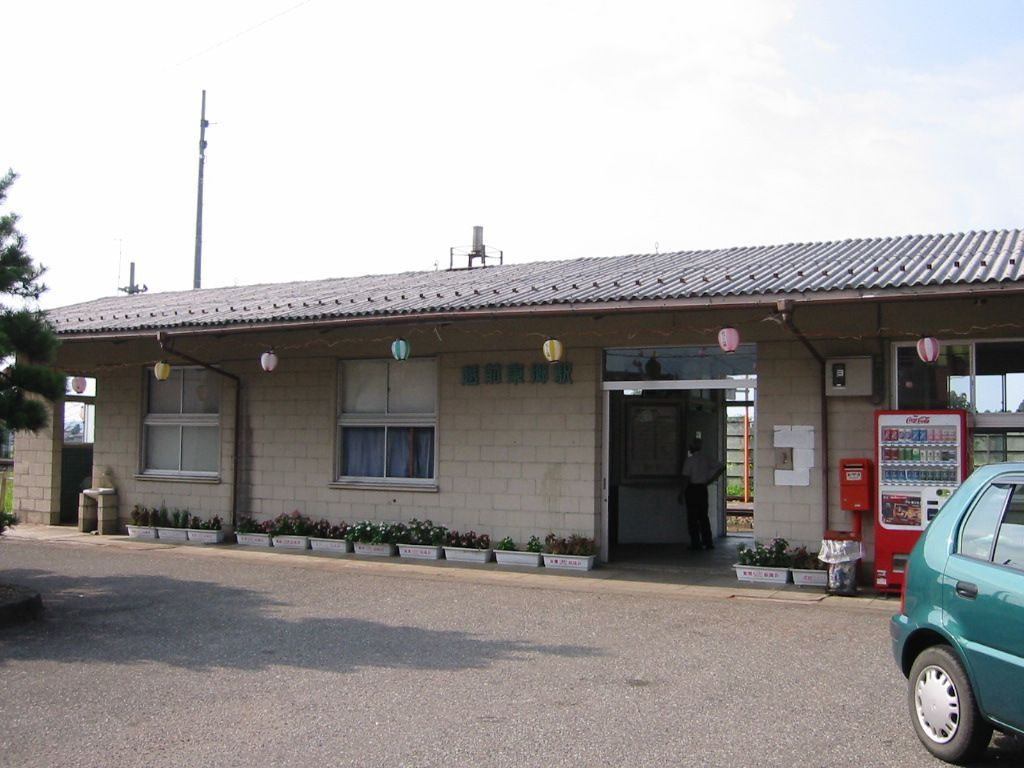
- Echizen-Tōgō Station in 2001

General information
- Location: 34-4 Tōgōnikacho, Fukui, Fukui Prefecture 910-2165; Japan
- Coordinates: 36°01′06″N 136°16′25″E
- Operator: JR West
- Line: ■ Etsumi-Hoku Line (Kuzuryū Line)
- Distance: 5.7 km from Echizen-Hanandō
- Platforms: 1 island platform
- Tracks: 1

Other information
- Status: Unstaffed
- Website: Official website

History
- Opened: December 15, 1960
Location
- Location within Japan

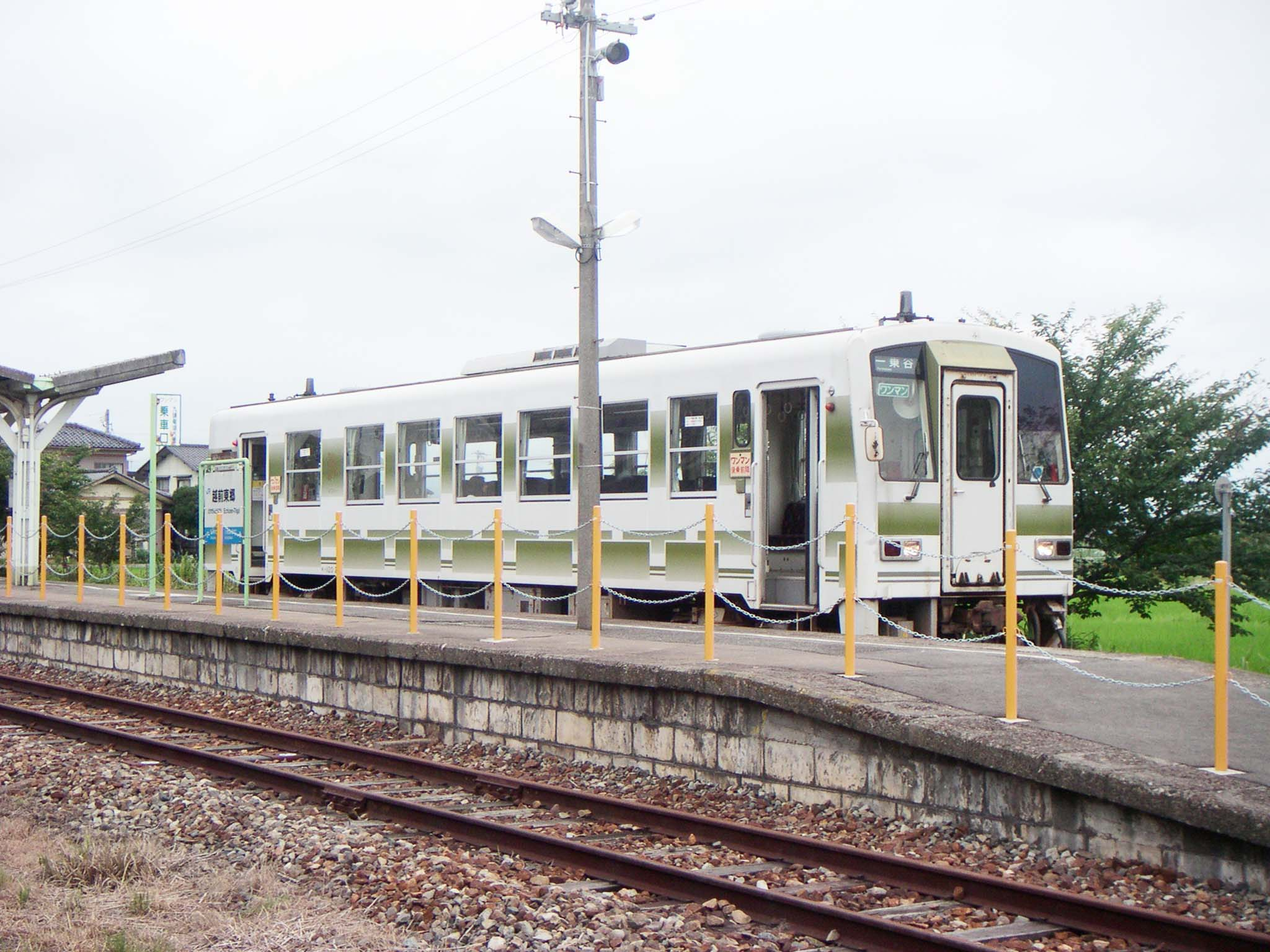
Train at platform of Echizen-Tōgō Station

Echizen-Tōgō Station (越前東郷駅, Echizen-Tōgō-eki) is a JR West railway station in the city of Fukui, Fukui, Japan.

== Lines ==
Echizen-Tōgō Station is served by the Etsumi-Hoku Line, and is located 5.7 kilometers from the terminus of the line at Echizen-Hanandō and 8.3 kilometers from Fukui.

== Station layout ==
The station consists of one ground-level island platform; however, one side is a dead-headed siding, and the other side serves single bi-directional track. The station is unattended.

== Adjacent stations ==
«	Service	»
Etsumi Hoku Line
Asuwa	Local	Ichijōdani

== History ==
Echizen-Tōgō Station opened on December 15, 1960. With the privatization of Japanese National Railways (JNR) on 1 April 1987, the station came under the control of JR West. The station was closed from July 18, 2004 to June 30, 2007 due to damages to the tracks following torrential rains, and services were temporality replaced by a bus service.

== Surrounding area ==
- Fukui Tōgō Elementary School
- Site of Makiyama Castle

== See also ==
- List of railway stations in Japan
