= Echizen-Tano Station =

Railway station in Ōno, Fukui Prefecture, Japan

Echizen-Tano Station 越前田野駅
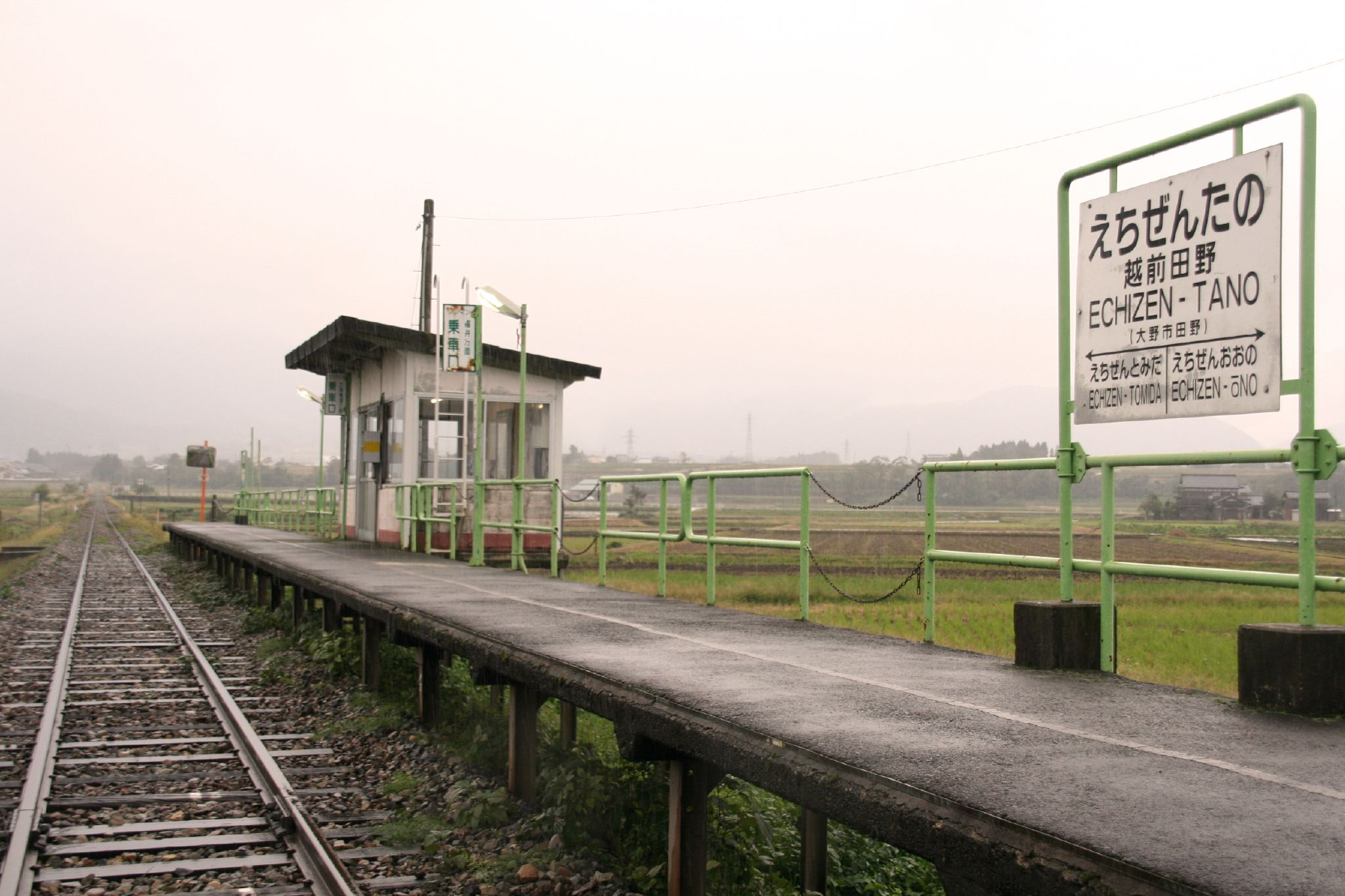
- Echizen-Tano Station in August 2009

General information
- Location: Tano, Ōno-shi, Fukui-ken 912-0827; Japan
- Coordinates: 35°59′13″N 136°31′37″E
- Operator: JR West
- Line: ■ Etsumi-Hoku Line (Kuzuryū Line)
- Distance: 34.3 km from Echizen-Hanandō
- Platforms: 1 side platform
- Tracks: 1

Other information
- Status: Unstaffed
- Website: Official website

History
- Opened: April 20, 1964

Passengers
- FY2016: 1
Location
- Location within Japan

Echizen-Tano Station (越前田野駅, Echizen-Tano-eki) is a JR West railway station in the city of Ōno, Fukui, Japan.

== Lines ==
Echizen-Tano Station is served by the Etsumi-Hoku Line, and is located 34.3 kilometers from the terminus of the line at Echizen-Hanandō and 36.9 kilometers from Fukui.

== Station layout ==
The station consists of one ground-level side platform serving single bi-directional track. There is no station building, but only a shelter on the platform. The station is unattended.

== Adjacent stations ==
«	Service	»
Etsumi Hoku Line
Echizen-Tomida	Local	Echizen-Ōno

== History ==
Echizen-Tano Station opened on April 20, 1964. With the privatization of Japanese National Railways on 1 April 1987, the station came under the control of JR West.

== Surrounding area ==
- Tomida Post Office
- Shotoku Junior High School

== See also ==
- List of railway stations in Japan
