= Kowashōzu Station =

Railway station in Fukui, Fukui Prefecture, Japan

Kowashōzu Station 小和清水駅
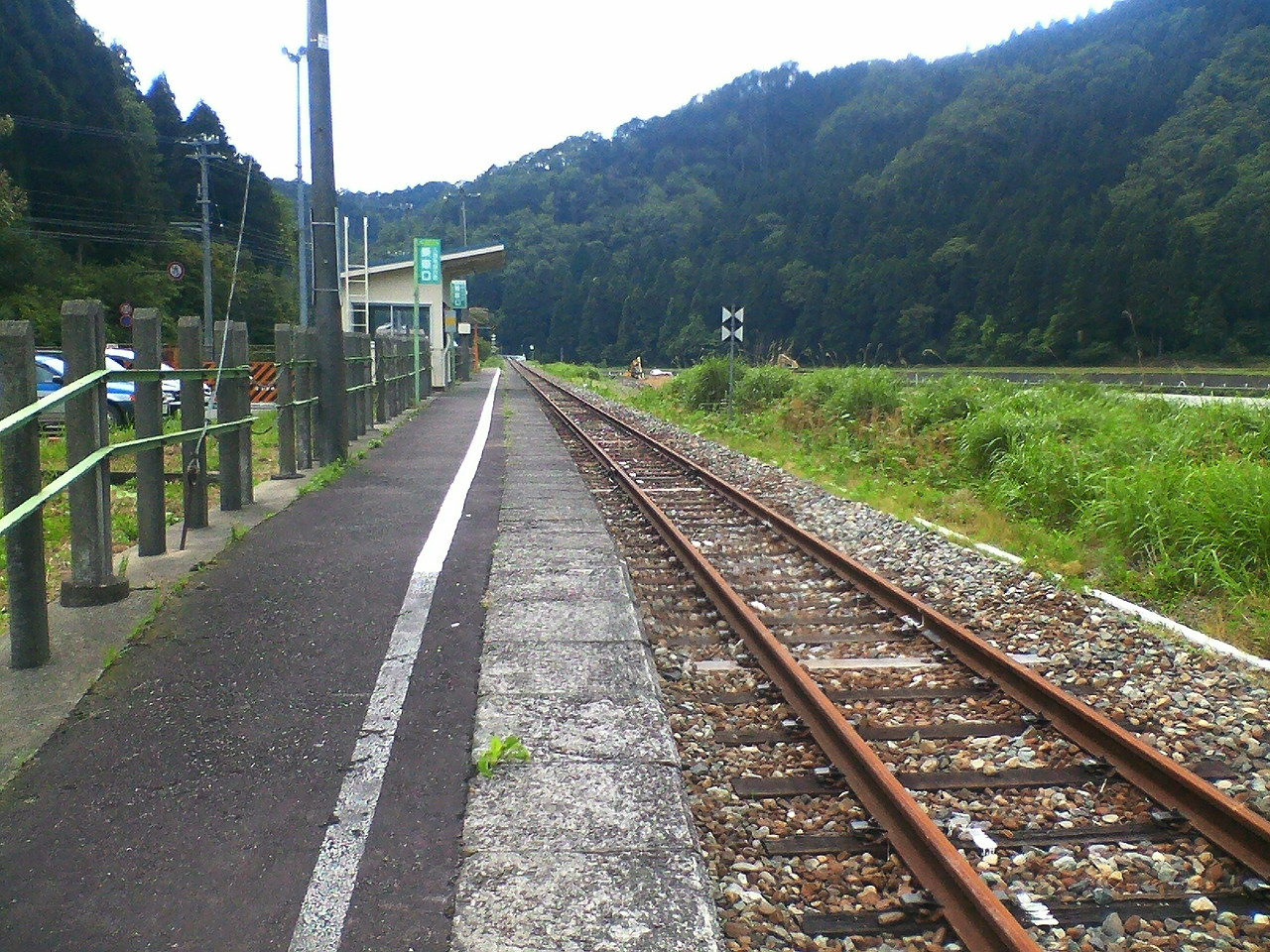
- Kowashōzu Station in August 2007

General information
- Location: Kowashozucho, Fukui, Fukui Prefecture 910-2212; Japan
- Coordinates: 36°01′03″N 136°21′04″E
- Operator: JR West
- Line: ■ Etsumi-Hoku Line (Kuzuryū Line)
- Distance: 14.6 km from Echizen-Hanandō
- Platforms: 1 side platform
- Tracks: 1

Other information
- Status: Unstaffed
- Website: Official website

History
- Opened: December 15, 1960
Location
- Location within Japan

Kowashōzu Station (小和清水駅, Kowashōzu-eki) is a JR West railway station in the city of Fukui, Fukui, Japan.

== Lines ==
Kowashōzu Station is served by the Etsumi-Hoku Line, and is located 14.6 kilometers from the terminus of the line at Echizen-Hanandō and 17.2 kilometers from Fukui.

== Station layout ==
The station consists of one ground-level side platform serving single bi-directional track. There is no station building, but only a shelter on the platform. The station is unattended.

== Adjacent stations ==
| « | Service | » |
Etsumi Hoku Line
| Ichinami | Local | Miyama |

== History ==
Kowashōzu Station opened on December 15, 1960. With the privatization of Japanese National Railways (JNR) on 1 April 1987, the station came under the control of JR West. The station was closed from July 18, 2004, to June 30, 2007, due to damages to the tracks following torrential rains, and services were temporality replaced by a bus service.

== Surrounding area ==
- National Route 158
- Kowashōzu power plant

== See also ==
- List of railway stations in Japan
