= Echizen-Tomida Station =

Railway station in Ōno, Fukui Prefecture, Japan

Echizen-Tomida Station 越前富田駅
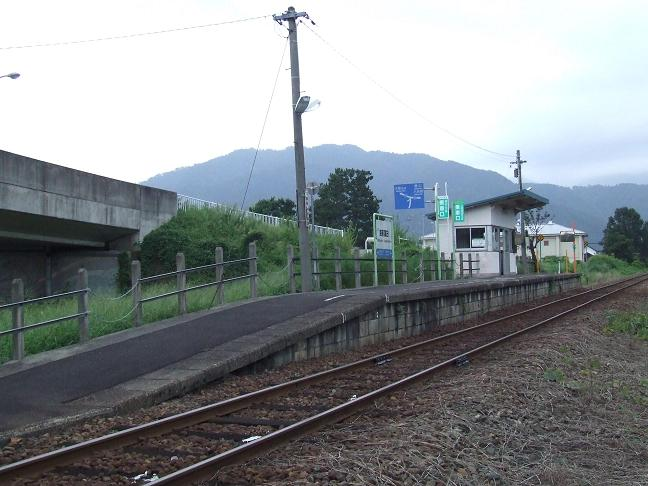
- Echizen-Tomida Station in August 2009

General information
- Location: Uwano, Ōno-shi, Fukui-ken 912-0813; Japan
- Coordinates: 35°59′28″N 136°32′29″E
- Operator: JR West
- Line: ■ Etsumi-Hoku Line (Kuzuryū Line)
- Distance: 27.6 km from Echizen-Hanandō
- Platforms: 1 side platform
- Tracks: 1

Other information
- Status: Unstaffed
- Website: Official website

History
- Opened: December 15, 1960

Passengers
- FY2016: 6
Location
- Location within Japan

Echizen-Tomida Station (越前富田駅, Echizen-Tomida-eki) is a JR West railway station in the city of Ōno, Fukui, Japan.

== Lines ==
Echizen-Tomida Station is served by the Etsumi-Hoku Line, and is located 35.7 kilometers from the terminus of the line at Echizen-Hanandō and 38.3 kilometers from Fukui.

== Station layout ==
The station consists of one ground-level side platform serving single bi-directional track. There is no station building, but only a shelter on the platform. The station is unattended.

== Adjacent stations ==
| « | Service | » |
Etsumi Hoku Line
| Echizen-Tano | Local | Shimoyuino |

== History ==
Echizen-Tomida Station opened on December 15, 1960. With the privatization of Japanese National Railways (JNR) on 1 April 1987, the station came under the control of JR West.

== Surrounding area ==
- Tomida Elementary School
- Shotoku Junior High School

== See also ==
- List of railway stations in Japan
