= Kakigashima Station =

Railway station in Ōno, Fukui Prefecture, Japan

Kakigashima Station 柿ヶ島駅
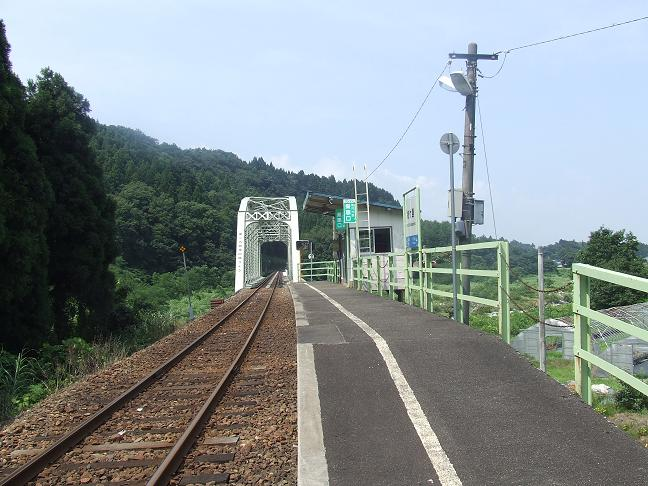
- Kakigashima Station in August 2007

General information
- Location: Kakigashima, Ōno-shi, Fukui-ken 912-0147; Japan
- Coordinates: 35°58′21″N 136°34′15″E
- Operator: JR West
- Line: ■ Etsumi-Hoku Line (Kuzuryū Line)
- Distance: 39.8 km from Echizen-Hanandō
- Platforms: 1 side platform
- Tracks: 1

Other information
- Status: Unstaffed
- Website: Official website

History
- Opened: December 15, 1960

Passengers
- FY2016: 0
Location
- Location within Japan

Kakigashima Station (柿ヶ島駅, Kakigashima-eki) is a JR West railway station in the city of Ōno, Fukui, Japan.

== Lines ==
Kakigashima Station is served by the Etsumi-Hoku Line, and is located 39.8 kilometers from the terminus of the line at Echizen-Hanandō and 42.4 kilometers from Fukui.

== Station layout ==
The station consists of one ground-level side platform serving single bi-directional track. There is no station building, but only a shelter on the platform. The station is unattended.

== Adjacent stations ==
«	Service	»
Etsumi Hoku Line
Shimoyuino	Local	Kadohara

== History ==
Kakigashima Station opened on December 15, 1960. With the privatization of Japanese National Railways (JNR) on 1 April 1987, the station came under the control of JR West.

== Surrounding area ==
- Kuzuryū River

== See also ==
- List of railway stations in Japan
