= Asuwa Station =

Railway station in Fukui, Fukui Prefecture, Japan

Asuwa Station 足羽駅
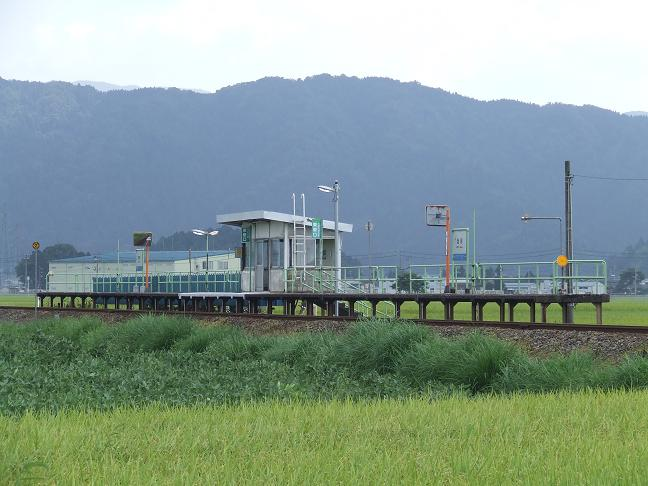
- Asuwa Station in August 2007

General information
- Location: 85-1 Inazucho, Fukui, Fukui Prefecture 910-2177; Japan
- Coordinates: 36°01′15″N 136°15′13″E
- Operator: JR West
- Line: ■ Etsumi-Hoku Line (Kuzuryū Line)
- Distance: 3.7 km from Echizen-Hanandō
- Platforms: 1 side platform
- Tracks: 1

Other information
- Status: Unstaffed
- Website: Official website

History
- Opened: May 20, 1964

Passengers
- FY2015: 7 daily
Location
- Location within Japan

Asuwa Station (足羽駅, Asuwa-eki) is a JR West railway station in the city of Fukui, Fukui, Japan.

== Lines ==
Asuwa Station is served by the Etsumi-Hoku Line, and is located 3.7 kilometers from the terminus of the line at Echizen-Hanandō and 6.3 kilometers from Fukui.

== Station layout ==
The station consists of one ground-level side platform serving single bi-directional track. There is no station building, but only a shelter on the platform. The station is unattended.

== Adjacent stations ==
«	Service	»
Etsumi Hoku Line
Rokujō	Local	Echizen-Tōgō

== History ==
Asuwa Station opened on May 15, 1964. With the privatization of Japanese National Railways (JNR) on 1 April 1987, the station came under the control of JR West.

== Surrounding area ==
- Fukui Asuwa Junior High School

== See also ==
- List of railway stations in Japan
