= Echizen-Ōmiya Station =

Railway station in Fukui, Fukui Prefecture, Japan

Echizen-Ōmiya Station 越前大宮駅
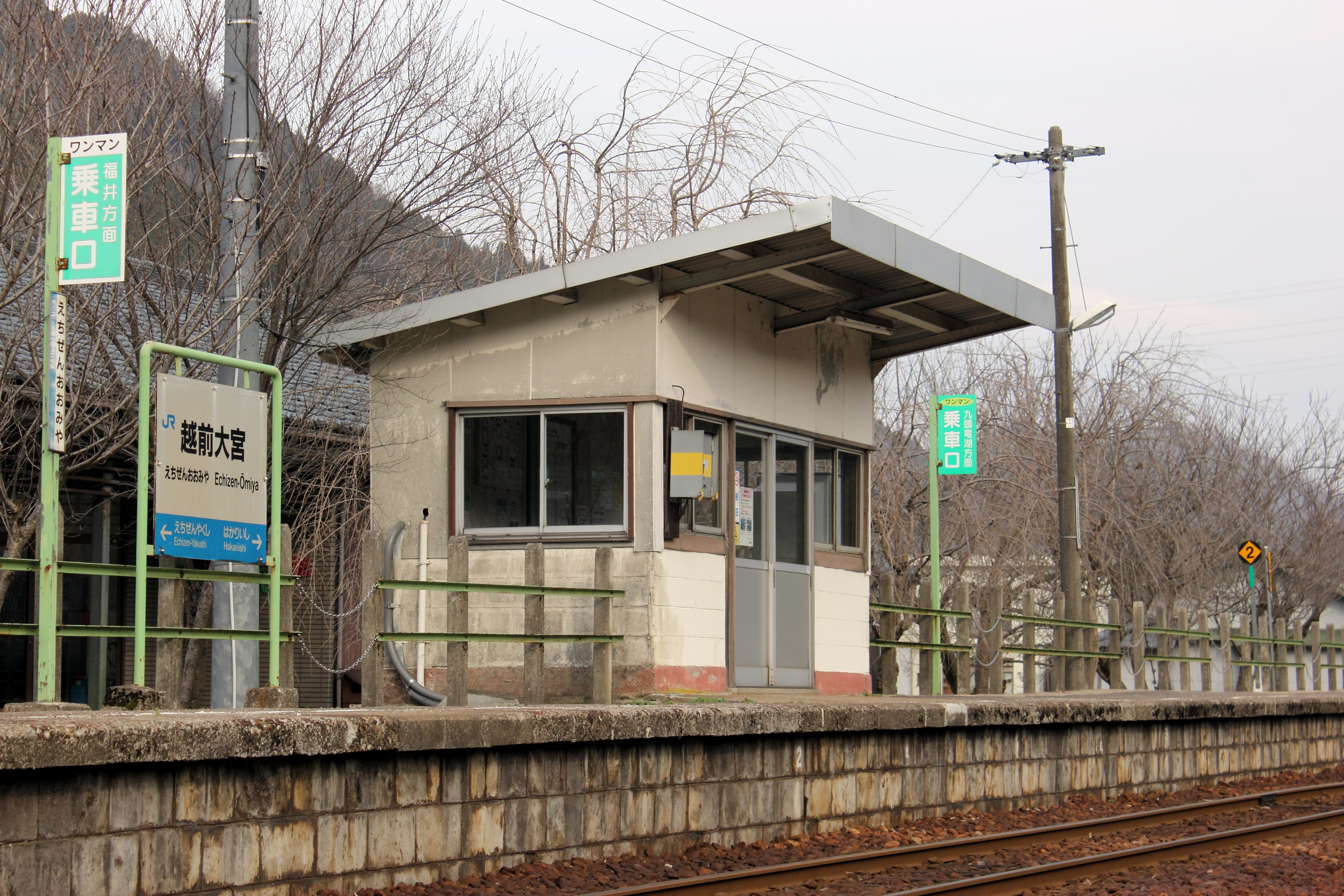
- Echizen-Ōmiya Station in March 2013

General information
- Location: 25 Omiyacho, Fukui, Fukui Prefecture 910-2334; Japan
- Coordinates: 36°00′00″N 136°24′35″E
- Operator: JR West
- Line: ■ Etsumi-Hoku Line (Kuzuryū Line)
- Distance: 12.2 km from Echizen-Hanandō
- Platforms: 1 side platform
- Tracks: 1

Other information
- Status: Unstaffed
- Website: Official website

History
- Opened: December 15, 1960

Passengers
- FY2015: 5
Location
- Location within Japan

Echizen-Ōmiya Station (越前大宮駅, Echizen-Ōmiya eki) is a JR West railway station in the city of Fukui, Fukui, Japan.

== Lines ==
Echizen-Ōmiya Station is served by the Etsumi-Hoku Line, and is located 22.2 kilometers from the terminus of the line at Echizen-Hanandō and 24.8 kilometers from Fukui.

== Station layout ==
The station consists of one ground-level side platform serving single bi-directional track. There is no station building, but only a shelter on the platform. The station is unattended.

== Adjacent stations ==
«	Service	»
Etsumi Hoku Line
Echizen-Yakushi	Local	Hakariishi

== History ==
Echizen-Ōmiya Station opened on December 15, 1960. With the privatization of Japanese National Railways (JNR) on 1 April 1987, the station came under the control of JR West.

== Surrounding area ==
- National Route 158
- Fukui Hanyu Elementary School

== See also ==
- List of railway stations in Japan
