= Echizen-Yakushi Station =

Railway station in Fukui, Fukui Prefecture, Japan

Echizen-Yakushi Station 越前薬師駅
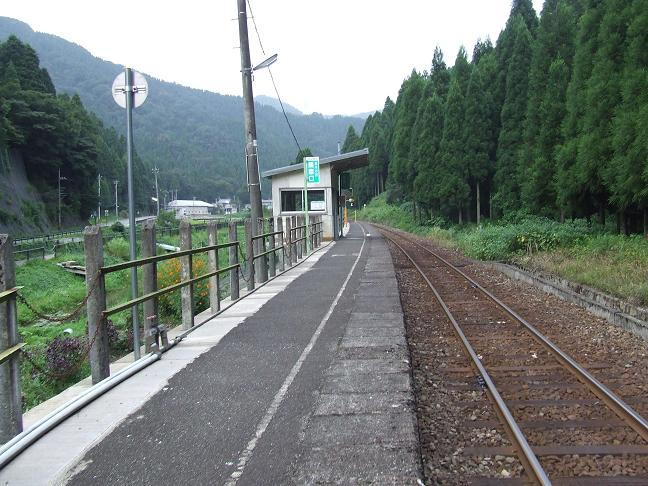
- Echizen-Yakushi Station in August 2009

General information
- Location: 30 Yakushicho, Fukui, Fukui Prefecture 910-2339; Japan
- Coordinates: 36°00′19″N 136°23′04″E
- Operator: JR West
- Line: ■ Etsumi-Hoku Line (Kuzuryū Line)
- Distance: 19.5 km from Echizen-Hanandō
- Platforms: 1 side platform
- Tracks: 1

Other information
- Status: Unstaffed
- Website: Official website

History
- Opened: December 15, 1960
Location
- Location within Japan

Echizen-Yakushi Station (越前薬師駅, Echizen-Yakushi-eki) is a JR West railway station in the city of Fukui, Fukui, Japan.

== Lines ==
Echizen-Yakushi Station is served by the Etsumi-Hoku Line, and is located 19.5 kilometers from the terminus of the line at Echizen-Hanandō and 12.1 kilometers from Fukui.

== Station layout ==
The station consists of one ground-level side platform serving single bi-directional track. There is no station building, but only a shelter on the platform. The station is unattended.

== Adjacent stations ==
«	Service	»
Etsumi Hoku Line
Miyama	Local	Echizen-Ōmiya

== History ==
Echizen-Yakushi Station opened on December 15, 1960. With the privatization of Japanese National Railways (JNR) on 1 April 1987, the station came under the control of JR West.

== Surrounding area ==
- National Route 158

== See also ==
- List of railway stations in Japan
