= Echizen-Shimoyama Station =

Railway station in Ōno, Fukui Prefecture, Japan

Echizen-Shimoyama Station 越前下山駅
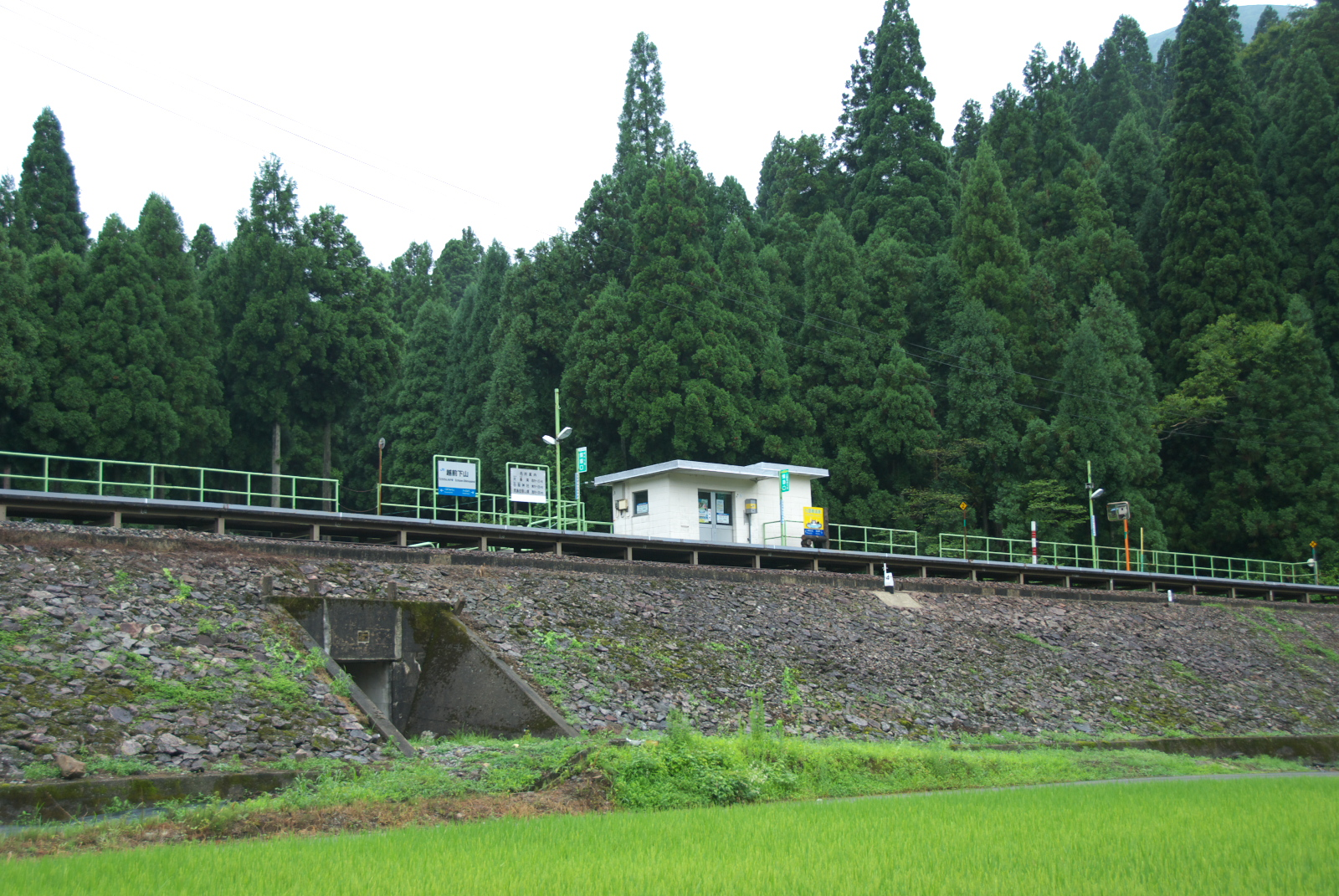
- Echizen-Shimoyama Station in July 2008

General information
- Location: Shimoyama, Ōno-shi, Fukui-ken 912-0207; Japan
- Coordinates: 35°55′14″N 136°38′06″E
- Operator: JR West
- Line: ■ Etsumi-Hoku Line (Kuzuryū Line)
- Distance: 48.8 km from Echizen-Hanandō
- Platforms: 1 side platform
- Tracks: 1

Other information
- Status: Unstaffed
- Website: Official website

History
- Opened: December 15, 1972

Passengers
- FY2016: 2
Location
- Location within Japan

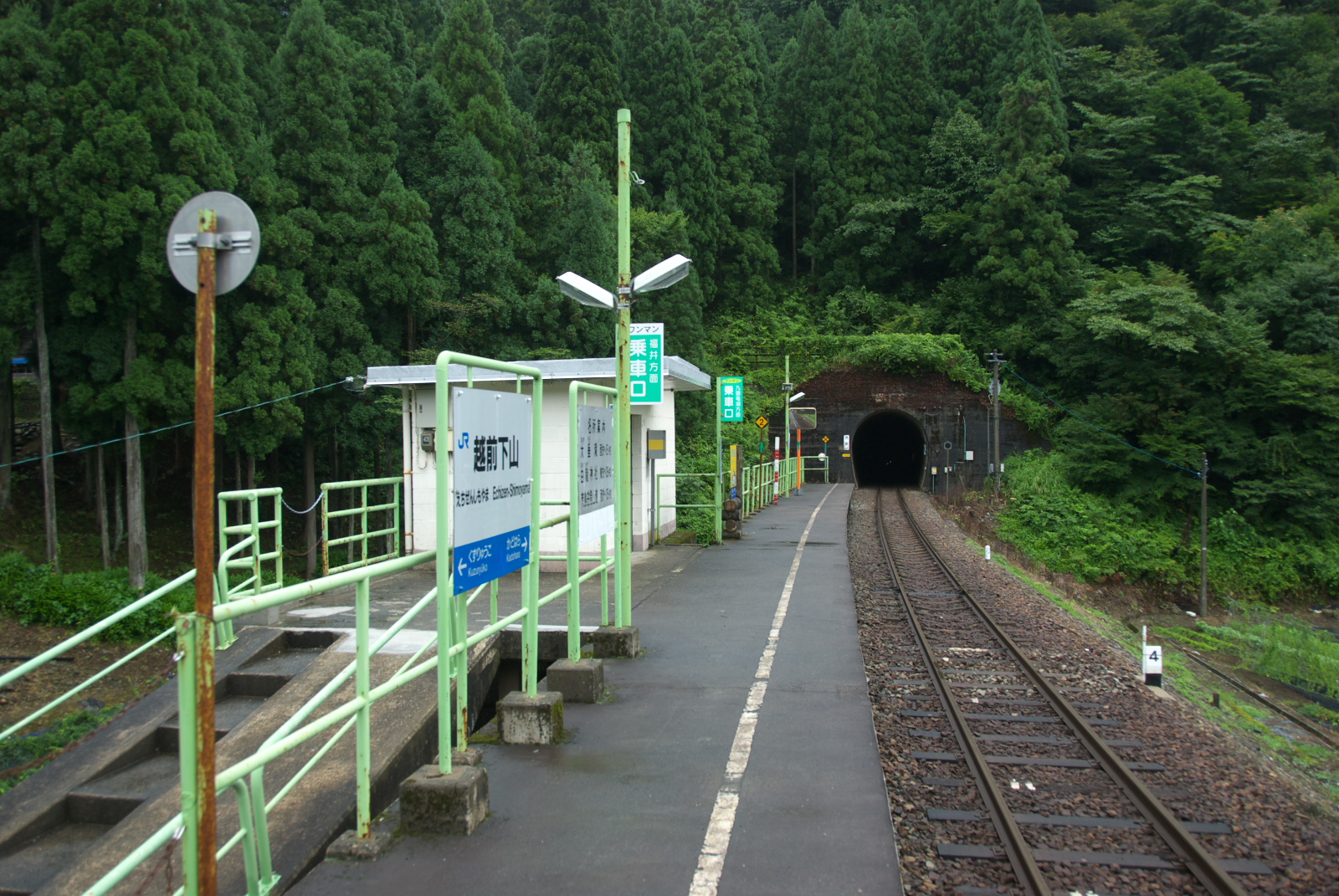
Platform

Echizen-Shimoyama (越前下山駅, Echizen-Shimoyama-eki) is a JR West railway station in the city of Ōno, Fukui, Japan.

== Lines ==
Echizen-Shimoyama Station is served by the Etsumi-Hoku Line, and is located 48.8 kilometers from the terminus of the line at Echizen-Hanandō and 51.4 kilometers from Fukui.

== Station layout ==
The station consists of one ground-level side platform serving single bi-directional track. There is no station building, but only a shelter on the platform. The station is unattended.

== Adjacent stations ==
«	Service	»
Etsumi Hoku Line
Kadohara	Local	Kuzuryūko

== History ==
Echizen-Shimoyama Station opened on December 15, 1972. With the privatization of Japanese National Railways (JNR) on 1 April 1987, the station came under the control of JR West.

== Surrounding area ==
- Kuzuryū River

== See also ==
- List of railway stations in Japan
