= Hakariishi Station =

Railway station in Fukui, Fukui Prefecture, Japan

Hakariishi Station 計石駅
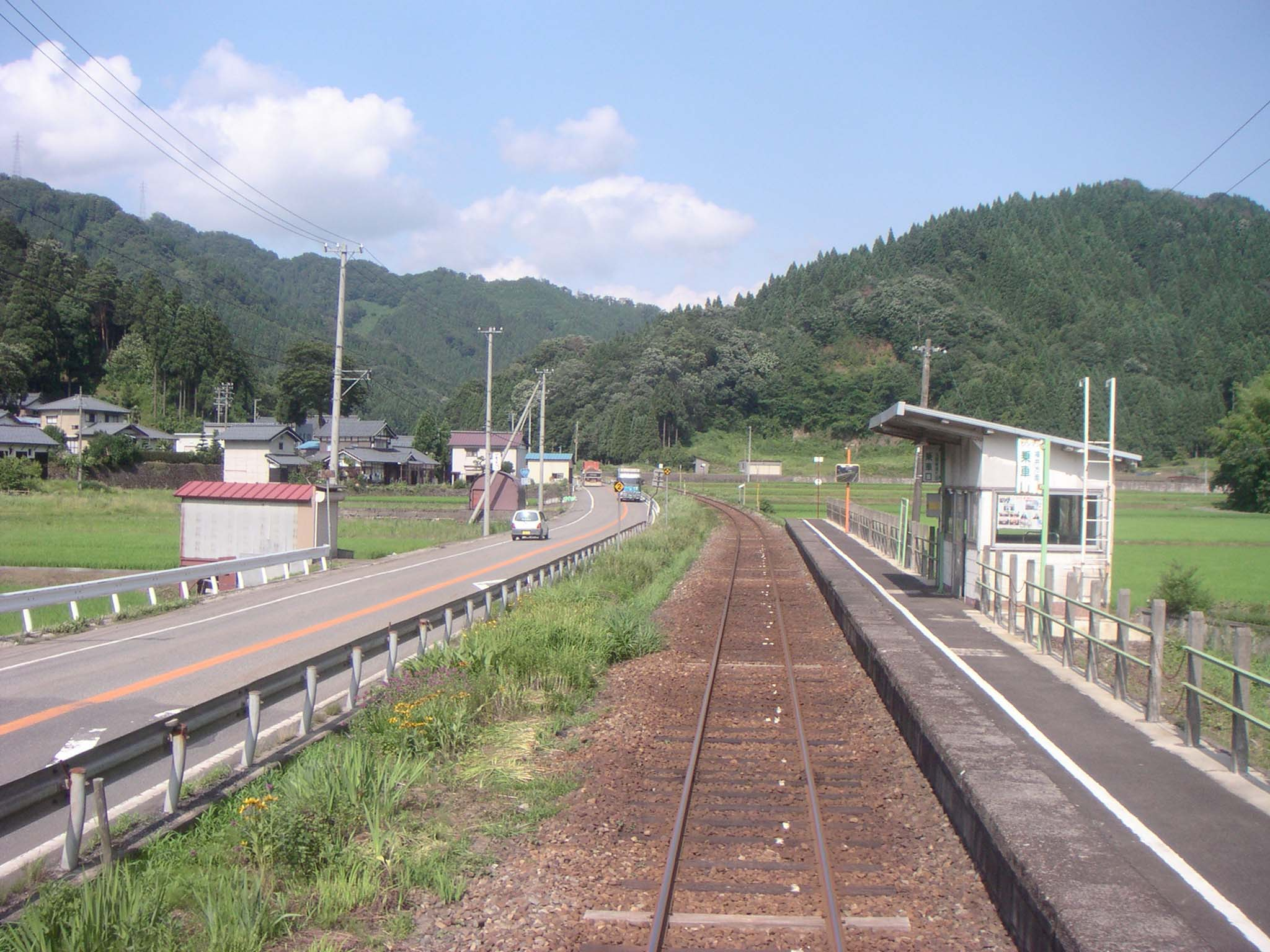
- Hakariishi Station and National Route 158 in August 2007

General information
- Location: 25 Hakariishi-chō, Fukui-shi, Fukui-ken 910-2331; Japan
- Coordinates: 35°59′51″N 136°26′04″E
- Operator: JR West
- Line: ■ Etsumi-Hoku Line (Kuzuryū Line)
- Distance: 24.4 km from Echizen-Hanandō
- Platforms: 1 side platform
- Tracks: 1

Other information
- Status: Unstaffed
- Website: Official website

History
- Opened: December 15, 1960

Passengers
- FY2015: 10
Location
- Location within Japan

Hakariishi Station (計石駅, Hakariishi-eki) is a JR West railway station in the city of Fukui, Fukui, Japan.

== Lines ==
Hakariishi Station is served by the Etsumi-Hoku Line and is located 24.7 kilometers from the terminus of the line at Echizen-Hanandō and 27.0 kilometers from Fukui.

== Station layout ==
The station consists of one ground-level side platform serving a single bi-directional track. There is no station building, but only a shelter on the platform. The station is unattended.

== Adjacent stations ==
| « | Service | » |
Etsumi Hoku Line
| Echizen-Ōmiya | Local | Ushigahara |

== History ==
Hakariishi Station opened on December 15, 1960. With the privatization of Japanese National Railways (JNR) on 1 April 1987, the station came under the control of JR West.

== Surrounding area ==
- National Route 158
- Joren-ji

== See also ==
- List of railway stations in Japan
