= Etsumi-Hoku Line =

Railway line in Fukui prefecture, Japan

Etsumi-Hoku Line (Kuzuryū Line)
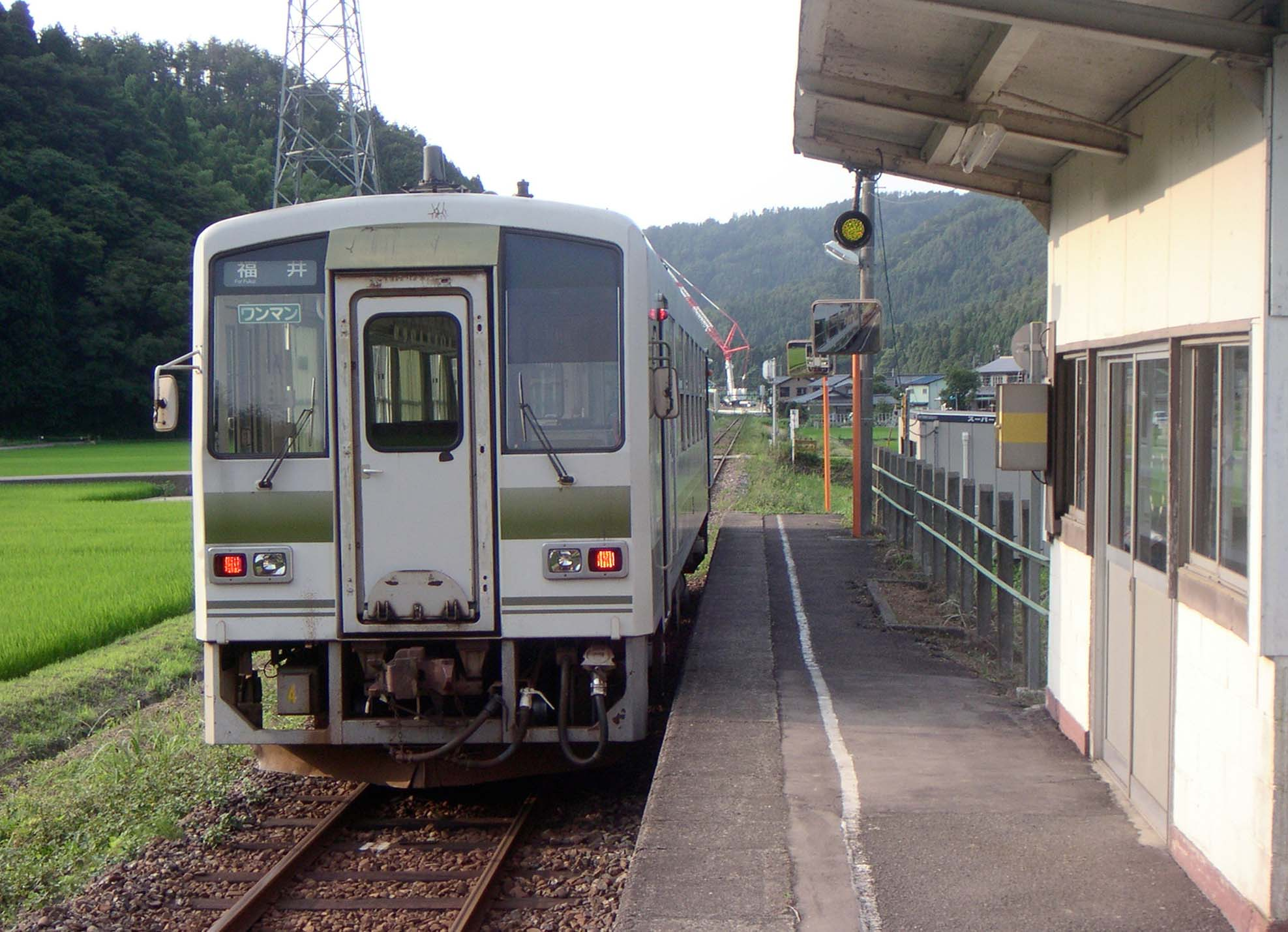
- A JR West KiHa 120 series DMU at Ichijōdani Station

Overview
- Native name: 越美北線
- Status: In operation
- Owner: JR West
- Locale: Fukui Prefecture
- Termini: Echizen-Hanandō; Kuzuryūko
- Stations: 22

Service
- Type: Heavy rail
- Operator: JR West
- Rolling stock: KiHa 120 series DMU

History
- Opened: 1960

Technical
- Line length: 52.5 km (32.6 mi)
- Num of tracks: Entire line single tracked
- Character: Rural
- Track gauge: 1,067 mm (3 ft 6 in)
- Electrification: None
- Operating speed: 85 km/h (53 mph)
Route map

The Etsumi-Hoku Line (越美北線, Etsumi Hoku-sen; "Etsumi North Line"), also called the Kuzuryū Line (九頭竜線, Kuzuryū-sen), is a railway line operated by West Japan Railway Company (JR West) in Fukui Prefecture, Japan. The line extends 52.5 km (32.6 mi) from Echizen-Hanandō Station in Fukui to Kuzuryūko Station in Ōno with a total of 22 stations.

The line was originally planned to connect to what is now Nagaragawa Railway's Etsumi-Nan Line, but the last 24.0 km (14.9 mi) section that would have involved extensive tunneling was never commenced. A bus service provided a connection between the two lines until it ceased in 2002.

== Route data ==
- Operating Company:
  - West Japan Railway Company (Services and tracks)
- Distance:
  - Echizen-Hanandō — Kuzuryūko: 52.5 km / 32.6 mi.
- Gauge: 1,067 mm (3 ft 6 in)
- Stations: 22
- Double-tracking: None
- Electrification: Not electrified
- Railway signalling:
  - Echizen-Hanandō — Echizen-Ōno: Simplified automatic
  - Echizen-Ōno — Kuzuryūko Station: Staff token

== Stations ==
- All trains stop at all stations.
- Between Echizen-Hanandō and Fukui trains run on the Hapi-Line Fukui Line (formerly Hokuriku Main Line).
- All stations located in Fukui Prefecture.

Station	Japanese	Distance (km)		Transfers	Tracks	Location
Station	Japanese	Between stations	From Echizen-Hanandō	Transfers	Tracks	Location
Hapi-Line Fukui Line
Fukui	福井駅	-	2.6	■ Hapi-Line Fukui Line (for Kanazawa); Echizen Railway Katsuyama Eiheiji Line; Echizen Railway Mikuni Awara Line; Fukui Railway Fukubu Line (Fukui-eki)	∥	Fukui
Etsumi-Hoku Line
Echizen-Hanandō	越前花堂駅	2.6	0.0	■ Hapi-Line Fukui Line (for Tsuruga)	Y	Fukui
Rokujō	六条駅	2.3	2.3		｜	Fukui
Asuwa	足羽駅	1.4	3.7		｜	Fukui
Echizen-Tōgō	越前東郷駅	2.0	5.7		｜	Fukui
Ichijōdani	一乗谷駅	2.6	8.3		｜	Fukui
Echizen-Takada	越前高田駅	3.1	11.4		｜	Fukui
Ichinami	市波駅	1.2	12.6		｜	Fukui
Kowashōzu	小和清水駅	2.0	14.6		｜	Fukui
Miyama	美山駅	2.9	17.5		◇	Fukui
Echizen-Yakushi	越前薬師駅	2.0	19.5		｜	Fukui
Echizen-Ōmiya	越前大宮駅	2.7	22.2		｜	Fukui
Hakariishi	計石駅	2.2	24.4		｜	Fukui
Ushigahara	牛ヶ原駅	3.2	27.6		｜	Ōno
Kita-Ōno	北大野駅	1.8	29.4		｜	Ōno
Echizen-Ōno	越前大野駅	2.0	31.4		◇	Ōno
Echizen-Tano	越前田野駅	2.9	34.3		｜	Ōno
Echizen-Tomida	越前富田駅	1.4	35.7		｜	Ōno
Shimoyuino	下唯野駅	3.1	38.8		｜	Ōno
Kakigashima	柿ヶ島駅	1.0	39.8		｜	Ōno
Kadohara	勝原駅	2.5	42.3		｜	Ōno
Echizen-Shimoyama	越前下山駅	6.5	48.8		｜	Ōno
Kuzuryūko	九頭竜湖駅	3.7	52.5		｜	Ōno

Legend

- ◇ - stations with passing loops
- ∥ - double-tracked section
- ｜- single-tracked section
- Y - junction station

== History ==
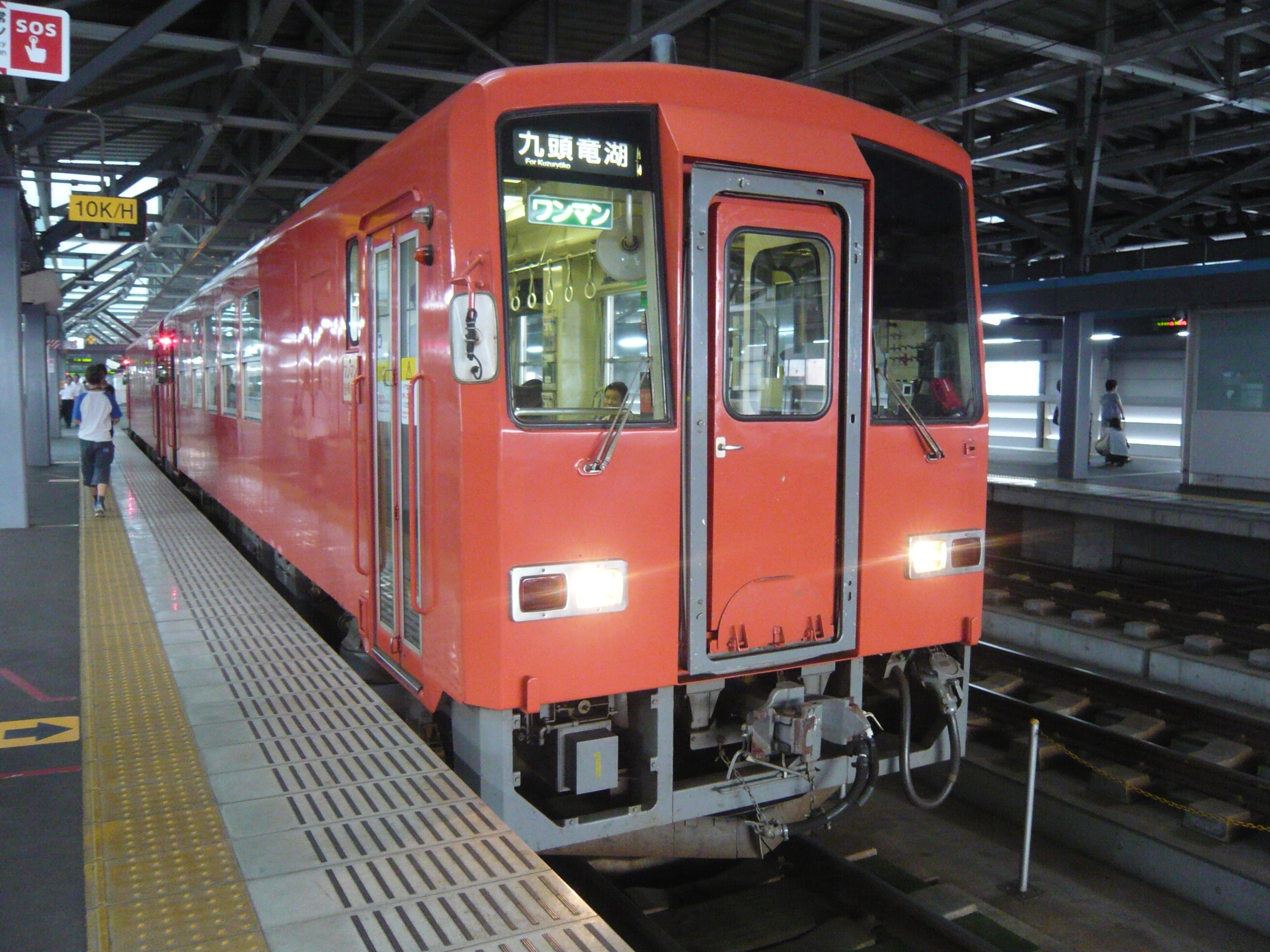
A KiHa 120 DMU at Fukui Station

- December 15, 1960: Minami-Fukui — Echizen-Hanandō — Kadohara section (43.1 km) opens. Freight operations begin between Minami-Fukui — Echizen-Ōno.
  - Echizen-Hanandō, Rokujō, Echizen-Tōgō, Ichijōdani, Ichinami, Kowashōzu, Miyama, Echizen-Yakushi, Echizen-Ōmiya, Hakariishi, Ushigahara, Echizen-Ōno, Echizen-Tomida, Shimo-Yuino, Kakigashima, and Kadohara stations open.
- May 20, 1964: Asuwa, Echizen-Takada, Echizen-Tano stations open.
- October 15, 1965: Freight operations begin between Echizen-Ōno — Kadohara.
- March 25, 1968: Kita-Ōno Station opens.
- October 1, 1968: Freight operations end at Kadohara Station.
- December 15, 1972: Extension from Kadohara to Kuzuryūko (10.2 km) opens, including the 5251m Arashima tunnel.
- April 1, 1973: Freight operations end between Echizen-Ōno — Echizen-Tomida.
- October 1980: Seasonal rapid train "Okuetsu-gō" begins operation.
- November 15, 1982: Freight operations end between Minami-Fukui — Echizen-Ōno, ending freight service on the entire line.
- April 1, 1987: With the breakup and privatization of Japan National Railways, line becomes part of West Japan Railway Company (JR West). Beginning of line moved 800 meters to Echizen-Hanandō Station.
- June 1, 1990: Driver-only operation begins.
- September 1, 1992: Regular rapid service begins.
- September 12, 1995: "Kuzuryū Line" name goes into use.
- September 1, 1997: Seasonal rapid train "Okuetsu-gō" ceases operation.
- March 3, 2001: Regular rapid service ends.
- July 18, 2004: Due to heavy rains, five railway bridges are washed away, forcing operations to stop.
- July 20, 2004: Service restored between Echizen-Ōno — Kuzuryūko.
- September 11, 2004: Service restored between Echizen-Hanandō — Ichijōdani, Miyama — Echizen-Ōno.
- June 30, 2007: Service restored between Ichijōdani — Miyama, allowing full service on the line to resume.

== See also ==
- List of railway lines in Japan
