= Echizen-Ōno Station =

Railway station in Ōno, Fukui Prefecture, Japan

Echizen-Ono Station 越前大野駅
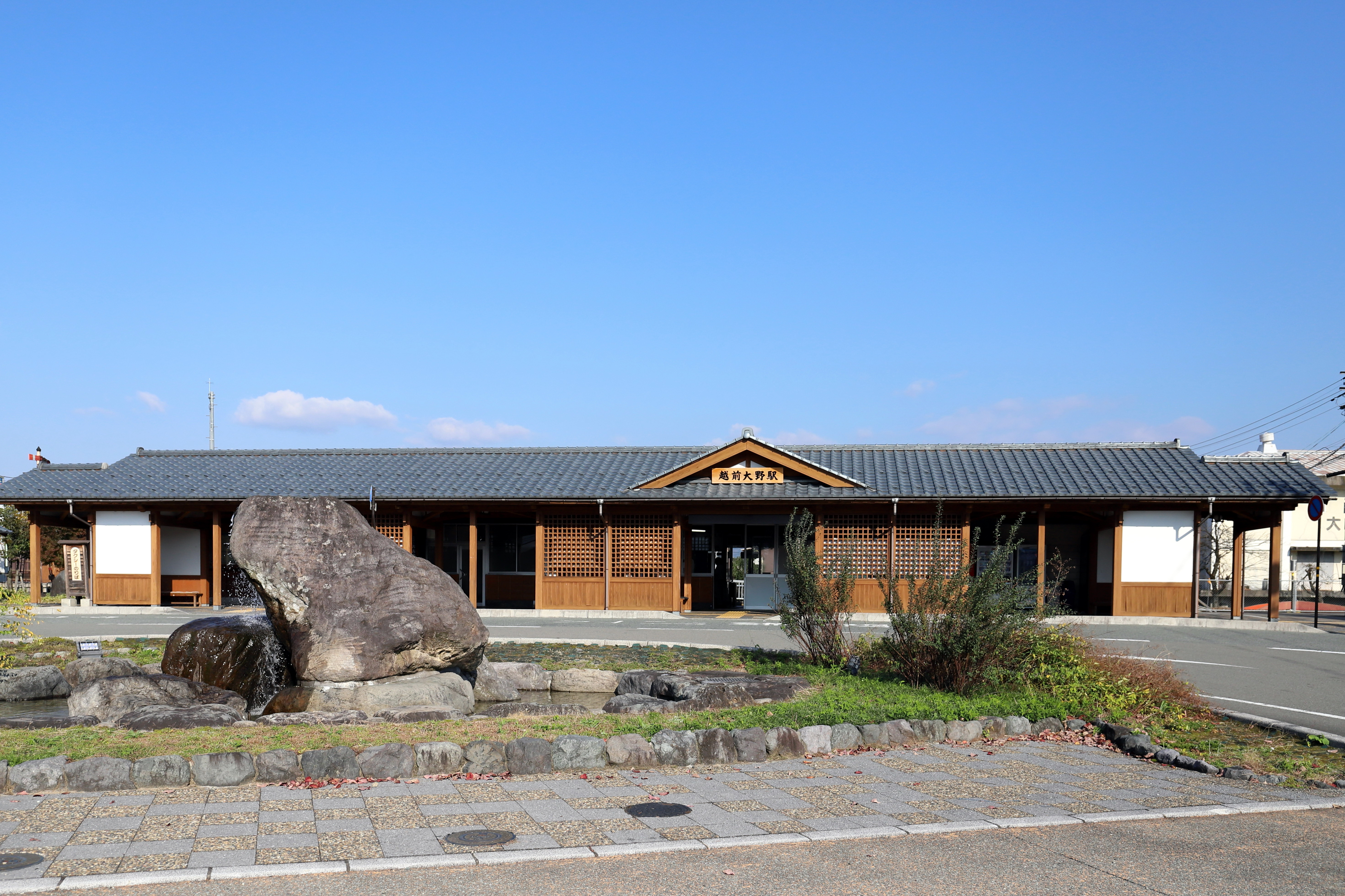
- Echizen-Ono Station in November 2017

General information
- Location: 1-16 Yayoi-cho, Ono-shi, Fukui-ken 912-0052; Japan
- Coordinates: 35°59′00″N 136°29′49″E
- Operator: JR West
- Line: ■ Etsumi-Hoku Line
- Distance: 32.2 km from Minami-Fukui
- Platforms: 1 island platform
- Tracks: 2

Other information
- Status: Staffed ("Midori no Madoguchi")
- Website: Official website

History
- Opened: 15 December 1960
Location
- Location within Japan

Echizen-Ono Station (越前大野駅, Echizen-Ōno-eki) is a railway station on the Etsumi-Hoku Line in the city of Ōno, Fukui, Japan, operated by West Japan Railway Company (JR West).

== Lines ==
Echizen-Ono Station is served by the 52.5 km Etsumi-Hoku Line, and lies 32.2 km from the starting point of the line at Minami-Fukui.

== Layout ==
The station has one island platform with tracks, connected to the station building with a level crossing, and some side tracks without a platform. The station has a "Midori no Madoguchi" staffed ticket office.

=== Platforms ===
1	■ Etsumi-Hoku Line	for Fukui
2	■ Etsumi-Hoku Line	for Fukui and Kuzuryūko

== Adjacent stations ==
«	Service	»
Etsumi Hoku Line
Kita-Ōno	Local	Echizen-Tano

== History ==
The station opened on 15 December 1960. With the privatization of Japanese National Railways (JNR) on 1 April 1987, the station came under the control of JR West.

== Surrounding area ==
- Ōno city hall
- Ōno Castle (Echizen Province)

== See also ==
- List of railway stations in Japan
