= Kuzuryūko Station =

Railway station in Ōno, Fukui Prefecture, Japan

Kuzuryūko Station 九頭竜湖駅
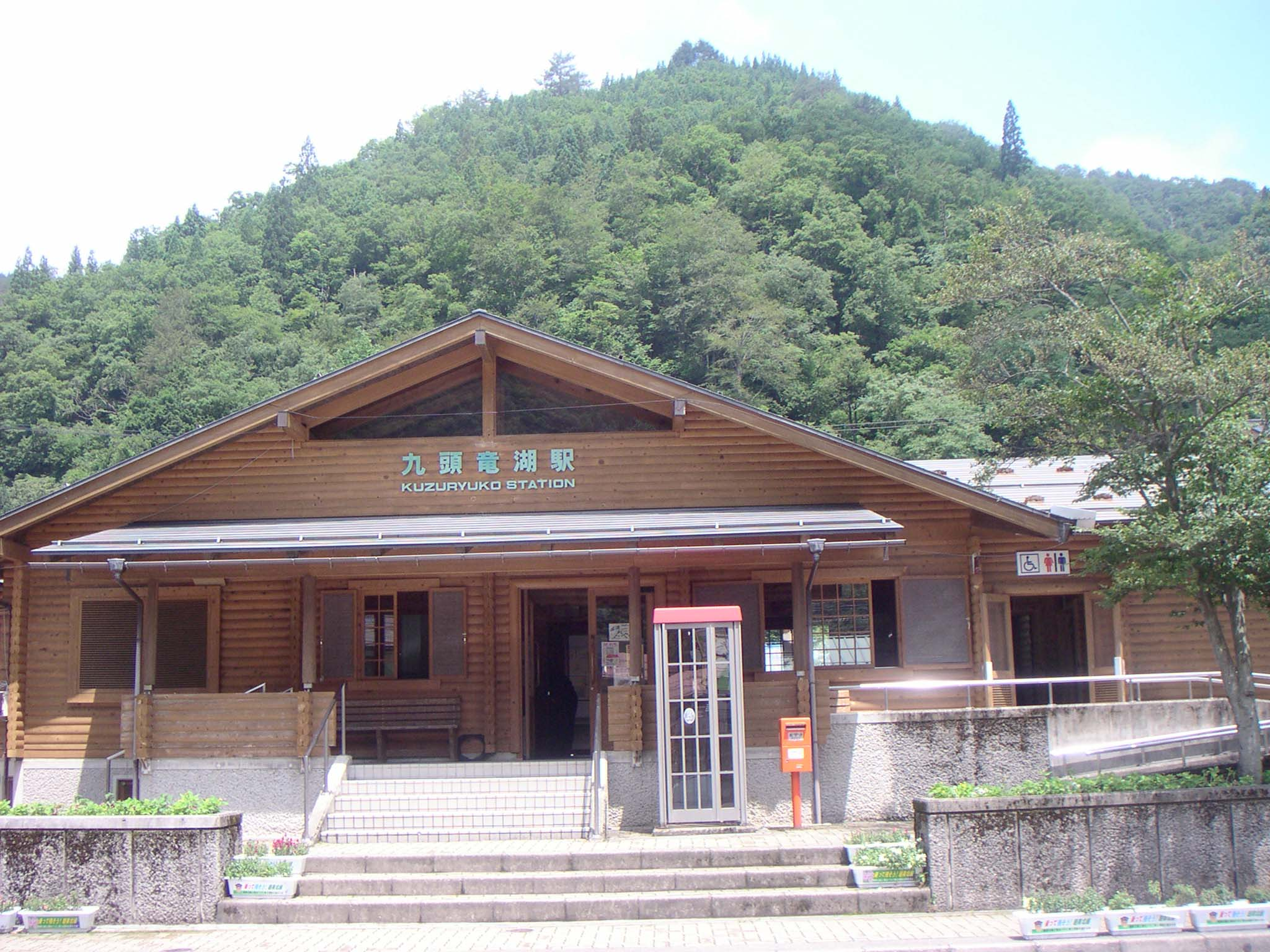
- Kuzuryūko Station in August 2009

General information
- Location: 26-168 Asahi, Ōno-shi, Fukui-ken 912-0205; Japan
- Coordinates: 35°54′16.2″N 136°39′42.11″E
- Operator: JR West
- Line: ■ Etsumi-Hoku Line (Kuzuryū Line)
- Distance: 52.5 km from Echizen-Hanandō
- Platforms: 1 side platform
- Tracks: 1

Other information
- Status: Staffed

History
- Opened: December 15, 1972

Passengers
- 2020: 10 (daily average)
Location
- Location within Japan

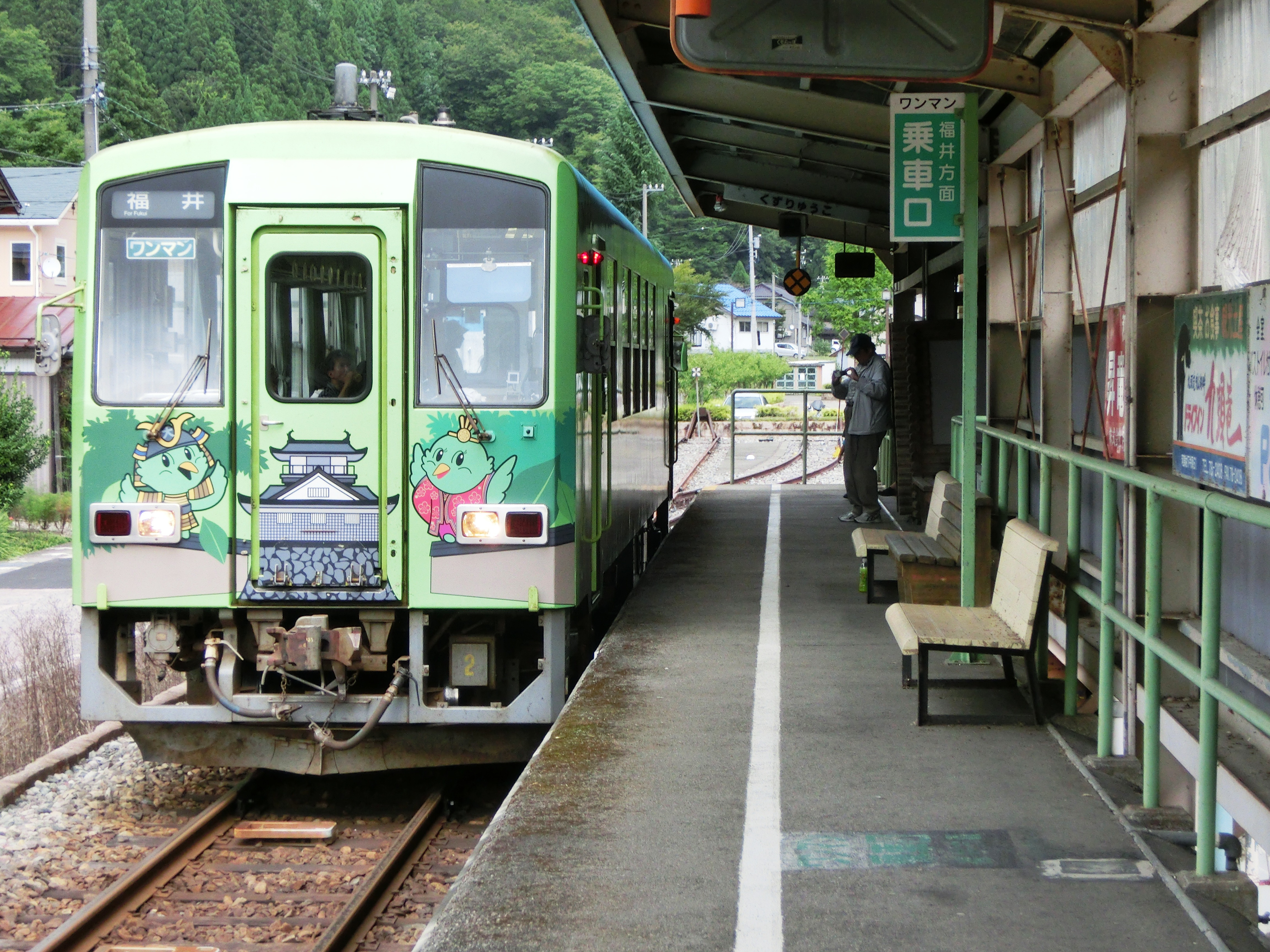
Platform (2012)

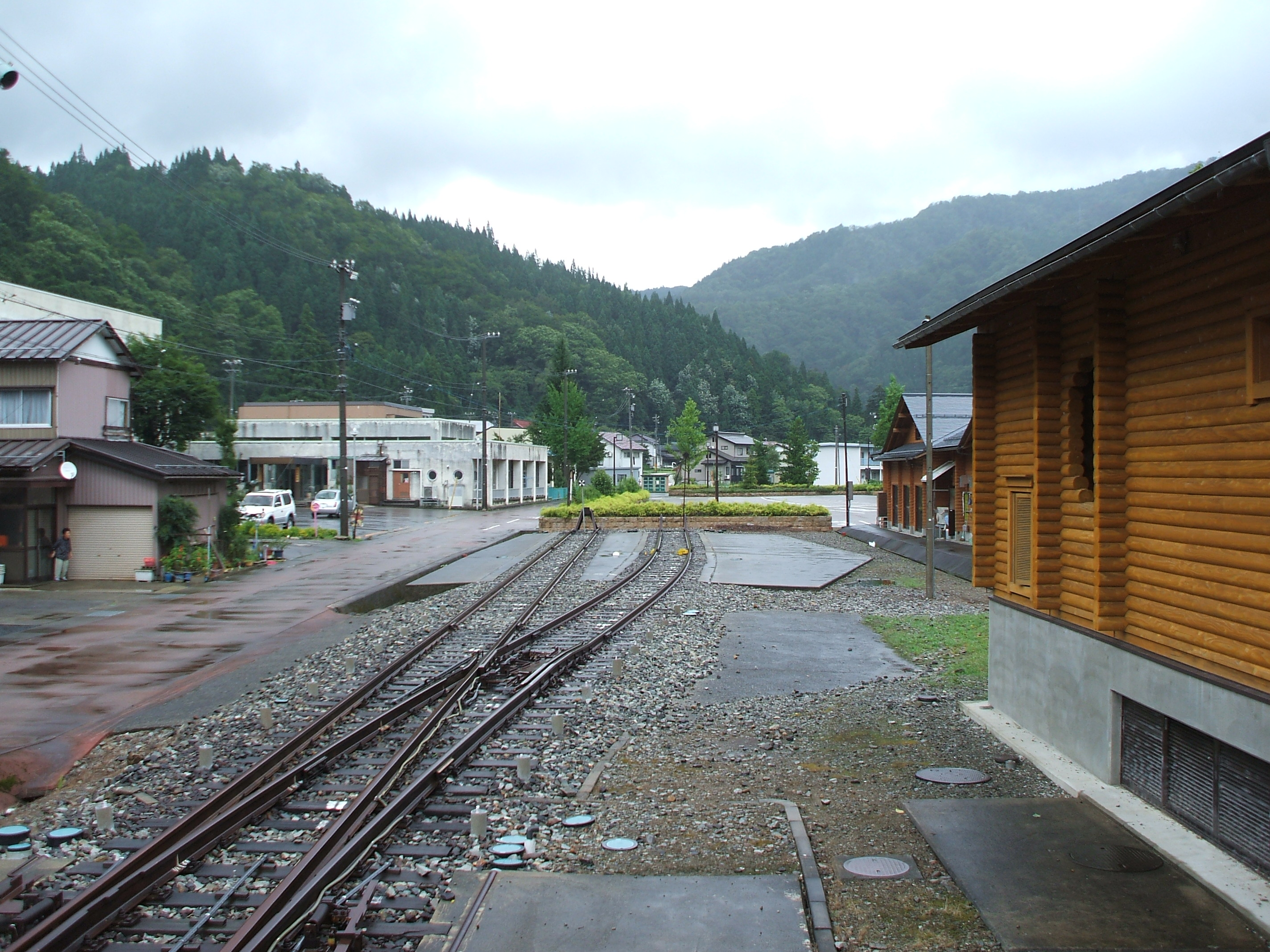
End of Etsumi-Hoku Line.

Kuzuryūko Station (九頭竜湖駅, Kuzuryūko-eki) is a JR West railway station in the city of Ōno, Fukui, Japan.

== Lines ==
Kuzuryūko Station is the terminal station of the Etsumi-Hoku Line, and is located 52.5 kilometers from the terminus of the line at Echizen-Hanandō and 55.1 kilometers from Fukui.

== Station layout ==
The station consists of one dead-headed side platform serving single bi-directional track. The log cabin style station building is staffed.

== Adjacent stations ==
«	Service	»
Etsumi Hoku Line
Echizen-Shimoyama	Local	Terminus

== History ==
Kuzuryūko Station opened on December 15, 1972. With the privatization of Japanese National Railways (JNR) on 1 April 1987, the station came under the control of JR West. The station was closed from July 2004 to July 2007 due to damage from torrential rains.

== Surrounding area ==
- Kuzuryu Dam
- former Izumi Village Hall
- National Route 158

== See also ==
- List of railway stations in Japan
