= KiHa 120 =

Japanese train type

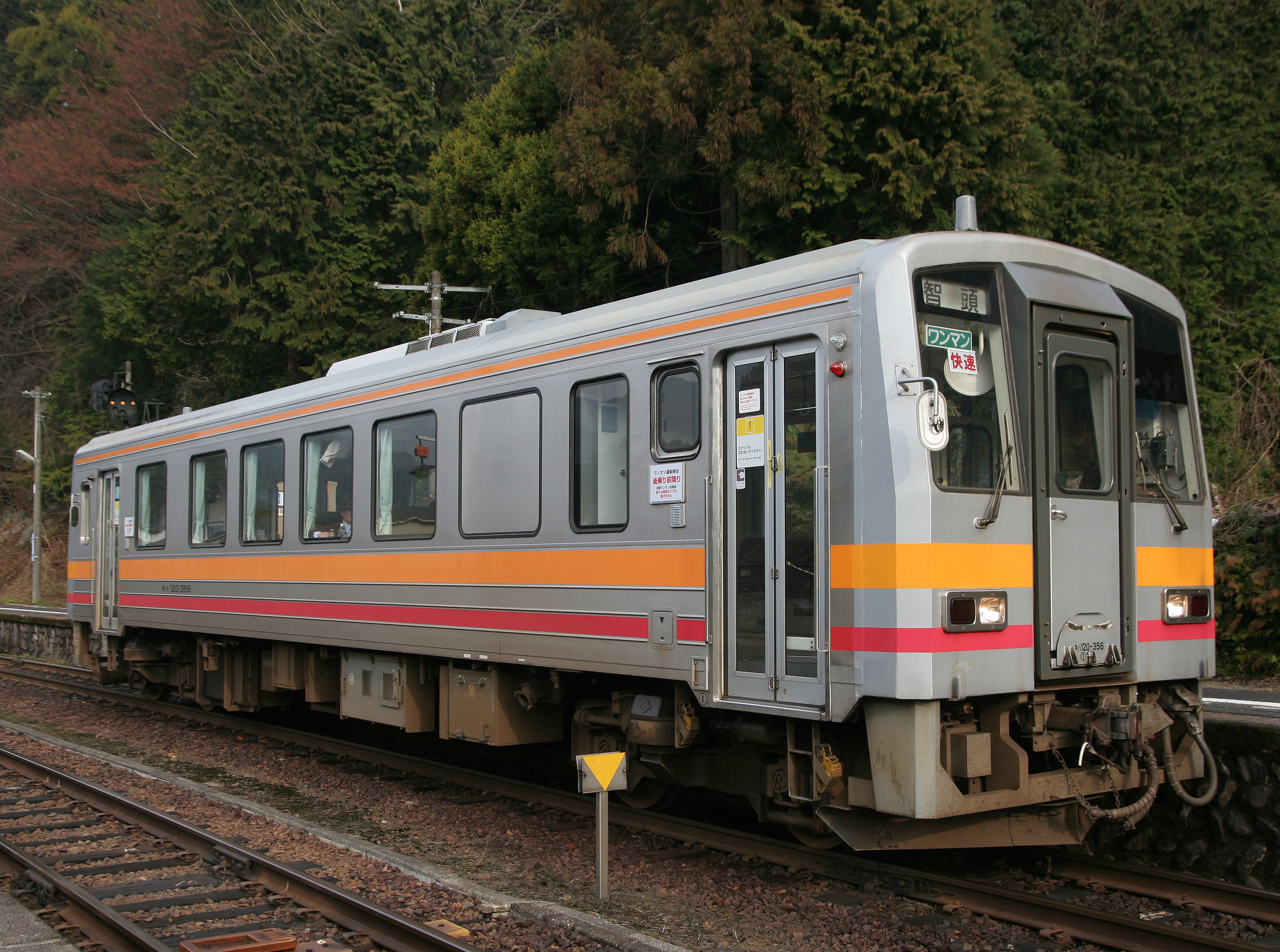
- Okayama-based KiHa 120-300 on the Inbi Line in April 2009
- Manufacturers: JR-West (Gotō Works), Niigata Tekko
- Constructed: 1991–1996
- Entered service: March 1992
- Refurbished: 2017-
- Number built: 89 vehicles
- Number in service: 88 vehicles
- Number scrapped: 1 vehicle (KiHa 120-358, accident damage)
- Formation: Single car unit
- Operator: JR-West
- Depots: Fukui, Hamada, Hiroshima, Kameyama, Kisuki, Okayama, Shimonoseki, Toyama
- Line served: Various

Specifications
- Car body construction: Steel (KiHa 120-200); Stainless steel (KiHa 120-0/300)
- Car length: 16,300 mm (53 ft 6 in)
- Width: 2,998 mm (9 ft 10.0 in) (KiHa 120-200); 3,188 mm (10 ft 5.5 in) (KiHa 120-0/300)
- Doors: 2 folding doors per side
- Maximum speed: 95 km/h (59 mph)
- Weight: 26.9 t (KiHa 120-0); 25.9 t (KiHa 120-200); 27.7 t (KiHa 120-300)
- Prime mover: SA6D125H-1
- Power output: 250 hp (at 2,000 rpm) (KiHa 120-200); 330 hp (at 2,000 rpm) (KiHa 120-0/300)
- Transmission: Hydraulic
- Bogies: WDT53 (driving), WT237 (trailing)
- Braking systems: Engine brake, Air brake
- Safety system: ATS-SW
- Track gauge: 1,067 mm (3 ft 6 in)

The KiHa 120 (キハ120形, Kiha-120-gata) is a single-car diesel multiple unit (DMU) train type operated by West Japan Railway Company (JR-West) on its rural lines in Japan. Based on Niigata Tekkō's "NDC" lightweight diesel car design intended for third-sector operators (such as Matsuura Railway, Takachiho Railway, and Kumagawa Railway), a total of 89 cars were built, with the class divided into three sub-classes: KiHa 120-0, KiHa 120-200, and KiHa 120-300.

The "KiHa" designation derives from the classification system used by JNR. "Ki" indicates a diesel-powered vehicle, while "Ha" indicates an ordinary passenger car, as opposed to a green car.

== Variants ==
=== KiHa 120-200 ===
Eight first-batch cars were built in 1992. These had painted steel bodies, two-pane windows, transverse and longitudinal seating, and no toilets. All cars were later modified with the addition of toilets.

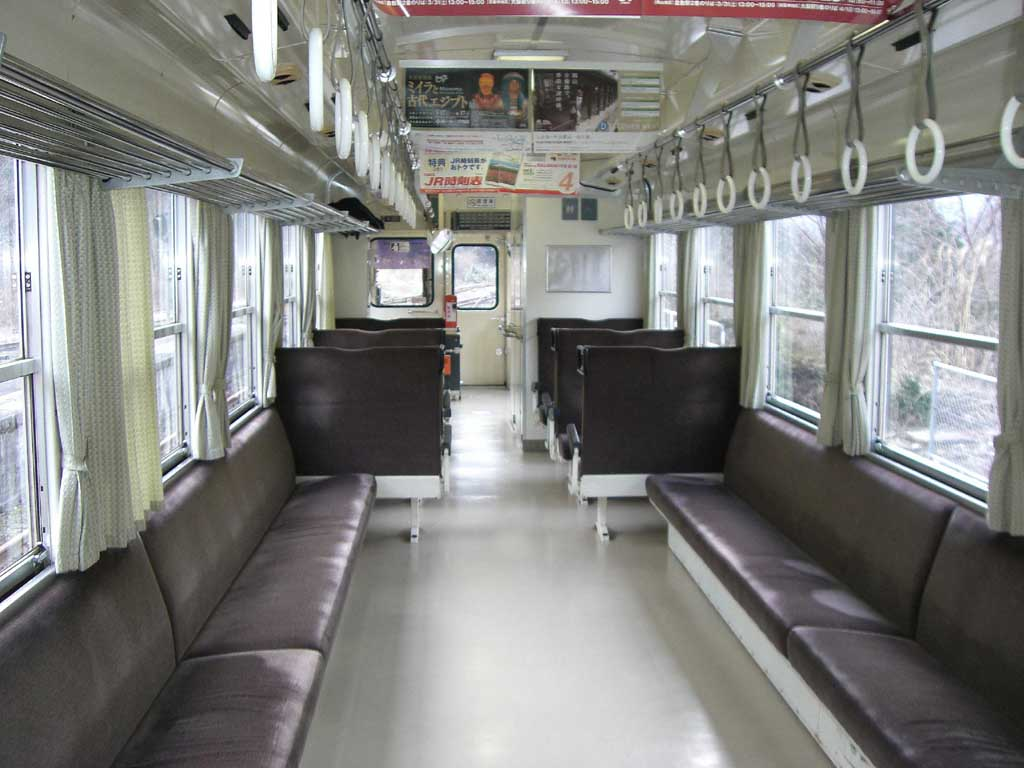
Interior view of KiHa 120-208 in March 2007

=== KiHa 120-0 ===
22 second-batch cars were built in 1993, including three cars built at JR-West's Gotō Works. These had uprated engines, stainless steel bodies, single-pane windows, longitudinal seating, and no toilets. All cars were later modified with the addition of toilets.

=== KiHa 120-300 ===
59 third-batch cars were built between 1994 and 1996, including 19 cars built at JR-West's Gotō Works. These were similar in design to the KiHa 120-0 subclass, but were built with some transverse seating. Although not initially built with toilets, all cars were modified with the addition of toilets from 2005.

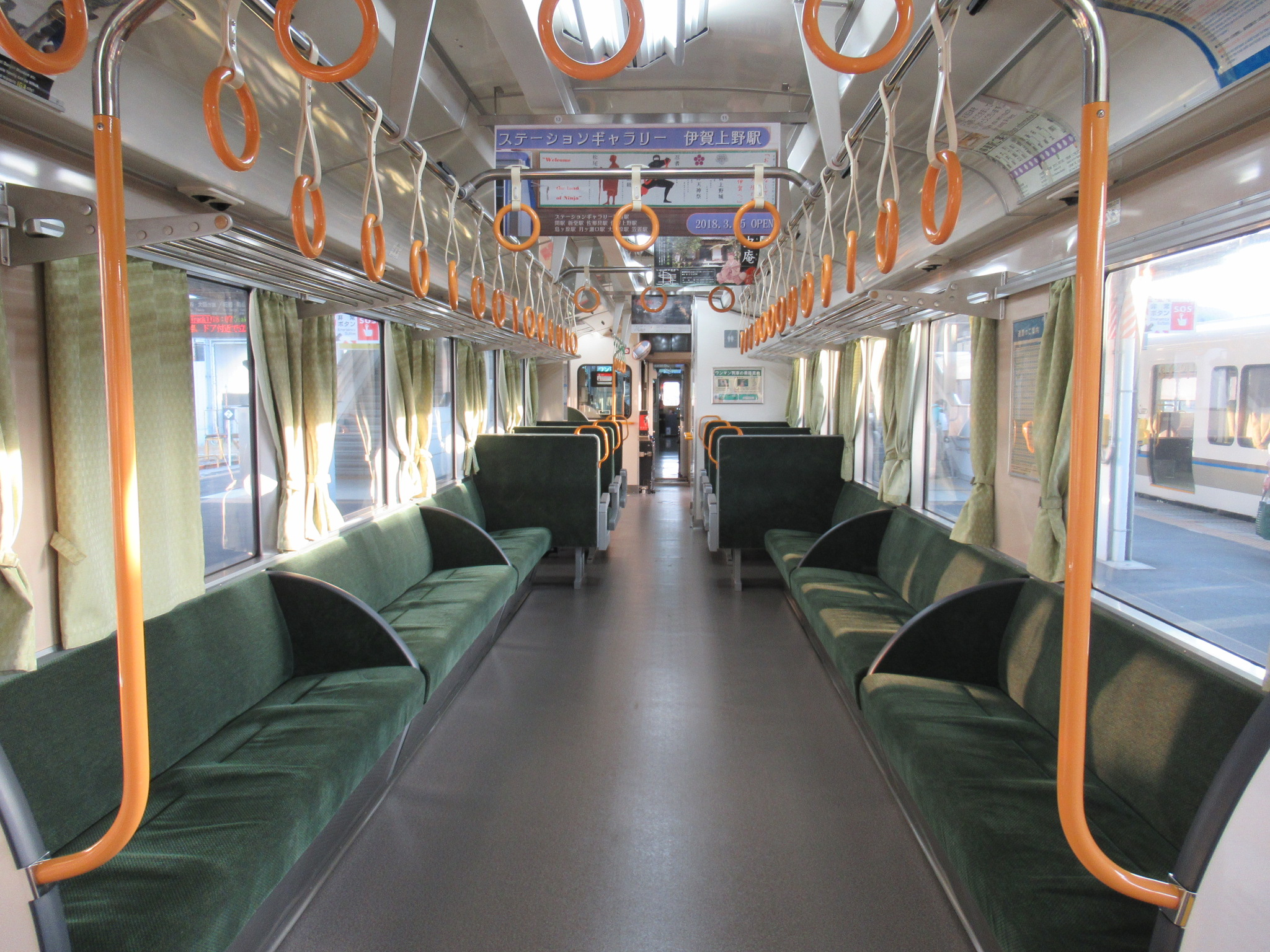
Interior of a refurbished car

== Livery variations ==
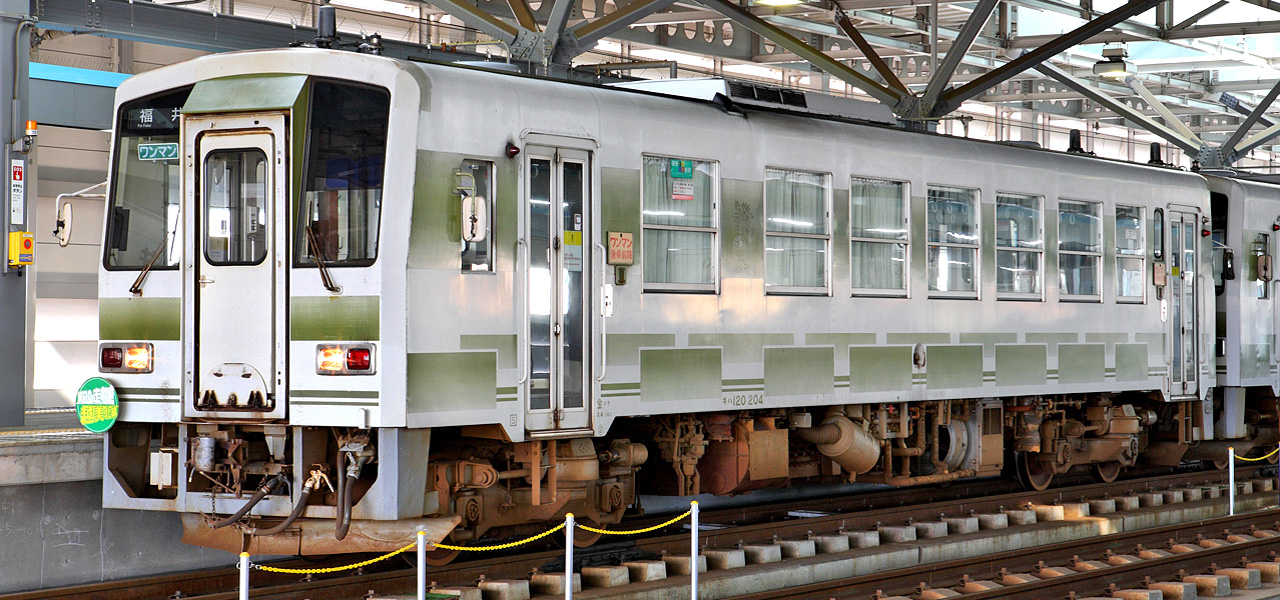
Fukui-based KiHa 120-205 in original livery in April 2008

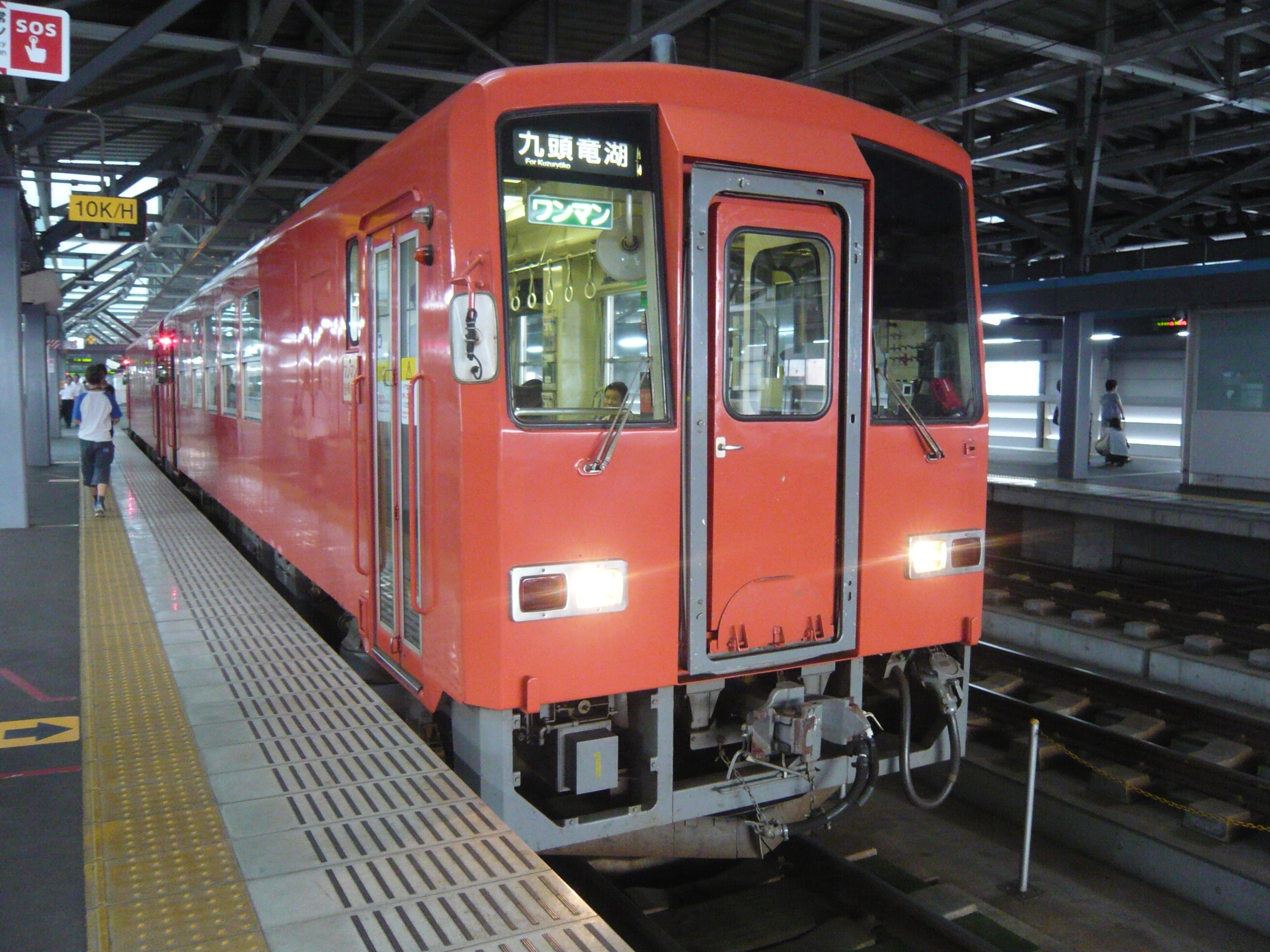
Fukui-based KiHa 120-201 in revised livery in August 2011

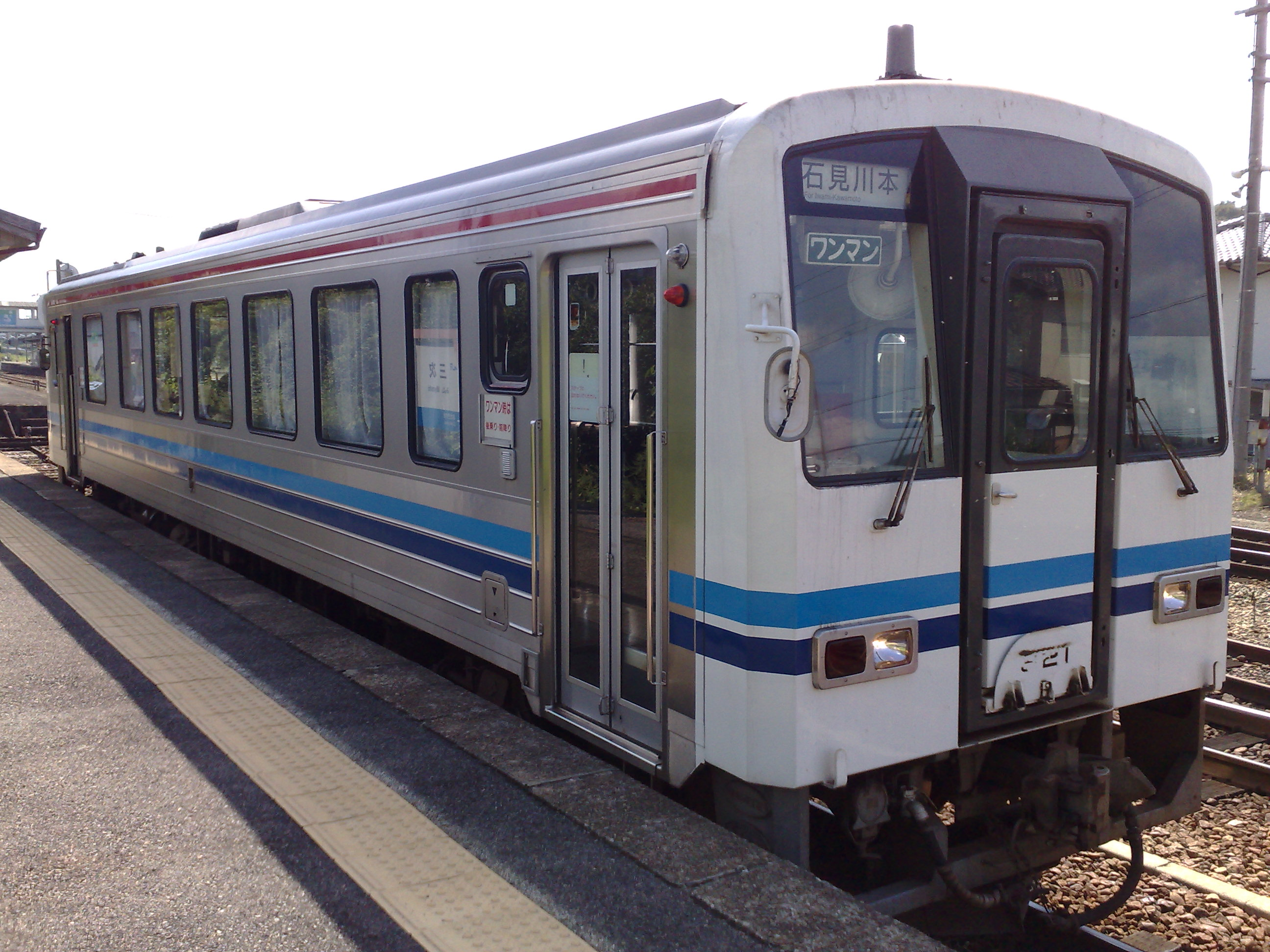
Hamada-based KiHa 120-321 in September 2008

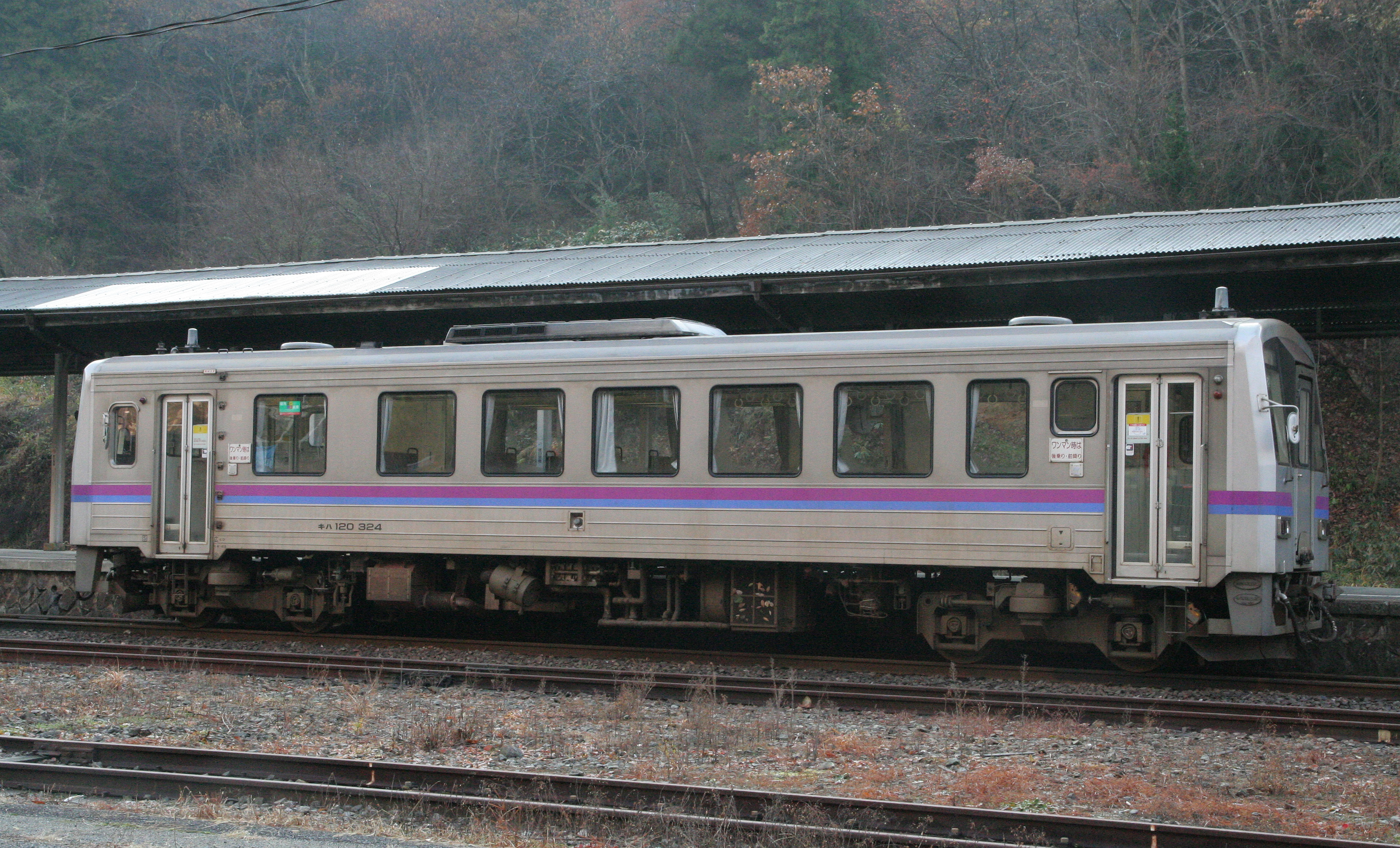
Hiroshima-based KiHa 120-324 in November 2008

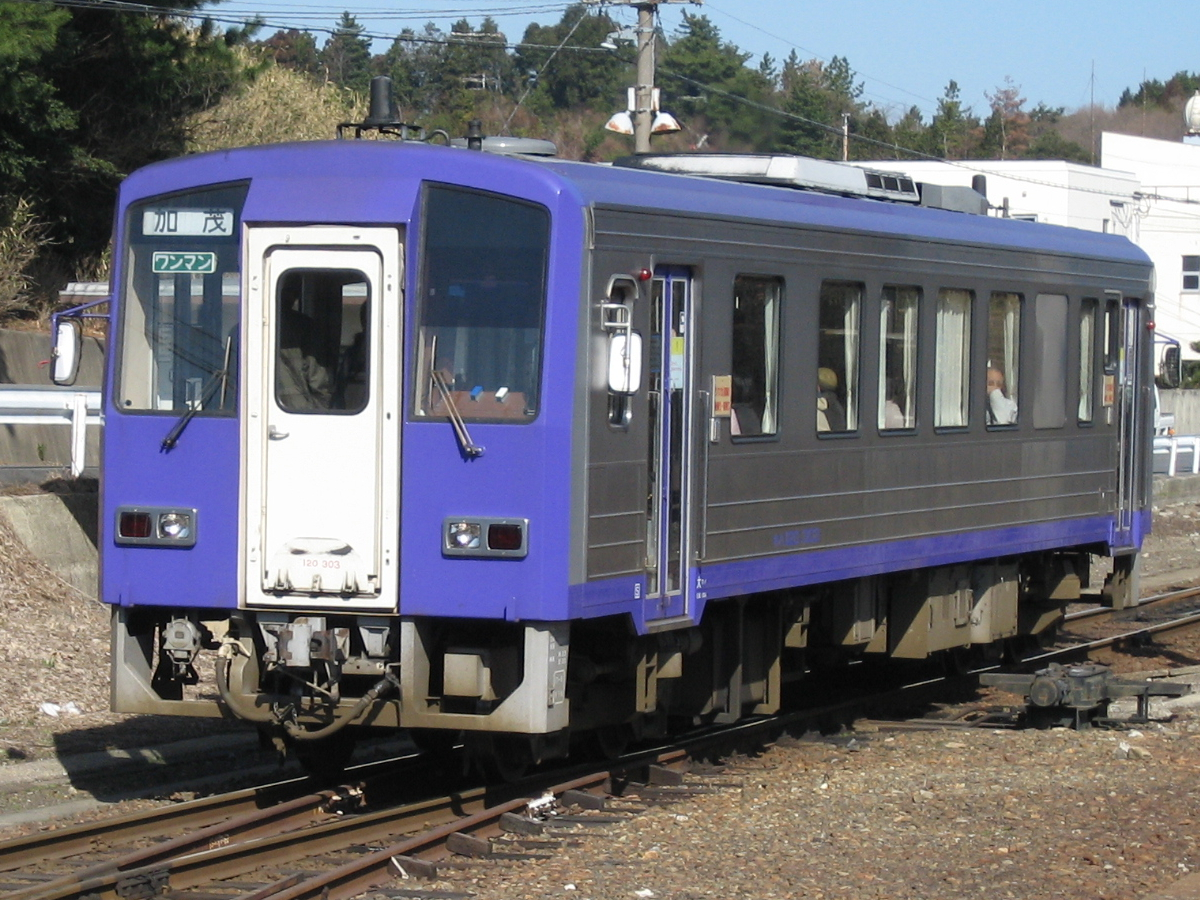
Kameyama-based KiHa 120-303 in March 2006

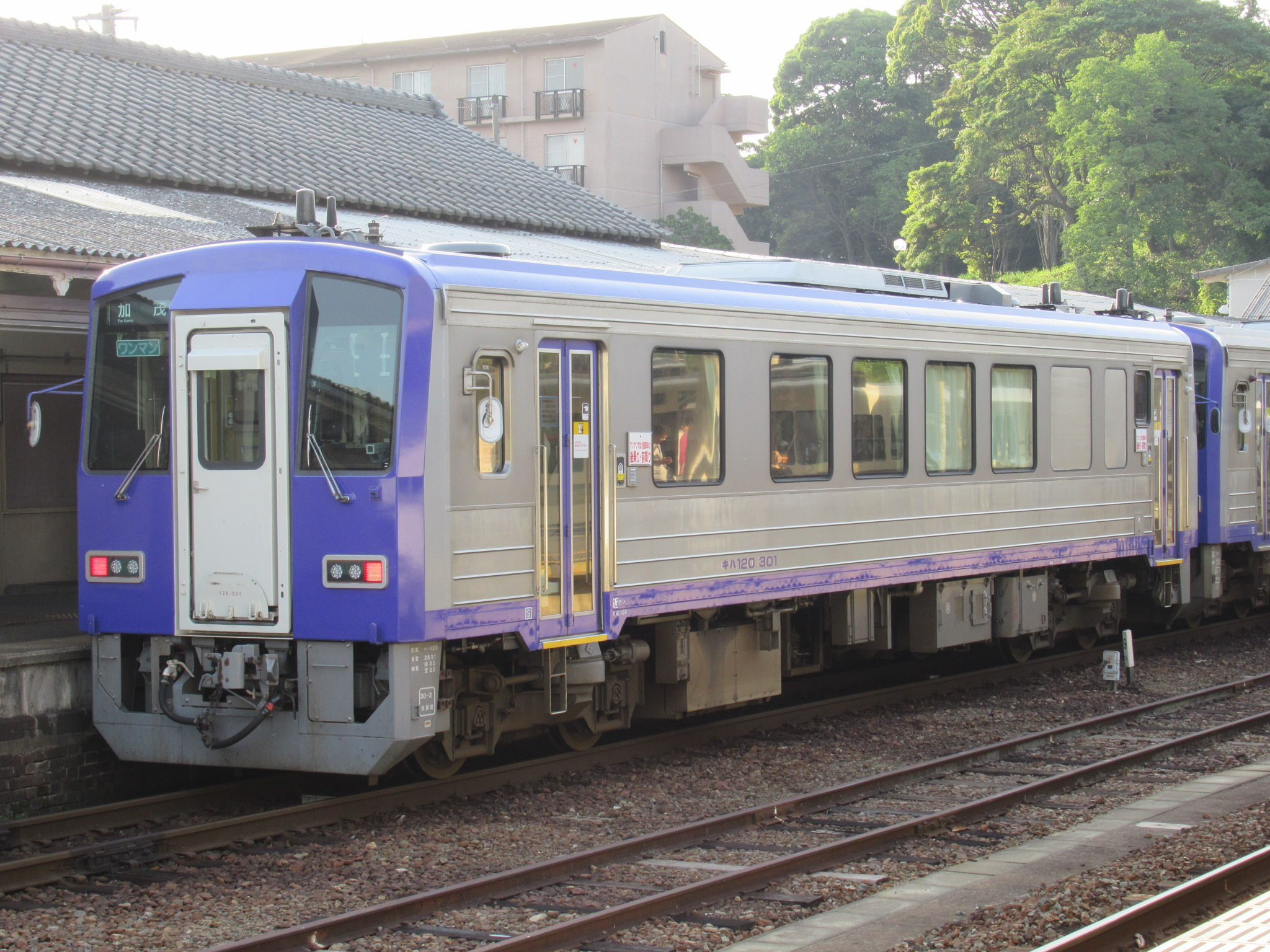
Kameyama-based KiHa 120-301 refurbished car in May 2018

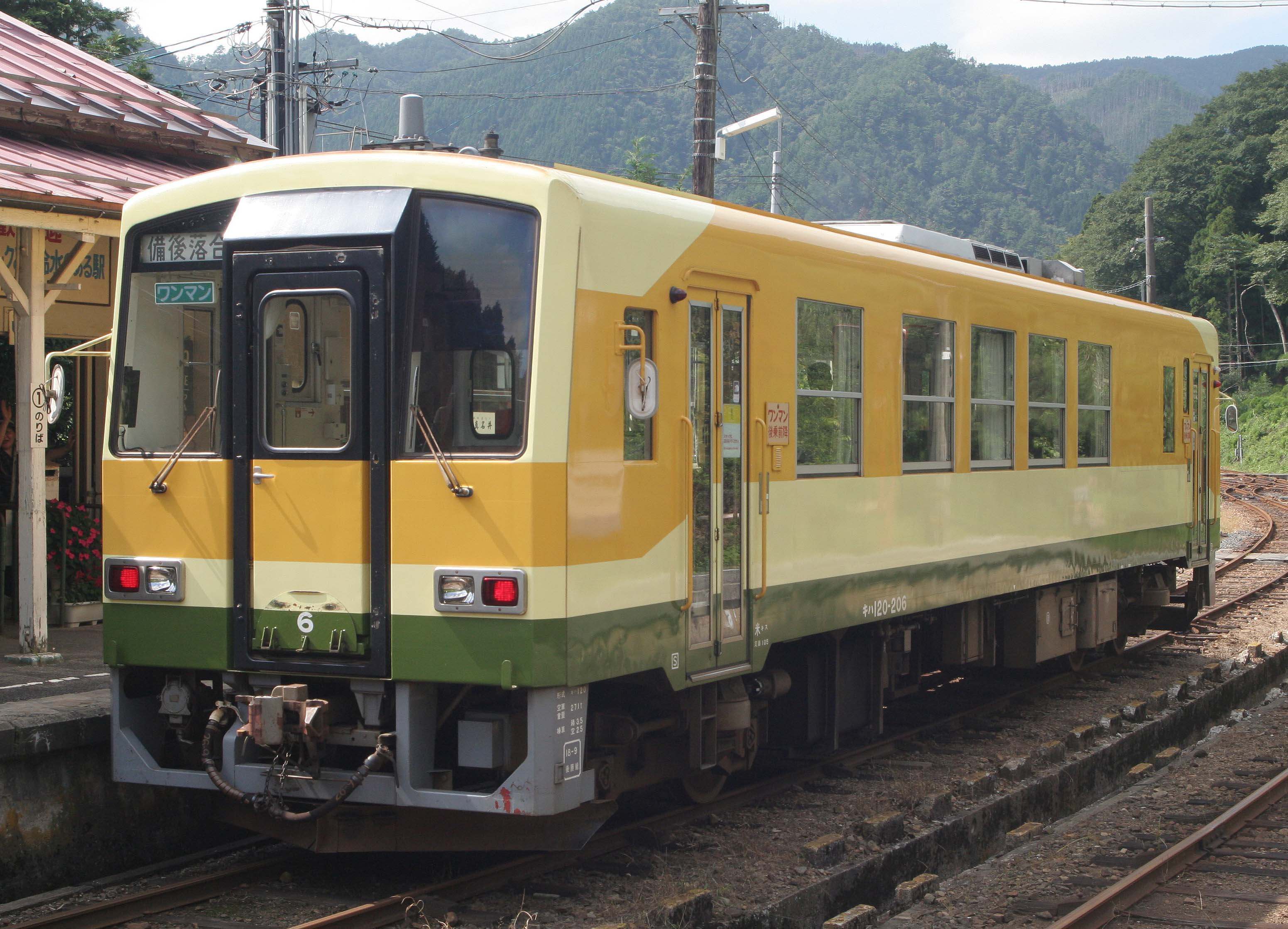
Kisuki-based KiHa 120-206 in original livery in September 2007

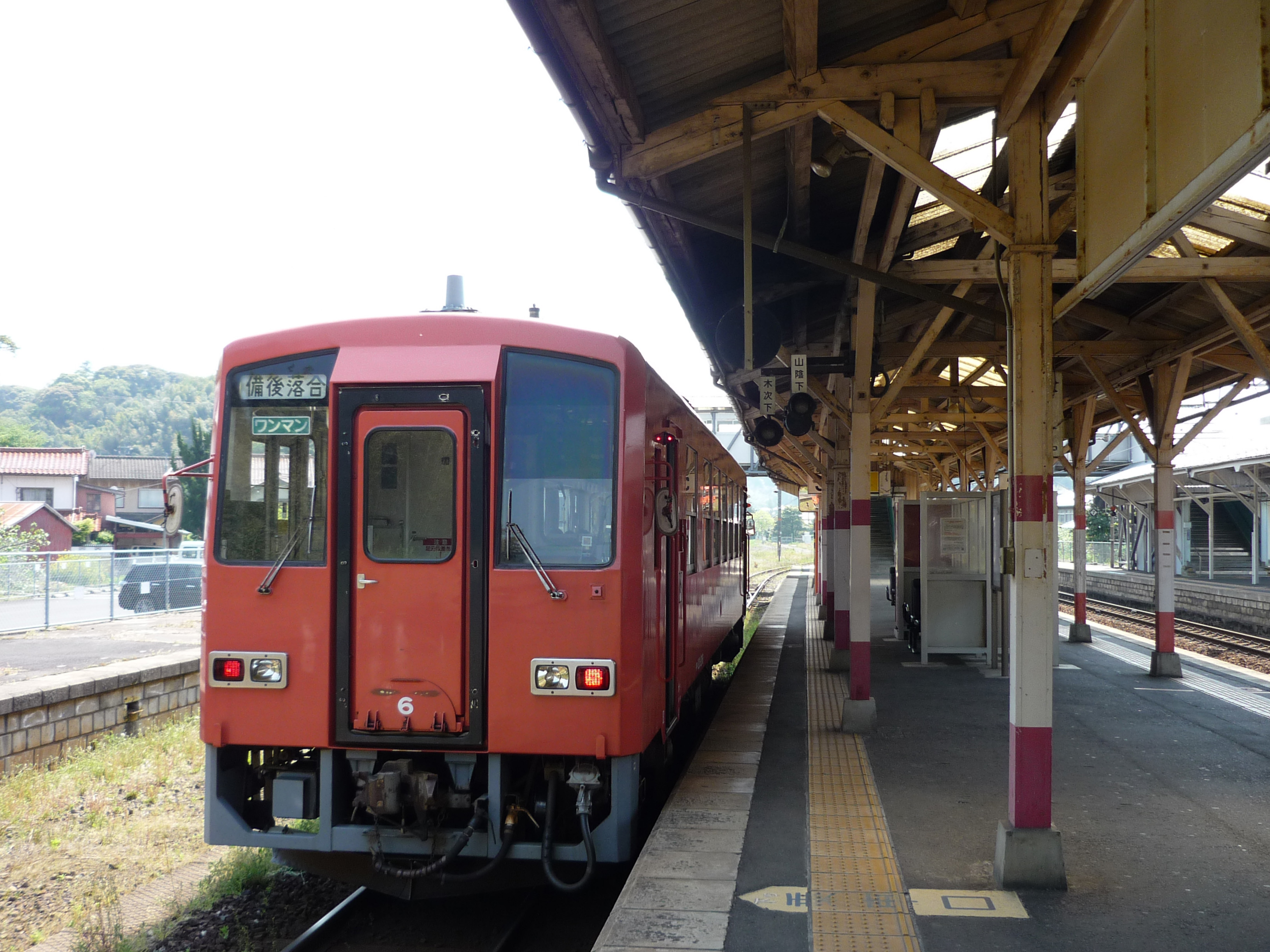
Kisuki-based KiHa 120-206 in revised livery in April 2017

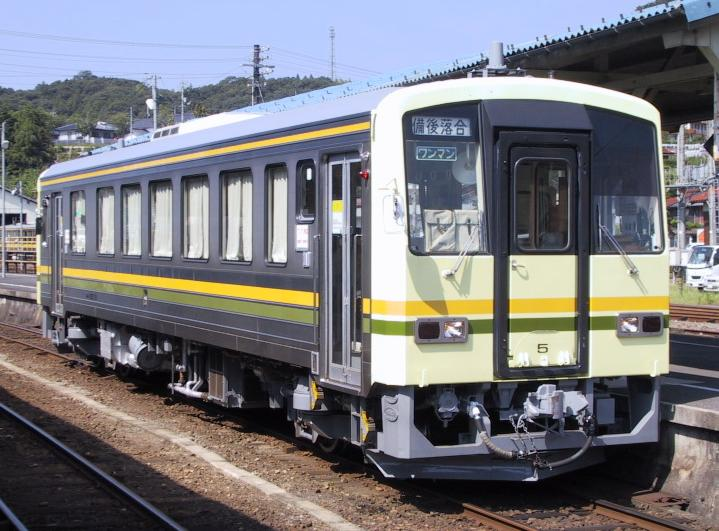
Kisuki-based KiHa 120-5

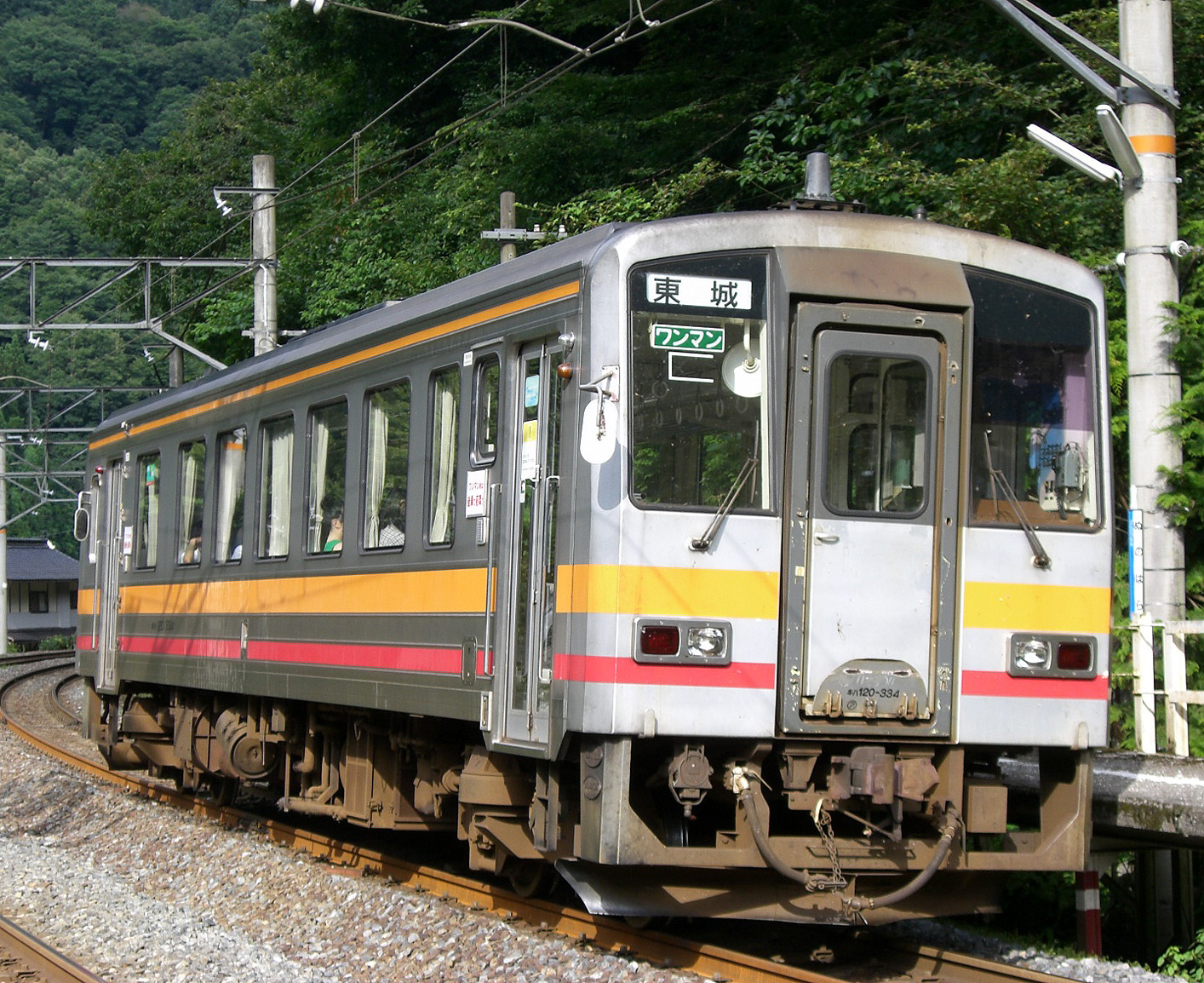
Okayama-based KiHa 120-334 in July 2006

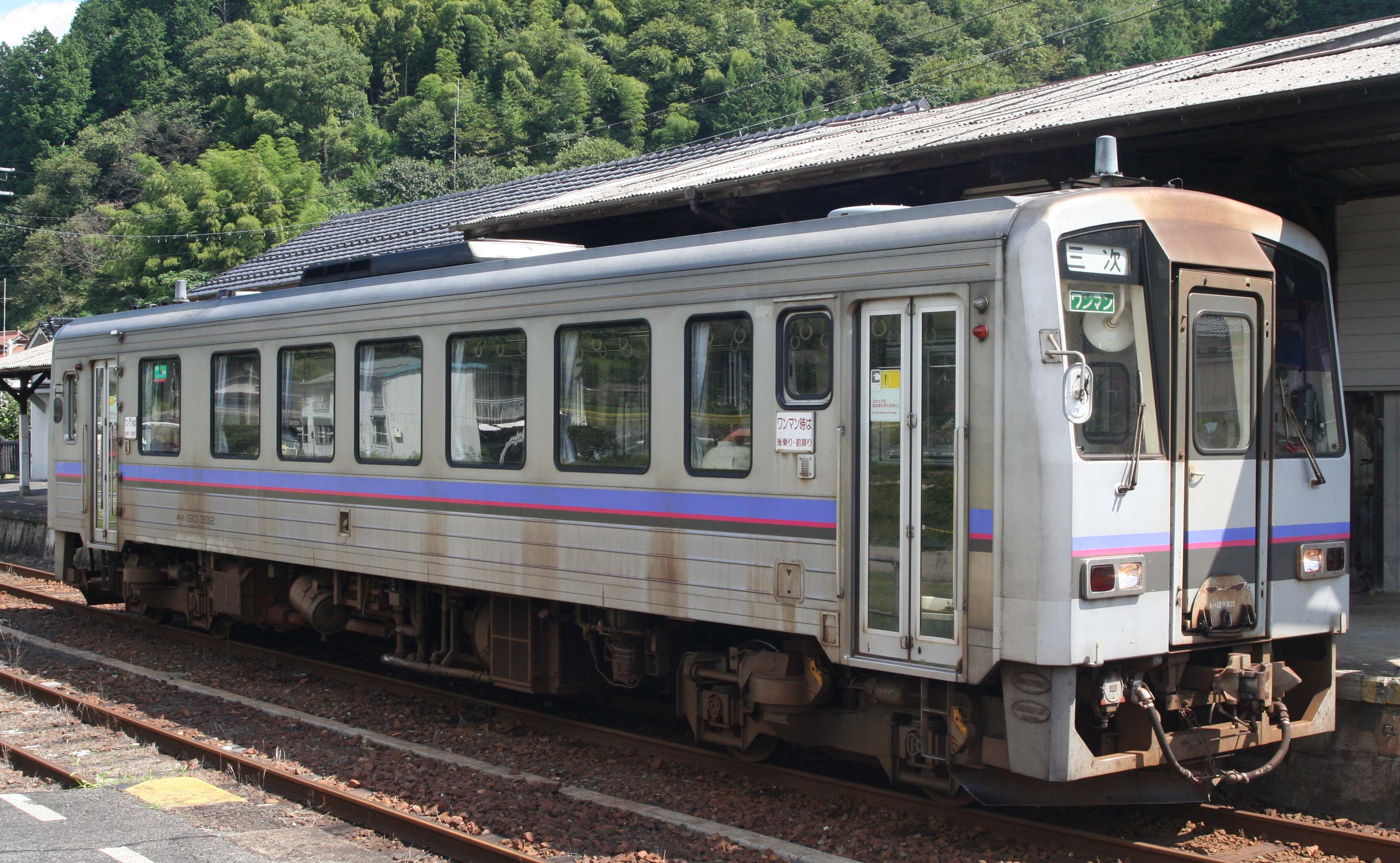
Shimonoseki-based KiHa 120-332 in September 2007

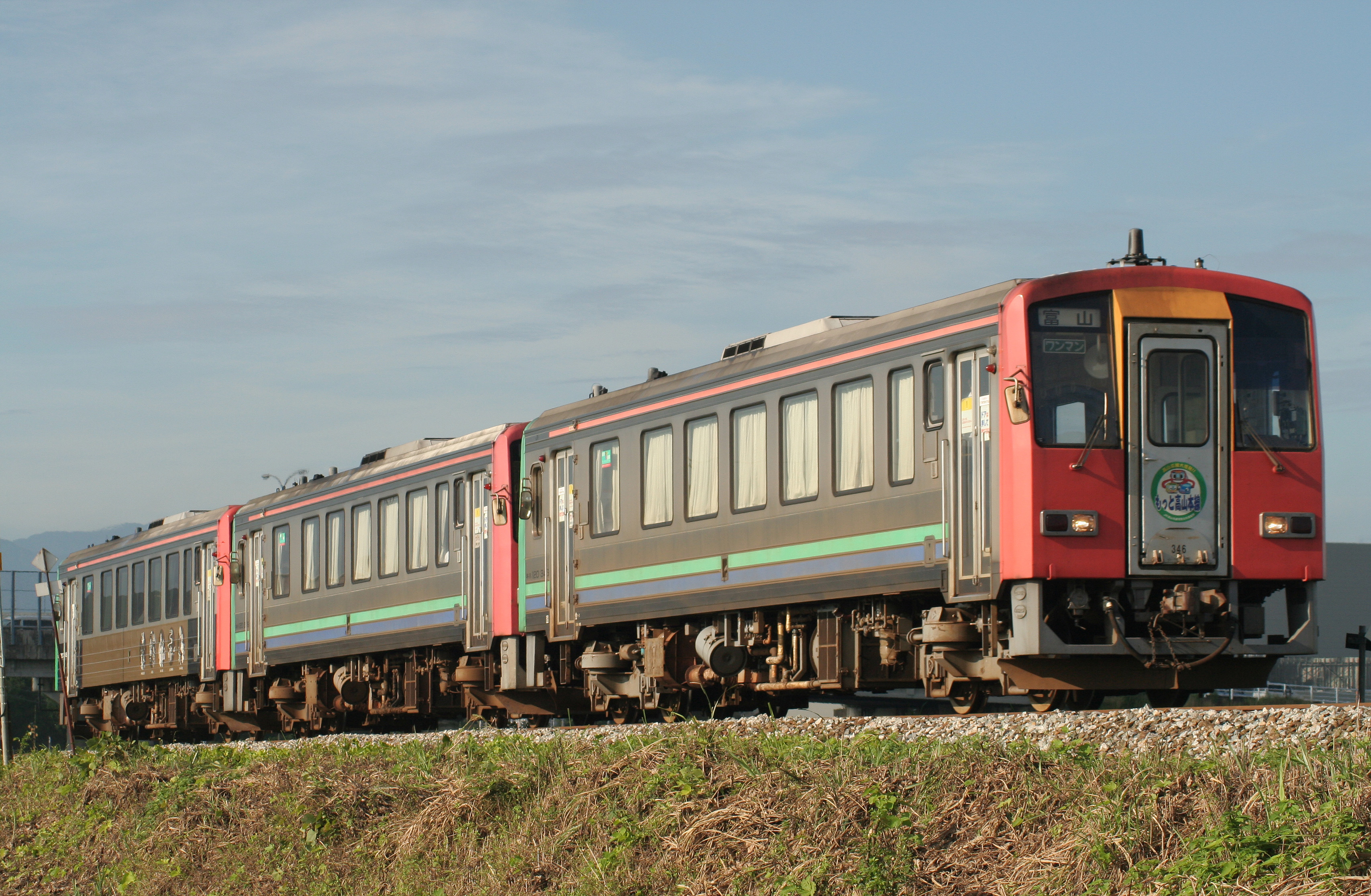
Toyama-based KiHa 120-300s in August 2009
