= Rokujō Station =

Railway station in Fukui, Fukui Prefecture, Japan

Rokujō Station 六条駅
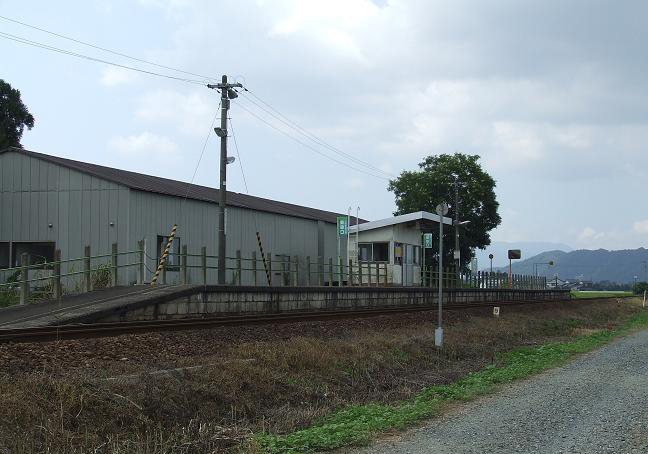
- Rokujō Station in August 2007

General information
- Location: Tennocho, Fukui-shi, Fukui-ken 918-8136; Japan
- Coordinates: 36°01′42″N 136°14′23″E
- Operator: JR West
- Line: ■ Etsumi-Hoku Line (Kuzuryū Line)
- Distance: 2.3 km from Echizen-Hanandō
- Platforms: 1 side platform
- Tracks: 1

Other information
- Status: Unstaffed
- Website: Official website

History
- Opened: December 15, 1960

Passengers
- FY2016: 5 daily
Location
- Location within Japan

Rokujō Station (六条駅, Rokujō-eki) is a JR West railway station in the city of Fukui, Fukui, Japan.

== Lines ==
Rokujō Station is served by the Etsumi-Hoku Line, and is located 2.3 kilometers from the terminus of the line at Echizen-Hanandō and 4.9 kilometers from Fukui.

== Station layout ==
The station consists of one ground-level side platform serving single bi-directional track. There is no station building, but only a shelter on the platform. The station is unattended.

== Adjacent stations ==
«	Service	»
Etsumi Hoku Line
Echizen-Hanandō	Local	Asuwa

== History ==
Rokujō Station opened on December 15, 1960. With the privatization of Japanese National Railways (JNR) on 1 April 1987, the station came under the control of JR West.

== Surrounding area ==
- Fukui Rokujo Elementary School

== See also ==
- List of railway stations in Japan
