= Echizen-Hanandō Station =

Railway station in Fukui, Fukui Prefecture, Japan

Echizen-Hanandō Station 越前花堂駅
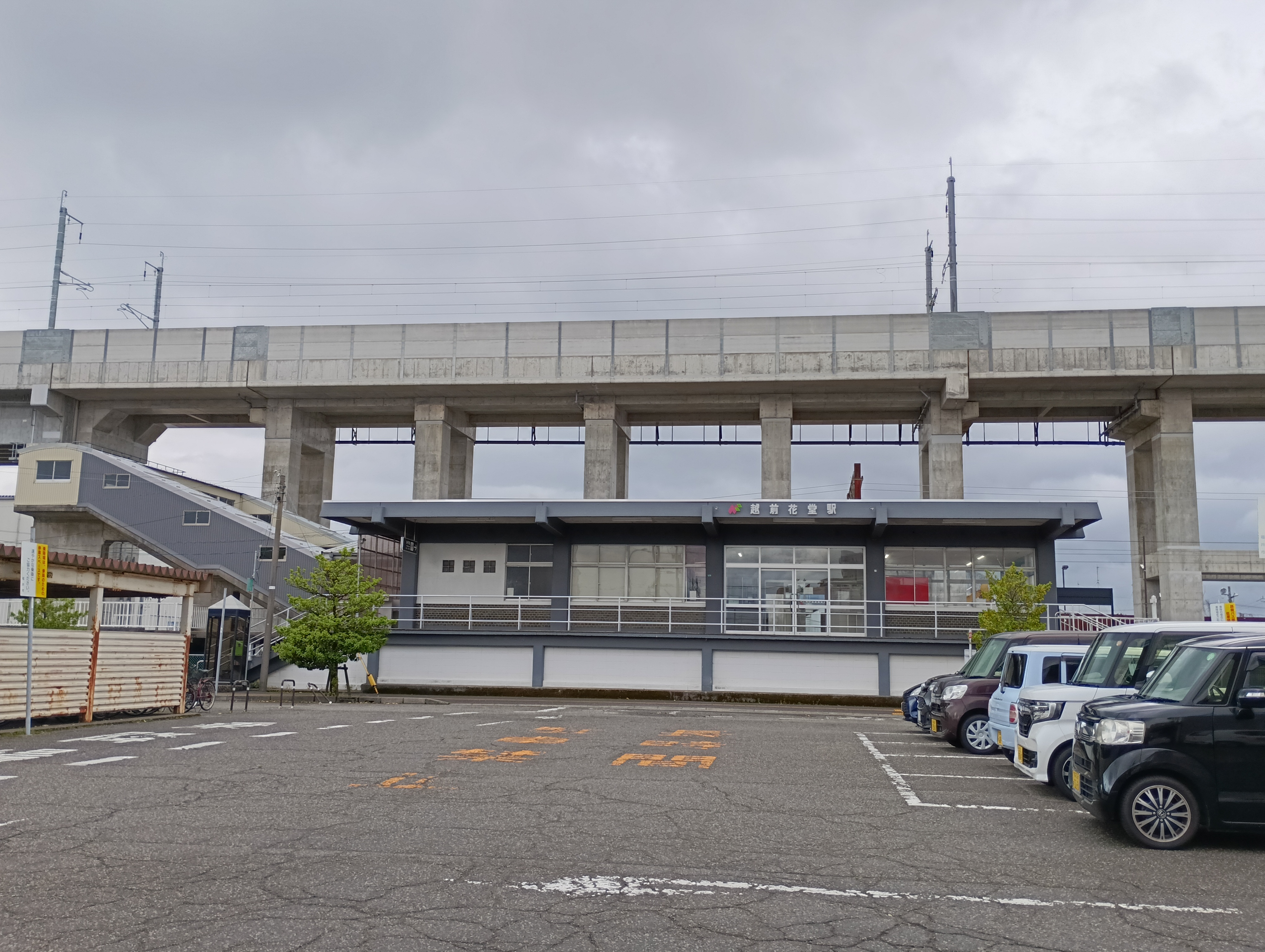
- Echizen-Hanandō Station in May 2026 with the Hokuriku Shinkansen viaduct in the background

General information
- Location: 1-1-12 Hanandō-naka, Fukui-shi, Fukui-ken, 918-8014; Japan
- Coordinates: 36°02′19″N 136°13′05″E
- Operator: JR West, Hapi-Line Fukui
- Lines: ■ Hapi-Line Fukui Line; ■ Etsumi-Hoku Line (Kuzuryū Line)
- Distance: 51.4 km from Tsuruga
- Platforms: 3 side platforms
- Tracks: 3

Construction
- Structure type: At-grade

Other information
- Status: Unstaffed
- Website: Official website (JR); Official website (Hapi-Line Fukui)

History
- Opened: December 15, 1960

Passengers
- FY2016: 391 daily
Location
- Location within Japan

Echizen-Hanandō Station (越前花堂駅, Echizenhanandō-eki) is a railway station on the Hapi-Line Fukui Line and the Etsumi-Hoku Line in the city of Fukui, Fukui Prefecture, Japan, operated by the West Japan Railway Company (JR West) and Hapi-Line Fukui.

== Lines ==
Echizen-Hanandō Station is served by the Hapi-Line Fukui Line, and is located 51.4 kilometers from the terminus of the line at Tsuruga. It is also a terminal station for the Etsumi-Hoku Line and is 52.5 kilometers from the opposing terminal of the line at Kuzuryūko.

== Station layout ==
The station consists of two opposed side platforms for the Hapi-Line Fukui Line and a single side platform for the Etsumi-Hoku Line connected by a footbridge. The station is unattended.

=== Platforms ===
1	■ Hapi-Line Fukui Line	for Fukui and Kanazawa
2	■ Hapi-Line Fukui Line	for Takefu and Tsuruga
2	■ Etsumi-Hoku Line	for Kuzuryūko for Fukui

== Adjacent stations ==
«	Service	»
Hapi-Line Fukui Line
Rapid: Does not stop at this station
Ōdoro	Local	Fukui
Etsumi Hoku Line
Fukui	Local	Rokujō

== History ==
Echizen-Hanandō Station opened on December 15, 1960. With the privatization of Japanese National Railways (JNR) on 1 April 1987, the station came under the control of JR West.

== Passenger statistics ==
In fiscal 2016, the station was used by an average of 391 passengers daily (boarding passengers only).

== Surrounding area ==
- Fukui Prefectural Tsui High School

== See also ==
- List of railway stations in Japan
