= Mount Sannomine =

Mountain in Japan

- 三ノ峰
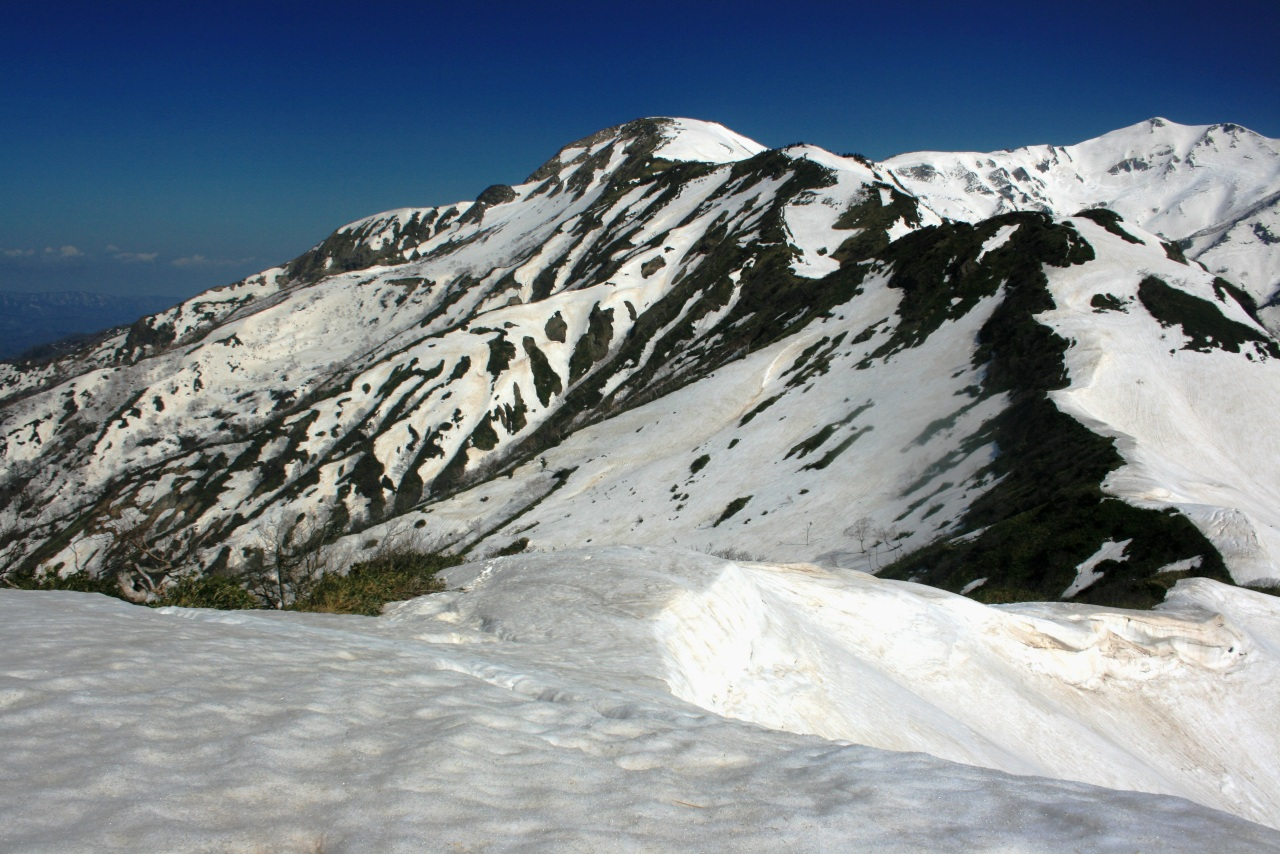
- Mount Sannomine

Highest point
- Elevation: 2,128 m (6,982 ft)
- Coordinates: 36°05′21″N 136°45′15″E

Geography
- Location within Japan
- Location: Takayama, Gifu Prefecture; Hakusan, Ishikawa Prefecture, Japan
- Parent range: Ryōhaku Mountains

Mt. Sannomine (三ノ峰, San-no-mine) is located on the border of Takayama, Gifu Prefecture, and Hakusan, Ishikawa Prefecture, Japan, and rises to a height of 2,128 m (6,982 ft). It is located within the Hakusan National Park.

== History ==
Mount Sannomine, together with Mount Bessan, are sometimes included and called "Mount Haku's Five Peaks" (白山五峰 Hakusan go-mine).

Mount Haku has been climbed for religious purposes for centuries. One popular hiking route from the Gifu Prefecture side of the mountains to Mount Haku's peak runs through Mount Bessan.

== Geography ==
The surrounding area is part of Japan's snow country, so it is covered by snow for more than half of the year and various alpine plants can be seen.

== Hiking paths ==
- There is a walking route from Mount Bessan in the north.
- The shortest route originates in Ōno, Fukui Prefecture.

== See also ==
- Ryōhaku Mountains
- Hakusan National Park
