= Mount Oizuru =

Mountain in Toyama Prefecture, Japan

- 笈ヶ岳
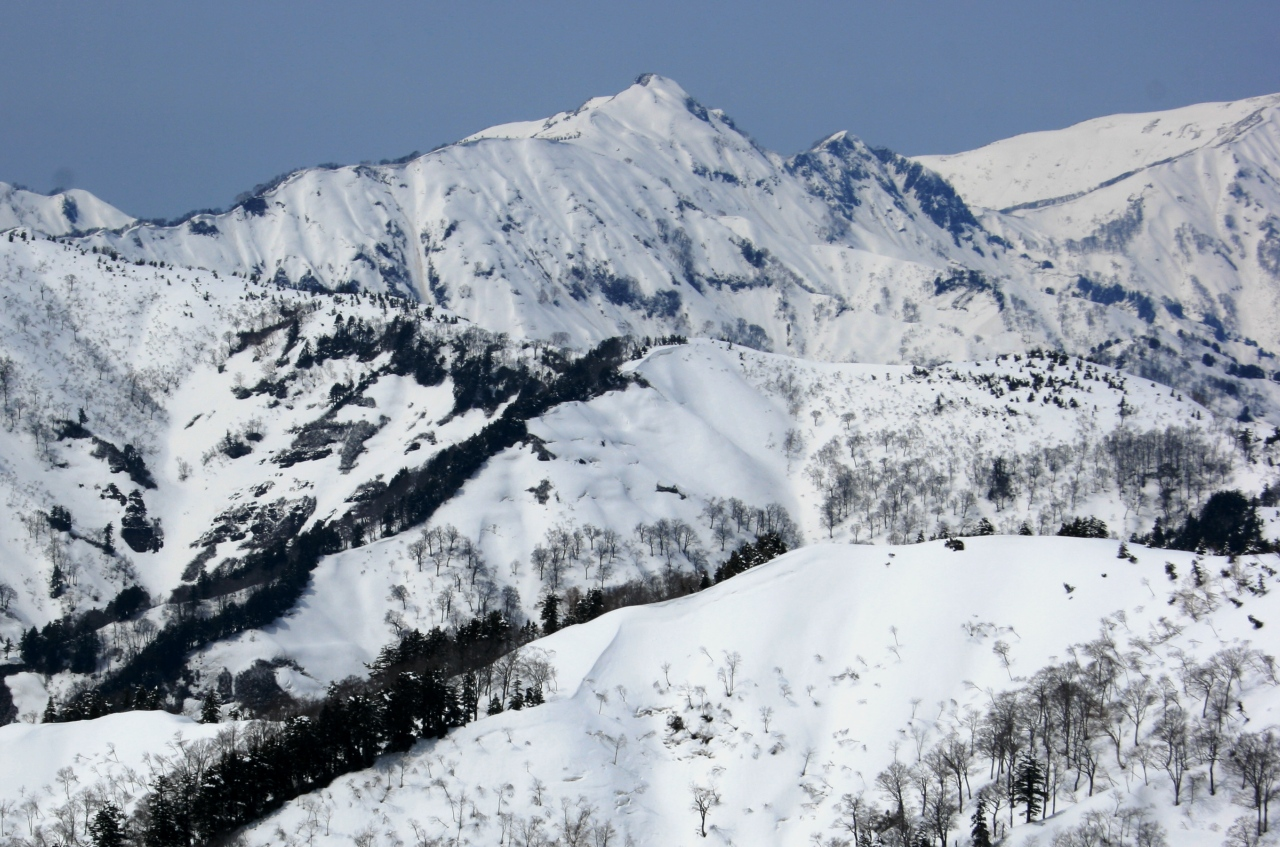
- Mount Oizuru

Highest point
- Elevation: 1,841 m (6,040 ft)
- Coordinates: 36°17′55″N 136°47′32″E

Geography
- Location within Japan
- Location: Gifu Prefecture; Ishikawa Prefecture; Toyama Prefecture; Japan
- Parent range: Ryōhaku Mountains
- Topo map(s): Geographical Survey Institute, 25000:1 白山, 50000:1 白山

Climbing
- First ascent: Prior to 1518

Mount Oizuru (笈ヶ岳, Oizuru-ga-take) is located on the borders of Gifu, Ishikawa and Toyama prefectures in Japan. It is in the northern area of Hakusan National Park and is part of the Ryōhaku Mountains.

== Geography ==
Mount Oizuru, at 1,841 m (6,040 ft), is the tallest mountain in the northern part of the Ryōhaku Mountains. Just north of the mountain is Mount Ōgasa (大笠山 Ōgasa-yama), which is slightly shorter at 1,821 m (5,974 ft). There are three triangulation stations on the mountain's thin peak.

== History ==
Taichō is said to have first scaled the mountain in the early eighth century.

== Gallery ==
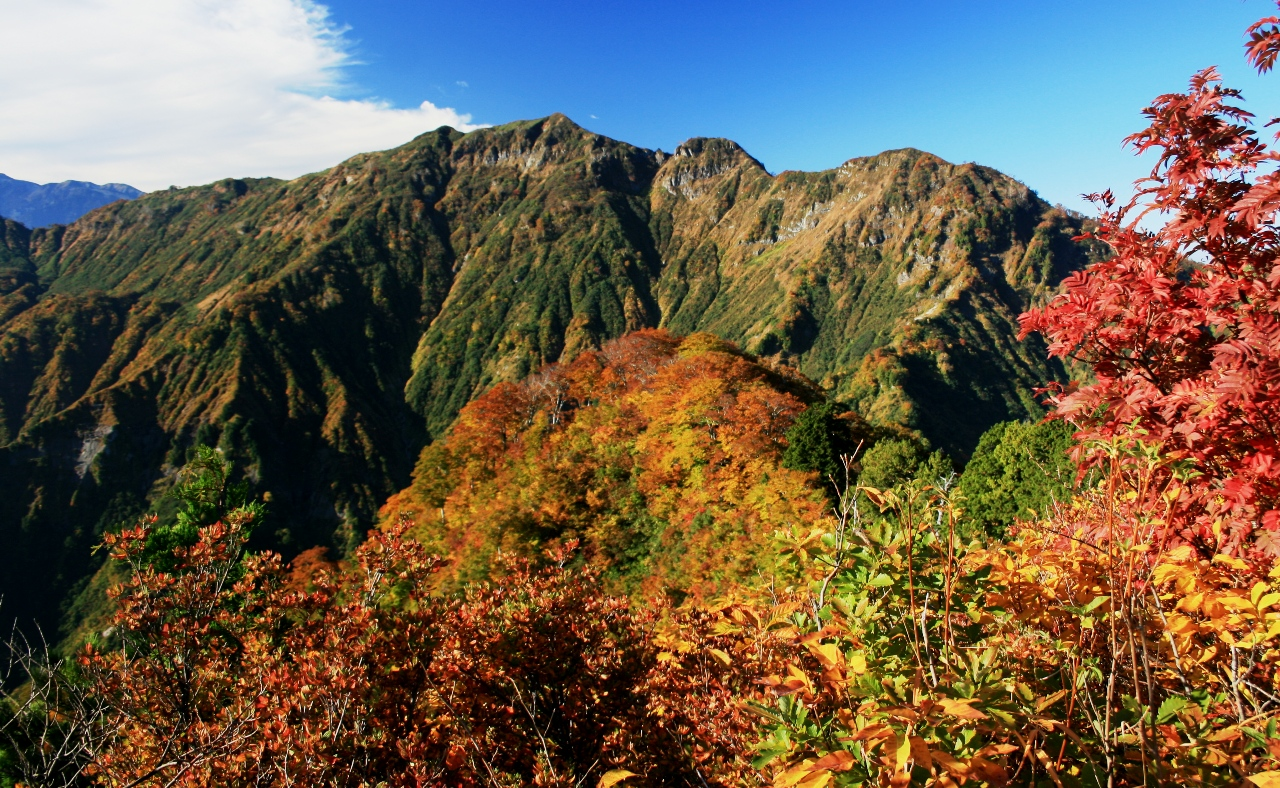
Mount Oizuru seen from Mount Mae-Oizuru

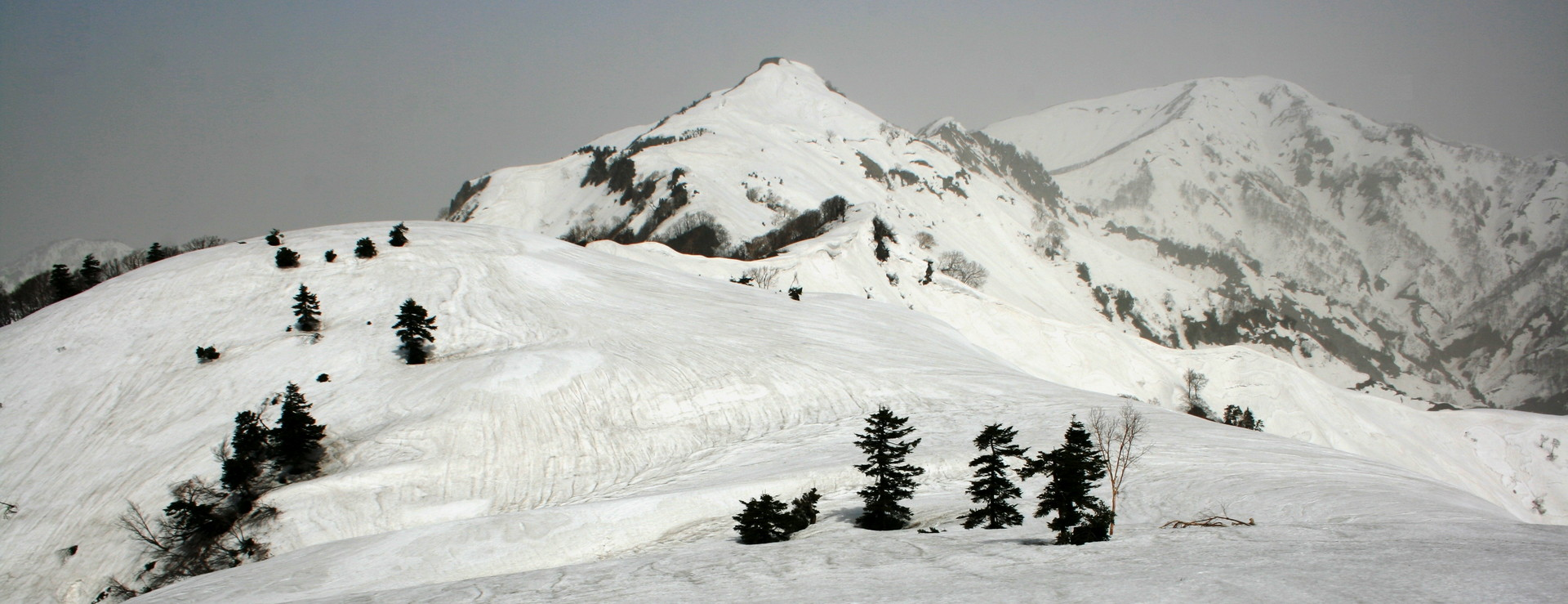
Mount Oizuru seen from Mount Senniniwaya

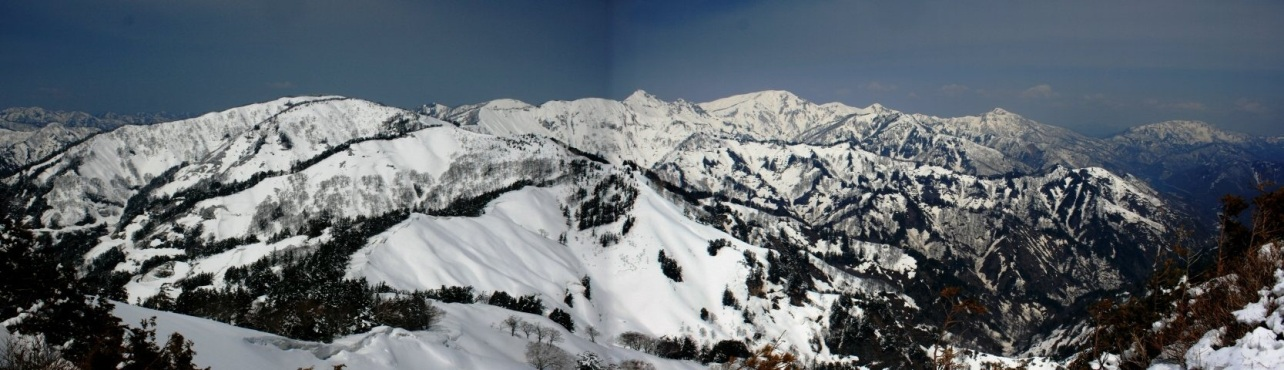
Mount Oizuru and Mount Ōgasa seen from Mount Sanpōiwa

== See also ==
- Hakusan National Park
- Ryōhaku Mountains
- Taichō
