= Mount Nōgōhaku =

Mountain in Japan

- 能郷白山
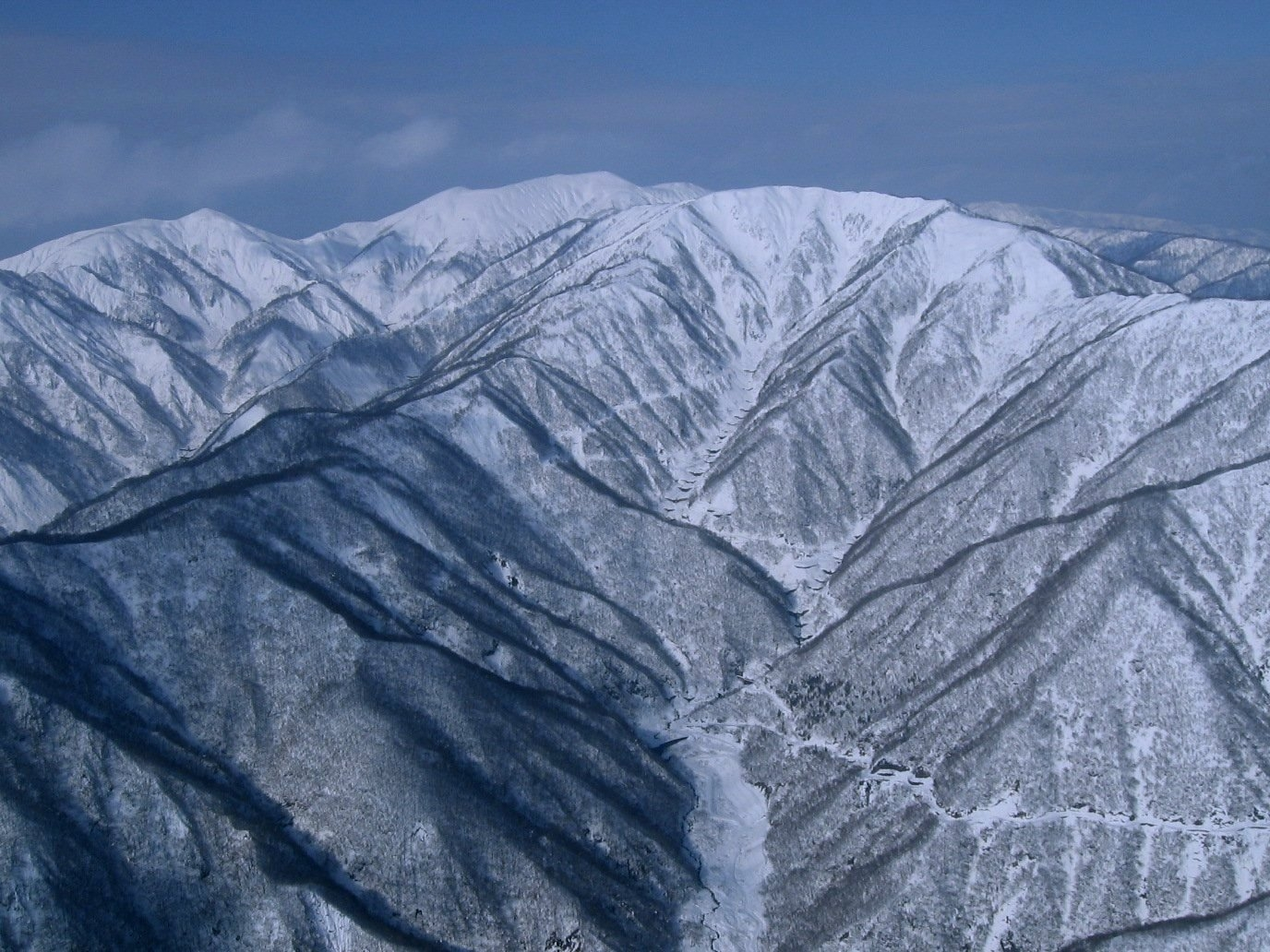
- Mount Nōgōhaku

Highest point
- Elevation: 1,617.33 m (5,306.2 ft)
- Coordinates: 35°45′44″N 136°30′51″E

Naming
- Language of name: Japanese

Geography
- Location within Japan
- Location: Gifu Prefecture; Fukui Prefecture; Japan
- Parent range: Ryōhaku Mountains
- Topo map(s): Geographical Survey Institute, 25000:1 能郷白山, 50000:1 岐阜

Climbing
- First ascent: Taichō in 718

Mount Nōgōhaku (能郷白山, Nōgōhaku-san) is located on the borders of Gifu and Fukui prefectures in Japan. It is part of the Ryōhaku Mountains and serves as the drainage divide between the Pacific Ocean and the Japan Sea. There is one triangulation station at the top of the mountain.

Fragaria iinumae was discovered at first in this Mountain and the name Nōgō Fragaria (ノウゴウイチゴ・能郷苺, Nōgō Ichigo) was given.

== History ==
- 718: Mountain first climbed by Taichō.
- 1897: Shinto shrine of Mount Nōgōhaku Shrine (能郷白山神社, Nōgōhaku-san Jinja) was reconstructed.
- 1965: A large landslide was created by a major flood in the fall.

== Gallery ==
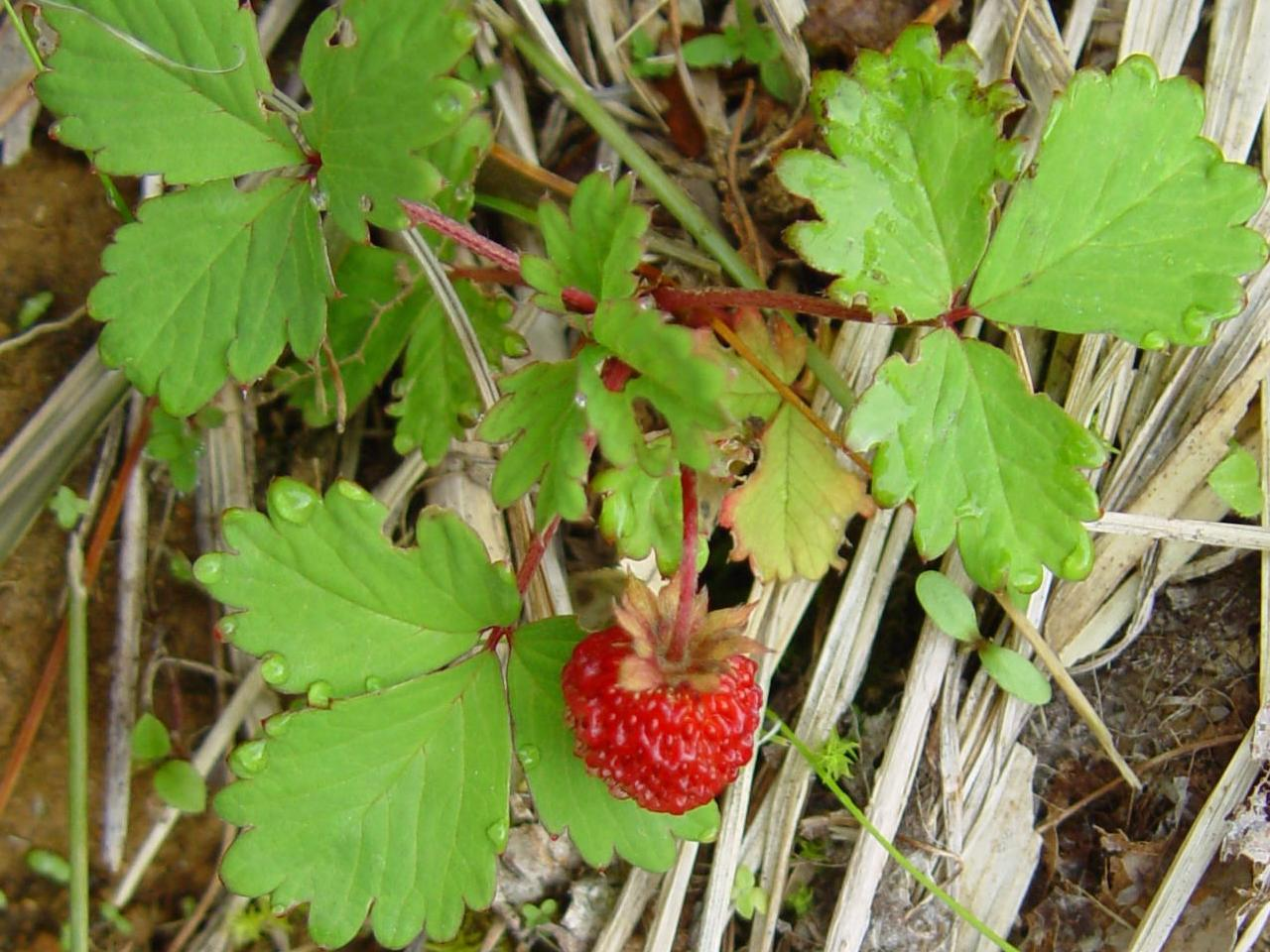
Fruit of Fragaria iinumae, a strawberry species which is native to the area

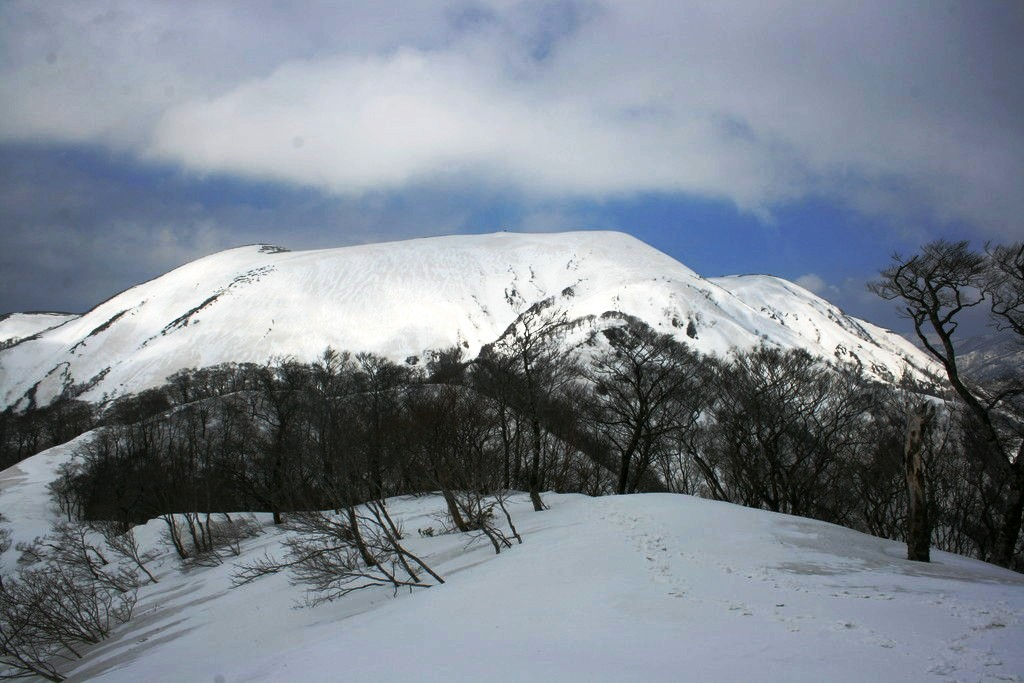
Mount Nōgōhaku from Mount Mae
Mount Haku means white mountain.

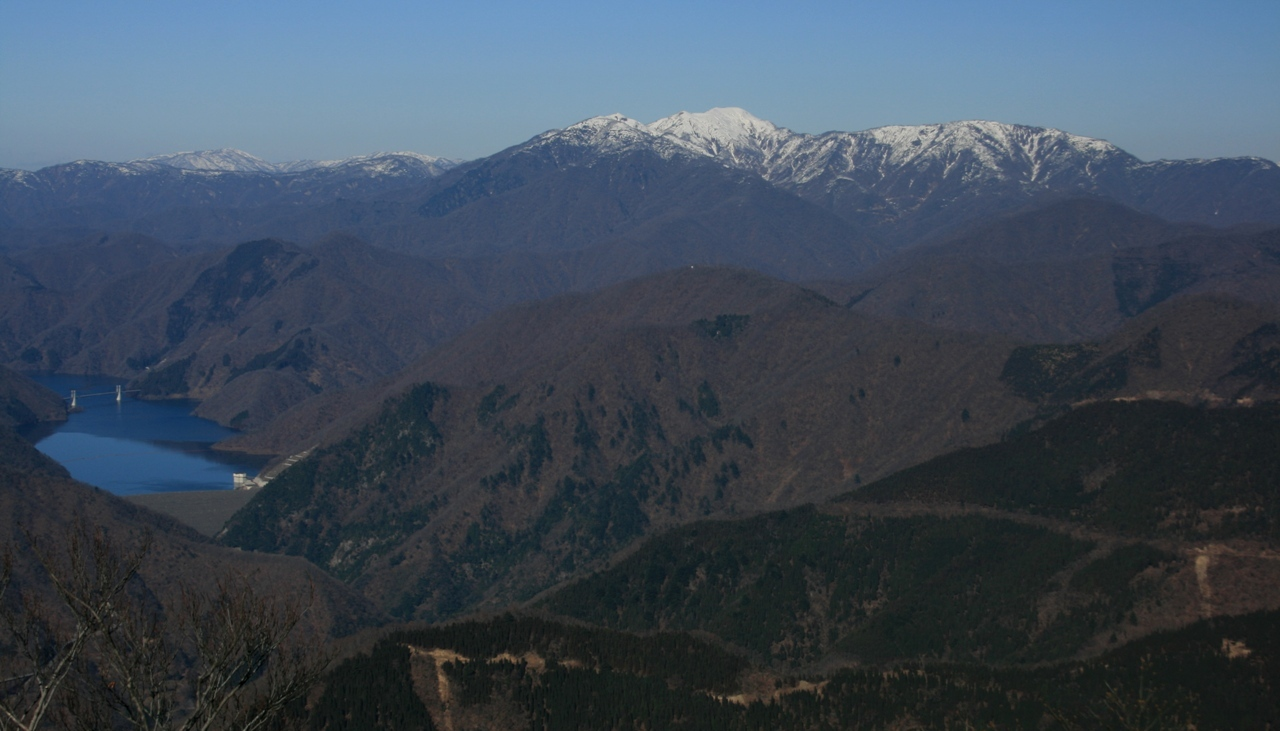
Tokuyama Dam and Mount Nōgōhaku

== See also ==
- Ryōhaku Mountains
- Fragaria iinumae
