= Takasu Snow Park =

Ski area in Gujō, Gifu, Japan

Coordinates: 35°59′53″N 136°52′38″E

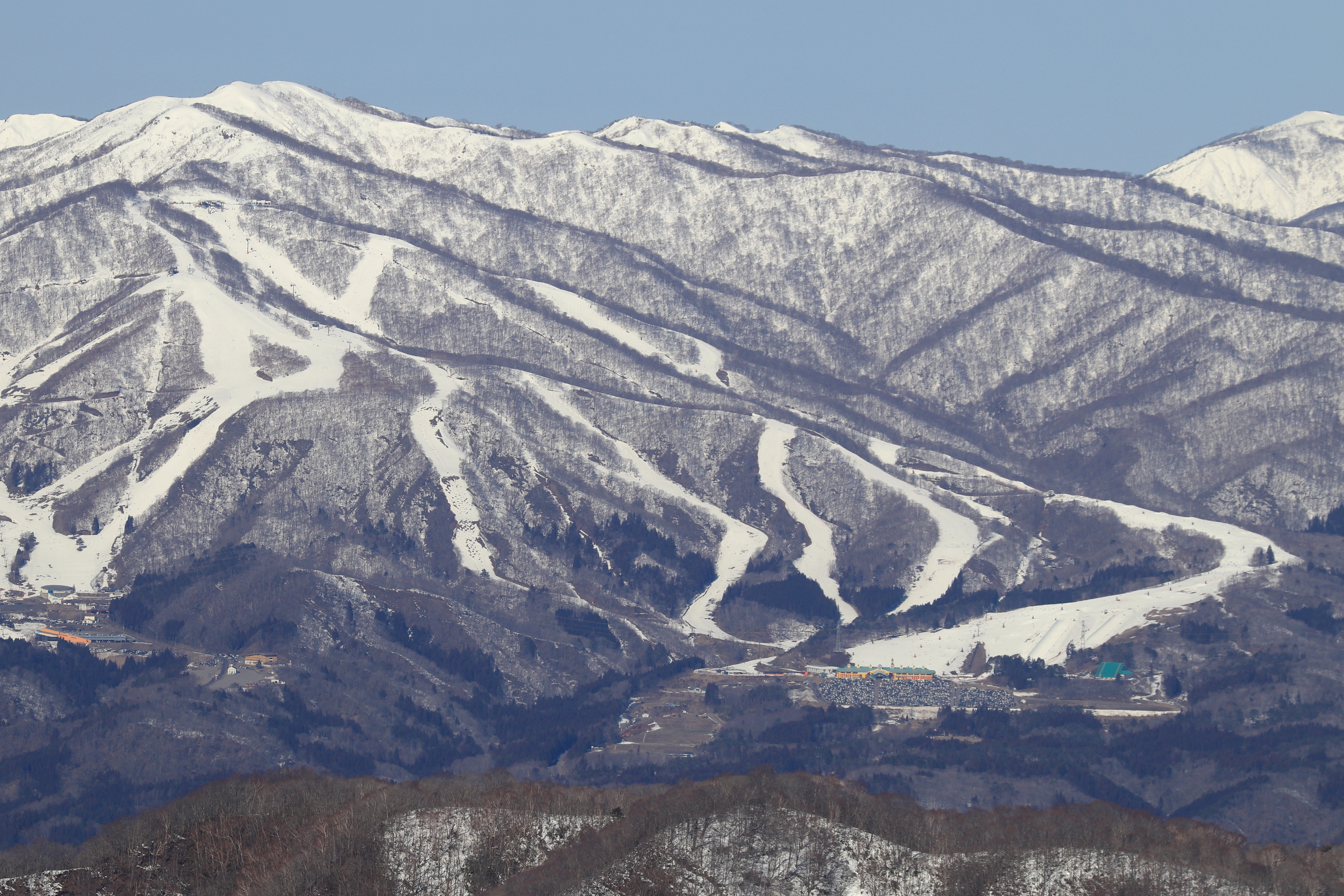
- Dynaland (left) and Takasu Snow Park (right) on Mount Dainichi
- Interactive map of Takasu Snow Park
- Location: Gujō, Gifu, Japan
- Vertical: 600 m (1,969 ft)
- Top elevation: 1,550 m (5,085 ft)
- Base elevation: 950 m (3,117 ft)
- Skiable area: 1.0 km^{2} (247.1 acres)
- Trails: 12
- Longest run: 4.8 kilometres (3.0 mi)
- Lift system: 4 (1 gondola lift and 3 quad chairlifts)
- Website: http://www.takasu.gr.jp/

The Takasu Snow Park (高鷲スノーパーク, Takasu Sunō Pāku) is a ski area on Mount Dainichi in Gifu Prefecture, Japan. The resort opened in 1999, developed by Tōwa Kankō. J Mountains Group acquired the resort in 2006, and is the current operator. The resort is known for its gondola and 3 half-pipes.

== Aerial lifts ==
=== Gondola lift ===
The only gondola lift in the resort is called SP Gondola (SPゴンドラ, Esu Pī Gondora).

- System: Gondola lift, 1 cable
- Cable length: 2.5 kilometres (1.6 mi)
- Vertical interval: 577 m (1,893 ft)
- Operational speed: 6.0 m/s
  - The fastest in Japan.
- Passenger capacity per a cabin: 15
  - The largest in Japan.
- Cabins: 57
- Stations: 2
- Duration of one-way trip: 4 minutes

=== Chairlifts ===
- Champion Quad: 1.7 kilometres (1.1 mi)
- Diamond Quad: 1.7 kilometres (1.1 mi)
- Panorama Quad: 1.3 kilometres (0.8 mi)
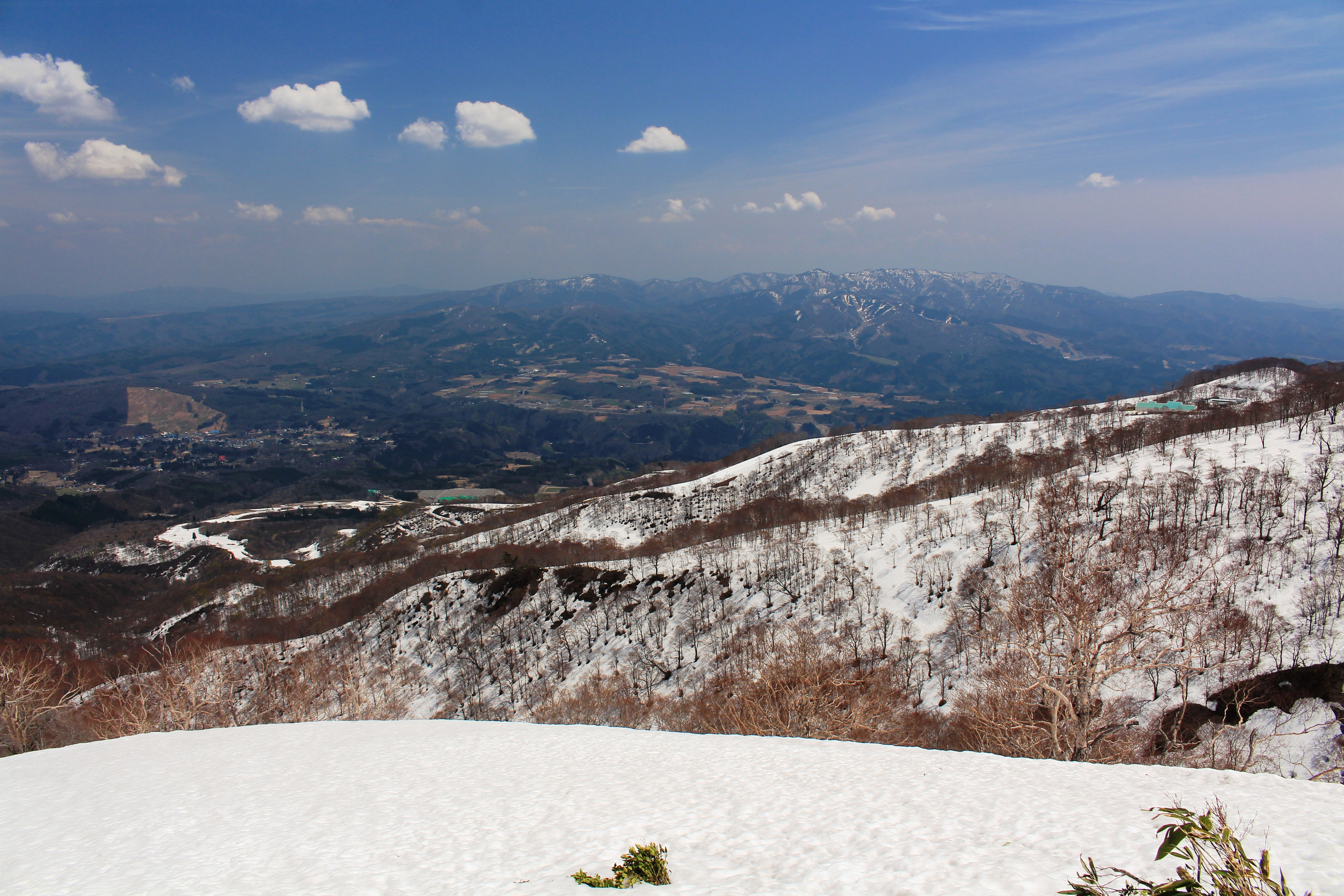
All area

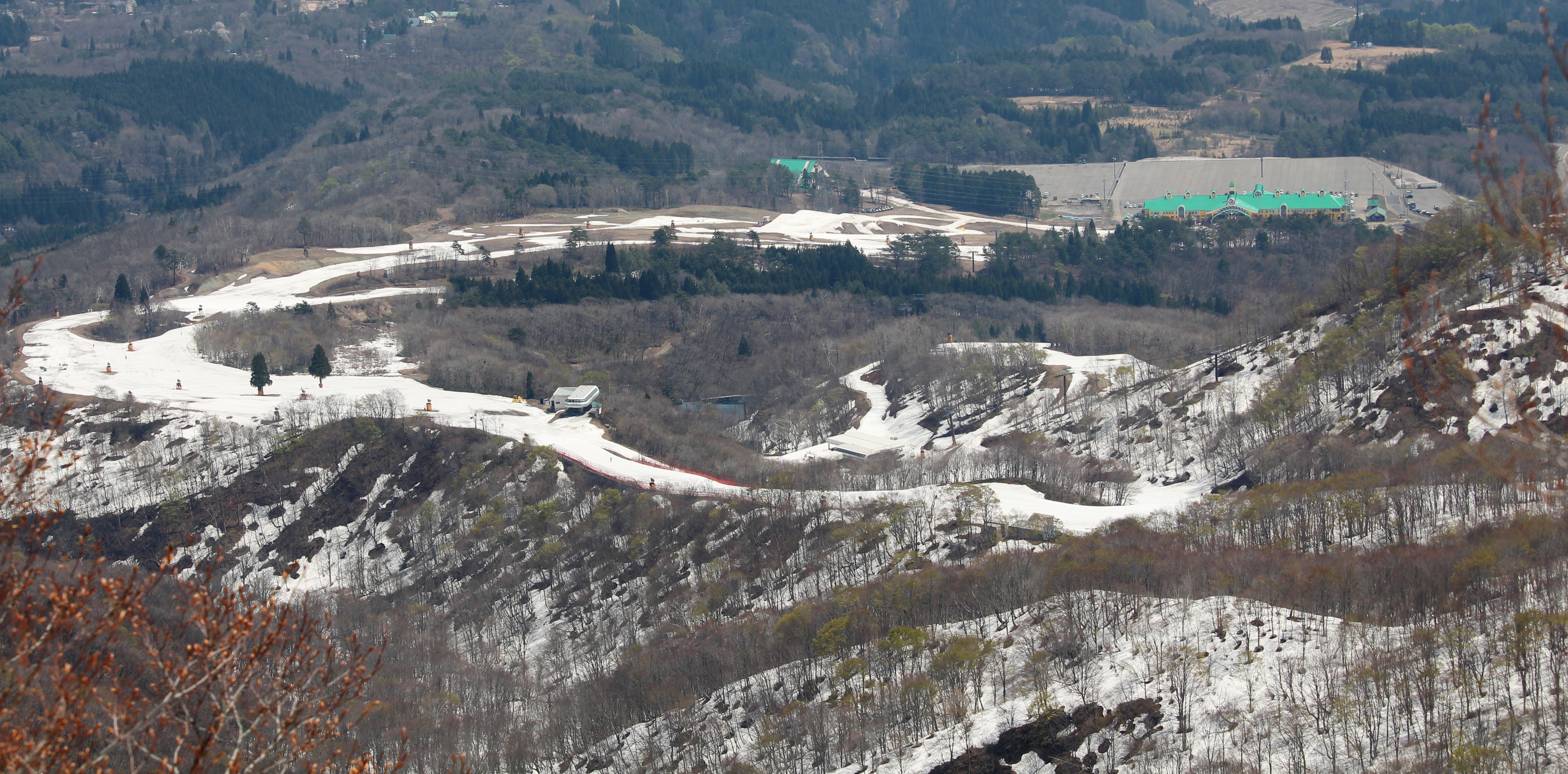
Center house at base

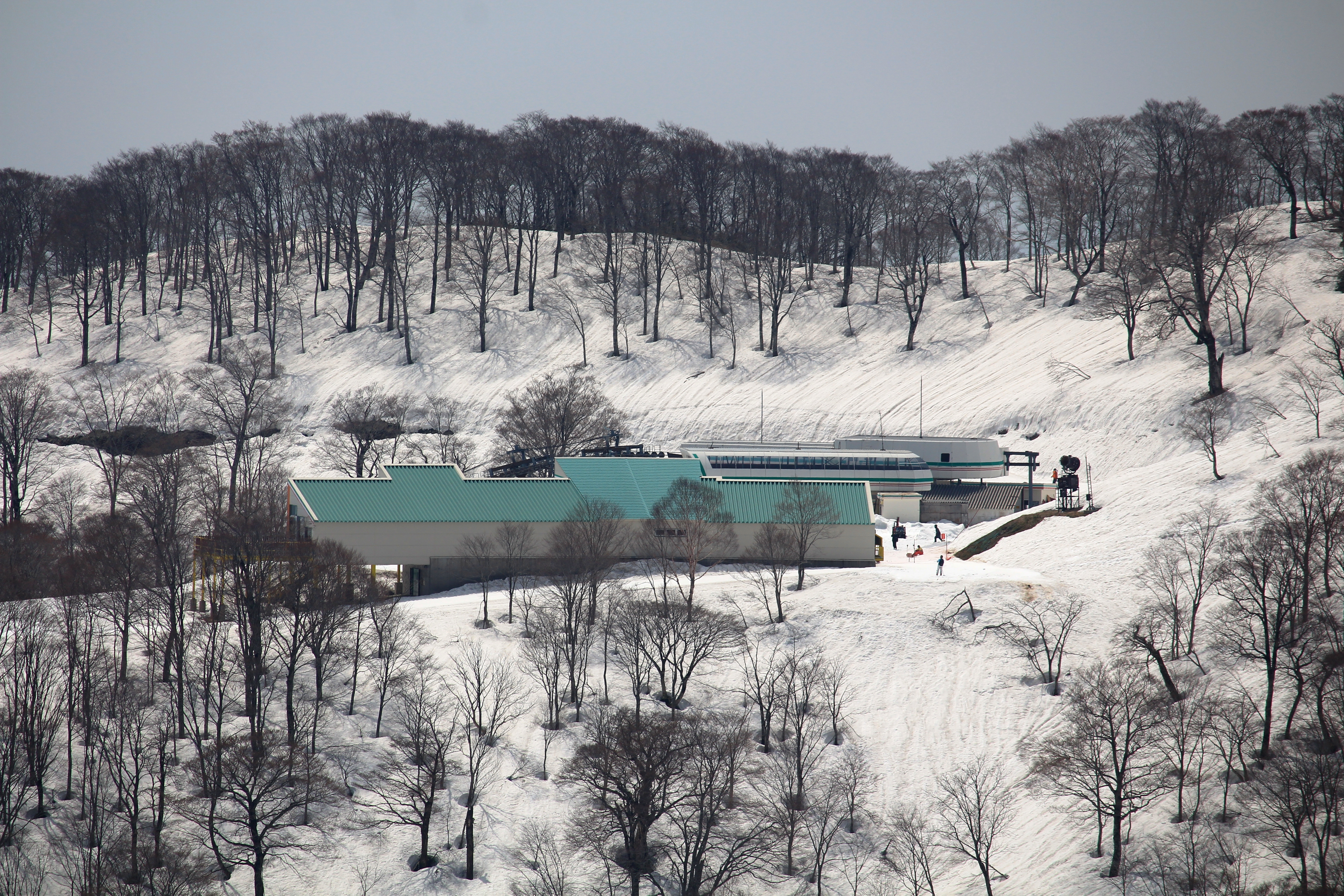
Top of gondola lift

== See also ==
- List of ski areas and resorts in Asia
- List of aerial lifts in Japan
