= Mount Dainichi =

Mountain in Gifu Prefecture, Japan

- 大日ヶ岳
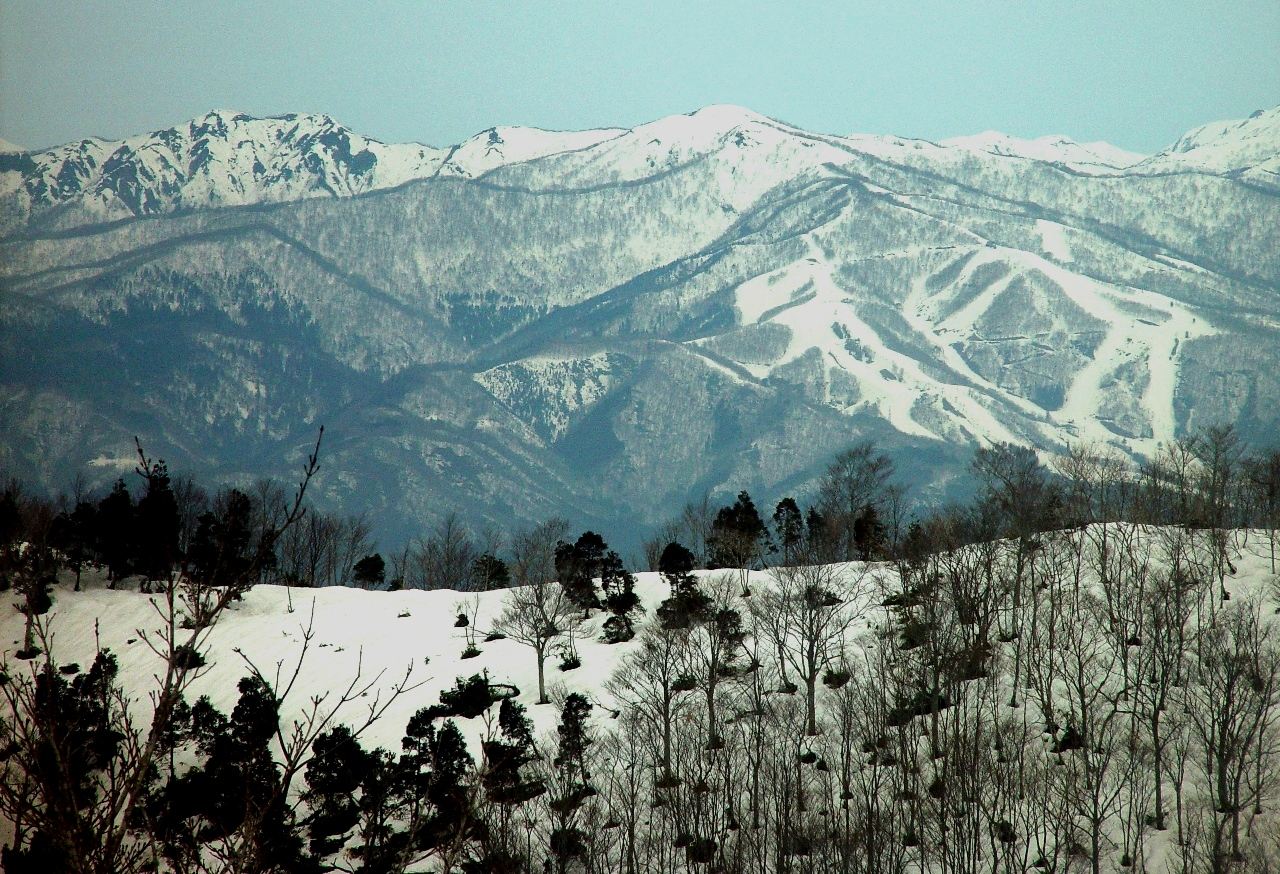
- Mount Dainichi from Mount Shirao

Highest point
- Elevation: 1,709 m (5,607 ft)
- Coordinates: 36°00′05″N 136°50′16″E

Geography
- Location within Japan
- Location: Gujō and Takayama, Gifu Prefecture, Japan
- Parent range: Ryōhaku Mountains

Climbing
- First ascent: Taichō in 717

Mount Dainichi (大日ヶ岳, Dainichi-ga-take) is a mountain located in the cities of Gujō and Takayama in Gifu Prefecture, Japan. It is part of the Ryōhaku Mountains and has a height of 1,709 m (5,607 ft). The rain that falls on the mountain flows into three rivers: the Nagara River, the Shō River and the Kuzuryū River.

== History ==
Taichō (泰澄, 682–April 20, 767) was the first person to climb Mount Dainichi in 717. From the peak of the mountain, hikers can pray to nearby Mount Haku.

In pre-modern Japan, Mount Dainichi formed part of the border between Mino, Hida and Echizen provinces. Originally located in the village of Itoshiro in Fukui Prefecture, it became part of Gifu Prefecture during the "Great Shōwa Mergers" in 1958. It was first part of the town of Shirotori, which was later merged into the city of Gujō.
