= Ryōhaku Mountains =

Mountain range in central Japan

Coordinates: 36°09′18″N 136°46′17″E

The Ryōhaku Mountains (両白山地, Ryōhaku Sanchi) are a mountain range spanning Gifu, Toyama, Ishikawa, Fukui and Shiga prefectures in Japan. It is divided into the Kaetsu Mountains (加越山地 Kaetsu Sanchi), whose major peak is Mount Haku, and the Etsumi Mountains (越美山地 Etsumi Sanchi), whose major peak is Mount Nōgōhaku. The range derives its name from the two major peaks, which both have "haku" in their names. Most of the Ryōhaku Mountains are within Hakusan National Park.

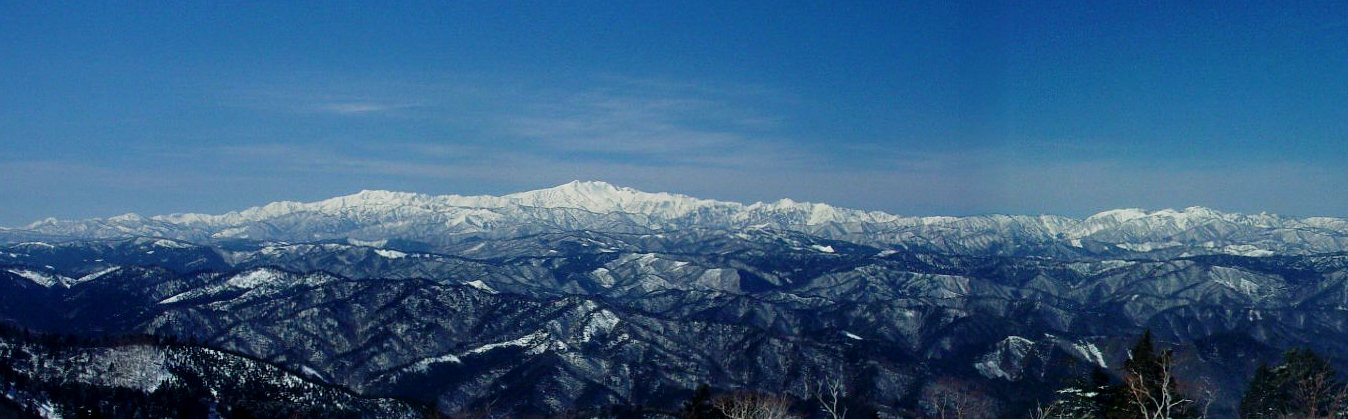
Ryōhaku Mountains

== Major peaks ==
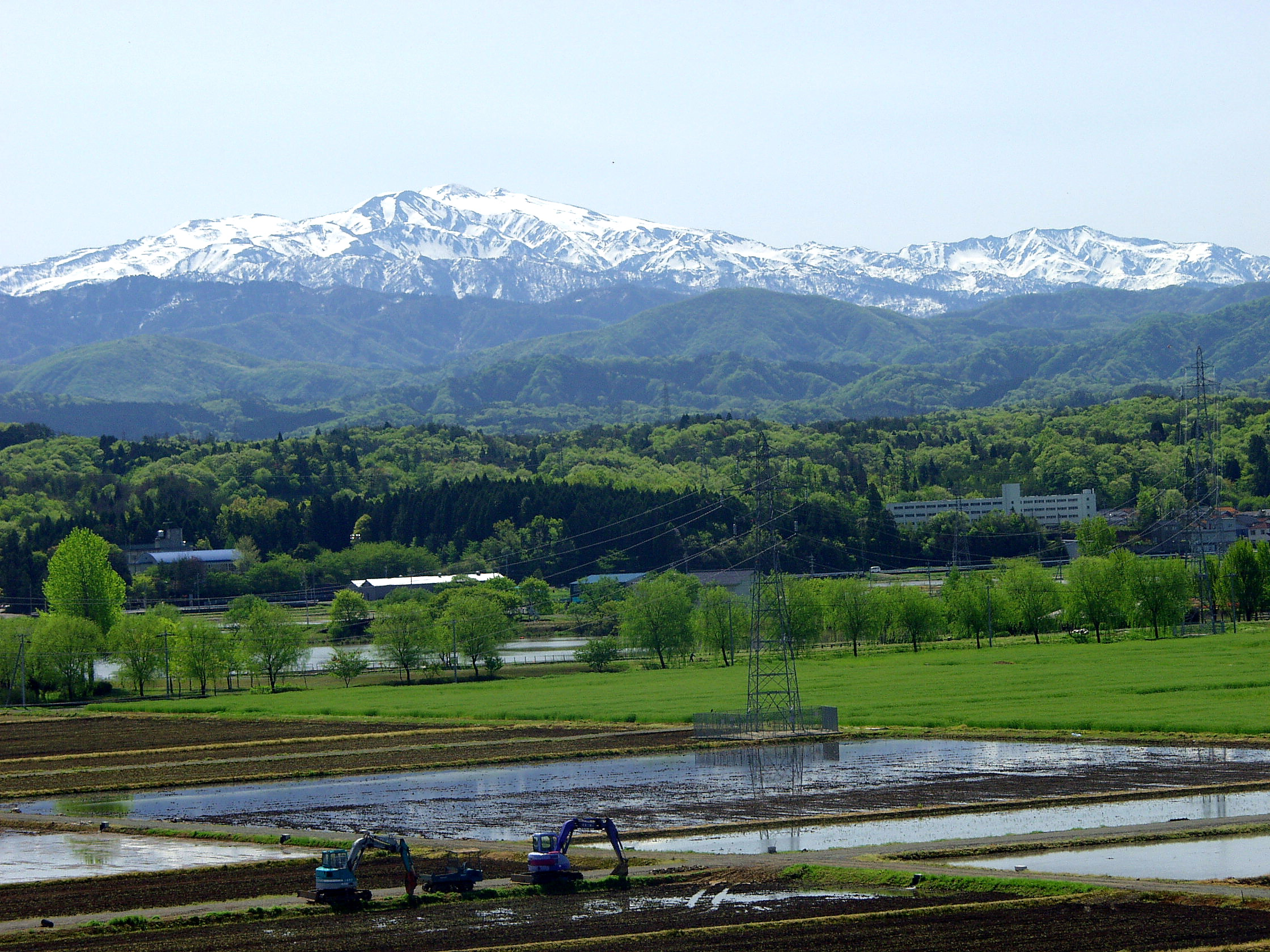
Mount Haku

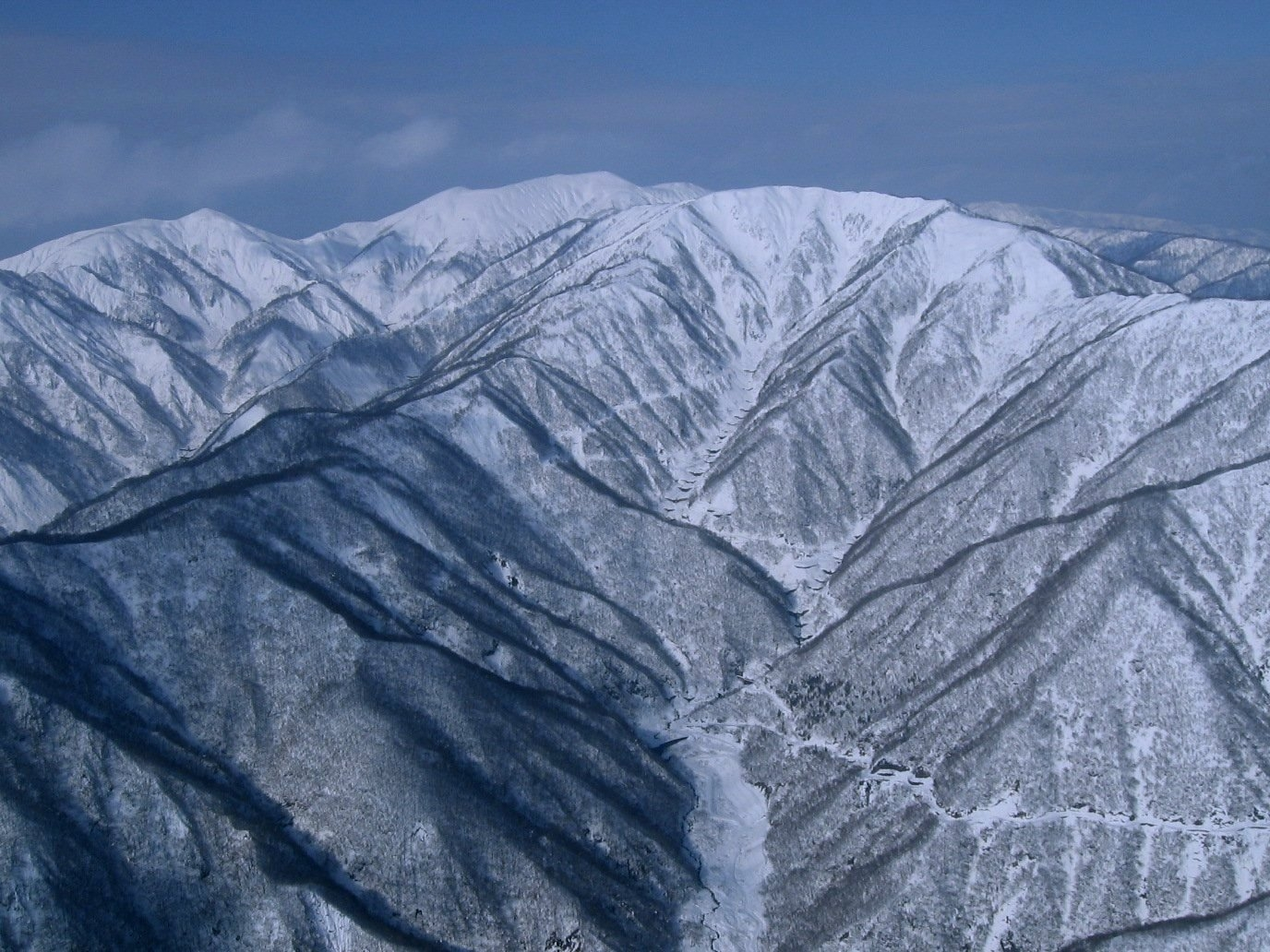
Mount Nōgōhaku

=== Kaetsu Mountains ===
- Mount Ōgasa (大笠山), 1,822 m (5,978 ft)
- Mount Oizuru (笈ヶ岳), 1,841 m (6,040 ft)
- Mount Sanpōiwa (三方岩岳), 1,736 m (5,696 ft)
- Mount Nodanishōji (野谷荘司山), 1,797 m (5,896 ft)
- Mount Haku (白山), 2,702 m (8,865 ft)
- Mount Bessan (別山), 2,399 m (7,871 ft)
- Mount Sannomine (三ノ峰), 2,128 m (6,982 ft)
- Mount Dainichi (大日ヶ岳), 1,709 m (5,607 ft)

=== Etsumi Mountains ===
- Mount Heike (平家岳), 1,442 m (4,731 ft)
- Mount Nōgōhaku (能郷白山), 1,617 m (5,305 ft)
- Mount Byōbu (屏風山), 1,354 m (4,442 ft)
- Mount Kanmuri (冠山), 1,257 m (4,124 ft)
- Mount Sanshū (三周ヶ岳), 1,202 m (3,944 ft)
- Mount Mikuni (三国山), 1,209 m (3,967 ft)

== See also ==
- Geography of Japan
- Hakusan National Park
