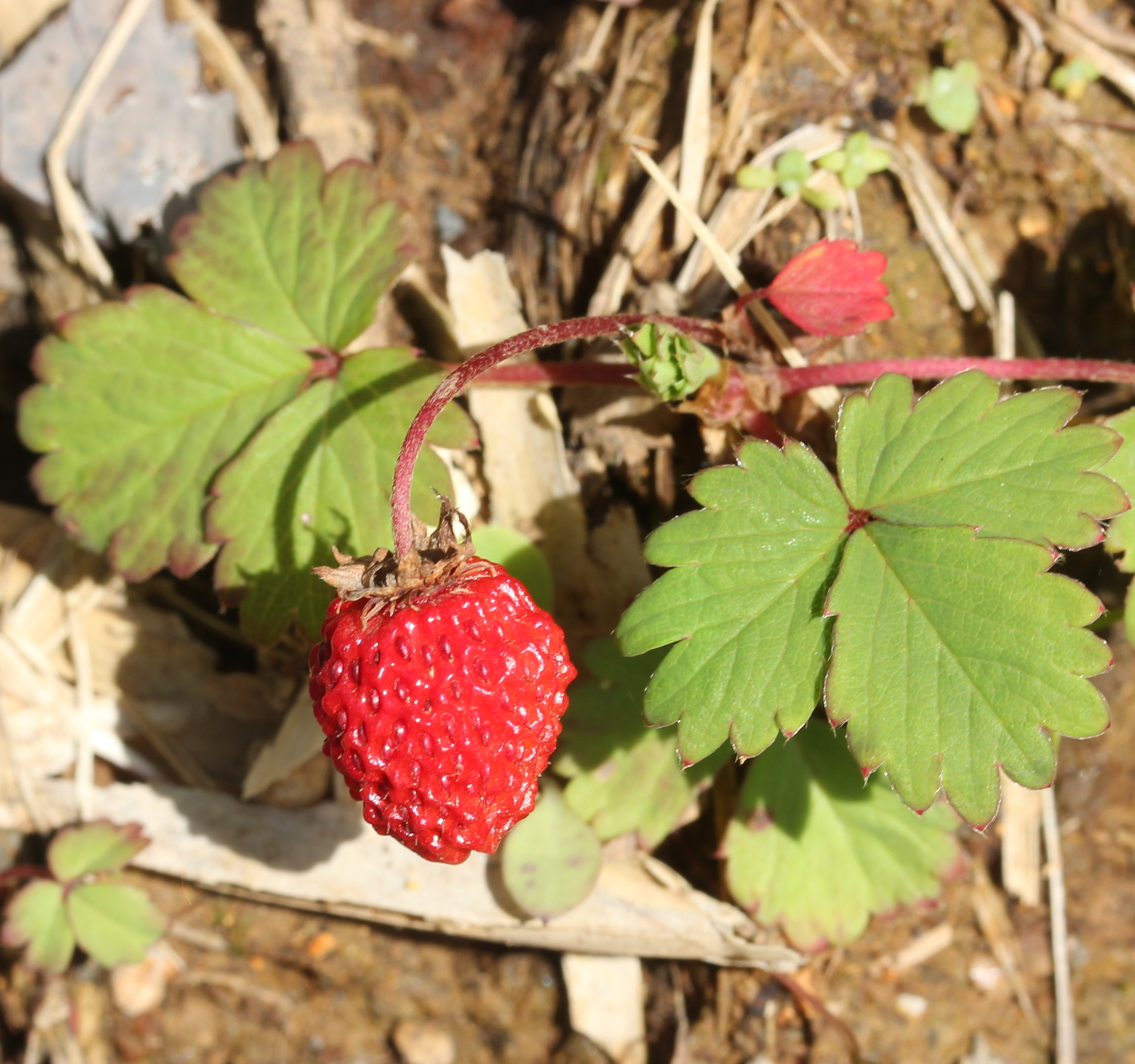

Scientific classification
- Kingdom: Plantae
- Clade: Tracheophytes
- Clade: Angiosperms
- Clade: Eudicots
- Clade: Rosids
- Order: Rosales
- Family: Rosaceae
- Genus: Fragaria
- Species: F. iinumae

Binomial name
- Fragaria iinumae Makino

Synonyms
- Homotypic Synonyms: Potentilla iinumae (Makino) Mabb.; Heterotypic Synonyms: Potentilla daisenensis Honda

= Fragaria iinumae =

Species of strawberry

Fragaria iinumae is a species of strawberry in the family Rosaceae. It is native to Japan and eastern Russia.

In Japan it was first discovered on Mount Nōgōhaku (能郷白山, Nōgōhaku-san) and the name Nōgō Fragaria (ノウゴウイチゴ・能郷苺, Nōgō Ichigo) was given.

All strawberries have a base haploid count of 7 chromosomes. Fragaria iinumae is diploid, having 2 pairs of these chromosomes for a total of 14 chromosomes. Fragaria iinumae is one of the diploid progenitors of the octoploid strawberry.

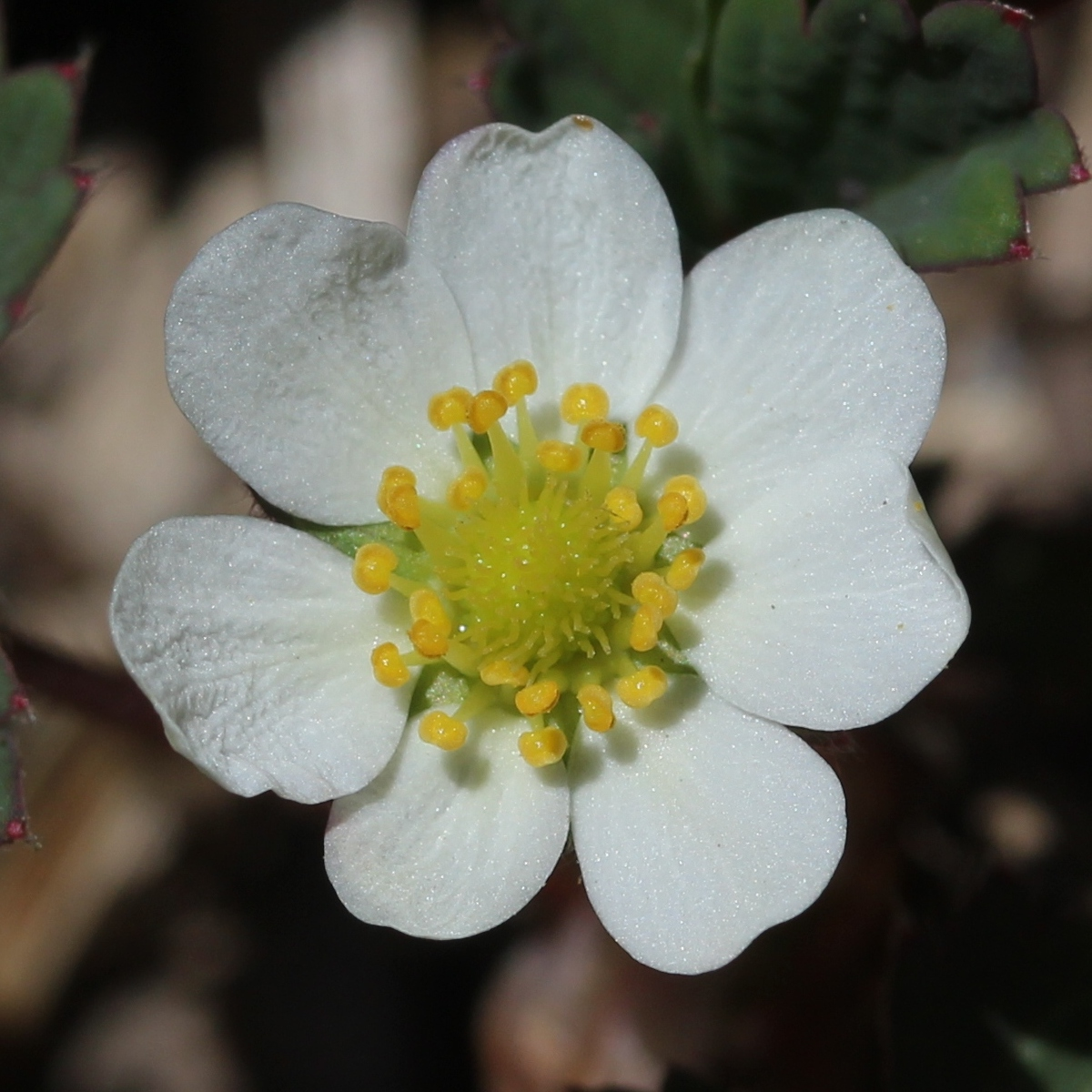
Flower

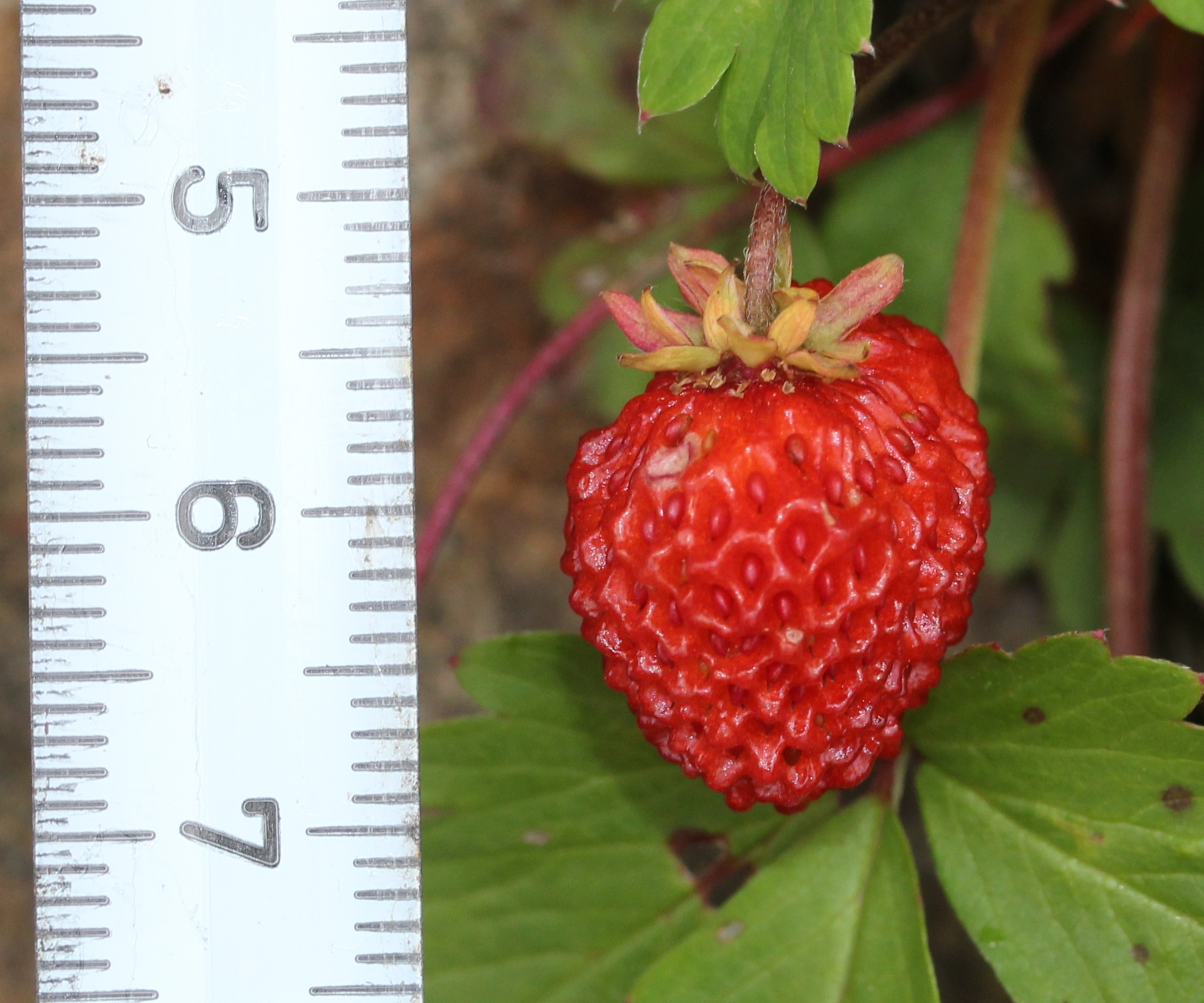
Fruits

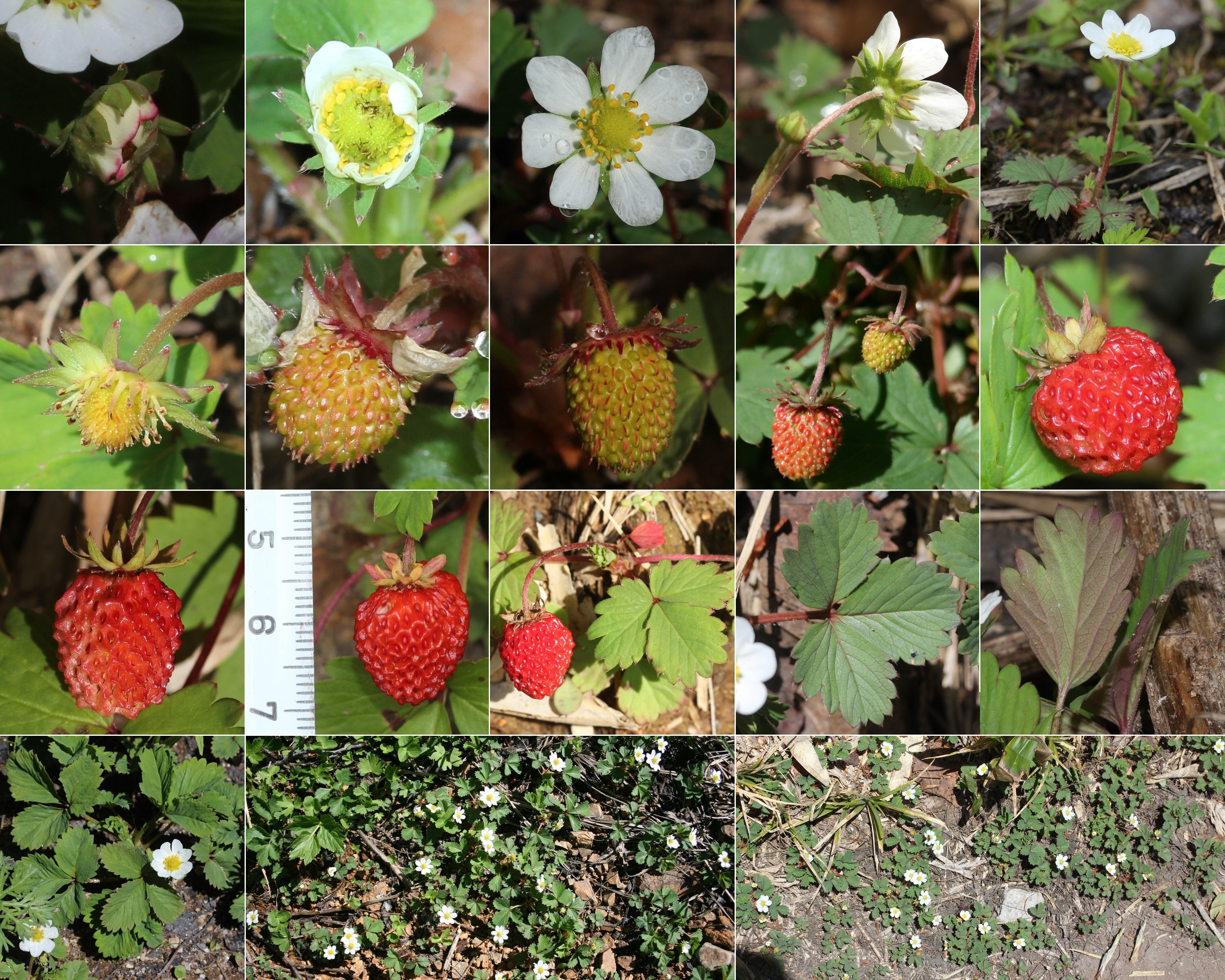
Montage

Genomic information
- NCBI ID: 64939
- Ploidy: diploid
- Number of chromosomes: 14
- Year of completion: 2014

== See also ==
- Alpine plant
