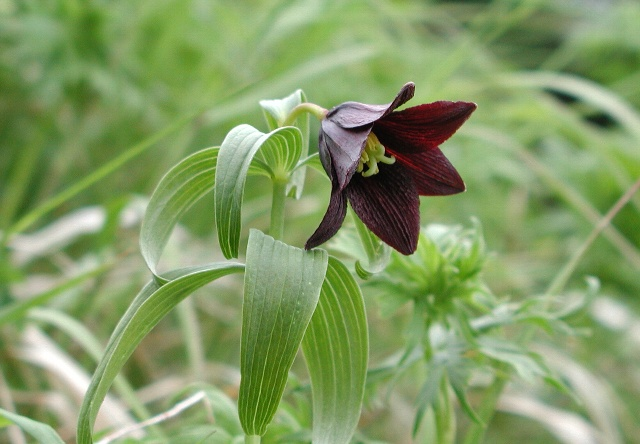

Scientific classification
- Kingdom: Plantae
- Clade: Tracheophytes
- Clade: Angiosperms
- Clade: Monocots
- Order: Liliales
- Family: Liliaceae
- Subfamily: Lilioideae
- Genus: Fritillaria
- Species: F. camschatcensis

Binomial name
- Fritillaria camschatcensis (L.) Ker-Gawl.

Synonyms
- Amblirion camschatcense (L.) Sweet; Lilium camschatcense L.; Fritillaria camschatcensis var. alpina (H.Matsuura & Toyok.) Hid.Hara; Fritillaria camschatcensis subsp. alpina H.Matsuura & Toyok.; Fritillaria camschatcensis var. flavescens Makino; Fritillaria camschatcensis f. flavescens (Makino) T.Shimizu; Fritillaria camschatcensis var. keisukei Makino; Fritillaria saranna Stejneger; Lilium nigrum Siebold; Lilium quadrifoliatum E.Mey. ex C.Presl; Sarana edulis Fisch. ex Baker

= Fritillaria camschatcensis =

Species of flowering plant

Fritillaria camschatcensis is a species of flowering plant native to northeastern Asia and northwestern North America, including northern Oregon, Washington, British Columbia, Alaska, northern Japan, and the Russian Far East (Amur, Kamchatka, Khabarovsk, Magadan, Primorye, Sakhalin and the Kuril Islands). It has many common names, including Kamchatka fritillary and Kamchatka lily.

It is also called rice lily, northern rice-root, or (misleadingly) Indian rice or wild rice, because of the rice-like bulblets that form around its roots.

== Description ==
Fritillaria camschatcensis produces bulbs with several large fleshy scales, similar to those of commercially cultivated garlic. Leaves are lanceolate, up to 10 cm long, borne in whorls along the stem. Stem is up to 60 cm tall, with flowers at the top. Flowers are spreading or nodding (hanging downwards), dark greenish brown to brownish purple (chocolate colored), sometimes mottled with yellow. The flowers have a characteristic foul smell, and are pollinated by flies drawn to the offensive odor.

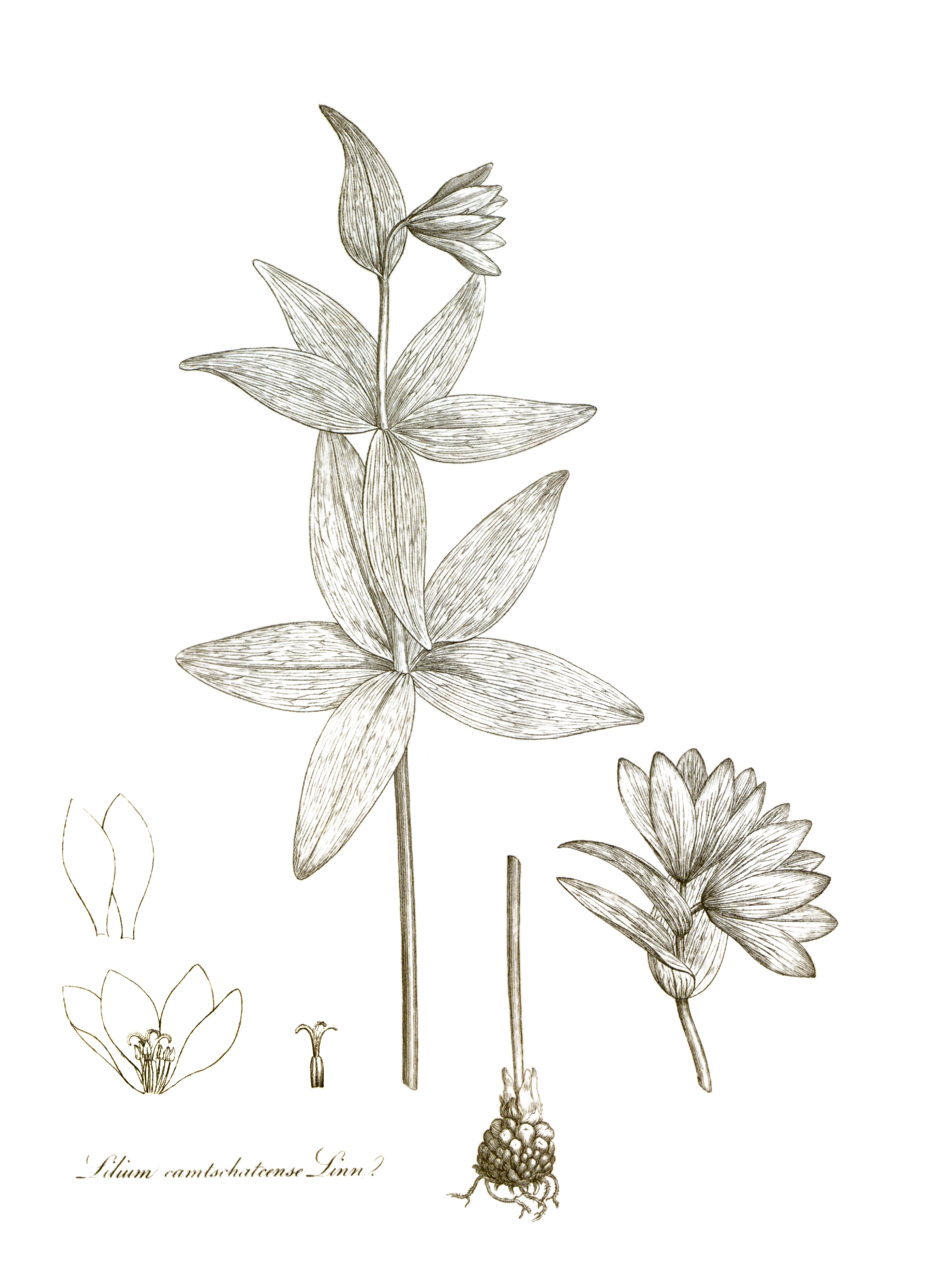
an illustration showing the flower

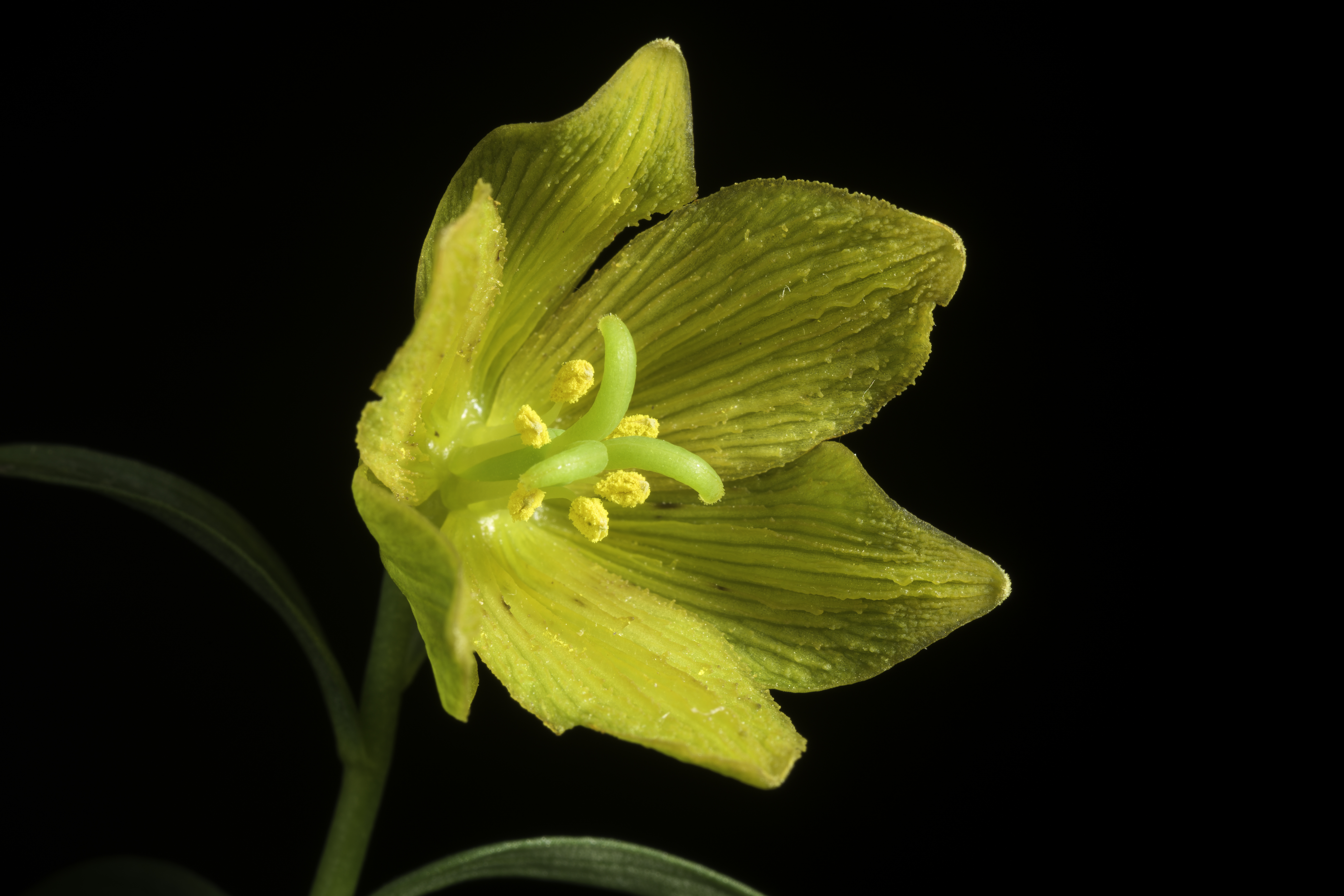
Yellow-flower form

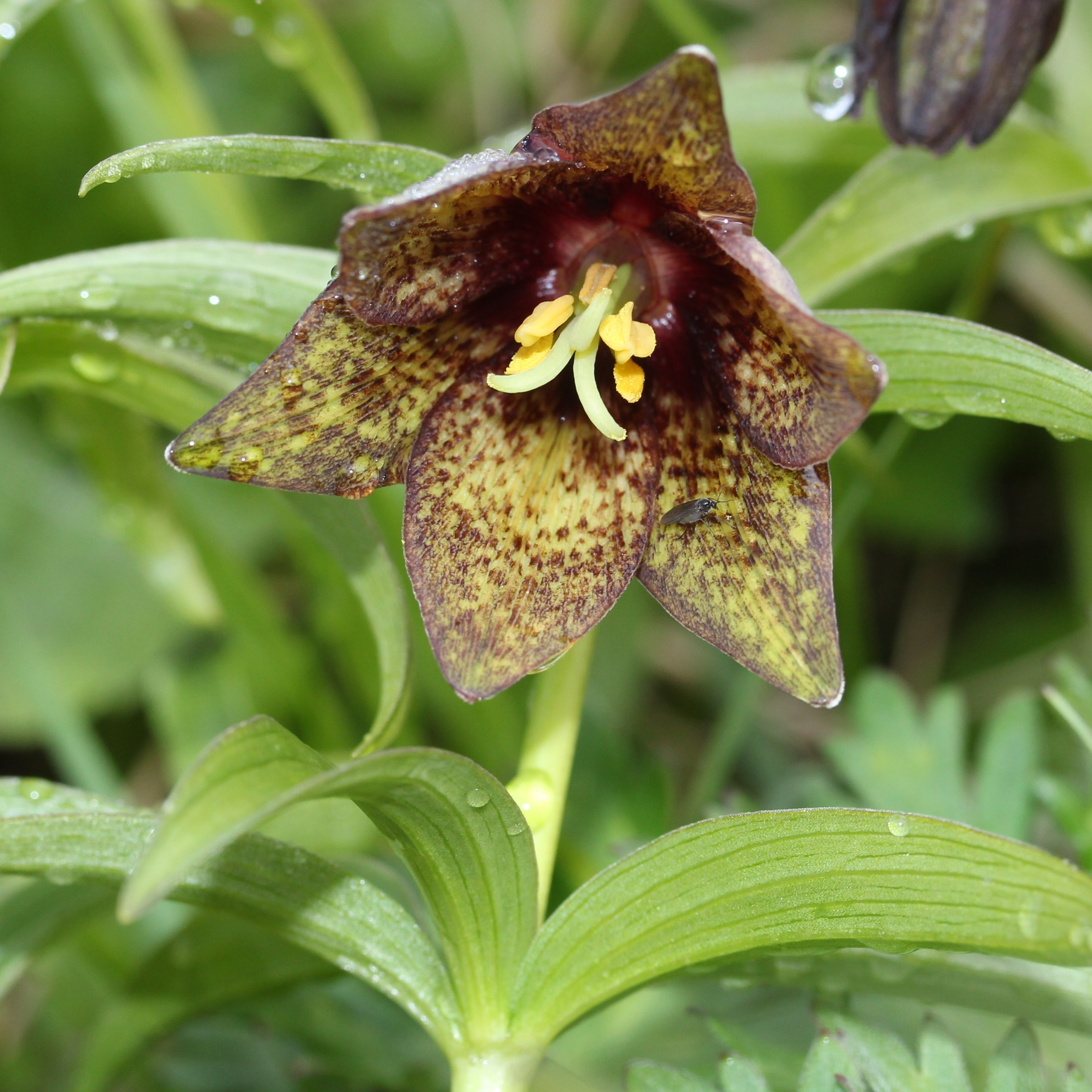
Flowers in Mount Haku, Japan

== See also ==
- List of plants known as lily
