= Mount Bessan =

Mountain in Ishikawa Prefecture, Japan

- 別山
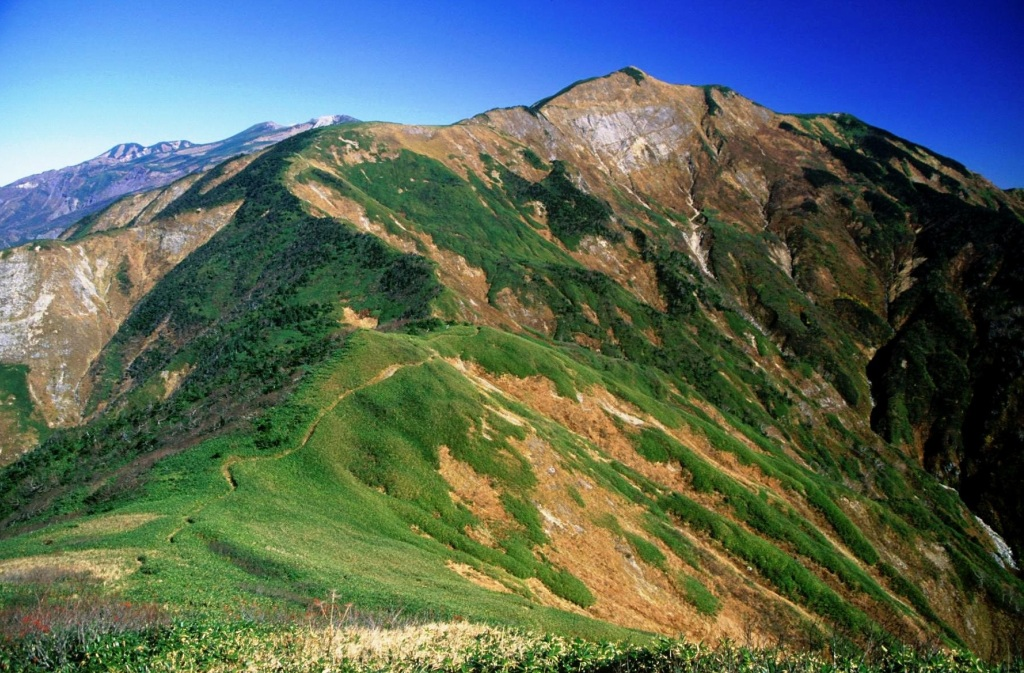
- View of Mount Bessan from Sannomine

Highest point
- Elevation: 2,399 m (7,871 ft)
- Coordinates: 36°06′20″N 136°45′56″E

Geography
- Location within Japan
- Location: Takayama, Gifu Prefecture; Hakusan, Ishikawa Prefecture, Japan
- Parent range: Ryōhaku Mountains

Geology
- Mountain type: Sedimentary

Mt. Bessan (別山, Bessan) is located on the border of Takayama, Gifu Prefecture, and Hakusan, Ishikawa Prefecture, Japan, and rises to a height of 2,399 m (7,871 ft). There are two triangulation stations at the top of the mountain. Mount Haku can be seen from the north. Bessan Shrine (別山神社 Bessan Jinja) is a short distance from the peak. This area is part of Hakusan National Park. (Note: there is also a Mt. Bessan in located in Toyama Prefecture.)

== History ==
Mount Haku has been climbed for religious purposes for centuries. One popular hiking route from the Gifu Prefecture side of the mountains to Mount Haku's peak runs through Mount Bessan. Mount Bessan, whose name means "Separate Mountain," received its name because it is slightly separated from the south side of Mount Haku. To the south of Mount Bessan is a small flat area called the Bessan Plain (別山平 Bessan Hira) and Lake Mitarashi (御手洗池 Mitarashi Ike). Near the lake are the ruins for the Bessan Room (別山室 Bessan-ya), which was used as a rest house for those making the pilgrimage up the mountain.

== Geography ==
Though Mount Haku, the main peak in the Ryōhaku Mountains, was created by an active stratovolcano, Mount Bessan is made up of sedimentary rock. On the southern face of the mountain is a rock wall called the Taihei Wall (太平壁 Taihei-kabe). Near the peak of the mountain is the tree line made up of Siberian Dwarf Pines. In the beginning of summer, alpine plants like anemones. A wider variety of plants can be seen at lower levels, but the surrounding area is part of Japan's snow country, so it is covered by snow for more than half of the year.

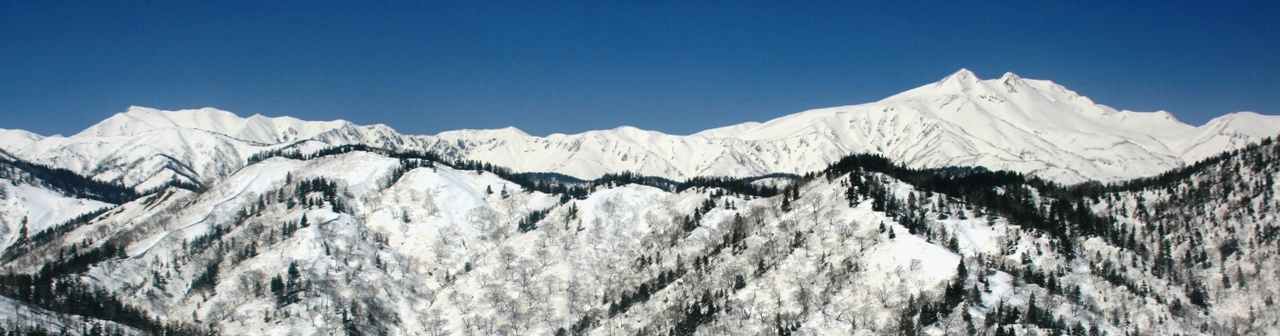
A view of Mount Bessan and Mount Haku

== See also ==
- Hakusan National Park
- Ryōhaku Mountains
