= Taichō =

Japanese monk and scholar (682–767)

Taichō 泰澄
- Born: July 20, 682; Echizen Province, Japan (now Fukui Prefecture)
- Died: April 20, 767 (aged 84)
- Known for: Climbing Mount Haku first

Taichō (泰澄; July 20, 682 – April 20, 767) was a shugendō monk in Nara period Japan. He was raised in Echizen Province, which was in the southern portion of present-day Fukui Prefecture. He was the second son of Mikami Yasuzumi (三神安角). He is said to be the first person to reach the top of Mount Haku in neighboring Kaga Province and other peaks in the Ryōhaku Mountains.

== Opened mountains ==
Taichō is said to be the first to have climbed the following mountains:

- Mount Haku
- Mount Ochizen (越智山)
- Mount Bessan
