= Mount Haku =

Dormant volcanic mountain in Japan

- 白山
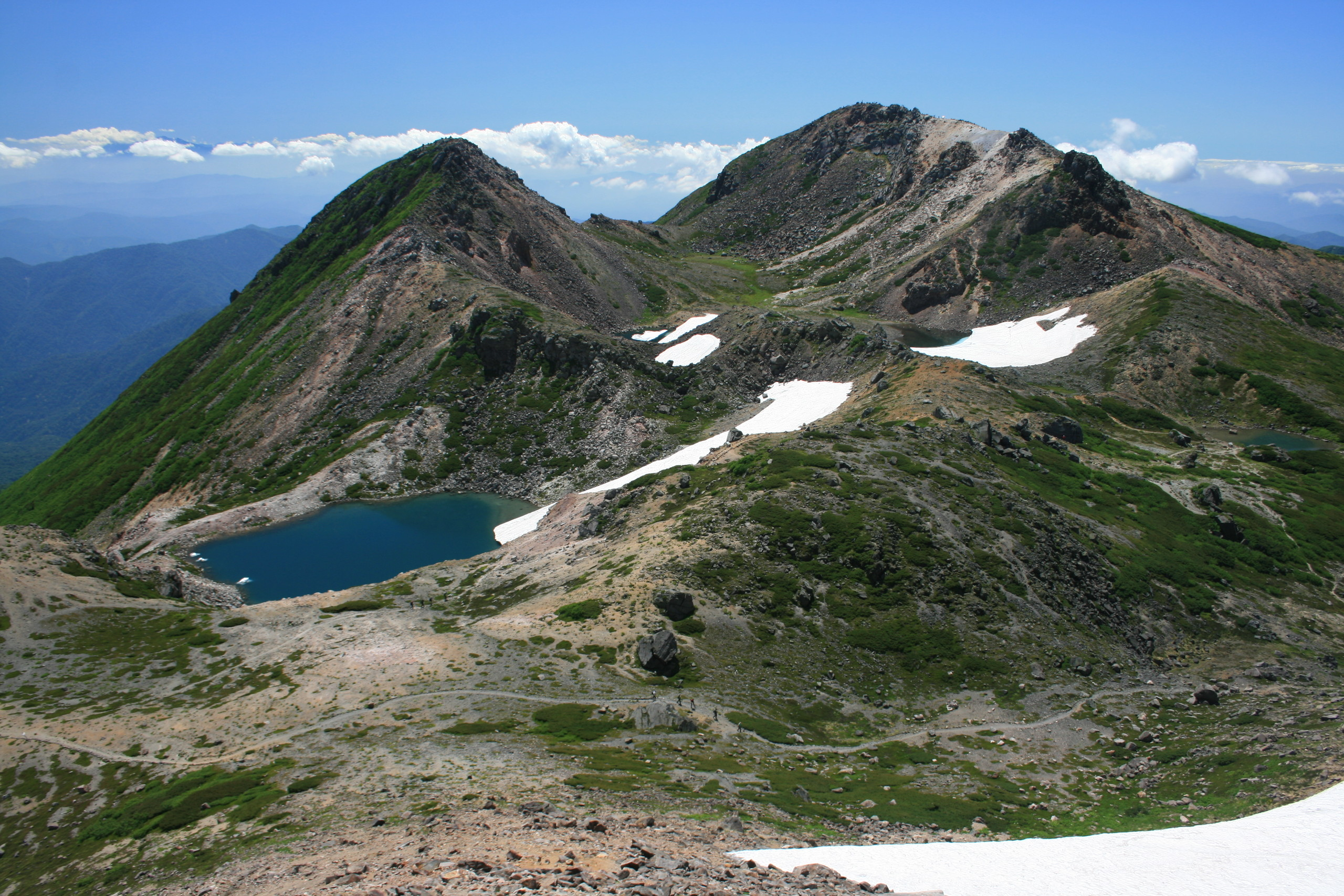
- Mount Haku seen from Onanjimine

Highest point
- Elevation: 2,702.2 m (8,865 ft)
- Prominence: 1,897 m (6,224 ft)
- Listing: List of mountains and hills of Japan by height; 100 Famous Japanese Mountains; List of volcanoes in Japan; Ultra-prominent peaks; Ribus
- Coordinates: 36°09′18″N 136°46′17″E

Naming
- English translation: White Mountain
- Language of name: Japanese
- Pronunciation: [hakɯ̥saɴ]

Geography
- Location within Japan
- Location: Gifu Prefecture; Fukui Prefecture; Ishikawa Prefecture; Japan
- Parent range: Ryōhaku Mountains
- Topo map(s): Geographical Survey Institute, 25000:1 白山, 50000:1 白山

Geology
- Rock age: 300,000–400,000 years
- Mountain type: Stratovolcano (active)
- Last eruption: April to August 1659

Climbing
- First ascent: Taichō in 717

Mount Haku (白山, Haku-san; "White Mountain"), or Hakusan, is a dormant stratovolcano in Japan. It is located on the borders of Gifu and Ishikawa, on the island of Honshu. Mount Haku is thought to have first been active 300,000 to 400,000 years ago, with the most recent eruption occurring in 1659. Along with Mount Tate and Mount Fuji, it is one of Japan's "Three Holy Mountains" (三霊山, San-rei-zan).

The mountain's tallest peak, Gozenga-mine (御前峰), is the one that gives the mountain its height of 2,702 m (8,865 ft). Along with Ken-ga-mine (剣ヶ峰), which is 2,677 m (8,783 ft), and Ōnanji-mine (大汝峰), which is 2,648 m (8,688 ft), the three peaks are considered "Mount Haku's Three Peaks" (白山三峰 Hakusan San-mine). Mount Bessan and Mount Sannomine are sometimes included and called "Mount Haku's Five Peaks" (白山五峰 Hakusan go-mine).

Because it is very prominent and clearly visible from the nearby coast, even after the surrounding mountains have lost their snow, Mount Haku still appears white, which is one explanation for the mountain's name, which means "white mountain." It is also the westernmost mountain in Japan that is over 2,000 m (6,562 ft) in height.

== History and culture ==
Taichō, a mountain Shugendo monk, first climbed Mount Hakusan in 717. For hundreds of years, people have come to Haku for prayers (白山信仰 Hakusan Shinkō). A branch shrine of Shirayama Hime Shrine, which served as the Ichinomiya for Kaga Province, is on the mountain. The Shirayama Hime Shrine is the main shrine (総本社, sō-honsha) of approximately 2,000 Hakusan shrines (白山神社, Hakusan jinja) in Japan. In 1980 an area of 48,000 ha was designated a UNESCO Man and the Biosphere Reserve.

== Nature ==
Mount Haku was designated as a quasi-national park in 1955. It became a national park in 1962 and was renamed Hakusan National Park. Because the central part of the mountain has much precipitous terrain, there are very few roads and, as a result, little human intrusion into the area. Also limiting human intrusion is the designation of the park as a Wildlife Protection Area, covering over 38,061 ha. The park stretches beyond the mountain's borders into Toyama Prefecture.

=== Geological features ===
The area surrounding Mount Haku is one of the few in Japan that contains outcroppings from the Jurassic period of the Mesozoic era. Many of Japan's typical examples of dinosaur fossils were found in this area. One of the major rock outcrops is in the Kuwashima area and is known as the "Kuwashima Fossil Wall" (桑島化石壁 Kuwashima Kasekikabe).

Because the mountain is a dormant volcano, it is well known for its many onsen.

=== Flora ===
Mount Haku is known for its diverse plant life. Along the Sabō Trail, after passing the Jinnosuke Lodge, alpine plants are found, including the chocolate lily, which is Ishikawa's prefectural plant.

There are many alpine plants which have Hakusan in their name. These include Primula cuneifolia (Hakusan Kozakura), Anemone narcissiflora (Hakusan Ichige), Dactylorhiza (Hakusan Chidori), Geranium yesoemse (Hakusan Fuuro) and Rhododendron brachycarpum (Hakusan Shakunage). These plants can be found on many mountains throughout Japan, but they were first discovered and named along the older hiking trails leading to Hakusan Shrine.

Chocolate lily (Kuro Yuri)	Primula cuneifolia (Hakusan Kozakura)	Anemone narcissiflora (Hakusan Ichige)	Dactylorhiza aristata (Hakusan Chidori)

=== Fauna ===
The golden eagle, Ishikawa's prefectural bird, lives on the slopes of Mount Haku. The rock ptarmigan, Gifu's prefectural bird, used to live on the slopes as well. During the Meiji period, the entire population of ptarmigan on the mountain disappeared; however, sightings of the grouse have recently been recorded by local residents.

== Hiking trails ==
The three most used hiking trails are the Kankō Trail (観光新道 Kankō Shinmichi), the Sabō Trail (砂防新道 Sabō Shinmichi) and the Hirase Trail (平瀬道 Hirase-dō). Both the Kankō Trail and the Sabō trail originate in the city of Hakusan, Ishikawa Prefecture, but the Hirase Trail starts from the Ōshirakawa Dam (大白川ダム) in Gifu Prefecture.

Because the area is protected as a national park, very few trails have been made on the mountain. Though the trails listed above are easy enough to hike up and down in one day, other trails can take two or three days because of the uncleared trails and rough terrain.

== Gallery ==
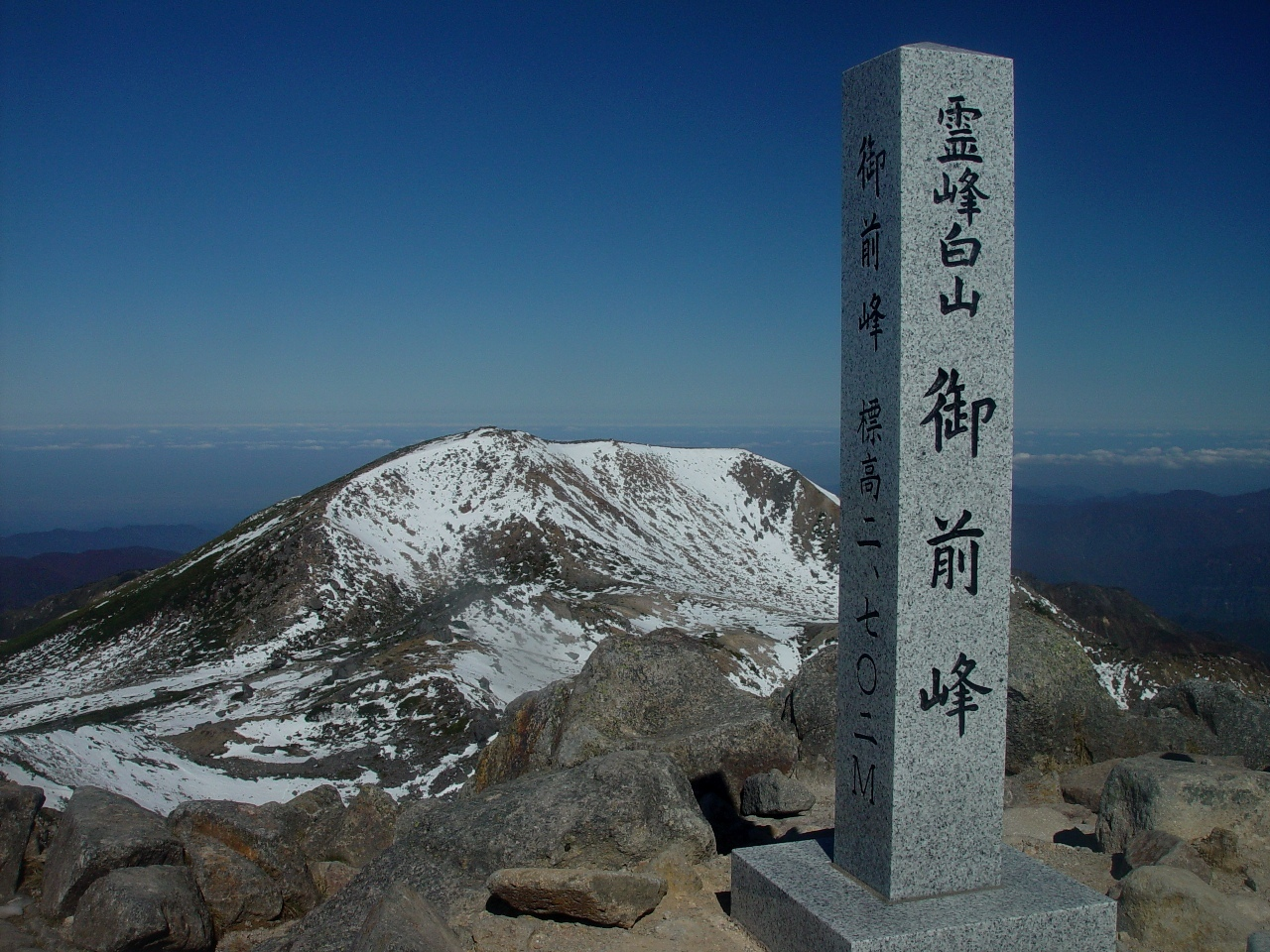
Top of Gozengamine (Mount Haku) and Ōnanjimine

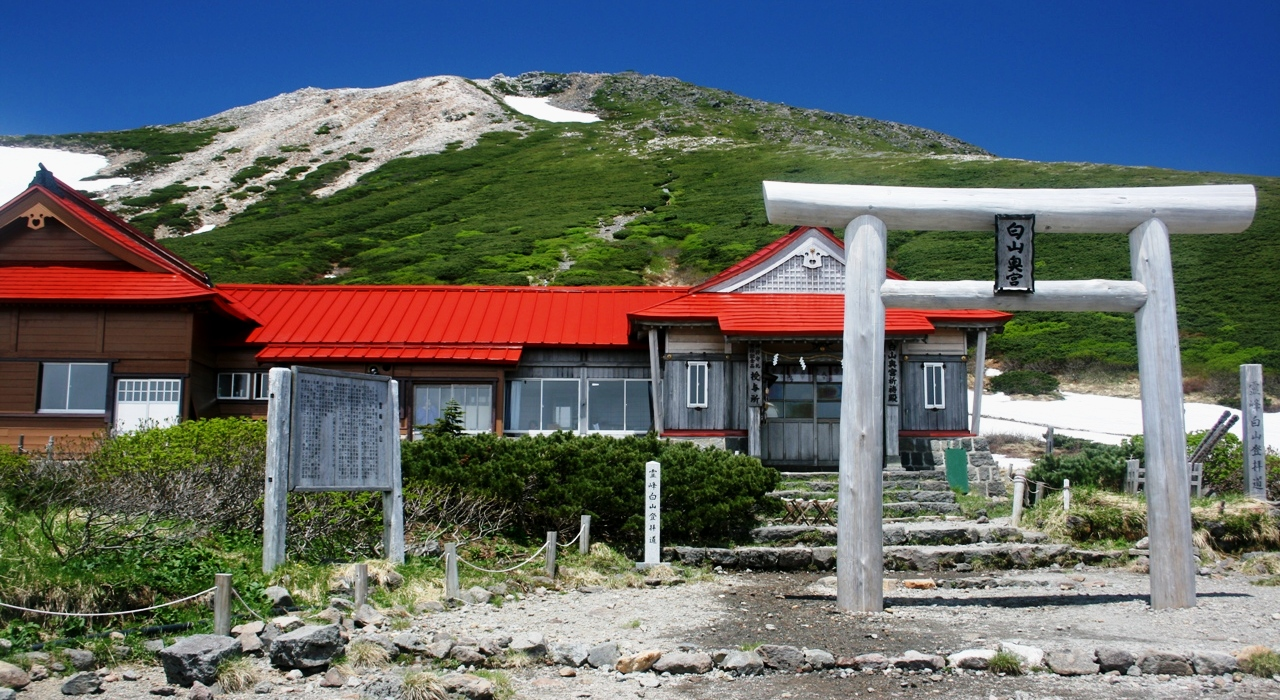
Hakusan Shrine at Murodo and Gozengamine

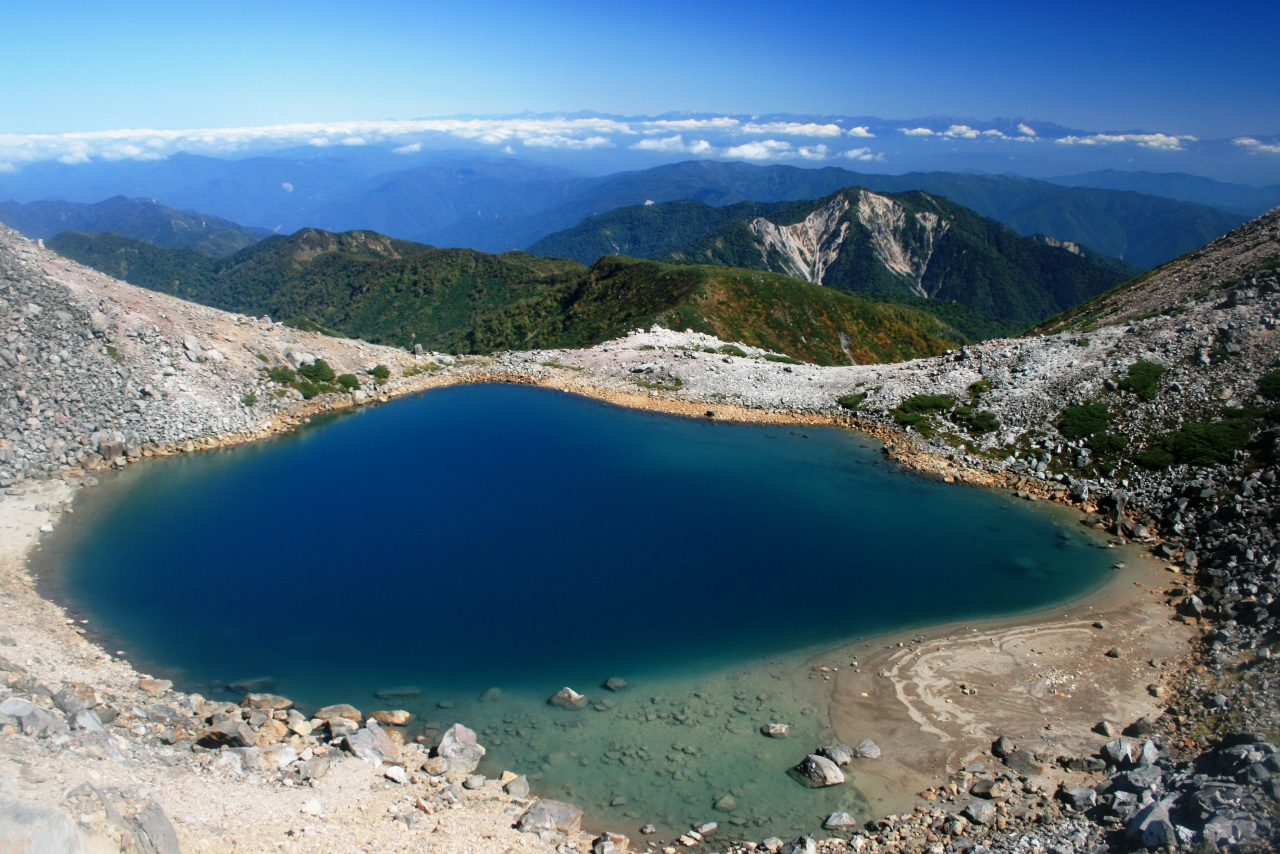
Volcanic crater (Midoriga-ike)

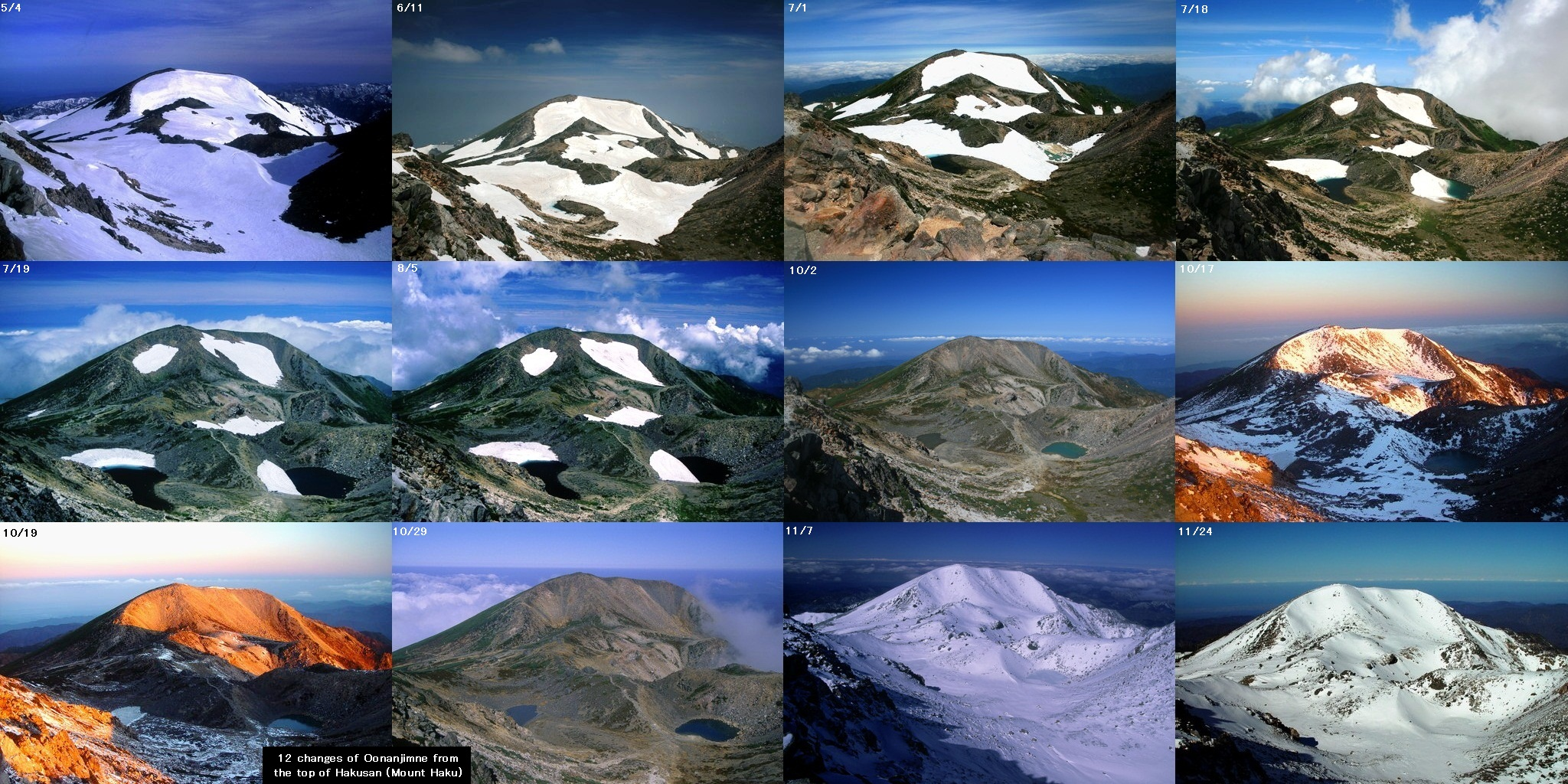
Mount Haku in each season

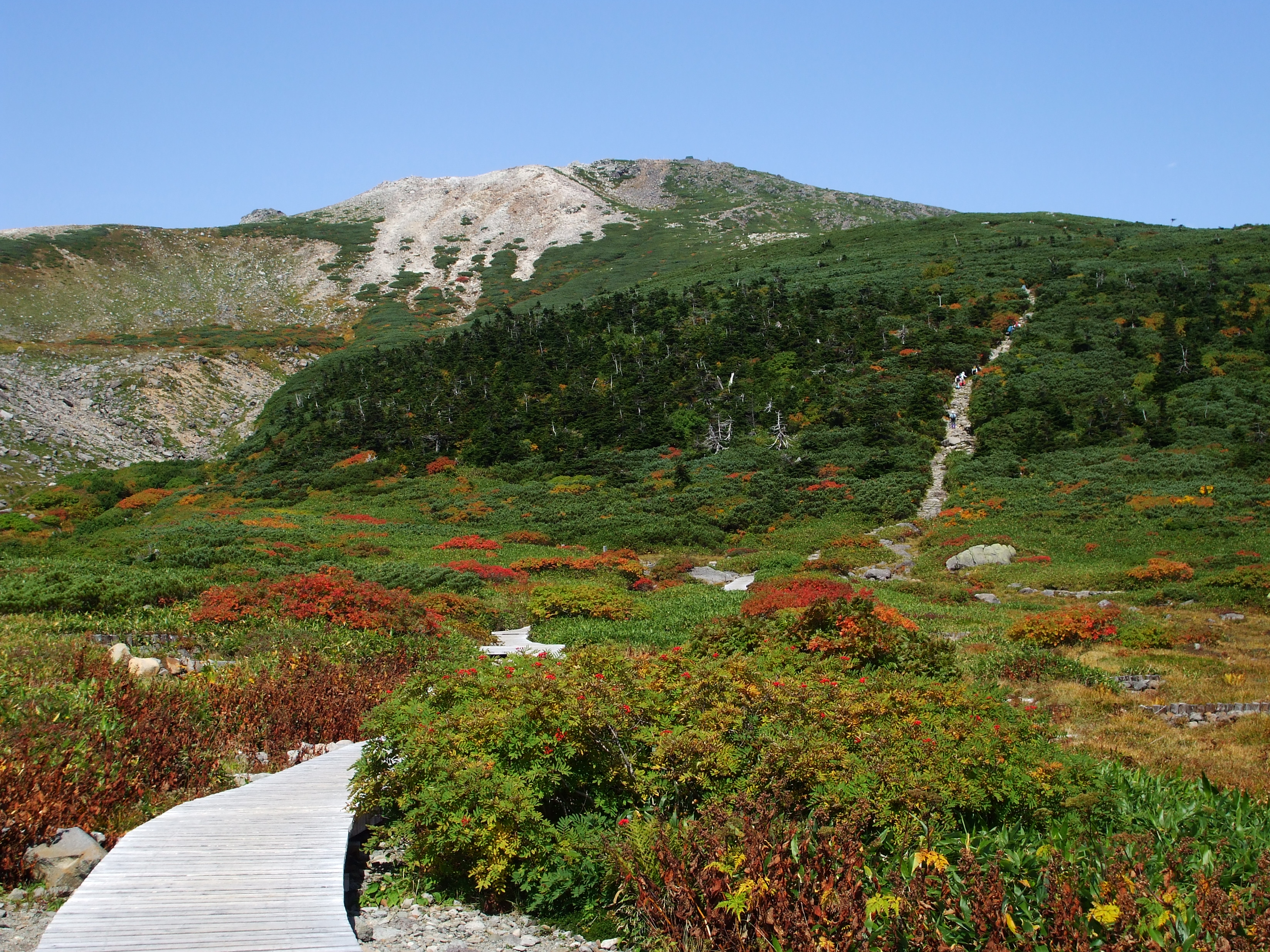
Mount Haku from Midagahara

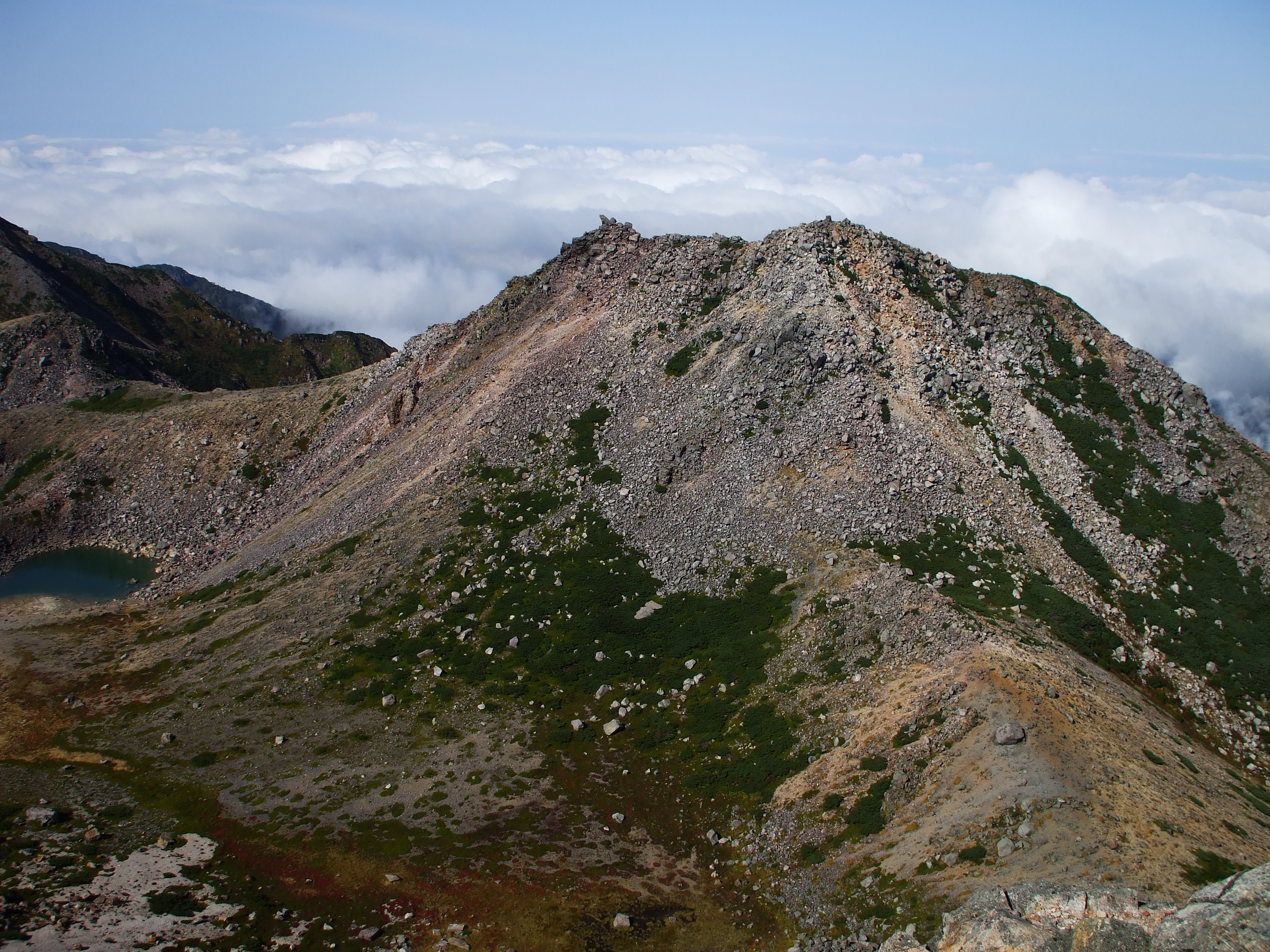
Kengamine Peak from Gozengamine Peak

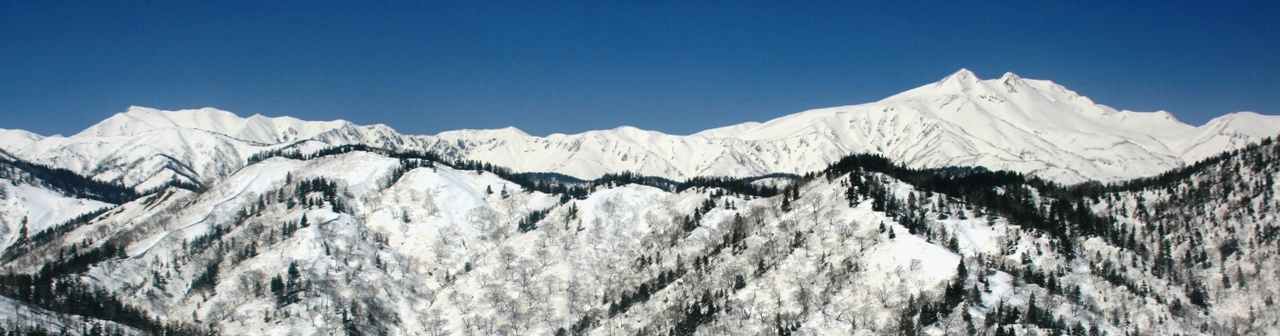
Mount Haku from east of Mount Hideri

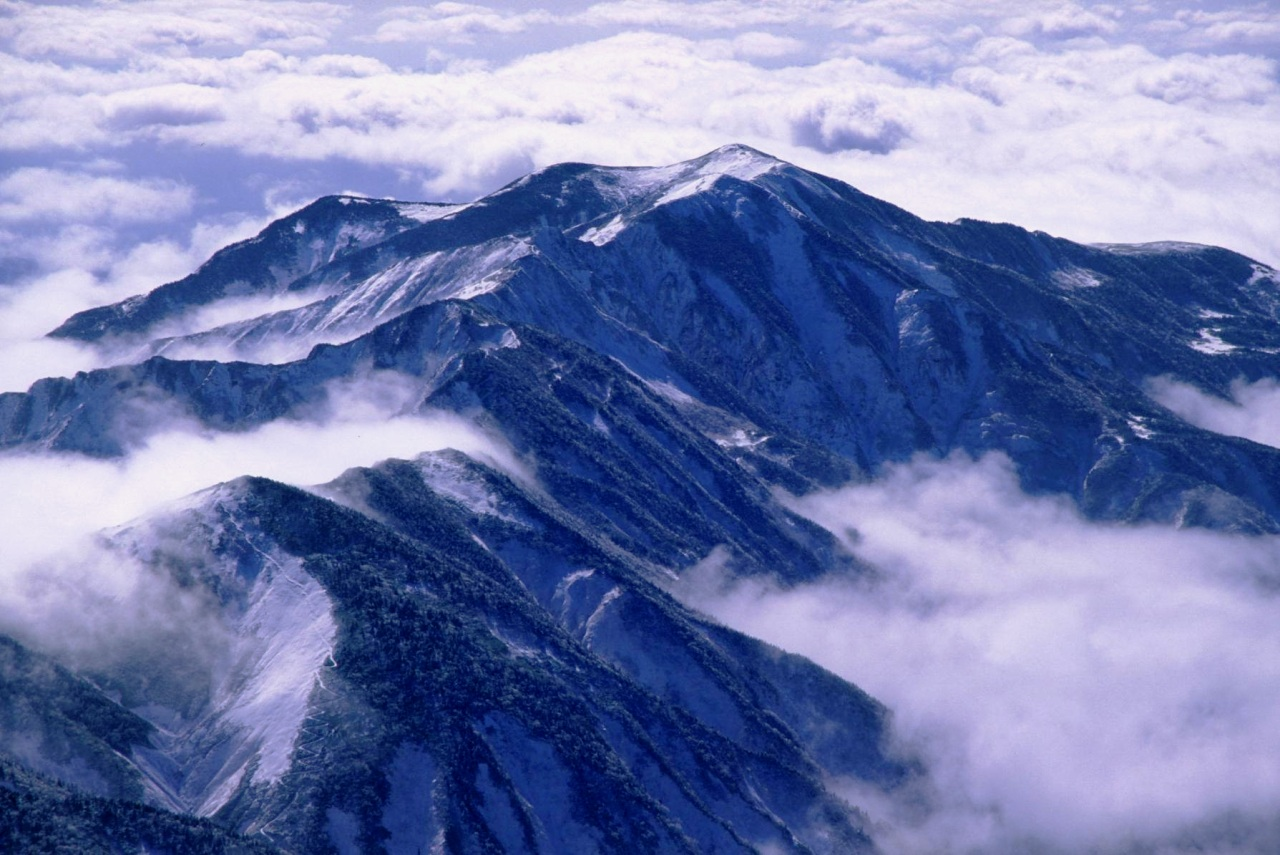
Mount Bessan from the top of Gozengamine

== See also ==
- Hakusan National Park
- Ryōhaku Mountains
- List of volcanoes in Japan
- List of mountains in Japan
- Taichō
