= Hakusan National Park =

National park in the Chubū region of Honshū, Japan

- 白山国立公園
- IUCN category II (national park)
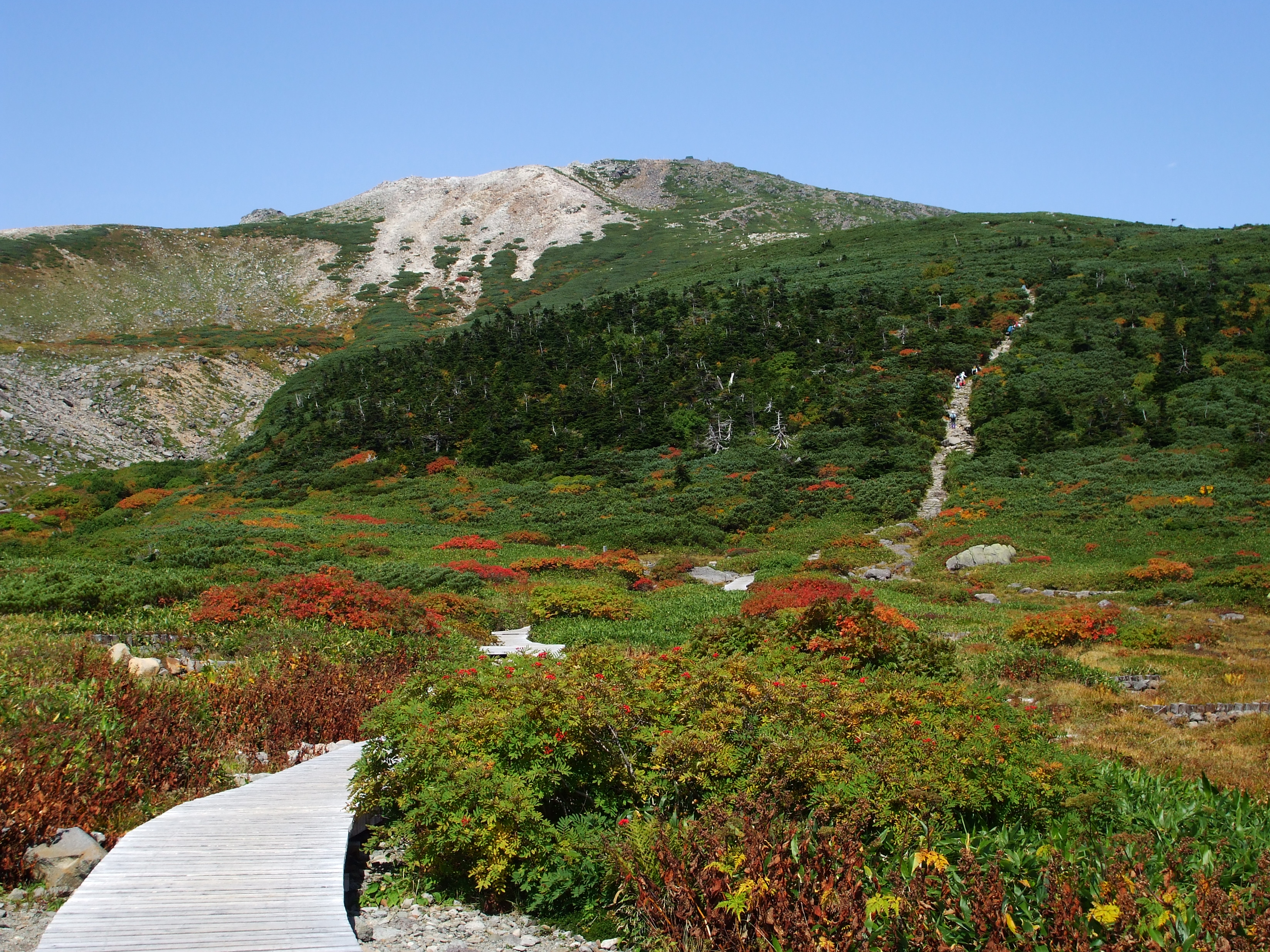
- Hakusan

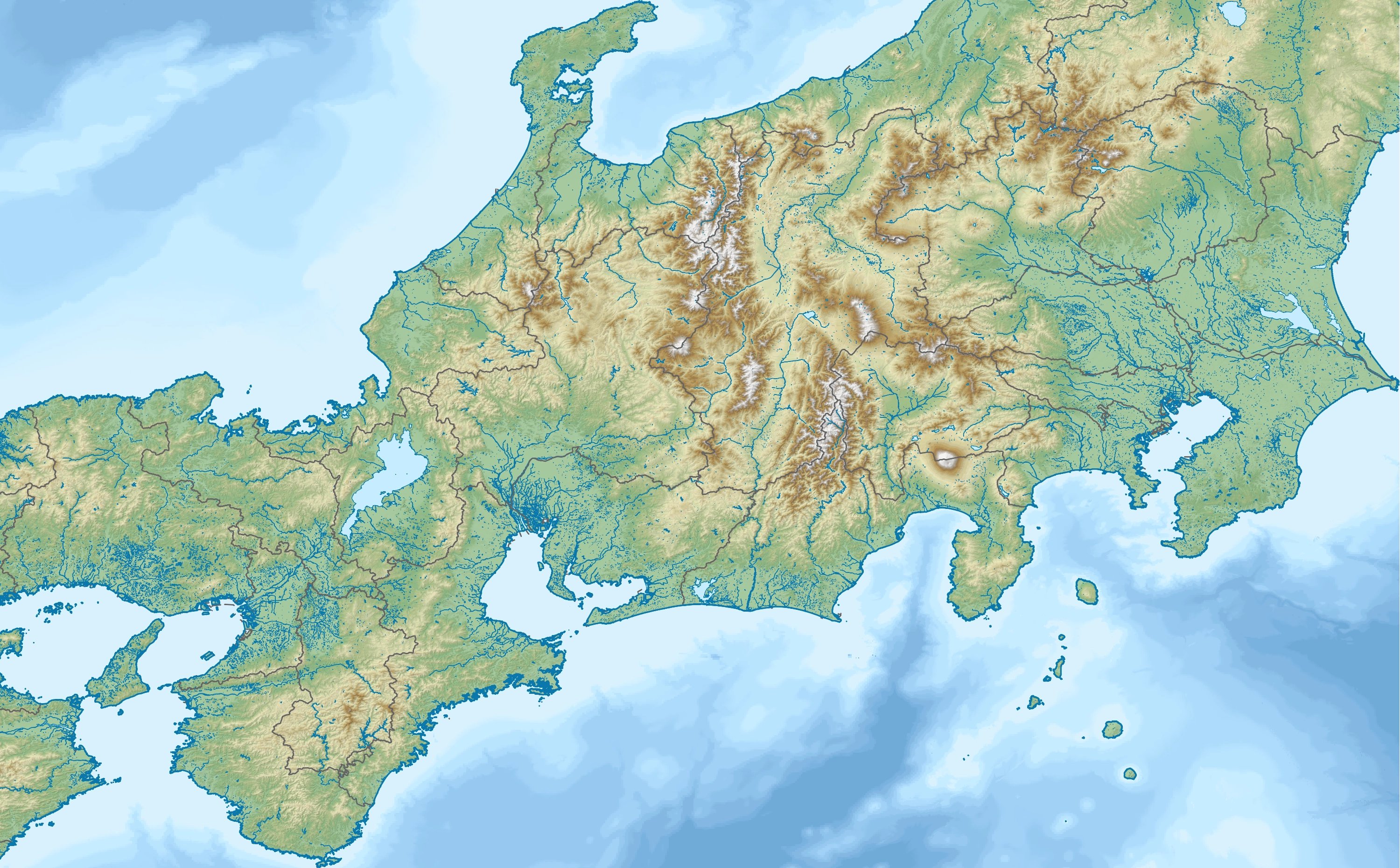
- Location within Central Japan Location within Japan
- Location: Chūbu region, Honshū, Japan
- Coordinates: 36°09′18″N 136°47′17″E
- Area: 477 km^{2} (184 mi^{2})
- Established: 12 November 1962

Hakusan National Park (白山国立公園, Hakusan Kokuritsu Kōen) is a national park in the Chūbu region of Honshū, Japan. Established in 1962, it spans the borders of Fukui, Gifu, Ishikawa, and Toyama prefectures. Its main geographical feature is Mount Haku. In 1980 an area of 480 km² corresponding to the national park was designated a UNESCO Man and the Biosphere Reserve.

== History ==
The park was originally designated Hakusan Quasi-National Park (白山国定公園, Hakusan Kokutei Kōen), in 1955. It received full national park status in 1962.

== Flora and fauna ==
The vegetation of the park ranges from warm temperate to alpine zones. The base of the mountains is covered by coniferous forests, dominated by firs, pines and Japanese cedar. Deciduous forests and woodlands, dominated by Mongolian oak and Japanese beech are present. At higher elevations there are open landscapes.

Hakusan is home to the golden eagle, the mountain hawk-eagle and several larger mammal species typical for the Japanese islands, like Japanese macaque, Asiatic black bear, Japanese serow and Sika deer.

== Sites of interest ==
Mount Akausagi (赤兎山), Mount Haku, Heisen-ji Hakusan Jinja (平泉寺白山神社), Hyakuyojō falls (百四丈滝), Kyō Mountains (経ヶ岳), Shiramizu falls (白水滝)

== Neighboring municipalities ==
- Fukui: Ōno, Katsuyama
- Gifu: Gujō, Takayama, Shirakawa, Gifu
- Ishikawa: Hakusan
- Toyama: Nanto

== See also ==
- List of national parks of Japan
