= List of dams in Fukui Prefecture =

The following is a list of dams in Fukui Prefecture, Japan.

== List ==
Name	Location	Started	Opened	Height	Length	Image	DiJ number
Asuwagawa Dam		2006		96 m (315 ft)			0952
Busyu-ko Dam		1916	1920	20.3 m (67 ft)	91.5 m (300 ft)		0936
Eiheiji Dam		1991	2001	55 m (180 ft)	177 m (581 ft)		3122
Futatsuya-Toshuko Dam			2005	24.7 m (81 ft)			3328
Hotokebara Dam		1968	1968	48.6 m (159 ft)	141 m (463 ft)		0941
Itoshiro Dam		1968		32 m (105 ft)			0940
Jodojigawa Dam		1989	2008	72 m (236 ft)	233 m (764 ft)		3038
Kaitani Dam		1972	1977	24.5 m (80 ft)	50 m (160 ft)		0946
Kumokawa Dam		1952	1957	39 m (128 ft)			0938
Kuzuryu Dam		1962	1968	128 m (420 ft)			0942
Managawa Dam		1966	1977	127.5 m (418 ft)			0947
Masutani Dam		1981	2005	100.4 m (329 ft)			0951
Ogurami Dam			1900	15.3 m (50 ft)			3430
Ohara Dam		1963	1964	35.5 m (116 ft)	77.8 m (255 ft)		0937
Ohtsuro Dam		1989	2011	40.6 m (133 ft)	158.5 m (520 ft)		3039
Ryugahana Dam		1968	1988	79.5 m (261 ft)	215 m (705 ft)		0950
Sasogawa Dam		1952	1957	76 m (249 ft)			0939
Sogatani Dam		1975	1980	31.4 m (103 ft)	113.5 m (372 ft)		0948
Takinami Dam		1978	1986	30.3 m (99 ft)	136.3 m (447 ft)		0949
Washi Dam		1965	1968	45 m (148 ft)			0944
Yanbara Dam		1965	1968	23 m (75 ft)			0943
Yoshinosegawa Dam		1986		58 m (190 ft)	190 m (620 ft)		2951

== See also ==
- Media related to Dams in Fukui prefecture at Wikimedia Commons
