= Managawa Dam =

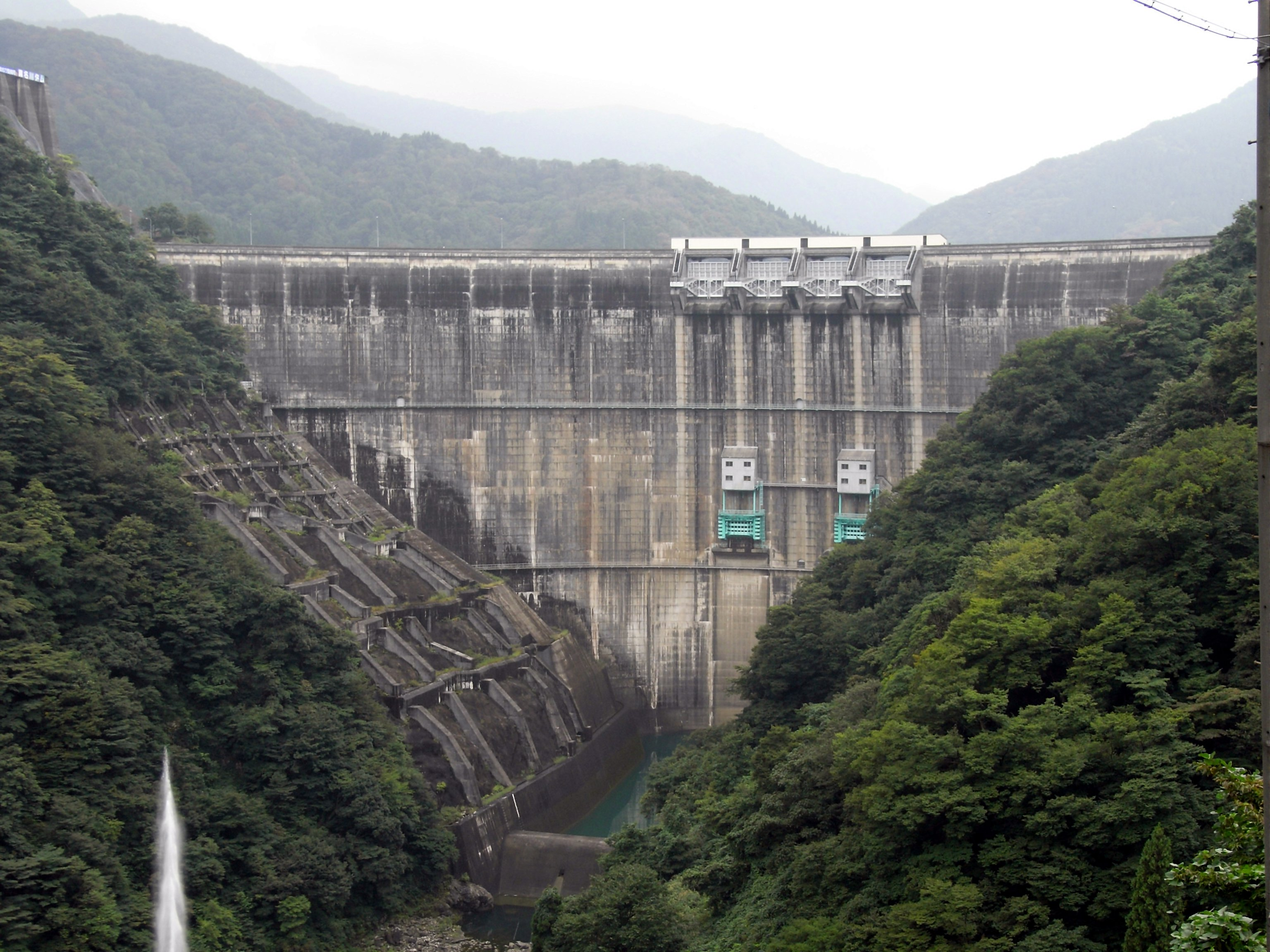

- Location within Fukui Prefecture Location within Japan
- Location: Ōno, Fukui Prefecture, Japan
- Coordinates: 35°55′05″N 136°32′31″E
- Construction began: 1966
- Opening date: 1977

Dam and spillways
- Height: 127.5 m (418 ft)
- Length: 357.0 m (1,171.3 ft)

Reservoir
- Total capacity: 115,000,000 m^{3}
- Catchment area: 223.7 km^{2}
- Surface area: 293 hectares

Managawa Power Station
- Installed capacity: 14,000kW

Managawa Dam (真名川ダム, Managawa-damu) is a dam located in the city of Ōno in Fukui Prefecture. Japan.

Managawa Dam was built as part of the Managawa River Comprehensive Development Project for the development of the Kuzuryū River basin in Fukui prefecture from 1950, for flood control, water for agriculture and to supply the cities of Fukui and Ōno and for hydroelectric power generation. During torrential rains in 1965, the capacity of Sasogawa Dam was greatly overwhelmed, and considerable damage occurred to the dam and to downstream settlements. Construction on Managawa Dam began in 1967 partly in response to this natural disaster, and the dam was completed in 1977. The arch-shaped concrete dam has a height of 127.5 meters.

The associated Managawa Power Station was initially operated by Fukui Prefecture, but in 2010 was transferred to Hokuriku Electric Power Company.
