= Yanbara Dam =

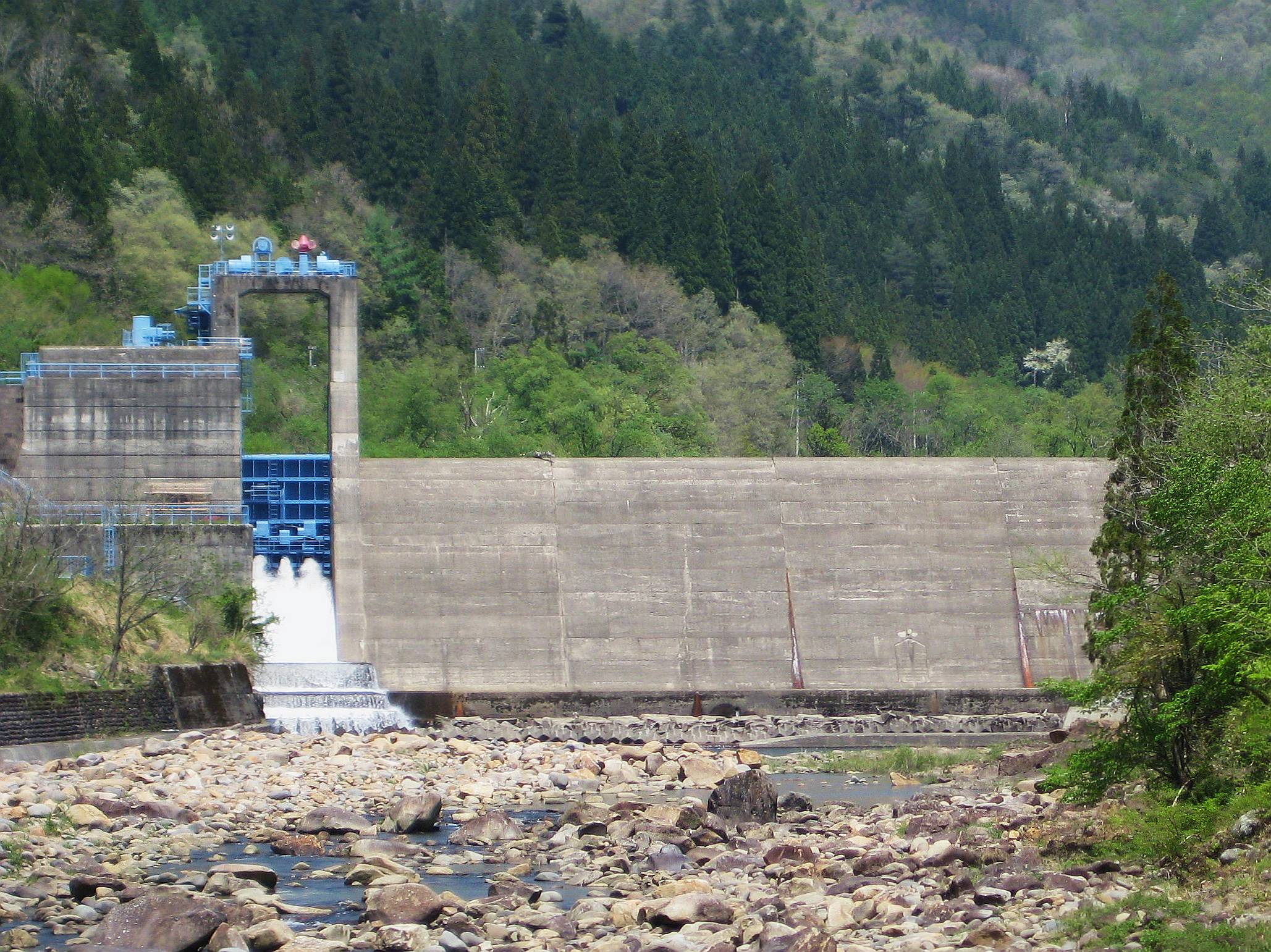

- Location within Fukui Prefecture Location within Japan
- Location: Ōno, Fukui Prefecture, Japan
- Coordinates: 35.92018611°N 136.6725278°E
- Construction began: 1965
- Opening date: 1968

Dam and spillways
- Impounds: Itoshiro River
- Height: 23 m (75 ft)
- Length: 114.6 m (376 ft)

Reservoir
- Total capacity: 900,000 m^{3}
- Catchment area: 333.6 km^{2}

Yugami Power Station
- Installed capacity: 54,000kW

Yanbara Dam (山原ダーム, Yanbara-damu) is a hydroelectric dam on the Itoshiro River, in the city of Ōno, Fukui prefecture, Japan. It is upriver of the confluence of the Itoshiro River and the larger Kuzuryū River.

The Yanbara Dam is located between the Washi Dam and the Yugami Hydroelectric Power Station, for which it provided a pumped storage facility. The dam is a gravity dam, with a height of 23 meters and length of 114.6 meters. Construction began in 1965 and was completed by 1968.
