= Asuwa River =

Coordinates: 36°04′33″N 136°11′00″E

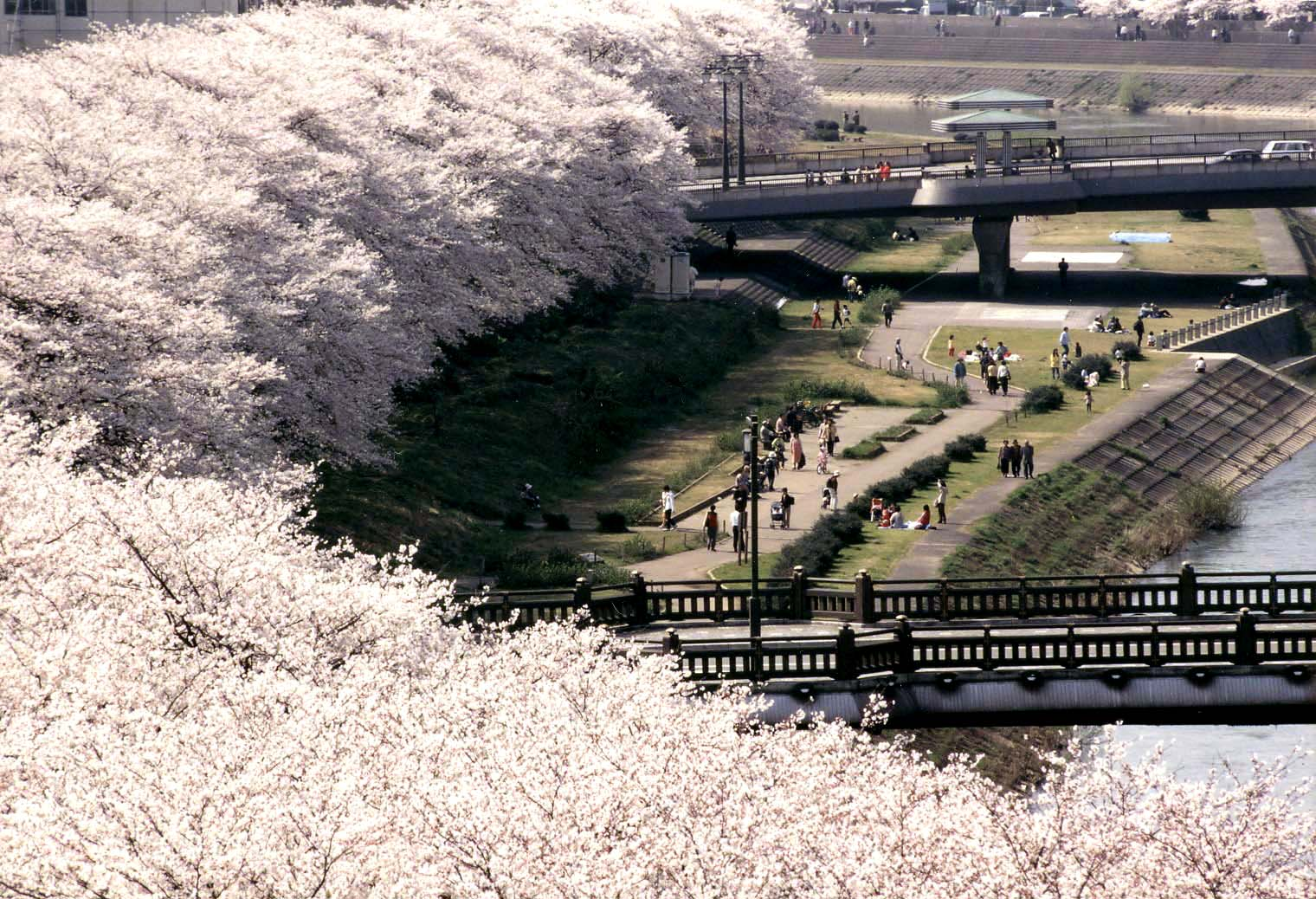
- The Asuwa River in April in central Fukui

- Location within Japan
- Native name: 足羽川 (Japanese)

Location
- Country: Japan

Physical characteristics
- Source
  - location: Mount Kanmuri
  - elevation: 1,257 m (4,124 ft)
- Mouth
  - location: Hino River
- Length: 61.7 km (38.3 mi)
- Basin size: 415 km^{2} (160 sq mi)

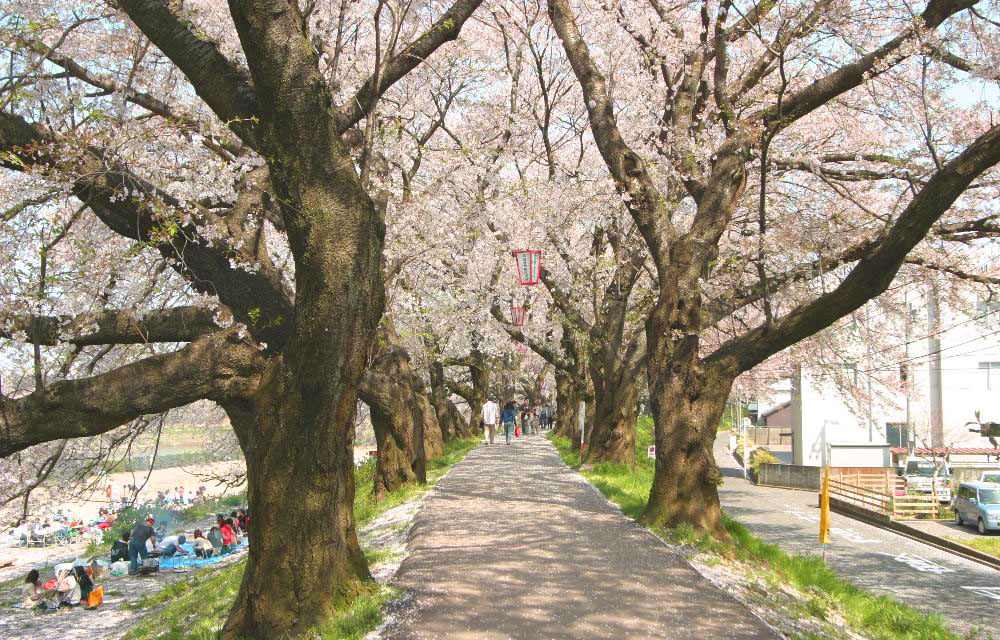
Cherry blossoms along the Asuwa River

The Asuwa River (足羽川, Asuwa-gawa) is a river in Fukui Prefecture, Japan. It stretches 61.7 km (38 mi) from Mount Kanmuri in the town of Ikeda to the Hino and the Kuzuryū rivers.

== Row of Sakura ==
About 600 cherry trees are planted along the levees in the center of the city of Fukui. Many cherry trees are lit up every year when they are in full bloom (early to mid-April), leading many visitors to come see the blossoms on the levee. Other nearby places with famous cherry trees include Maruoka Castle and the Ichijōdani Asakura Family Historic Ruins.

== River communities ==
The river passes through the following communities:

Fukui Prefecture
Ikeda, Fukui
