= Ryūsō Falls =

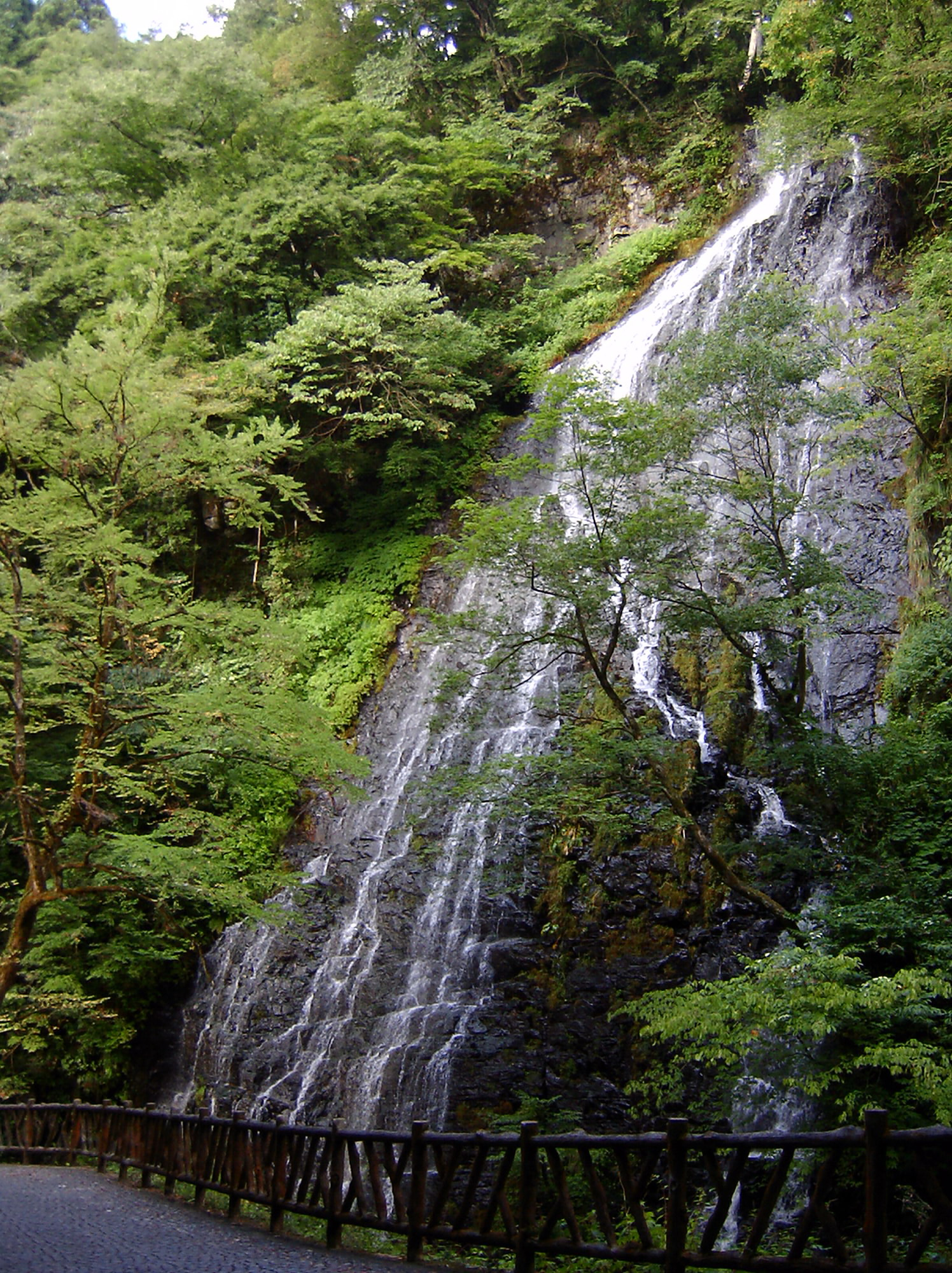

- Location within Fukui Prefecture Location within Japan
- Location: Ikeda, Fukui Prefecture, Japan
- Coordinates: 35°55′22″N 136°25′15″E
- Type: multi-step
- Total height: 60 m (200 ft)
- Average width: 20 m (66 ft)
- Watercourse: Kuzuryū River

Ryūsō Falls (龍双ケ滝, Ryūsō-no-taki) is a waterfall in the town of Ikeda, Fukui Prefecture, Japan, on a branch of the Kuzuryū River.

It is one of "Japan’s Top 100 Waterfalls", per a listing published by the Japanese Ministry of the Environment in 1990.

== See also ==
- List of waterfalls
- List of waterfalls in Japan
