= Washi Dam =

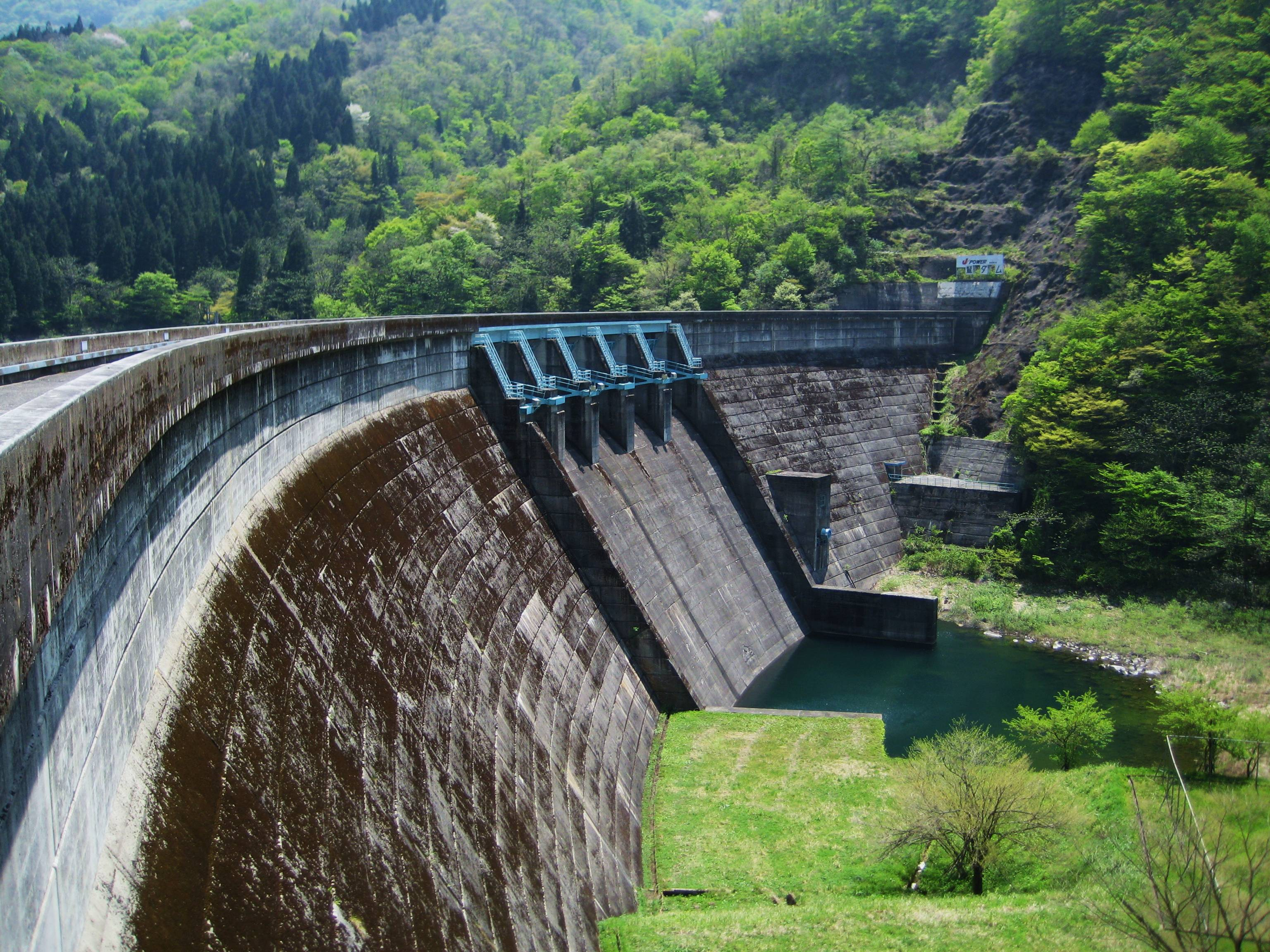

- Location within Fukui Prefecture Location within Japan
- Official name: 鷲ダム
- Location: Ōno, Fukui Prefecture, Japan
- Coordinates: 35.92°N 136.673°E
- Purpose: Power generation
- Construction began: 1965
- Opening date: 1968
- Operator: Electric Power Development Company

Dam and spillways
- Impounds: Kuzuryu River
- Height: 45 m (148 ft)
- Length: 277 m (909 ft)

Reservoir
- Total capacity: 9,650,000 m^{3}
- Catchment area: 334.3 km^{2}
- Surface area: 62 hectares (150 acres)

Yujo Power Station
- Installed capacity: 54,000 kW

Washi Dam (鷲ダム, Washi damu) is a hydroelectric power Arch-gravity dam on the Kuzuryū River system in the city of Ōno in Fukui Prefecture, Japan. The dam has a height of 45 meters and is owned by the Electric Power Development Company (J-Power). It is paired with the Nagano Power Station and the Kuzuryu Dam as a Pumped-storage reservoir.

Construction of the dam began in 1957; however, the pumped storage facility was not part of the original design and was added later at the insistence of the Ministry of International Trade and Industry. The dam was completed in 1968.
