= Itoshiro River =

Coordinates: 35°54′18″N 136°40′08″E

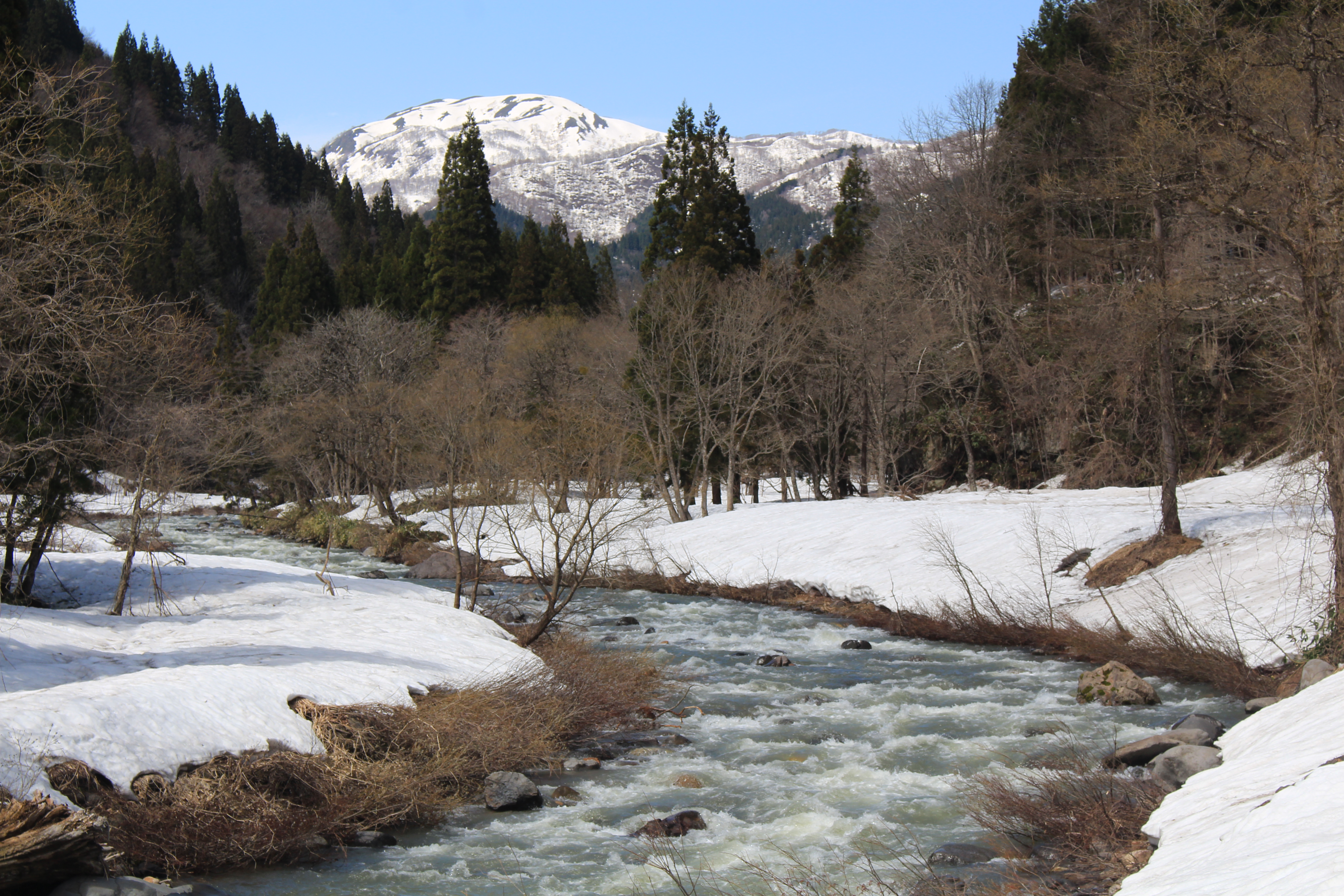
- Mount Chōshi and Itoshiro River

- Native name: 石徹白川 (Japanese)

Location
- Country: Japan

Physical characteristics
- Source
  - location: Mount Chōshi
  - elevation: 1,810 m (5,940 ft)
- Mouth
  - location: Kuzuryū River

Basin features
- River system: Kuzuryū River

The Itoshiro River (石徹白川, Itoshiro-gawa) is a river through Gifu and Fukui prefectures in Japan.

== Geography ==
The Ishitoro River flows from Mount Chōshi (銚子ヶ峰 Chōshi-ga-mine) on the borders of Gujō and Takayama in Gifu Prefecture and flows south before emptying into the Kuzuryū River near Ōno in Fukui Prefecture.

There are two majors dams along the river, both in Ōno: the Itoshiro Dam (石徹白ダム Itoshiro Damu) and the Yanbara Dam (山原ダム Yanbara Damu).
