= Asuwagawa Dam =

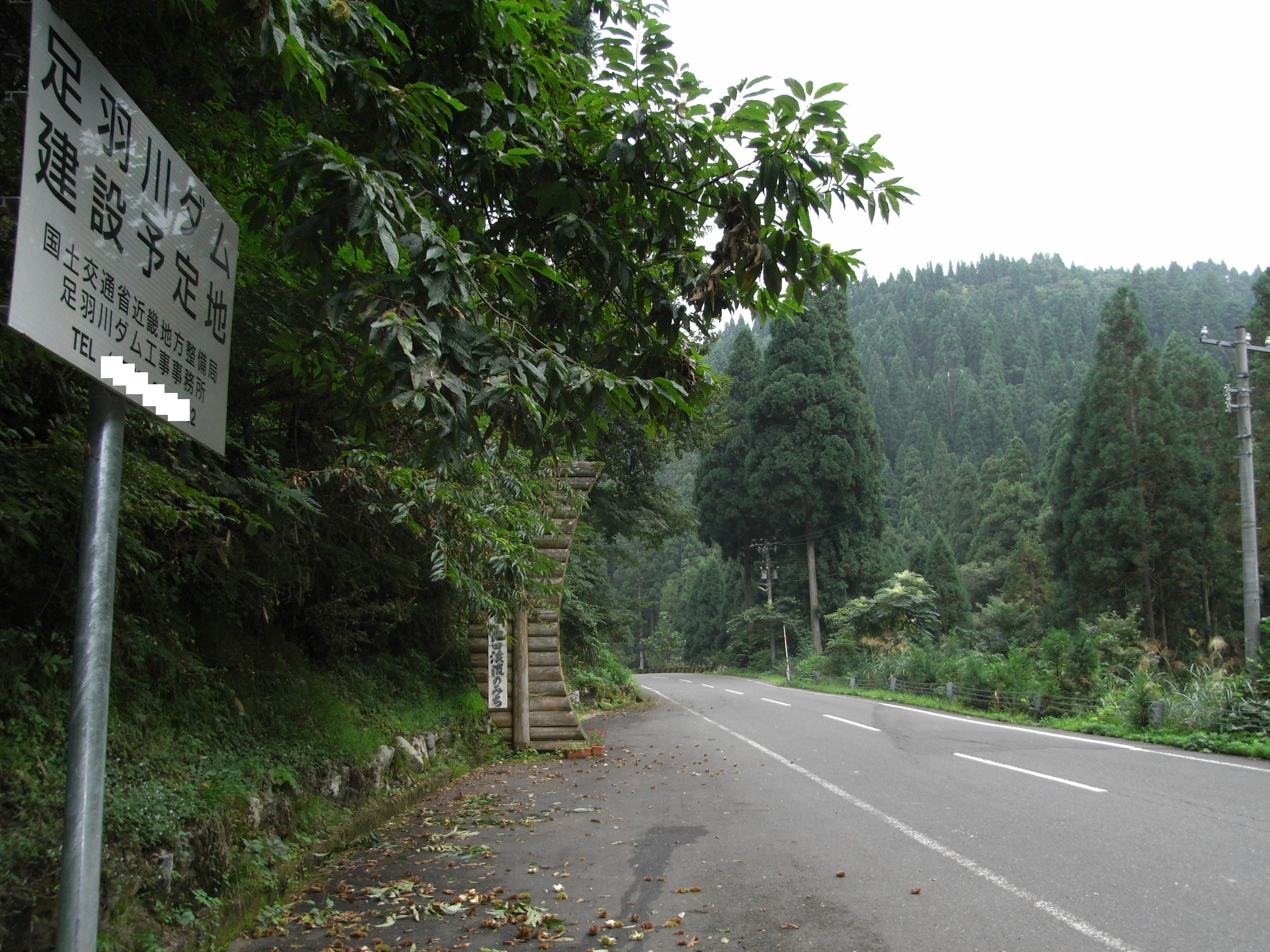

- Location within Fukui Prefecture Location within Japan
- Official name: 足羽川ダム
- Location: Ikeda, Fukui Prefecture, Japan
- Coordinates: 35°56′05″N 136°22′35″E
- Purpose: flood control
- Construction began: 2006

Dam and spillways
- Impounds: Bekogawa River
- Height: 96.0 m (315.0 ft)
- Length: 460.0 m (1,509.2 ft)

Reservoir
- Total capacity: 28,700,000 m^{3}
- Catchment area: 105.2 km^{2}
- Surface area: 94 hectares

The Asuwagawa Dam (足羽川ダム) is a flood-control concrete Arch-gravity dam in the town of Ikeda in Fukui Prefecture, Japan owned by the Japanese Ministry of Land, Infrastructure, Transport and Tourism.

As the Asuwa River is part of the Kuzuryū River system which flows through the city of Fukui and which was subject to frequent flooding, various flood control projects were planned from the year 1900. A plan to build an auxiliary multipurpose dam on the Asuwa River was finalised in 1967, but no work was actually begun until 1994. Then project immediately encountered strong opposition by the residents of the site to be submerged. Some 220 households were involved, and compensation negotiations were protracted and difficult. Meanwhile, the political momentum of reviewing public works projects has increased nationwide and in 1997 the project was indefinitely frozen.

In July 2004, concentrated torrential rains attacked Fukui Prefecture, especially the Asuwa broke its embankments. In Fukui city, 14,172 houses were flooded and five people were killed. The project for a dam on the Asugawa River was revived, despite ongoing opposition from local residents and the Japan Communist Party, both of whom pushed for embankment widening and reinforcement over a dam. Despite the ongoing opposition, construction work began in July 2006.

The design was a modified gravity type concrete dam. Initial plans called for a multipurpose dam; however, to placate local residents and in light of reduced demand for water, the design was changed to a specialised flood control dam. Unlike ordinary dams, the Asugawa Dam stores very little water, as the design has large tunnels in its base to permit the river to flow through the dam "as is". This so-called "perforated dam" stores water only during floods. Therefore, although the Asuwawa reservoir is usually empty, when flooding occurs it stores water and gradually releases downstream. Initially, the dam height was 130.0 m and the total water storage capacity was 72,000,000 tons, but in the final plan, the dam was reduced to 96.0 m and the total water storage capacity to 28,700,000 tons.

Concrete pouring was completed on October 30, 2026.
