= Ikeda, Fukui =

Ikeda 池田町
- Town
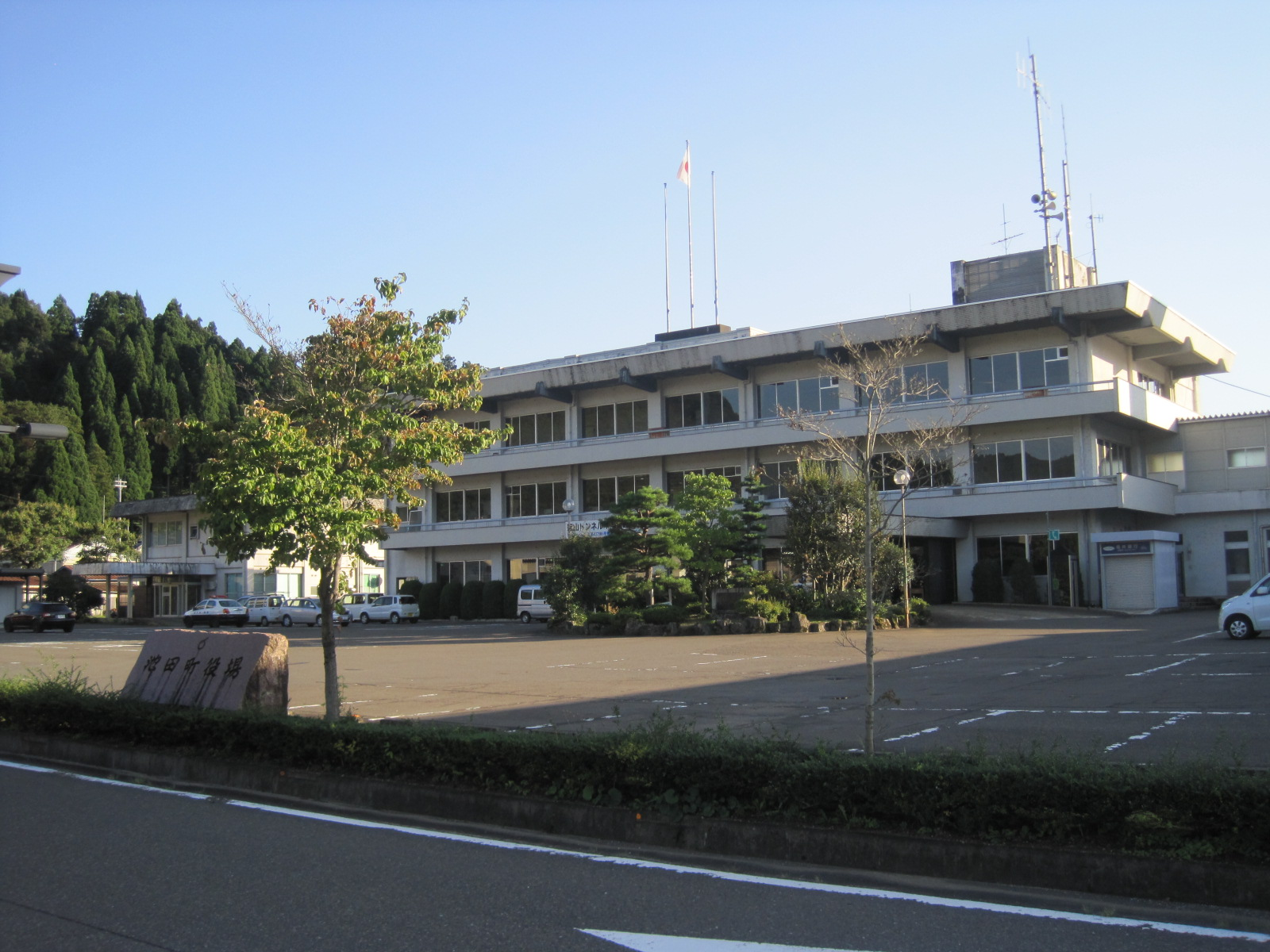
- Ikeda Town Hall

- Flag Seal

- Location of Ikeda in Fukui Prefecture

- Coordinates: 35°53′25″N 136°20′39″E
- Country: Japan
- Region: Chūbu (Hokuriku)
- Prefecture: Fukui
- District: Imadate

Area
  - Total: 194.65 km^{2} (75.15 sq mi)

Population (January 2026)
  - Total: 2,107
  - Density: 10.82/km^{2} (28.04/sq mi)
- Time zone: UTC+9 (Japan Standard Time)
- Phone number: 0778-44-6000
- Address: 35-4 Inari, Ikeda-chō, Imadate-gun, Fukui-ken 910-2512
- Website: www.town.ikeda.fukui.jp
- Symbols
- Flower: Rhododendron subg. Hymenanthes
- Tree: Cryptomeria

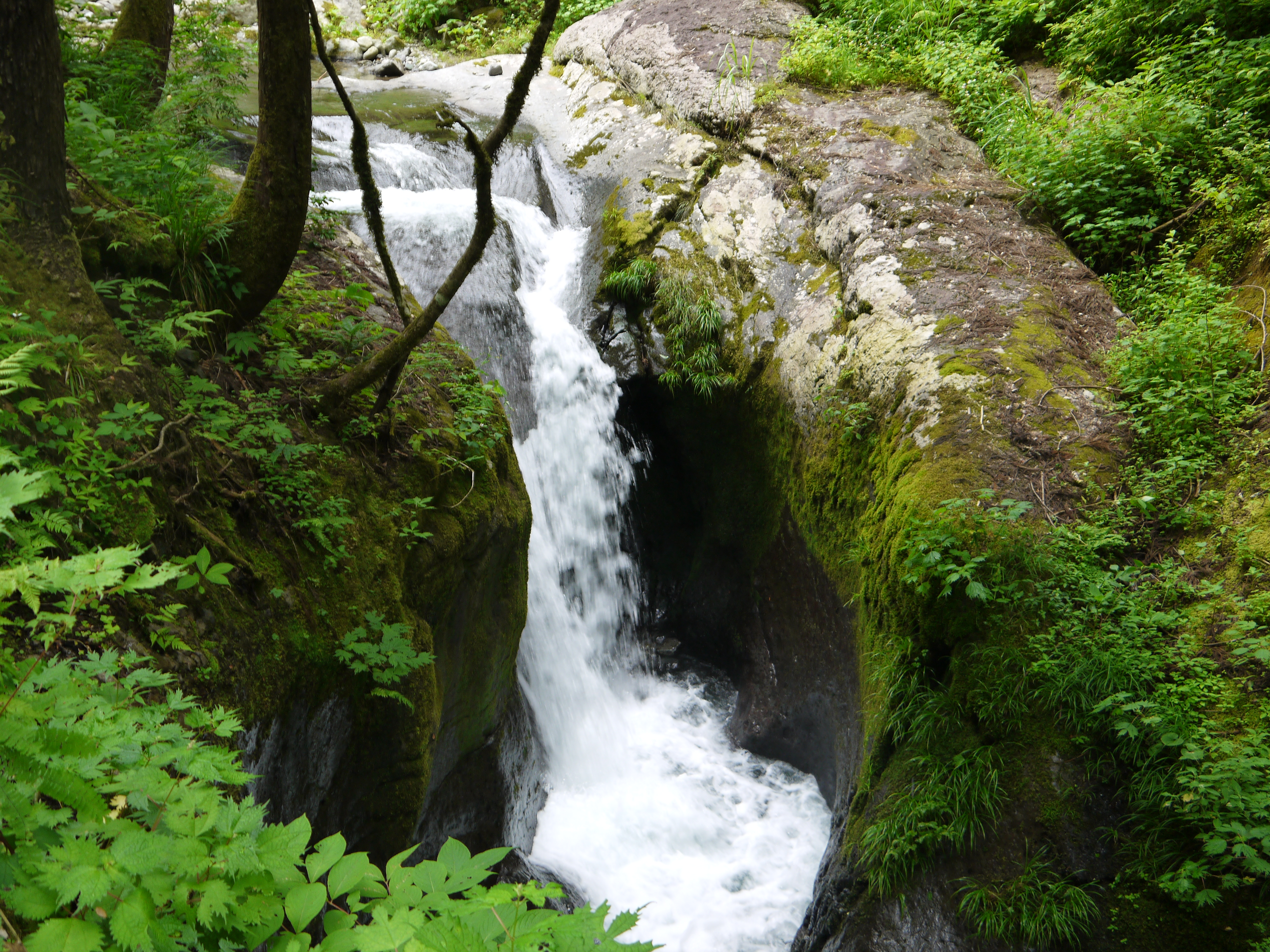
Ryūsō Falls, one of "Japan’s Top 100 Waterfalls",

Ikeda (池田町, Ikeda-chō) is a town located in Fukui Prefecture, Japan. As of 31 January 2026, the town had an estimated population of 2,107 in 867 households and the population density of 11 persons per km^{2}. The total area of the town was 194.65 square kilometres (75.15 sq mi).

== Geography ==
Ikeda is located in the Imadate District, of central Fukui Prefecture, bordered by Gifu Prefecture to the south, Shiga Prefecture to the south and surrounded by mountains on all sides. Mount Kanmuri is the highest elevation at 1256 meters. The Asuwa River flows through the town. Ikeda consists mostly of narrow agricultural plains and small villages between steep, 1000–1500 meter mountains in a main north–south valley and several branch valleys. The main residential area is a small valley at an altitude of about 150–250 meters. The setting of the town, the old shrine in the town center, and a beautiful waterfall on the lower road to Ono are all local landmarks and are praised for their beauty, and occasionally attract tour buses from as far away as Osaka. Ikeda endures heavy snowfall in the winter, and access to neighboring towns, over mountain passes except to the north, can be difficult. The mountain roads leading east to Ono and south from Ikeda to Imajo and the especially dramatic road to Kinomoto in neighboring Shiga Prefecture are officially closed from November to May.

=== Neighbouring municipalities ===
Fukui Prefecture

- Echizen
- Echizen (town)
- Fukui
- Ōno
- Sabae

=== Climate ===
Ikeda has a humid subtropical climate (Cfa per the Köppen climate classification system) characterized by warm, wet summers and cold winters with heavy snowfall. The average annual temperature in Ikeda is 13.0 °C. The average annual rainfall is 2362 mm with September as the wettest month. The temperatures are highest on average in August, at around 25.7 °C, and lowest in January, at around 1.2 °C. Parts of the town are located within the extremely heavy snowfall area of Japan.

== Demographics ==
Per Japanese census data, the population of Ikeda has declined by more than half over the past 50 years.

Historical population
Year	Pop.	±%
1970	5,524	—
1980	4,510	−18.4%
1990	4,203	−6.8%
2000	3,759	−10.6%
2010	3,046	−19.0%
2020	2,423	−20.5%

== History ==
Ikeda is part of ancient Echizen Province. During the Edo period, the area was mostly part of the holdings of Sabae Domain under the Tokugawa shogunate. Following the Meiji restoration, and the establishment of the modern municipalities it was organised into part of Imadate District in Fukui Prefecture. Ikeda was formed on March 31, 1955, by the merger of the two former villages of Kami-Ikeda and Shimo-Ikeda.

== Government ==
Ikeda has a mayor-council form of government with a directly elected mayor and a unicameral town legislature of eight members. Ikeda contributes one member to the Fukui Prefectural Assembly. In terms of national politics, the town is part of the Fukui 1st district of the lower house of the Diet of Japan.

== Economy ==
Ikeda's economy is almost exclusively agricultural, with over two-thirds of all households registered as farmers. Rice is the main focus of the town's production, and the town is promoting organic farming.

== Education ==
Ikeda has one public elementary school and one middle school operated by the city government. The town had one public high school operated by the Fukui Prefectural Board of Education, which closed in 2019.

== Transportation ==
=== Railway ===
Ikeda has no public passenger railway service. Echizen-Takefu Station on the Hokuriku Shinkansen is the closest station (about 18 kilometers to the town hall).

=== Highway ===
- National Route 417
- National Route 476

== Local attractions ==
- Asuwagawa Dam
- Ryūsō Falls, one of "Japan’s Top 100 Waterfalls",
