= Sasogawa Dam =

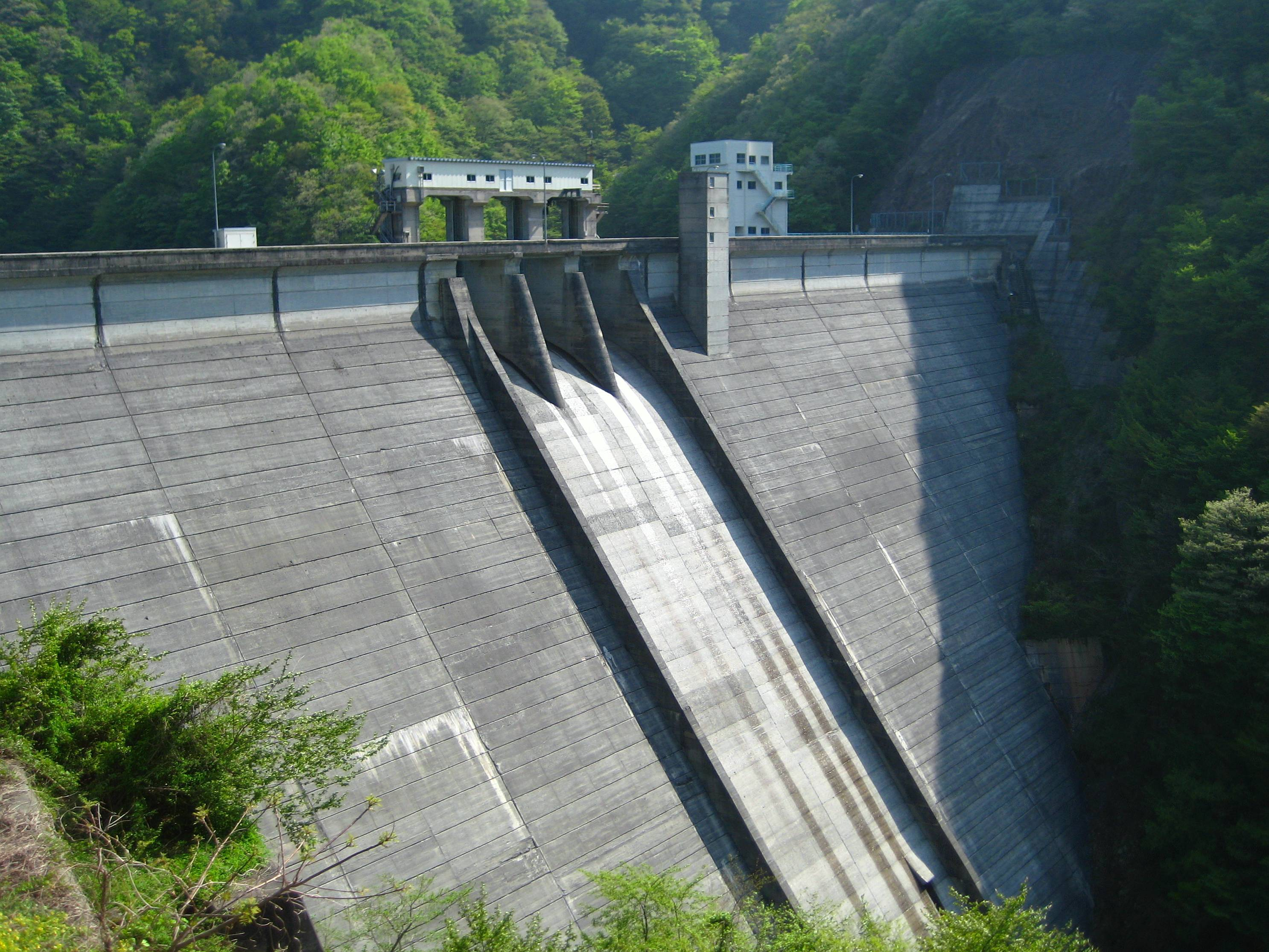

- Location within Fukui Prefecture Location within Japan
- Location: Ōno, Fukui Prefecture, Japan
- Coordinates: 35°50′35″N 136°32′48″E
- Purpose: multi-purpose
- Construction began: 1952
- Opening date: 1957

Dam and spillways
- Height: 76 m (249 ft)
- Length: 215 m (705 ft)

Reservoir
- Total capacity: 58,806,000 m^{3}
- Catchment area: 70.7 km^{2}
- Surface area: 234 hectares (580 acres)

Nakajima Power Station
- Installed capacity: 18,000kW

Sasogawa Dam (笹生川ダム, Sasogawa damu) is a multi-purpose dam located in the city of Ōno in Fukui Prefecture. Japan. The dam and its reservoir are located within Okuetsu Kōgen Prefectural Natural Park.

== Construction ==
Sasogawa Dam was built as part of the Managawa River Comprehensive Development Project, for the development of the Kuzuryū River basin in Fukui prefecture from 1950, for flood control, water for agriculture and also, to supply the cities of Fukui and Ōno with water and hydroelectric power generation. Construction on the dam began in 1952 and was completed in 1957. The dam is gravity type concrete dam with a height of 76.0 m.

== Failure and improvement ==
During torrential rains in 1965, the capacity of Sasogawa Dam was greatly overwhelmed, and considerable damage occurred to the dam and to downstream settlements. The Nakajima district, which was the center of the former Nishitani village downstream, was destroyed by the flood and was forced to relocate and abandon the village.

For this reason, Fukui Prefecture, which manages the dam, started a flood discharge improvement plan in 1972, and built a flood discharge tunnel on the right bank of the dam to deal with the Okuetsu heavy rain class flood. Due to these improvements, torrential rains in 2004 did not cause any further damage.

== Operator ==
The associated Nakajima Power Station was initially operated by Fukui Prefecture, but in 2010 was transferred to Hokuriku Electric Power Company.
