= Ryugahana Dam =

Dam in Fukui Prefecture, Japan

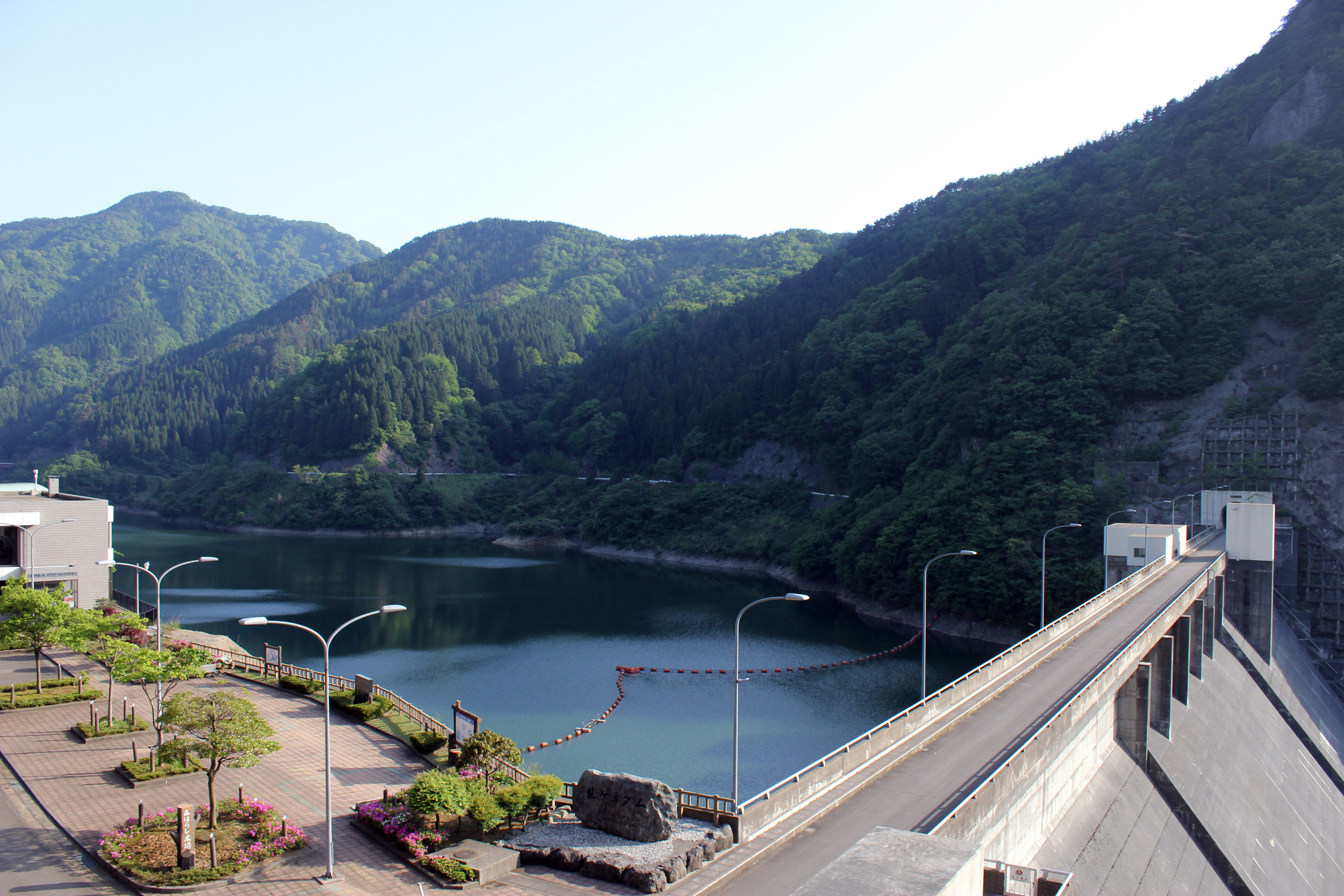

- Location within Japan
- Location: Fukui Prefecture, Japan
- Coordinates: 36°9′07″N 136°20′47″E
- Construction began: 1968
- Opening date: 1988

Dam and spillways
- Height: 79.5 m (261 ft)
- Length: 215 m (705 ft)

Reservoir
- Total capacity: 10,200,000 m^{3} (360,000,000 cu ft)
- Catchment area: 31.1 km^{2} (12.0 sq mi)
- Surface area: 38 hectares (94 acres)

Ryugahana Dam is a gravity dam located in Fukui Prefecture in Japan. The dam is used for flood control, water supply and power production. The catchment area of the dam is 31.1 km^{2}. The dam impounds about 38 ha of land when full and can store 10200 thousand cubic meters of water. The construction of the dam was started on 1968 and completed in 1988.
