= Busyu-ko Dam =

Dam in Fukui Prefecture, Japan

- Location within Japan
- Interactive map of Busyu-ko Dam
- Location: Fukui Prefecture, Japan
- Coordinates: 36°1′00″N 136°1′23″E
- Construction began: 1916
- Opening date: 1920

Dam and spillways
- Height: 20.3 m (67 ft)
- Length: 91.5 m (300 ft)

Reservoir
- Total capacity: 2261 thousand cubic meters
- Catchment area: 9 sq. km
- Surface area: 19 hectares

Busyu-ko Dam is an earthfill dam located in Fukui Prefecture in Japan. The dam is used for power production. The catchment area of the dam is 9 km^{2}. The dam impounds about 19 ha of land when full and can store 2261 thousand cubic meters of water. The construction of the dam was started on 1916 and completed in 1920.
