= Sogatani Dam =

Dam in Fukui Prefecture, Japan

- Location within Japan
- Location: Fukui Prefecture, Japan
- Coordinates: 35°53′11″N 136°2′01″E
- Construction began: 1975
- Opening date: 1980

Dam and spillways
- Height: 31.4 m (103 ft)
- Length: 113.5 m (372 ft)

Reservoir
- Total capacity: 230,000 m^{3} (8,100,000 cu ft)
- Catchment area: 1 km^{2} (0.39 sq mi)
- Surface area: 3 hectares (7.4 acres)

Sogatani Dam is an earthfill dam located in Fukui Prefecture in Japan. The dam is used for irrigation. The catchment area of the dam is 1 km^{2}. The dam impounds about 3 ha of land when full and can store 230 thousand cubic meters of water. The construction of the dam was started on 1975 and completed in 1980.
