= Kuzuryu Dam =

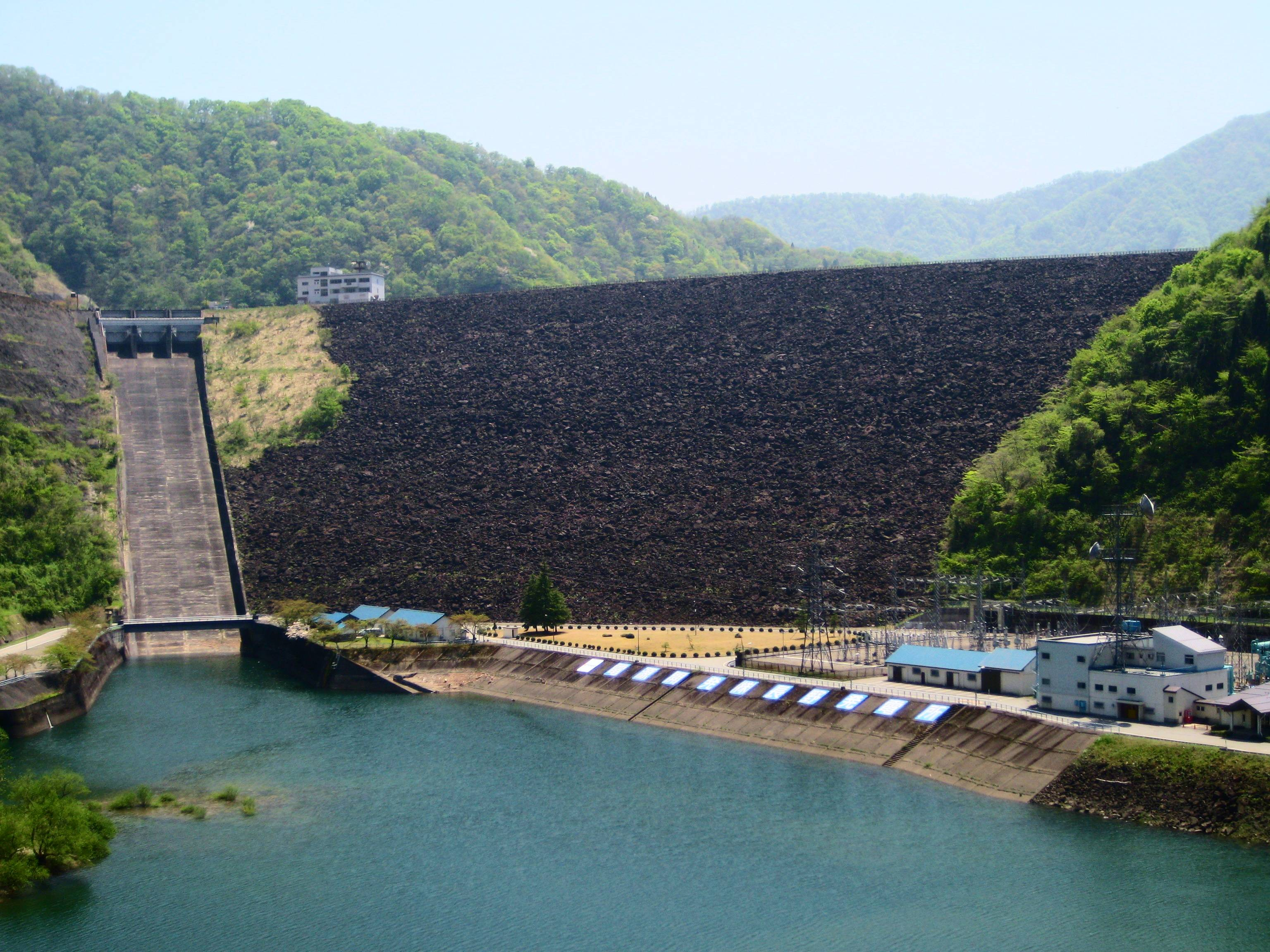
- Interactive map of Kuzuryu Dam
- Location: Ono, Fukui Prefecture, Japan
- Coordinates: 35°53′22″N 136°41′17″E
- Construction began: 1962
- Opening date: 1968

Dam and spillways
- Impounds: Kuzuryu River
- Height: 128 m
- Length: 355 m

Reservoir
- Total capacity: 353,000,000 m^{3}
- Catchment area: 184.5 km^{2}
- Surface area: 890 hectares

The Kuzuryu Dam (九頭竜ダム, Kuzuryū-damu) is a dam in the city of Ōno in the Fukui Prefecture of Japan. The dam supports a 220 MW hydroelectric power station.

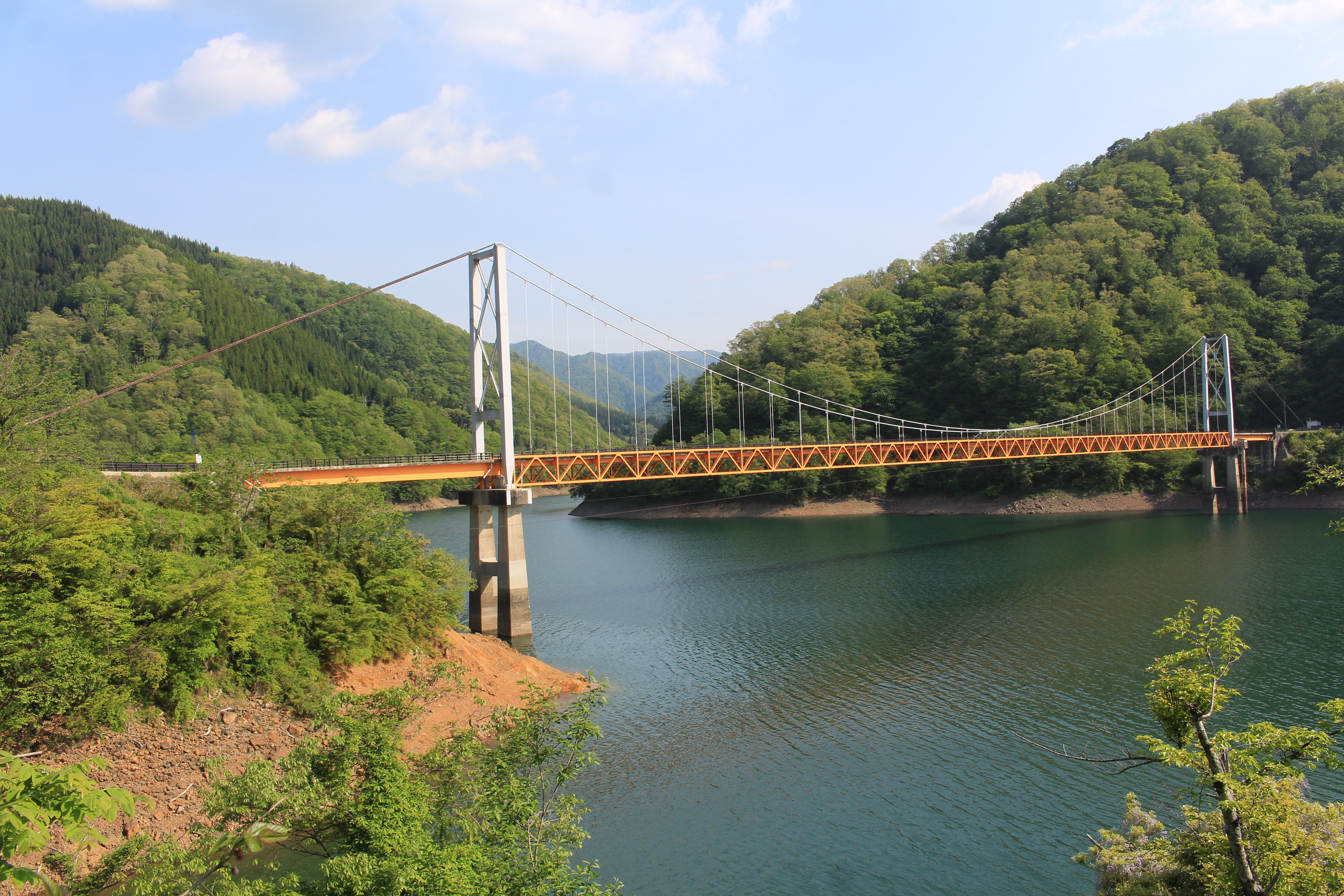
Hakogase Bridge

As a result of the series of developments, 530 private houses, 191 hectares of farmland, 868 hectares of forest and 81 km of roads in Izumi village were to be submerged.
