= Mount Kanmuri (Gifu, Fukui) =

Mountain in Japan

- 冠山
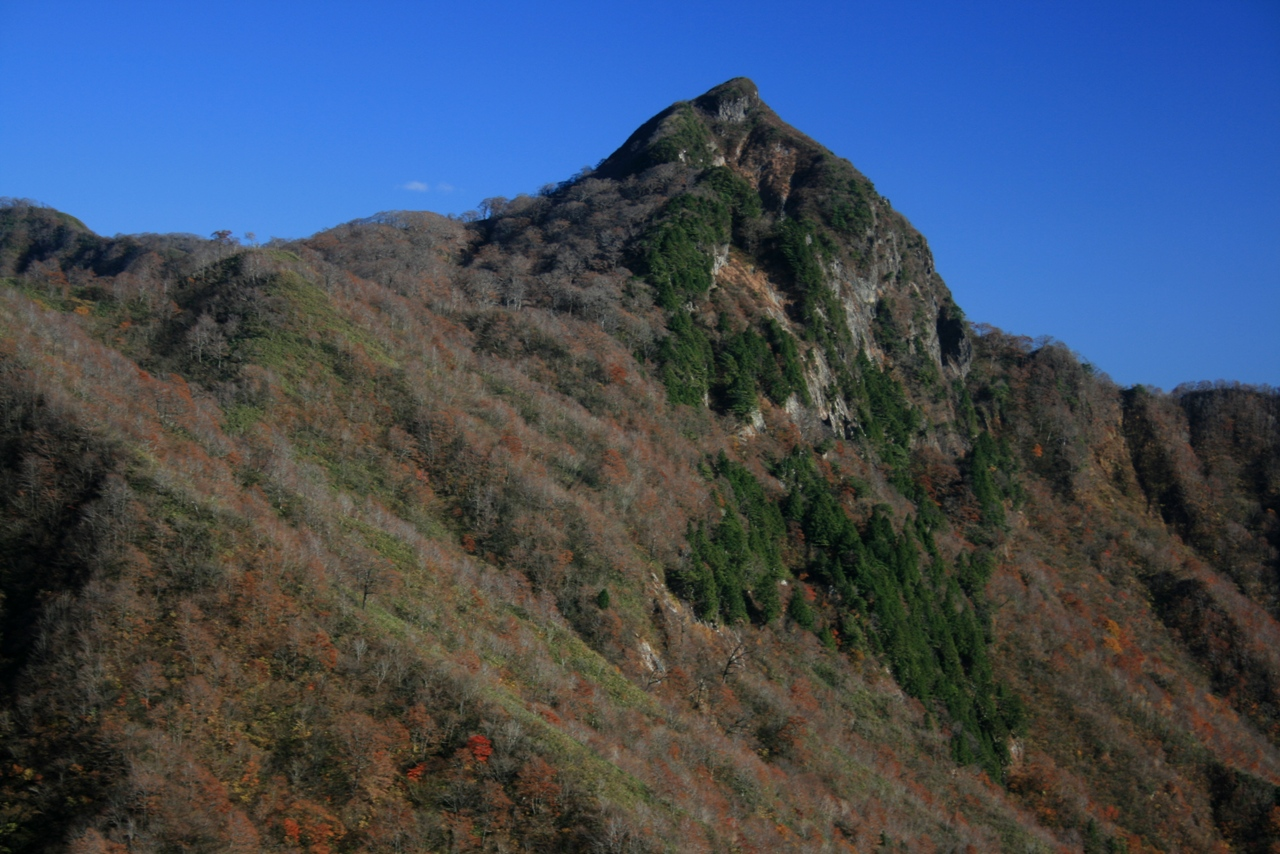

Highest point
- Elevation: 1,256.6 m (4,123 ft)
- Coordinates: 35°46′47″N 136°24′34″E

Geography
- Location within Japan
- Location: Ibigawa, Gifu Prefecture; Ikeda, Fukui Prefecture, Japan
- Parent range: Ryōhaku Mountains

Mount Kanmuri (冠山, Kanmuri-yama) is a mountain located on the border between Gifu and Fukui prefectures in the Chūbu region of Japan. It is 1,256.6 m (4,123 ft) tall and part of the Ryōhaku Mountains. It is also the source of the Ibi River.

The mountain peak has a small area that can only hold about 10 people, but it offers an unobstructed 360-degree panoramic view. There is also a triangulation station on the peak.

== Hiking ==
There is one prepared hiking trail on the mountain, and it takes about 2 hours to reach the peak. At the beginning of the trail, there are several steep climbs through an old growth forest. There is a fork in the path near the peak; the left fork leads to the Kanmuri Flats, while the right leads to the mountain peak.
