= Ohara Dam (Fukui) =

Dam in Fukui Prefecture, Japan

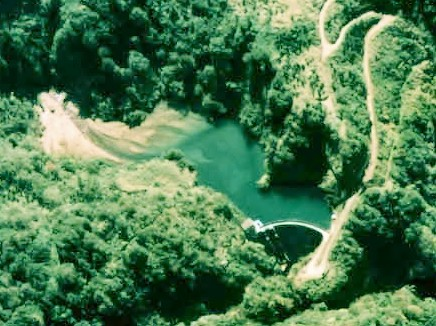

- Location within Japan
- Location: Fukui Prefecture, Japan
- Coordinates: 36°4′56″N 136°36′25″E
- Construction began: 1963
- Opening date: 1964

Dam and spillways
- Height: 35.5 m (116 ft)
- Length: 77.8 m (255 ft)

Reservoir
- Total capacity: 152,000 m^{3} (5,400,000 cu ft)
- Catchment area: 12.8 km^{2} (4.9 sq mi)
- Surface area: 2 hectares (4.9 acres)

Ohara Dam is a gravity dam located in Fukui Prefecture in Japan. The dam is used for power production. The catchment area of the dam is 12.8 km^{2}. The dam impounds about 2 ha of land when full and can store 152 thousand cubic meters of water. The construction of the dam was started on 1963 and completed in 1964.
