= Hotokebara Dam =

Dam in Fukui Prefecture, Japan

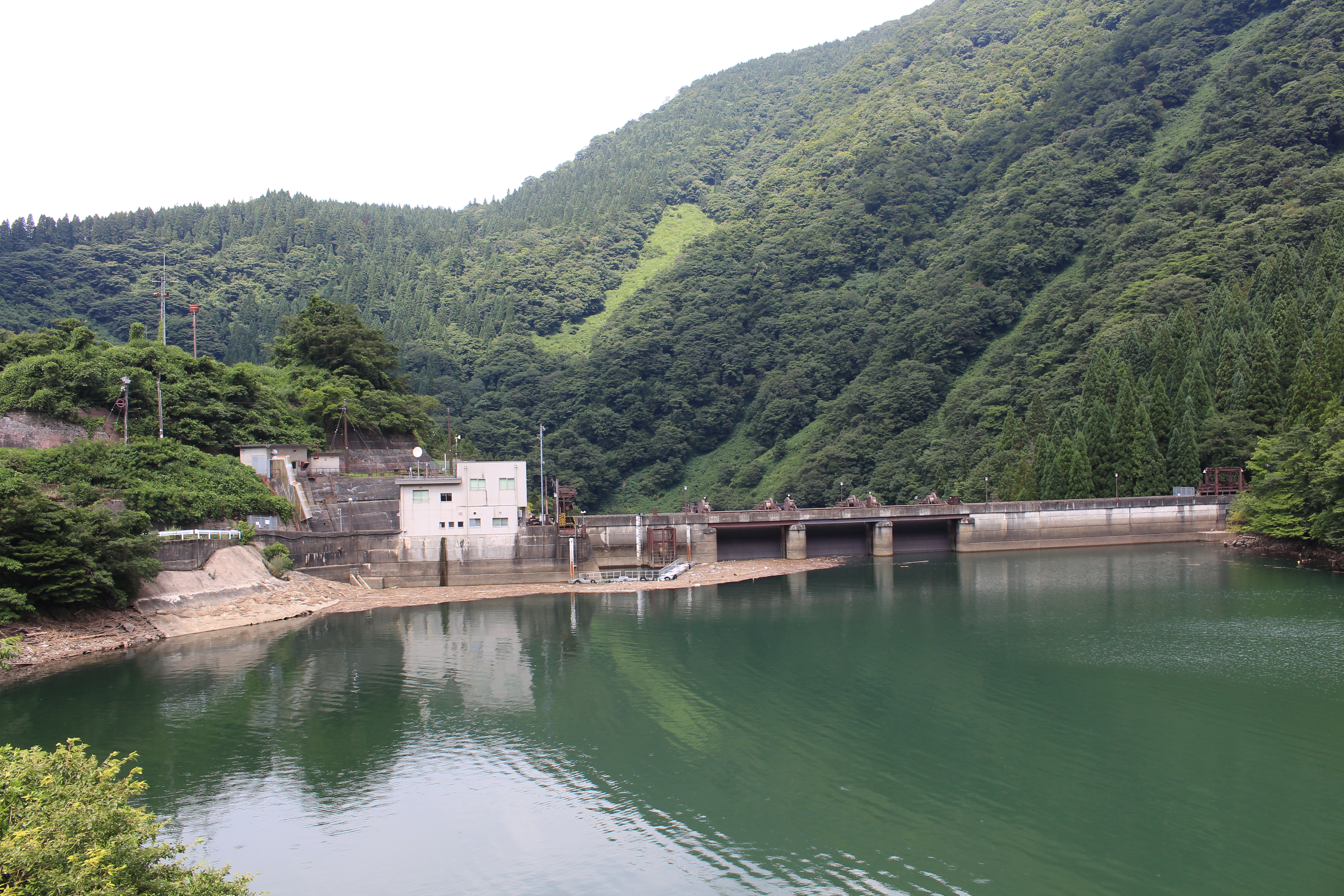

- Location within Japan
- Interactive map of Hotokebara Dam
- Location: Fukui Prefecture, Japan
- Coordinates: 35°57′17″N 136°37′23″E
- Construction began: 1965
- Opening date: 1968

Dam and spillways
- Height: 48.6 m (159 ft)
- Length: 141 m (463 ft)

Reservoir
- Total capacity: 3723 thousand cubic meters
- Catchment area: 437.9 sq. km
- Surface area: 29 hectares

Hotokebara Dam is a gravity dam located in Fukui Prefecture in Japan. The dam is used for power production. The catchment area of the dam is 437.9 km^{2}. The dam impounds about 29 ha of land when full and can store 3723 thousand cubic meters of water. The construction of the dam was started on 1965 and completed in 1968.
