= Kaitani Dam =

Dam in Fukui Prefecture, Japan

- Location within Japan
- Interactive map of Kaitani Dam
- Location: Fukui Prefecture, Japan
- Coordinates: 35°55′13″N 136°6′02″E
- Construction began: 1972
- Opening date: 1977

Dam and spillways
- Height: 24.5 m (80 ft)
- Length: 50 m (160 ft)

Reservoir
- Total capacity: 107 thousand cubic meters
- Catchment area: 1.1 sq. km
- Surface area: 2 hectares

Kaitani Dam is a rockfill dam located in Fukui Prefecture in Japan. The dam is used for flood control. The catchment area of the dam is 1.1 km^{2}. The dam impounds about 2 ha of land when full and can store 107 thousand cubic meters of water. The construction of the dam was started on 1972 and completed in 1977.
