= Kumokawa Dam =

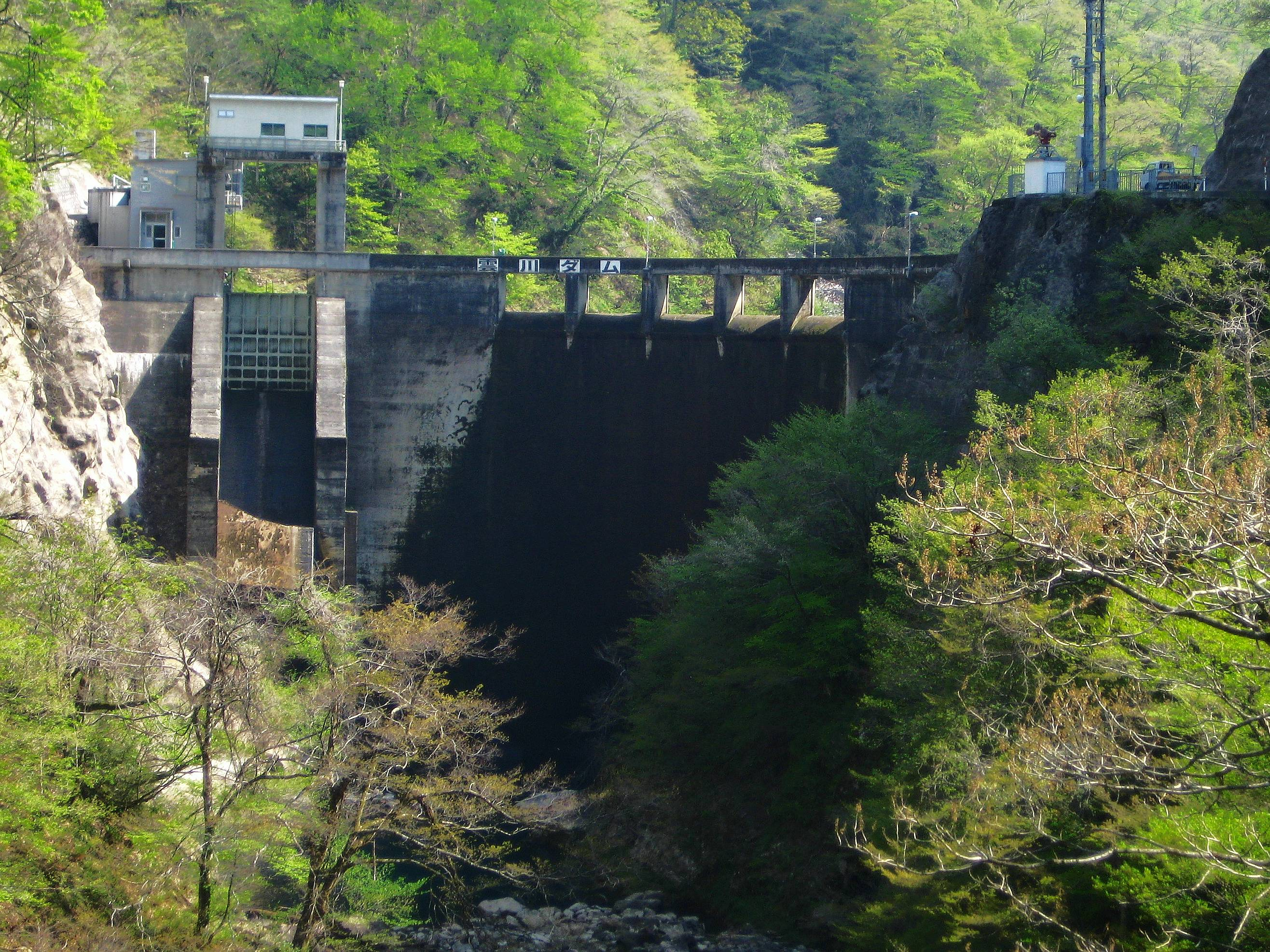
- Location: Ōno, Fukui Prefecture, Japan
- Construction began: 1952
- Opening date: 1957

Dam and spillways
- Height: 39 m (128 ft)
- Length: 95 m (312 ft)

Reservoir
- Total capacity: 1490 thousand m^{3}
- Catchment area: 58.8 km^{2}
- Surface area: 18 hectares

Kumokawa Dam (雲川ダム, Kumakawa-damu) is a multi-purpose dam located in the city of Ōno in Fukui Prefecture. Japan, completed in 1957.
