= Masutani Dam =

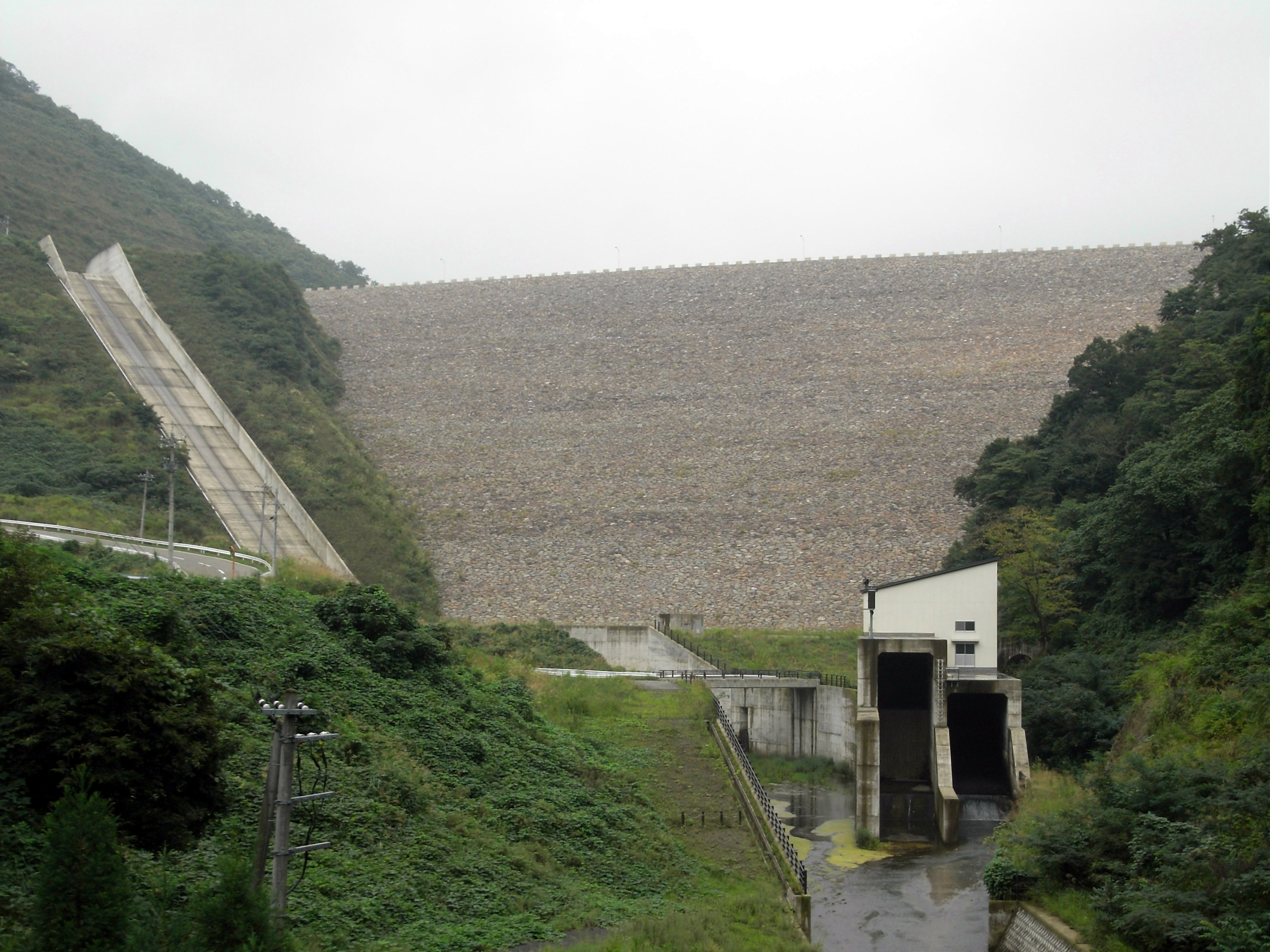

- Location within Fukui Prefecture Location within Japan
- Location: Minamiechizen, Fukui Prefecture, Japan
- Coordinates: 35°44′27″N 136°14′54″E
- Construction began: 1981
- Opening date: 2005

Dam and spillways
- Impounds: Masutanigawa River
- Height: 100.4 m (329 ft)
- Length: 344.8 m (1,131 ft)

Reservoir
- Total capacity: 24,200,000 m^{3}
- Catchment area: 10.2 km^{2}
- Surface area: 89 hectares

Masutani Dam (桝谷ダム, Masutani-damu) is a dam in the town of Minamiechizen, Fukui Prefecture, Japan.

Masutami Dam is a multipurpose dam aimed at irrigation, flood control on the Hino River, and to provide drinking and industrial water to the cities of Fukui and Sabae. The dam is a rockfill dam with a height 100.4 meters and was built by the Ministry of Agriculture, Forestry and Fisheries. The dam is currently managed by the Fukui prefectural government.

Construction work began in 1981 and was completed in 2005.
