= Ogurami Dam =

Dam in Fukui Prefecture, Japan

- Location within Japan
- Location: Fukui Prefecture, Japan
- Coordinates: 35°57′32″N 136°6′49″E
- Opening date: 1900

Dam and spillways
- Height: 15.3 m (50 ft)

Reservoir
- Total capacity: 60,000 m^{3} (2,100,000 cu ft)
- Catchment area: 0.2 km^{2} (0.077 sq mi)
- Surface area: hectares

Ogurami Dam is an earthfill dam located in Fukui Prefecture in Japan. The dam is used for irrigation. The catchment area of the dam is 0.2 km^{2}. The dam can store 60 thousand cubic meters of water. The construction of the dam was completed in 1900.
