= Jodojigawa Dam =

Dam in Fukui Prefecture, Japan

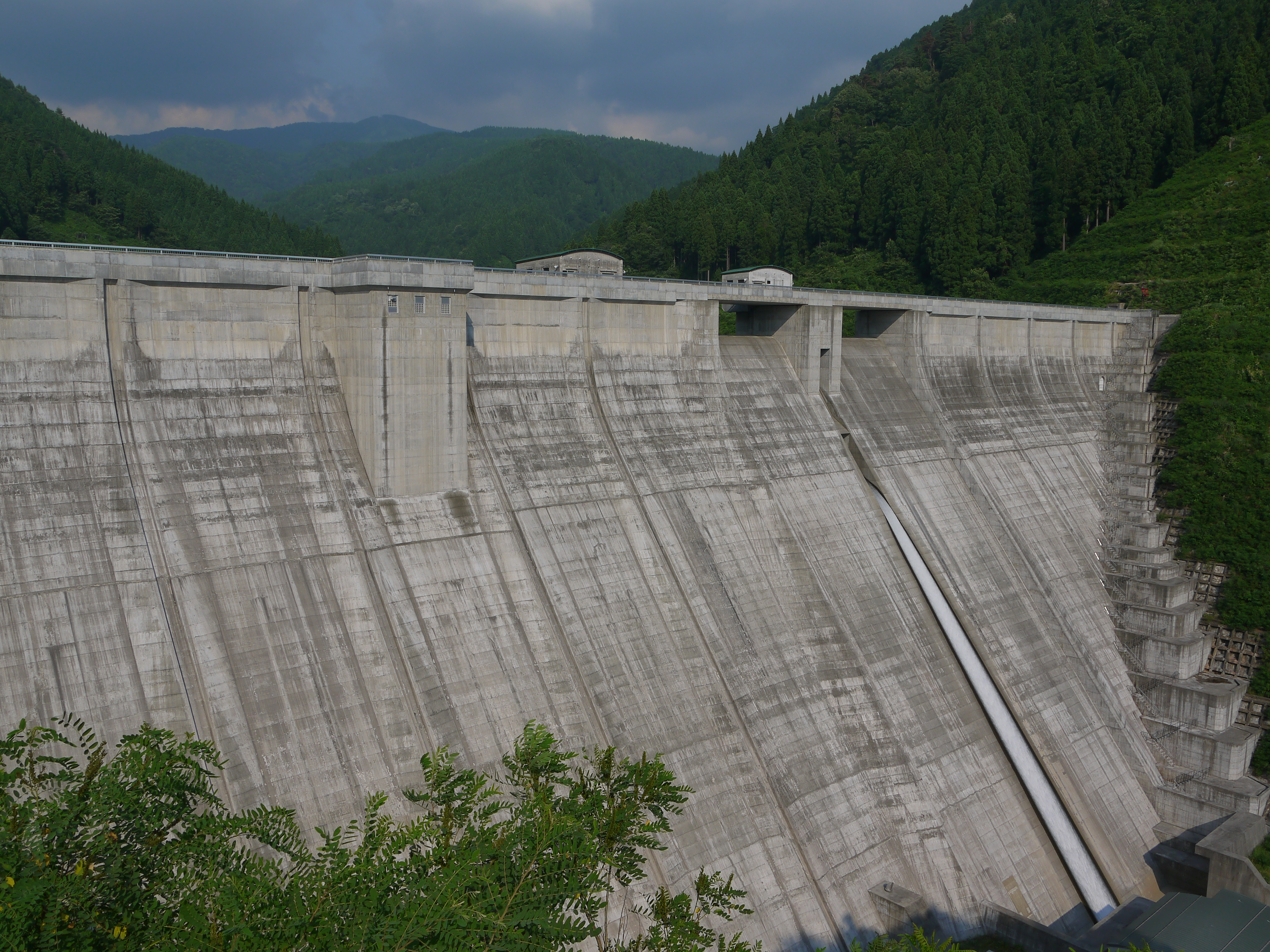

- Location within Japan
- Interactive map of Jodojigawa Dam
- Location: Fukui Prefecture, Japan
- Coordinates: 36°3′48″N 136°32′31″E
- Construction began: 1989
- Opening date: 2008

Dam and spillways
- Height: 72 m (236 ft)
- Length: 233 m (764 ft)

Reservoir
- Total capacity: 2160 thousand cubic meters
- Catchment area: 7.7 sq. km
- Surface area: 10 hectares

Jodojigawa Dam is a gravity dam located in Fukui Prefecture in Japan. The dam is used for flood control and water supply. The catchment area of the dam is 7.7 km^{2}. The dam impounds about 10 ha of land when full and can store 2160 thousand cubic meters of water. The construction of the dam was started on 1989 and completed in 2008.
