= Takinami Dam =

Dam in Fukui Prefecture, Japan

- Location within Japan
- Location: Fukui Prefecture, Japan
- Coordinates: 36°1′22″N 136°5′32″E
- Construction began: 1978
- Opening date: 1986

Dam and spillways
- Height: 30.3 m (99 ft)
- Length: 136.3 m (447 ft)

Reservoir
- Total capacity: 577,000 m^{3} (20,400,000 cu ft)
- Catchment area: 7.5 km^{2} (2.9 sq mi)
- Surface area: 9 hectares (22 acres)

Takinami Dam is a rockfill dam located in Fukui Prefecture in Japan. The dam is used for flood control. The catchment area of the dam is 7.5 km^{2}. The dam impounds about 9 ha of land when full and can store 577 thousand cubic meters of water. The construction of the dam was started on 1978 and completed in 1986.
