= Yoshinosegawa Dam =

Dam in Fukui Prefecture, Japan

- Location within Japan
- Official name: 吉野瀬川ダム (Japanese)
- Location: Fukui Prefecture, Japan
- Coordinates: 35°53′10″N 136°6′44″E
- Construction began: 1986

Dam and spillways
- Height: 58 m (190 ft)
- Length: 190 m (620 ft)

Reservoir
- Total capacity: 7,800,000 m^{3} (280,000,000 ft^{3})
- Catchment area: 24 km^{2} (9.3 mi^{2})
- Surface area: 51 ha (130 acres)

Yoshinosegawa Dam (吉野瀬川ダム, Yoshinosegawa Damu) is an under construction gravity dam located in Fukui Prefecture in Japan. The dam is used for flood control. The catchment area of the dam is 24 square kilometres (9.3 mi^{2}). The dam impounds about 51 hectares (130 acres) of land when full and can store 7,800,000 cubic metres (280,000,000 ft^{3}) of water. Construction of the dam began in 1986.
