= Ohtsuro Dam =

Dam in Fukui Prefecture, Japan

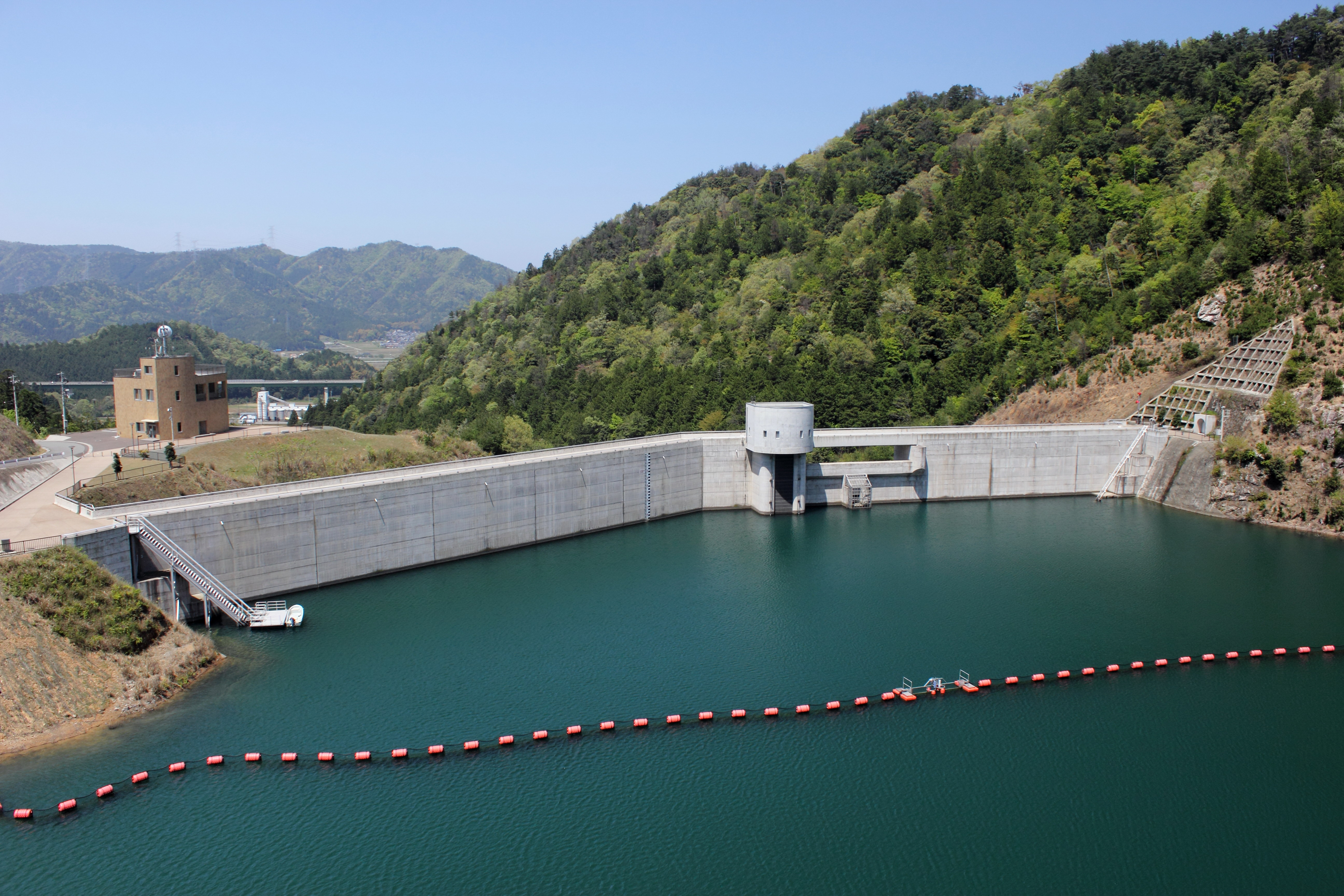

- Location within Japan
- Location: Fukui Prefecture, Japan
- Coordinates: 35°27′14″N 135°37′50″E
- Construction began: 1989
- Opening date: 2011

Dam and spillways
- Height: 40.6 m (133 ft)
- Length: 158.5 m (520 ft)

Reservoir
- Total capacity: 485,000 m^{3} (17,100,000 cu ft)
- Catchment area: 1.6 km^{2} (0.62 sq mi)
- Surface area: 3 hectares (7.4 acres)

Ohtsuro Dam is a gravity dam located in Fukui Prefecture in Japan. The dam is used for flood control and water supply. The catchment area of the dam is 1.6 km^{2}. The dam impounds about 3 ha of land when full and can store 485 thousand cubic meters of water. The construction of the dam was started on 1989 and completed in 2011.
