= Eiheiji Dam =

Dam in Fukui Prefecture, Japan

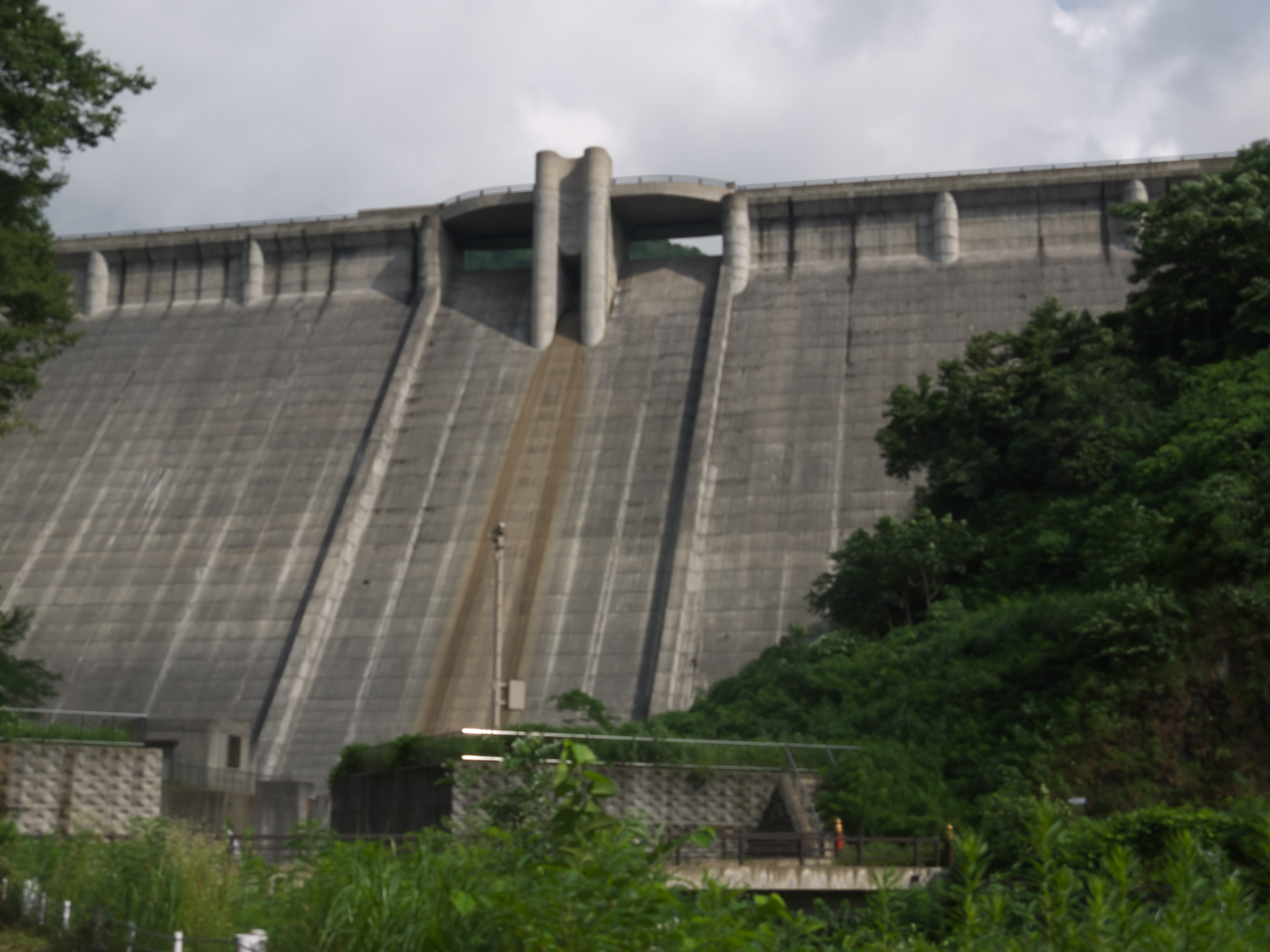

- Location within Japan
- Interactive map of Eiheiji Dam
- Location: Fukui Prefecture, Japan
- Coordinates: 36°2′57″N 136°21′43″E
- Construction began: 1991
- Opening date: 2001

Dam and spillways
- Height: 55 m (180 ft)
- Length: 177 m (581 ft)

Reservoir
- Total capacity: 770 thousand cubic meters
- Catchment area: 3.1 sq. km
- Surface area: 4 hectares

Eiheiji Dam is a gravity dam located in Fukui Prefecture in Japan. The dam is used for flood control and water supply. The catchment area of the dam is 3.1 km^{2}. The dam impounds about 4 ha of land when full and can store 770 thousand cubic meters of water. The construction of the dam was started on 1991 and completed in 2001.
