= Itoshiro Dam =

Coordinates: 35°56′52.4″N 136°43′38.9″E

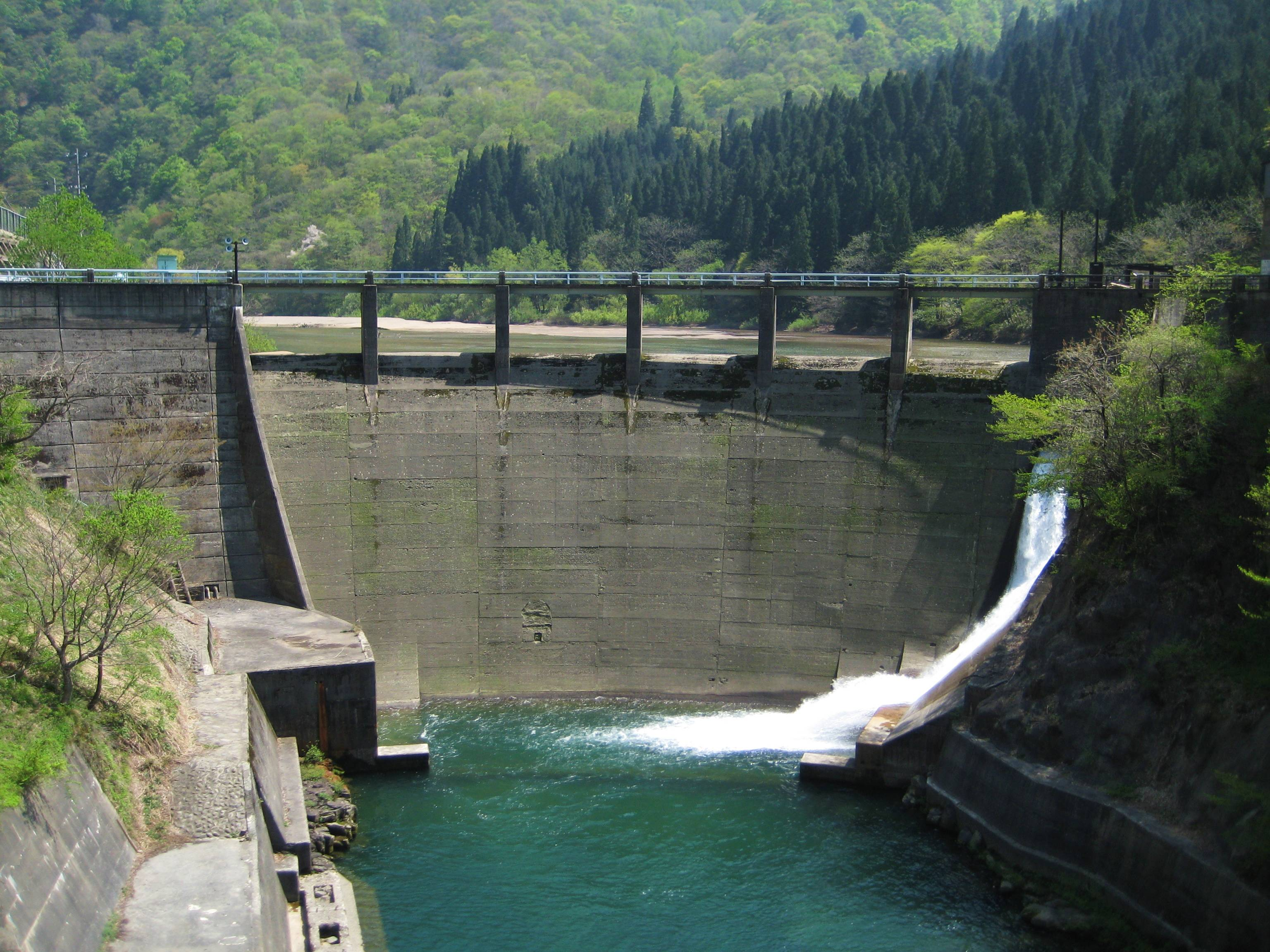
- Interactive map of Itoshiro Dam
- Location: Ono, Fukui Prefecture, Japan

Dam and spillways
- Impounds: Itoshiro River

The Itoshiro Dam is a dam in the city of Ono in Fukui Prefecture, Japan. It was completed in 1968.

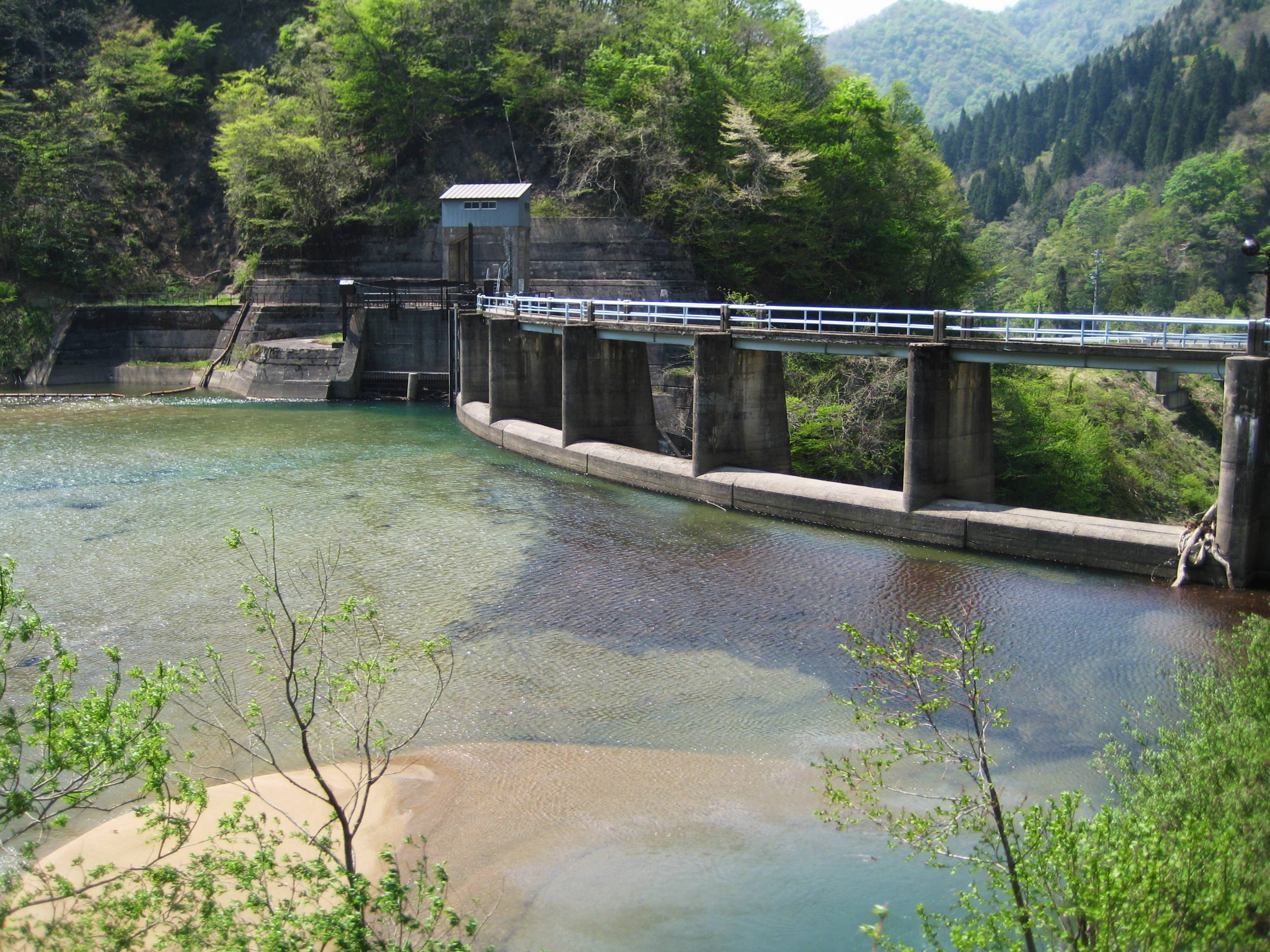
