= Kuzuryū River =

Coordinates: 36°13′09″N 136°08′04″E

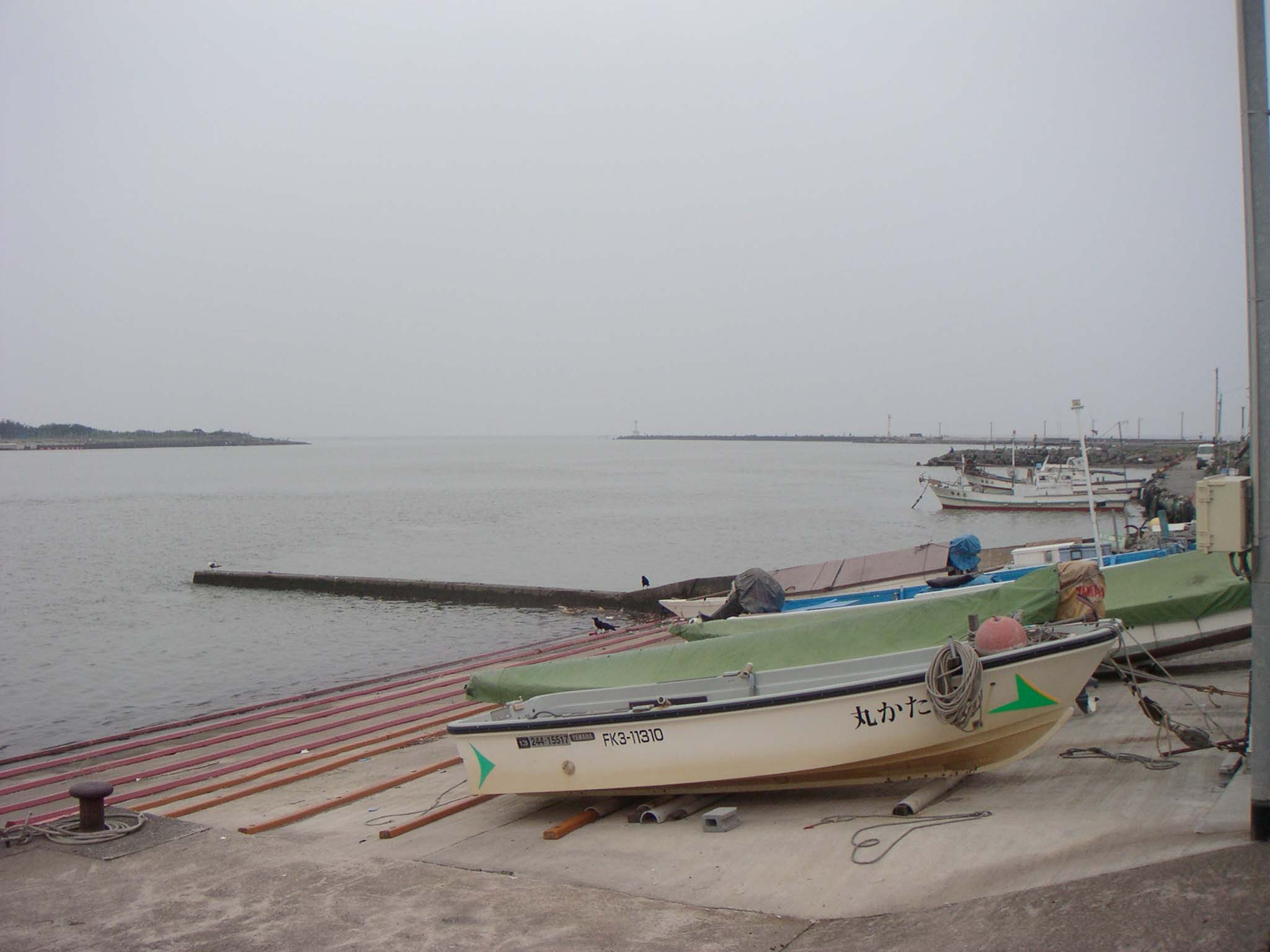
- Mouth of the Kuzuryū River

- Native name: 九頭竜川 (Japanese)

Location
- Country: Japan

Physical characteristics
- Source
  - location: Aburasaka Pass Ōno, Fukui
  - elevation: 717 m (2,352 ft)
- Mouth
  - location: Sea of Japan
  - elevation: 0 m (0 ft)
- Length: 116 km (72 mi)
- Basin size: 2,930 km^{2} (1,130 sq mi)
- Discharge
  - average: 86.4 m^{3}/s (3,050 cu ft/s)

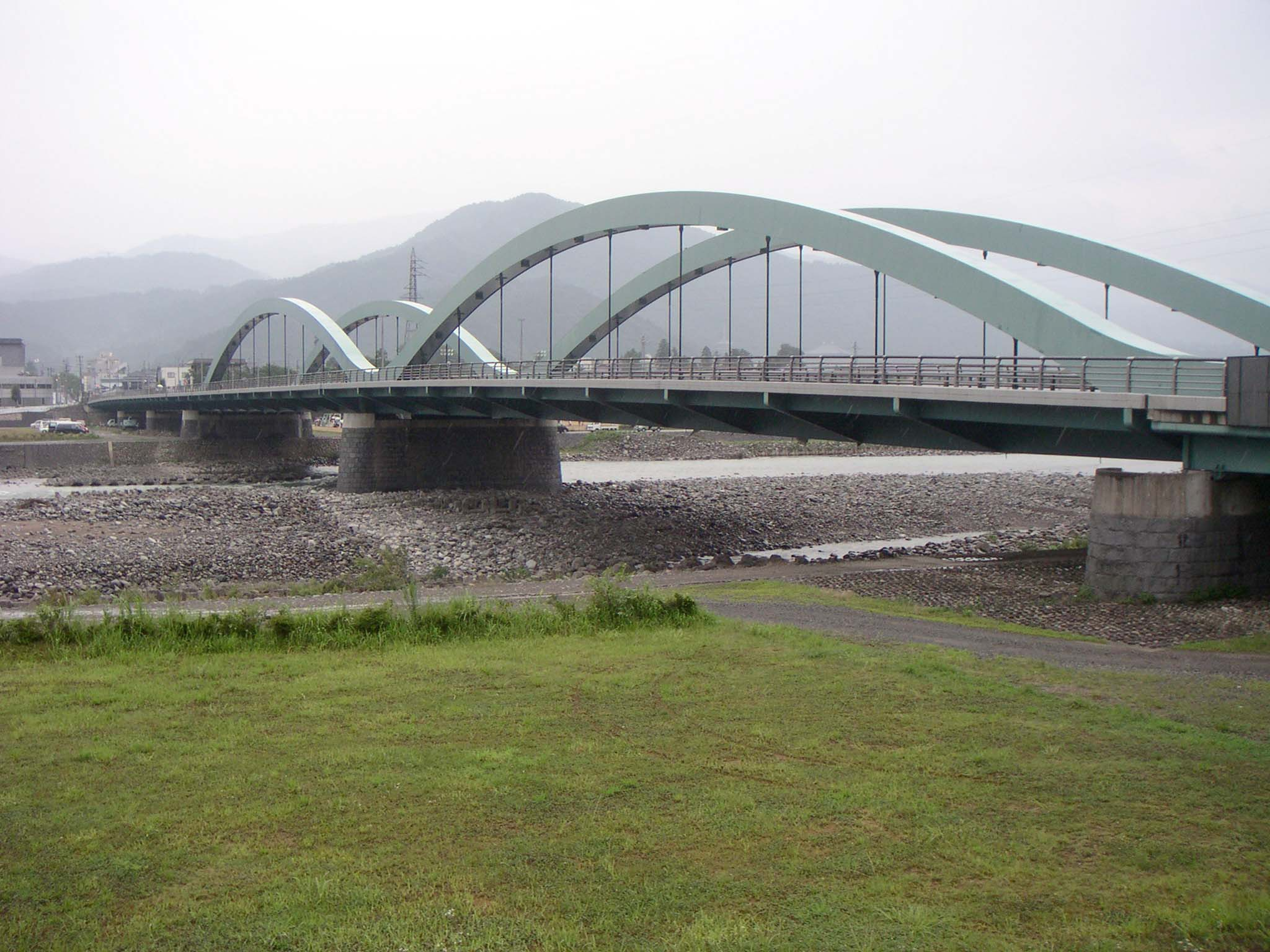
The Kuzuryū River flowing beneath Katsuyama Bridge in Fukui

The Kuzuryū River (九頭竜川, Kuzuryū-gawa) is a Class A river flowing through Fukui Prefecture, Japan. It has its source at the Aburasaka Pass (油坂峠 Aburasaka-tōge) in the city of Ōno and empties into the Sea of Japan near the city of Sakai.

== River system ==
Some of the main rivers that flow into the Kuzuryū River include: the Itoshiro River, the Hino River, the Asuwa River and the Takeda River.

== River communities ==
The river passes through or forms the boundary of the communities listed below.

Fukui Prefecture
Ōno, Katsuyama, Eiheiji, Fukui, Sakai
