= Ōno Domain =

Japanese feudal estate (1624–1871)

Ōno Domain 大野藩
- under Tokugawa shogunate Japan
- 1624–1633; 1635–1871
- Capital: Ōno Castle
- Area
  - Coordinates: 35°59′11.64″N 136°28′59.15″E
  - Type: Daimyō
- Historical era: Edo period
  - Established: 1624
  - Disestablished: 1871
- Today part of: part of Fukui Prefecture

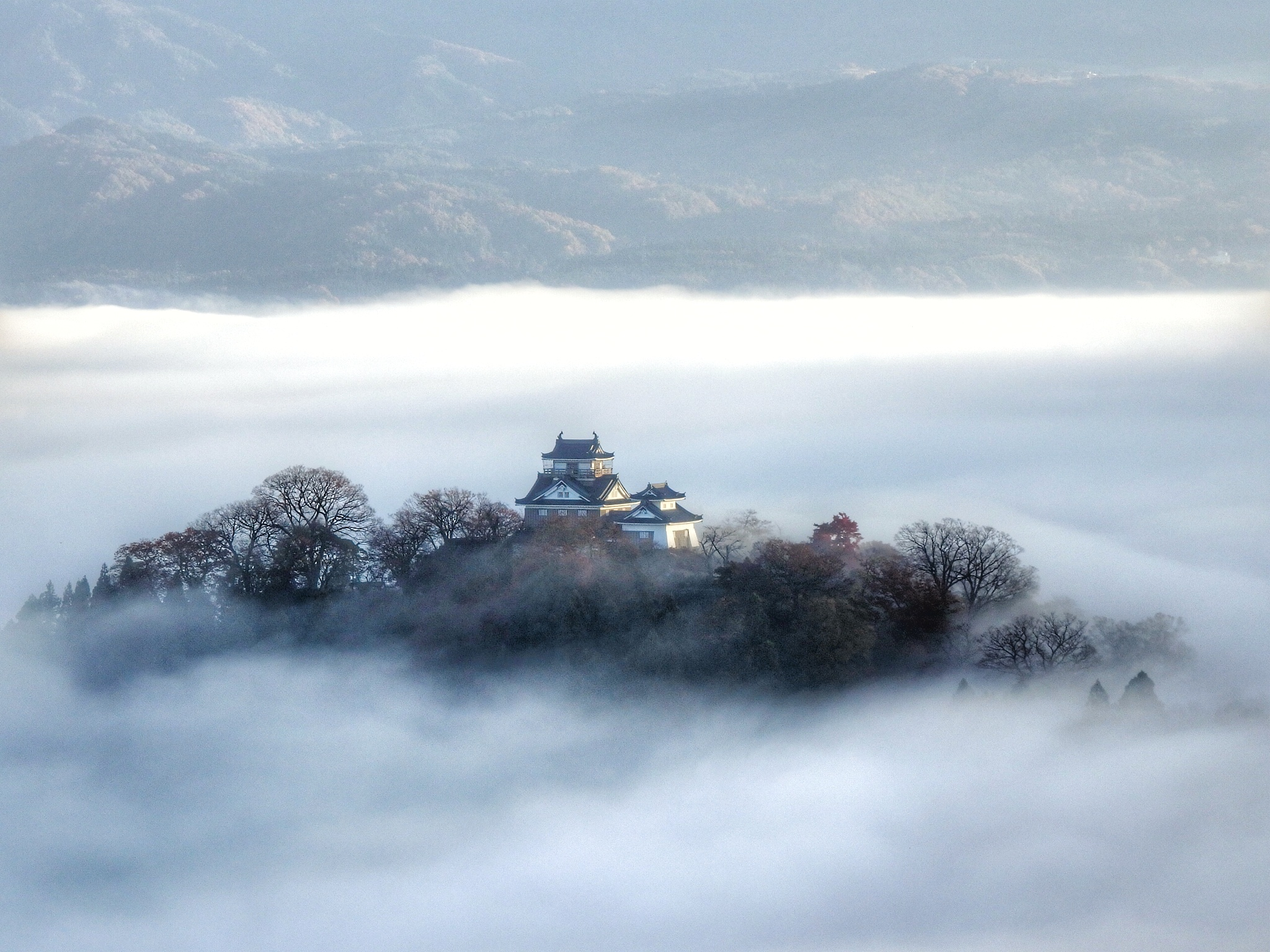
Ōno Castle

Ōno Domain (大野藩, Ōno han) was a feudal domain under the Tokugawa shogunate of Edo period Japan. It was based at Ōno Castle in Echizen Province in what is now the center of modern-day city of Ōno, Fukui.

== History ==
During the early Sengoku period, the area around Ōno was under the control of the Asakura clan; however Ōno was also a major stronghold of the Ikkō-ikki movement. After both the Asakura and the Ikkō-ikki were destroyed by Oda Nobunaga in 1575, he assigned the area to his general Kanamori Nagachika under the regional control of Shibata Katsuie. Kanamori began the construction of Ōno Castle using the latest contemporary designs, and the castle was completed by 1580.

Kanamori was subsequently promoted to governor of Hida Province in 1586, and the area was assigned by Toyotomi Hideyoshi to Aoki Kazunori followed by Oda Hidekatsu. After the Battle of Sekigahara, the entire province of Echizen was assigned by Tokugawa Ieyasu to his second son, Yūki Hideyasu in 1601 as Fukui Domain. In 1624, Fukui Domain was divided, with Yūki Hideyasu's third son, Matsudaira Naomasa being awarded a 55,000 koku fief centered at Ōno. This became Ōno Domain. Naomasa was transferred to Matsumoto Domain in 1633 and was replaced by his younger brother Matsudaira Naomoto in 1635. Naomoto was then transferred to Yamagata Domain in 1644, and was replaced by his younger brother, Matsudaira Naoyoshi. Naoyoshi's son Matsudaira Naoakira was in turn transferred to Himeji Domain in 1682.

The domain was then assigned to a cadet branch of the Doi clan under Doi Toshifusa. The Doi clan would rule Ōno for the next eight generations until the Meiji restoration. Throughout its history, Ōno suffered from severe financial problems; however, Doi Toshitada (1811-1869) implemented substantial reforms and introduced rangaku and western technology. Although a small domain, Ōno was noted in the Bakumatsu period for its westernised army and its han school.

== Holdings at the end of the Edo period ==
Like most domains in the han system, Ōno Domain consisted of several discontinuous territories calculated to provide the assigned kokudaka, based on periodic cadastral surveys and projected agricultural yields, At the time of the ending of the Tokugawa shogunate, the domain also had four trading posts in central Karafuto.

- Echizen Province
  - 85 villages in Ōno District
  - 13 villages in Nyū District
  - 4 villages in Karafuto

== List of daimyō ==
| # | Name | Tenure | Courtesy title | Court Rank | kokudaka |
|---|---|---|---|---|---|
Matsudaira clan (shinpan) 1624–1633
| 1 | Matsudaira Naomasa (松平直政) | 1624-1633 | Dewa-no-kami (出羽守); Jijū (侍従) | Junior 4th Rank, Lower Grade (従四位下) | 50,000 koku |
Matsudaira clan (shinpan) 1635–1644
| 1 | Matsudaira Naomoto (松平直基) | 1635-1644 | Yamato-no-kami (大和守); Jijū (侍従) | Junior 4th Rank, Lower Grade (従四位下) | 50,000 koku |
Matsudaira clan (shinpan) 1644-1682
| 1 | Matsudaira Naoyoshi (松平直良) | 1644-1678 | Tosa-no-kami (出羽守); Jijū (侍従) | Junior 4th Rank, Lower Grade (従四位下) | 35,000 koku |
| 2 | Matsudaira Naoakira (松平直明) | 1678-1682 | Wakasa-no-kami (若狭守) | Junior 4th Rank, Lower Grade (従四位下) | 35,000 koku |
Doi clan (fudai) 1682–1871
| 1 | Doi Toshifusa (土井利房) | 1682-1683 | Noto-no-kami (能登守); Jijū (侍従) | Junior 4th Rank, Lower Grade (従四位下) | 40,000 koku |
| 2 | Doi Toshitomo (土井利知) | 1683-1743 | Kai-no-kami (甲斐守) | Junior 5th Rank, Lower Grade (従五位下) | 40,000 koku |
| 3 | Doi Toshihiro (土井利寛) | 1743-1746 | Iga-no-kami (伊賀守) | Junior 5th Rank, Lower Grade (従五位下) | 40,000 koku |
| 4 | Doi Toshisada (土井利貞) | 1746-1805 | Noto-no-kami (能登守) | Junior 5th Rank, Lower Grade (従五位下) | 40,000 koku |
| 5 | Doi Toshinori (土井利義) | 1805-1810 | Miki-no-kami (造酒正) | Junior 5th Rank, Lower Grade (従五位下) | 40,000 koku |
| 6 | Doi Toshikata (土井利器) | 1810-1818 | Kai-no-kami (甲斐守) | Junior 5th Rank, Lower Grade (従五位下) | 40,000 koku |
| 7 | Doi Toshitada (土井利忠) | 1818-1862 | Noto-no-kami (能登正) | Junior 5th Rank, Lower Grade (従五位下) | 40,000 koku |
| 8 | Doi Toshitsune (土井利恒) | 1862-1871 | Noto-no-kami (能登正) | Junior 5th Rank, Lower Grade (従五位下) | 40,000 koku |

=== Doi Toshifusa ===
Doi Toshifusa (土井利房; 1633 – July 19, 1683) was the 1st Doi daimyō of Ōno Domain in Echizen Province under the Edo period Tokugawa shogunate. Toshifusa was the fourth son of the tairō Doi Toshikatsu. In 1644, at the age of 13, his father ordered that he establish a cadet branch of the clan and assigned him a fief of 10,000 koku. He was granted the courtesy title of Noto-no-kami and court rank of Junior 5th Rank, Lower Grade in 1646. His revenues were doubled to 20,000 koku in 1658. In 1661, he served as a sōshaban and is 1663 as a wakadoshiyori. He received an additional 5,000 koku in 1670. From 1679 to 1681, he was appointed a rōjū under Shōgun Tokugawa Ietsuna, and received an additional 15,000 koku, bringing his estate to a total of 40,000 koku. His court rank was also increased to Junior 5th Rank, Lower Grade and he gained the additional courtesy title of jijū. In 1682, he became daimyō of Ōno Domain. His wife was a daughter of Tsugaru Nobuyoshi of Hirosaki Domain. He died in 1683.

=== Doi Toshitomo ===
Doi Toshitomo (土井利知; May 23, 1674 – March 19, 1745) was the 2nd Doi daimyō of Ōno Domain. Toshitomo was the eldest son of Doi Toshifusa and therefore the grandson of the tairō Doi Toshikatsu. He was born at the domain's residence in Kandabashi, Edo. Although the eldest son, he was born to a concubine and was raised by a retainer after the birth of his younger brother Toshiyoshi to Toshifusa's official wife; however, on his father's death in 1683, he inherited the title of daimyō. He underwent the genpuku ceremony in 1688 and received the courtesy title of Kai-no-kami and court rank of Junior 5th Rank, Lower Grade. When Honda Shigemasu of Maruoka Domain was dispossessed by the shogunate in 1695, he was assigned to oversee the transfer, and in 1696 he was appointed to the post of Osaka Kaban. These assignments placed a severe strain on the domain's finances, and fearing a peasant revolt, he was forced to apply for a reduction in then domain's taxes in 1697. In 1722, he served as a sōshaban, but during the same year, the domain's Edo residence burned down, once again creating a financial crisis. In 1730, he was able to clear the domain's debts by issuing paper money. In 1741, citing illness, he resigned as sōshaban and in 1743, he turned the domain over to his son and took the tonsure. He died at Ōno Castle in 1745. His wife was a daughter of Inaba Masanori of Odawara Domain.

=== Doi Toshihiro ===
Doi Toshihiro (土井利寛; October 17, 1718 – September 30, 1746) was the 3rd Doi daimyō of Ōno Domain. Toshihiro was the eldest son of Doi Toshitomo and was born at the domain's residence in Mejirodai, Edo. His courtesy title was Iga-no-kami and court rank was Junior 5th Rank, Lower Grade. He became daimyō on the retirement of his father in 1743. During his short tenure, he codified many of the laws and regulations of the domain. He died in Edo in 1746 at the young age of 29. His wife was a daughter of Sengoku Masafusa of Izushi Domain.

=== Doi Toshisada ===
Doi Toshisada (土井利貞; November 11, 1741 – December 3, 1807) was the 4th Doi daimyō of Ōno Domain. Toshisada was the eldest son of Doi Toshihiro and was born to a concubine at the domain's residence in Sugikaibashi, Edo. His courtesy title was Noto-no-kami and court rank was Junior 5th Rank, Lower Grade. He became daimyō on the death of his father in 1745; however, due to his age, domain affairs were managed by senior retainers during his minority. He was appointed Osaka kaban in 1759; however, through the remaining years of his tenure, the domain suffered from fires, repeated crop failures and continuing financial crisis, cumulated in a peasant revolt from 1787 to 1789. He retired in favour of his adopted son in 1805, and died at the domain's Meijirodai residence in 1807. His wife was a daughter of Sakai Tadazumi of Himeji Domain.

=== Doi Toshinori ===
Doi Toshinori (土井利義; July 31, 1777 – July 6, 1810) was the 5th Doi daimyō of Ōno Domain. Toshinori was born in Hikone as the tenth son of Ii Naohide of Hikone Domain. In 1791, he married Matsu, the fourth daughter of Doi Toshisada and was adopted as heir. His courtesy title was Ukyo-no-suke, later Nakatsukasa-no-shoyu, and his court rank was Junior 5th Rank, Lower Grade. In 1797, Matsu died and he remarried to the daughter of Okabe Nagatomo of Kishiwada Domain. He became daimyō on the retirement of Doi Toshisada in 1805. In 1808, he was granted the courtesy title of Kai-no-kami and in 1809, the title of Miki-no-kami. He died in 1818 at the domain's Mejirodai residence.

=== Doi Toshikata ===
Doi Toshikata (土井利器; July 3, 1783 – June 20, 1818) was the 6th Doi daimyō of Ōno Domain. Toshikata was born in Edo as the eleventh son of Kuze Hiroyasu of Sekiyado Domain. In 1809, he married Toshi, the daughter of Doi Toshinori and was adopted as heir He became daimyō in 1810 on Toshinori's retirement. His courtesy title was Kai-no-kami, and his court rank was Junior 5th Rank, Lower Grade. In 1812, he was appointed Osaka Kaban, and like his predecessors, found that this was a severe strain on the domain's finances. However, he did not take any action, preferring to let his retainers worry about such issues. He died in 1818 at Ōno Castle without male heir.

=== Doi Toshitada ===
Doi Toshitada (土井利忠; May 24, 1811 – January 15, 1869) was the 7th Doi daimyō of Ōno Domain. He was noted for reforming the domain by establishing a han school based on rangaku teachings and structuring the domain's military along western lines. He also reformed the domain's legal codes and finances, and established a network of stores throughout central Japan for trading goods and lending money. Although the domain was landlocked, he also purchased ships and was a major force in the Edo period development of Karafuto (Sakhalin).

=== Doi Toshitsune ===
Doi Toshitsune (土井利恒; August 17, 1846 – March 29, 1893) was the 8th (and final) Doi daimyō of Ōno Domain. Toshitsune was the third son of Toshitada and was born in Ōno. His wife was a daughter of Doi Toshinori of Koga Domain. He accompanied his father to Edo in 1862, and became daimyō later the same year. In 1863, he accompanied Shōgun Tokugawa Ieshige to Kyoto. In 1864, the domain used a scorched earth strategy to keep the forces of the Mito Rebellion from crossing into its territory, burning down hundreds of houses and farms near its border, and thus creating much resentment by the local inhabitants. In 1865, with the start of the Boshin War, the domain quickly defeated to the Imperial side, and sent its forces to participate in the Battle of Hakodate. In 1869, Toshitsune was appointed imperial governor until the abolition of the han system in 1871. In 1884, he was awarded the title of shishaku (viscount) in the new kazoku peerage.

== See also ==
- List of Han
