= Ōno Castle =

Ōno Castle may refer to:

- Ōno Castle (Chikuzen Province), a ruined castle in Fukuoka Prefecture, Japan
- Ōno Castle (Chita District, Owari Province), a castle in Aichi Prefecture, Japan
- Ōno Castle (Echizen Province), a castle in Fukui Prefecture, Japan
