= Ōno Castle (Echizen Province) =

Castle in Japan (1580–1871)

- 大野城
- Ōno, Fukui Prefecture, Japan
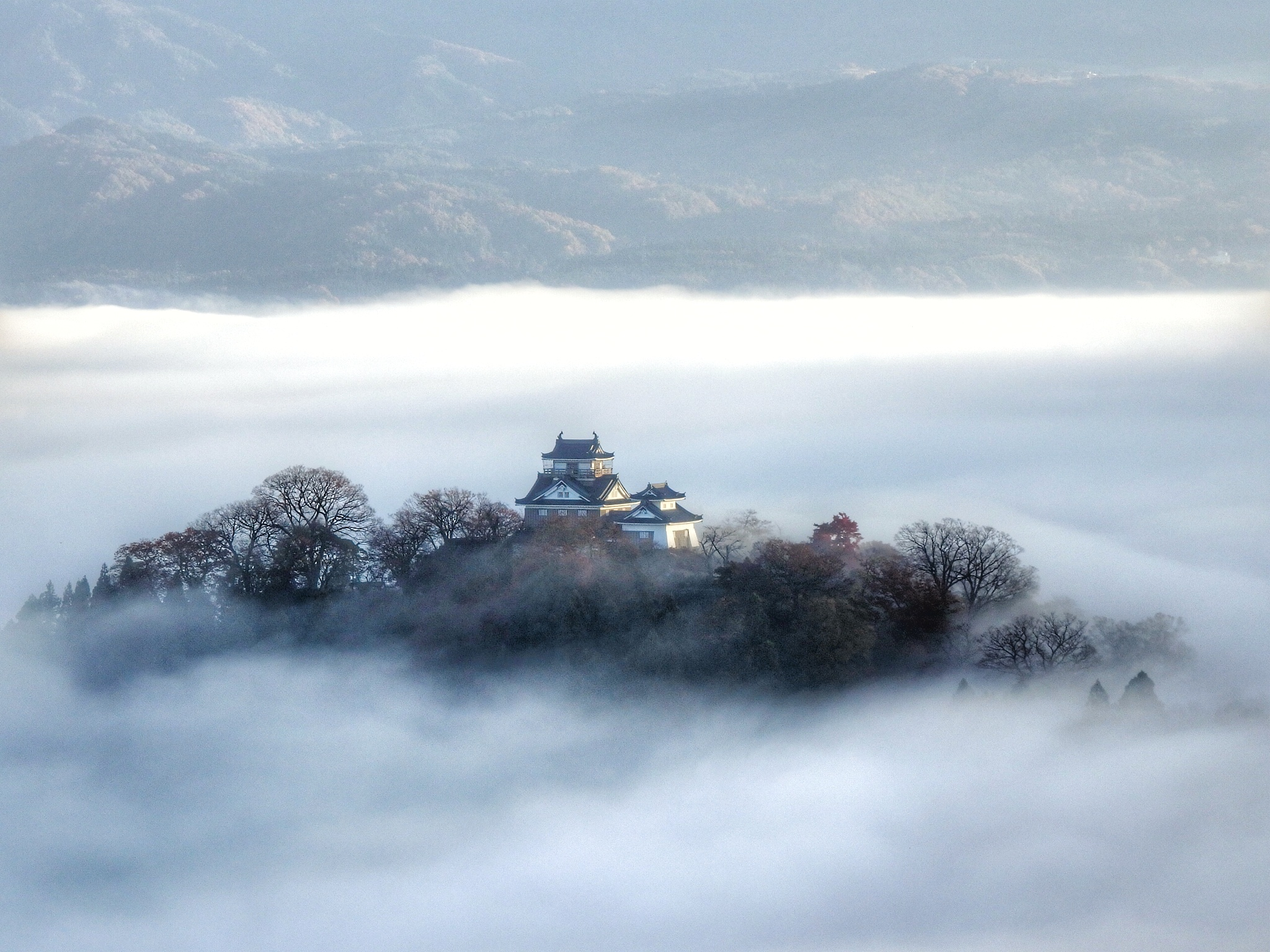
- reconstructed donjon of Ōno Castle

Site information
- Type: Japanese castle
- Open to the public: yes
- Condition: partly reconstructed

Location
- Location within Fukui Prefecture Location within Japan
- Coordinates: 35°59′11.64″N 136°28′59.15″E

Site history
- Built: 1580
- Built by: Kanamori Nagachika
- In use: Sengoku-Edo period
- Demolished: 1871

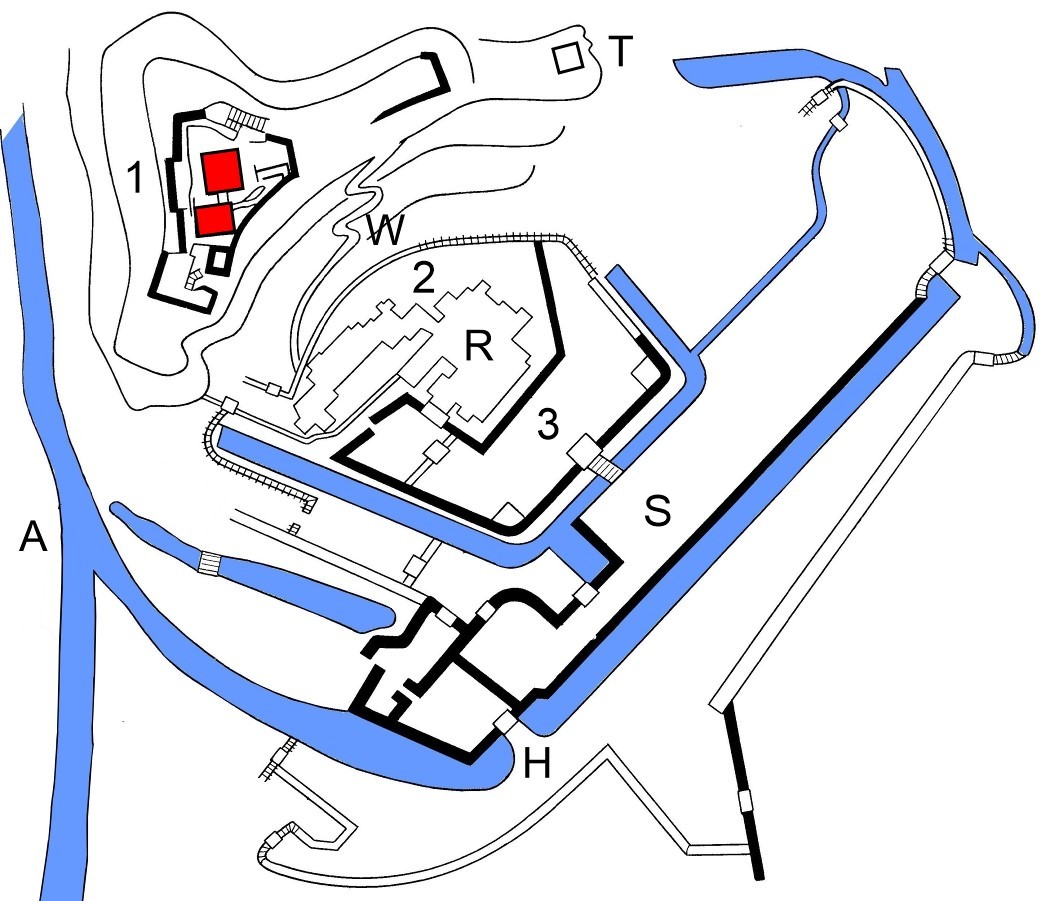
Layout of Ōno Castle

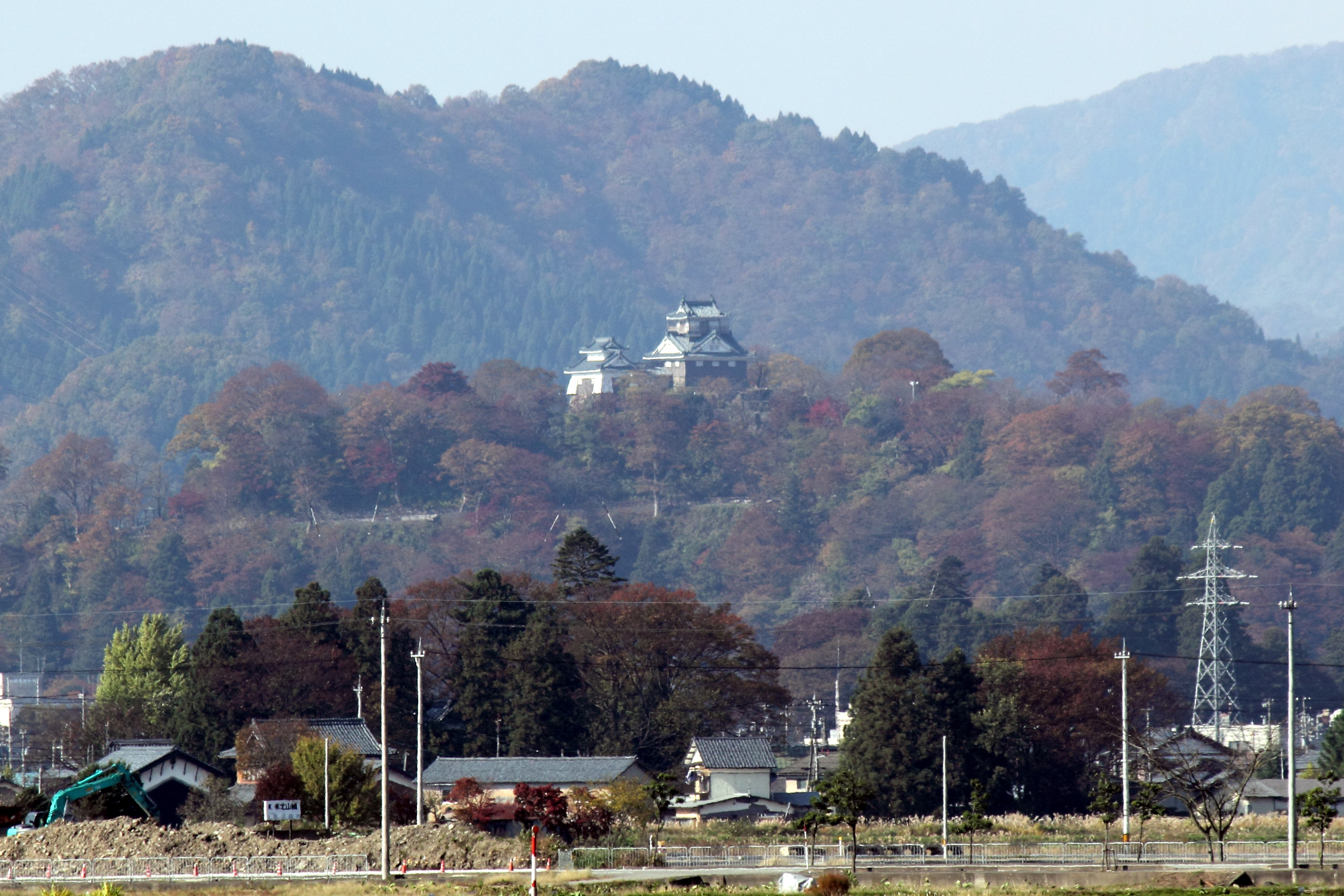
Ōno Castle from a distance

Ōno Castle (大野城, Ōno-jō) was a Japanese castle located in the city of Ōno, Fukui Prefecture, in the Hokuriku region of Japan. Built in the Sengoku period, it was occupied by a succession of daimyō of Ōno Domain under the Edo period Tokugawa shogunate.

== Background ==
Ōno Castle is located in northeastern Echizen Province on the main highway connecting Echizen with Mino Province. The castle is sited on the ridgeline of Kameyama Hill, extending east-to-west for approximately 300 meters. The inner bailey is located at the peak of the hill and is reinforced by stone ramparts made of mostly unmodified natural boulders. Secondary enclosures were located at lower levels and were also protected by water moats.

== History ==
During the early Sengoku period, the area around Ōno was under the control of the Asakura clan; however Ōno was also a major stronghold of the Ikkō-ikki movement. After both the Asakura and the Ikkō-ikki were destroyed by Oda Nobunaga in 1575, he assigned the area to his general Kanamori Nagachika under the regional control of Shibata Katsuie. Kanamori began the construction of Ōno Castle using the latest contemporary designs, and the castle was completed by 1580.

Kanamori was subsequently promoted to governor of Hida Province in 1586, and the area was assigned to Aoki Kazunori followed by Oda Hidekatsu by Toyotomi Hideyoshi. After the Battle of Sekigahara, the entire province of Echizen was assigned by Tokugawa Ieyasu to his second son, Yūki Hideyasu in 1601 as Fukui Domain. In 1624, Fukui Domain was divided, with Yūki Hideyasu's third son, Matsudaira Naomasa being awarded a 55,000 koku fief centered at Ōno. This became Ōno Domain. Naomasa was transferred to Matsumoto Domain in 1633 and was replaced by his younger brother Matsudaira Naomoto in 1635. Naomoto was then transferred to Yamagata Domain in 1644, and was replaced by his younger brother, Matsudaira Naoyoshi. Naoyoshi's son Matsudaira Naoakira was in turn transferred to Himeji Domain in 1682.

The domain was then assigned to a cadet branch of the Doi clan under Doi Toshifusa. The Doi clan would rule Ōno for the next eight generations until the Meiji restoration. The castle burned down in 1775, but with the exception of the donjon was reconstructed by 1795. Throughout its history, Ōno suffered from severe financial problems; however, Doi Toshitada (1811–1869) implemented substantial reforms and introduced rangaku and western technology. Although a small domain, Ōno was noted in the Bakumatsu period for its westernised army and its han school.

Following the Meiji restoration, the castle was pulled down, with the exception of a couple of gates which were given to nearby Buddhist temples, and the area was used for government buildings.

== Current situation ==
Some remnants of the original stone ramparts remain, and parts of the old jōkamachi with traditional samurai houses and merchant houses remain. In 1968, a faux-donjon was built for use as a local history museum. The castle was listed as one of the Continued Top 100 Japanese Castles in 2017.

== See also ==
- Ōno Castle (Chikuzen Province)
- Ōno Castle (Chita District, Owari Province)

== Literature ==
- De Lange, William (2021). An Encyclopedia of Japanese Castles. Groningen: Toyo Press. pp. 600 pages. ISBN 978-9492722300.
- Schmorleitz, Morton S. (1974). Castles in Japan. Tokyo: Charles E. Tuttle Co. pp. 144–145. ISBN 0-8048-1102-4.
- Motoo, Hinago (1986). Japanese Castles. Tokyo: Kodansha. p. 200 pages. ISBN 0-87011-766-1.
- Mitchelhill, Jennifer (2004). Castles of the Samurai: Power and Beauty. Tokyo: Kodansha. p. 112 pages. ISBN 4-7700-2954-3.
- Turnbull, Stephen (2003). Japanese Castles 1540-1640. Osprey Publishing. p. 64 pages. ISBN 1-84176-429-9.
