= Sam Baldwin =

Sam Baldwin may refer to:

- Sam Baldwin, character in Sleepless in Seattle played by Tom Hanks
- Sam Baldwin, author of For Fukui's Sake
- Sam Baldwin, character in The Legend of Valentino
- Sam Baldwin, character in Incident In San Francisco

== See also ==
- Samuel Baldwin (disambiguation)
