= Toshitada =

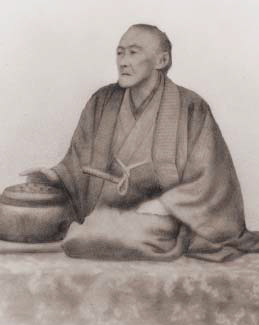
- Toshitada Doi (1811–1869), Japanese daimyo
- Pronunciation: toɕitada (IPA)
- Gender: Male

Origin
- Origin: Japanese
- Meaning: Different meanings depending on the kanji used

Other names
- Alternative spelling: Tositada (Kunrei-shiki) Tositada (Nihon-shiki) Toshitada (Hepburn)

Toshitada is a masculine Japanese given name.

== Written forms ==
Toshitada can be written using different combinations of kanji characters. Here are some examples:

- 敏忠, "agile, loyalty"
- 敏只, "agile, only"
- 敏惟, "agile, consider"
- 敏唯, "agile, only"
- 敏匡, "agile, reform"
- 俊忠, "talented, loyalty"
- 俊只, "talented, only"
- 俊惟, "talented, consider"
- 俊唯, "talented, only"
- 俊匡, "talented, reform"
- 利忠, "benefit, loyalty"
- 利只, "benefit, only"
- 利惟, "benefit, consider"
- 寿忠, "long life, loyalty"
- 寿只, "long life, only"
- 寿惟, "long life, consider"
- 年忠, "year, loyalty"
- 年只, "year, only"
- 年惟, "year, consider"

The name can also be written in hiragana としただ or katakana トシタダ.

== Notable people with the name ==
- Toshitada Doi (土井 利忠, 1811–1869), Japanese daimyo.
- Toshitada Doi (土井 利忠, born 1943), Japanese electrical engineer.
- Toshitada Yoshida (吉田 敏忠, born 1947), Japanese sport wrestler.
