= Ushigahara Station =

Railway station in Ōno, Fukui Prefecture, Japan

Ushigahara Station 牛ヶ原駅
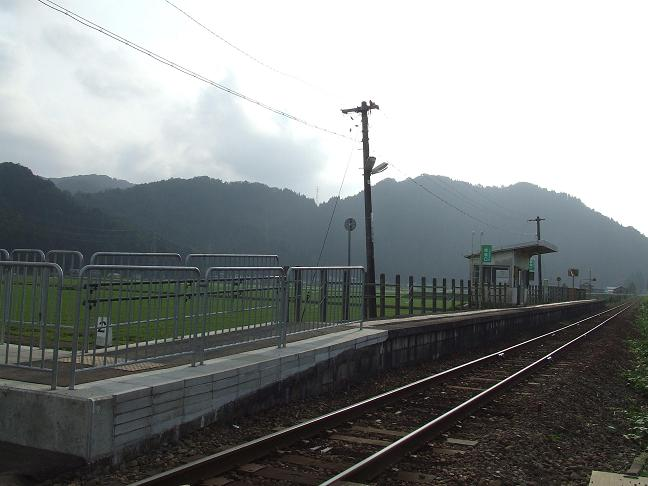
- Ushigahara Station in August 2009

General information
- Location: Ushigahara, Ōno-shi, Fukui-ken 912-0091; Japan
- Coordinates: 35°59′55″N 136°28′03″E
- Operator: JR West
- Line: ■ Etsumi-Hoku Line (Kuzuryū Line)
- Distance: 27.6 km from Echizen-Hanandō
- Platforms: 1 side platform
- Tracks: 1

Other information
- Status: Unstaffed
- Website: Official website

History
- Opened: December 15, 1960

Passengers
- FY2016: 3
Location
- Location within Japan

Ushigahara Station (牛ヶ原駅, Ushigahara-eki) is a JR West railway station in the city of Ōno, Fukui, Japan.

== Lines ==
Ushigahara Station is served by the Etsumi-Hoku Line, and is located 27.6 kilometers from the terminus of the line at Echizen-Hanandō and 30.2 kilometers from Fukui.

== Station layout ==
The station consists of one ground-level side platform serving single bi-directional track. There is no station building, but only a shelter on the platform. The station is unattended.

== Adjacent stations ==
«	Service	»
Etsumi Hoku Line
Hakariishi	Local	Kita-Ōno

== History ==
Ushigahara Station opened on December 15, 1960. With the privatization of Japanese National Railways (JNR) on 1 April 1987, the station came under the control of JR West.

== Surrounding area ==
- Ōno Castle (Echizen Province)

== See also ==
- List of railway stations in Japan
