= Izumi, Fukui =

Dissolved municipality in Fukui prefecture, Japan

Izumi (和泉村, Izumi-mura) was a village located in Ōno District, Fukui Prefecture, Japan.

As of 2003, the village had an estimated population of 701 and a density of 2.11 persons per km^{2}. The total area was 332.38 km^{2}.

On November 7, 2005, Izumi was merged into the expanded city of Ōno.
