= Ōno, Fukui =

Ōno 大野市
- City
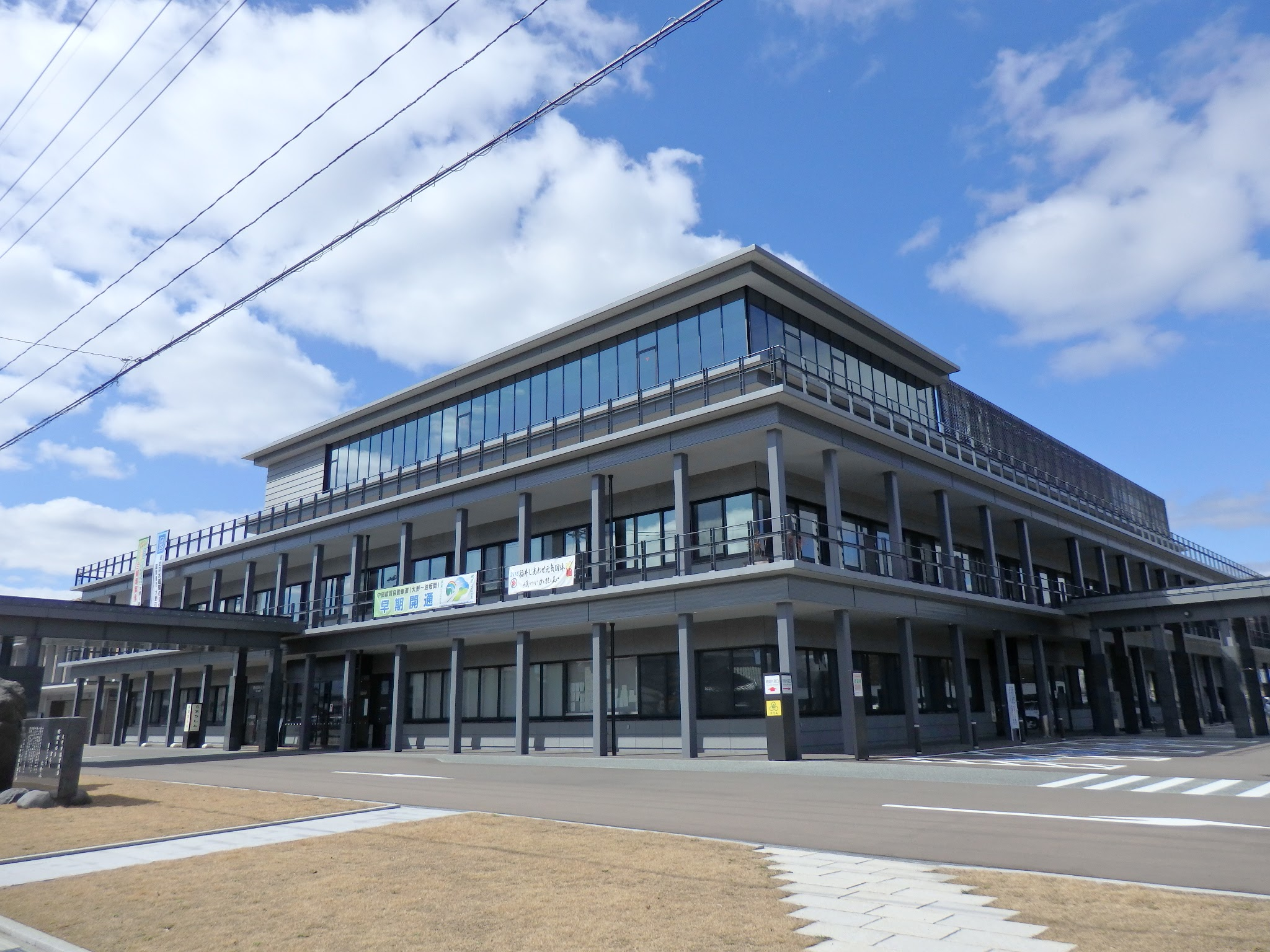
- Ōno City Hall

- Flag Emblem

- Location of Ono in Fukui Prefecture

- Coordinates: 35°58′47″N 136°29′15″E
- Country: Japan
- Region: Chūbu (Hokuriku)
- Prefecture: Fukui

Government
  - - Mayor: Shiho Ishiyama (since July 2018)

Area
  - Total: 872.43 km^{2} (336.85 sq mi)

Population (January 1, 2026)
  - Total: 29,814
  - Density: 34.174/km^{2} (88.509/sq mi)
- Time zone: UTC+9 (Japan Standard Time)
- Phone number: 0779-66-1111
- Address: 1-1 Tenjincho, Ōno-shi, Fukui-ken 912-8666
- Climate: Cfa
- Website: www.city.ono.fukui.jp
- Symbols
- Bird: Cettia diphone
- Flower: Magnolia kobus
- Tree: Fagus crenata

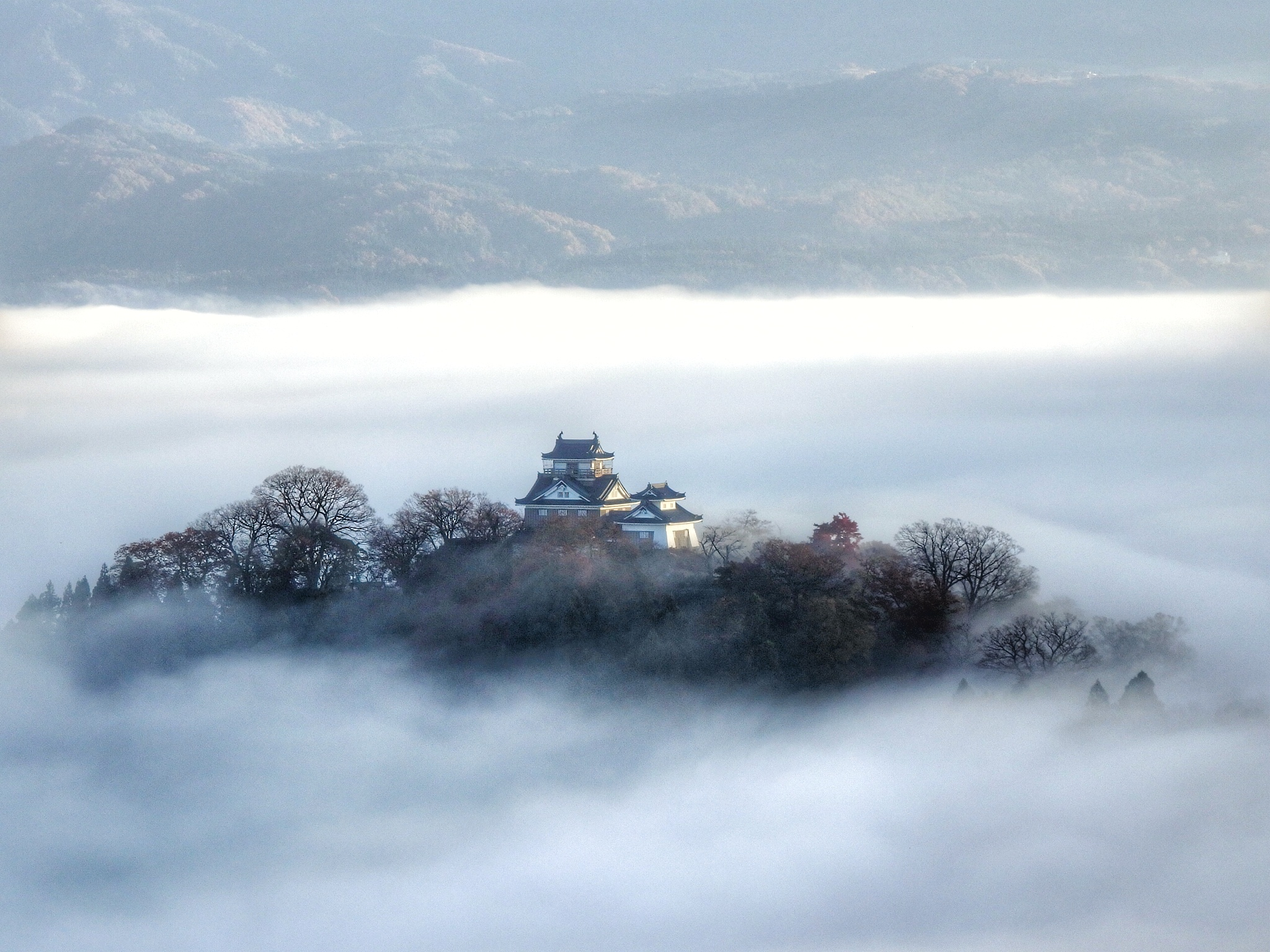
Echizen-Ōno castle

Ōno (大野市, Ōno-shi; Japanese pronunciation: [ó̞ò̞.nò̞, ò̞ó̞.nó̞.ɕì, ó̞ó̞.nó̞-]) is a city located in Fukui Prefecture, Japan. As of 1 January 2026, the city had an estimated population of 29,814 in 11,631 households and the population density of 34 persons per km^{2}. The total area of the city was 872.43 square kilometres (336.85 sq mi). The town is encircled by a ring of mountains and the only way in or out is via tunnels or mountain roads.

== Geography ==
Ōno is the largest municipality by area in Fukui Prefecture, accounting for approximately one-fifth of the prefecture's land area. The urban center retains a strong resemblance to its former castle town and is known as "Echizen's Little Kyoto". Ōno is located in mountainous northeastern Fukui Prefecture, bordered by Ishikawa Prefecture to the north and Gifu Prefecture to the east and south. The Ryōhaku Mountains stretch from east to south. The highest point is Echizen Sannomine (2,095 meters), the highest point in Fukui Prefecture. The ridge near the border between Gifu and Ishikawa prefectures reaches an elevation of over 2,000 meters. The Ōno Basin in the northwest, which runs along the downstream Mana River, is about 200 meters above sea level. The Kuzuryū River flows through the city. Parts of the city are within the borders of Hakusan National Park.

=== Neighbouring municipalities ===
Fukui Prefecture

- Fukui
- Ikeda
- Katsuyama

Gifu Prefecture

- Gujō
- Ibigawa
- Motosu
- Seki
- Takayama

Ishikawa Prefecture

- Hakusan

=== Climate ===
Ōno has a humid subtropical climate (Cfa per the Köppen climate classification system), characterized by warm, wet summers and cold winters with heavy snowfall. The average annual temperature in Ōno is 13.4 °C (56.1 °F). The average annual rainfall is 2,290.5 mm (90.18 in) with September as the wettest month. The temperatures are highest on average in August, at around 26.2 °C (79.2 °F), and lowest in January, at around 1.1 °C (34.0 °F).

Climate data for Ōno (1991−2020 normals, extremes 1976−present)
Month	Jan	Feb	Mar	Apr	May	Jun	Jul	Aug	Sep	Oct	Nov	Dec	Year
Record high °C (°F)	17.3 (63.1)	19.0 (66.2)	25.9 (78.6)	29.8 (85.6)	32.9 (91.2)	35.1 (95.2)	36.9 (98.4)	36.6 (97.9)	36.0 (96.8)	30.1 (86.2)	26.5 (79.7)	22.0 (71.6)	36.9 (98.4)
Mean daily maximum °C (°F)	4.8 (40.6)	5.9 (42.6)	10.8 (51.4)	17.6 (63.7)	22.8 (73.0)	26.0 (78.8)	29.4 (84.9)	31.1 (88.0)	27.1 (80.8)	21.2 (70.2)	14.9 (58.8)	8.0 (46.4)	18.3 (64.9)
Daily mean °C (°F)	1.1 (34.0)	1.5 (34.7)	5.5 (41.9)	11.8 (53.2)	17.4 (63.3)	21.3 (70.3)	25.1 (77.2)	26.2 (79.2)	22.1 (71.8)	15.9 (60.6)	9.7 (49.5)	3.9 (39.0)	13.5 (56.2)
Mean daily minimum °C (°F)	−2.3 (27.9)	−2.6 (27.3)	0.6 (33.1)	6.1 (43.0)	12.3 (54.1)	17.3 (63.1)	21.5 (70.7)	22.3 (72.1)	18.0 (64.4)	11.2 (52.2)	5.1 (41.2)	0.4 (32.7)	9.2 (48.5)
Record low °C (°F)	−15.8 (3.6)	−14.5 (5.9)	−10.1 (13.8)	−3.3 (26.1)	1.2 (34.2)	8.3 (46.9)	13.4 (56.1)	13.4 (56.1)	6.5 (43.7)	−0.5 (31.1)	−3.3 (26.1)	−15.4 (4.3)	−15.8 (3.6)
Average precipitation mm (inches)	249.7 (9.83)	163.2 (6.43)	161.1 (6.34)	142.6 (5.61)	144.8 (5.70)	168.3 (6.63)	274.4 (10.80)	183.9 (7.24)	195.5 (7.70)	151.9 (5.98)	181.1 (7.13)	274.1 (10.79)	2,290.5 (90.18)
Average snowfall cm (inches)	190 (75)	139 (55)	45 (18)	2 (0.8)	0 (0)	0 (0)	0 (0)	0 (0)	0 (0)	0 (0)	3 (1.2)	89 (35)	458 (180)
Average precipitation days (≥ 1.0 mm)	21.5	17.0	15.5	12.8	11.6	11.5	13.4	9.9	11.7	11.7	15.2	20.7	172.5
Average snowy days (≥ 3 cm)	16.6	13.5	5.1	0.2	0	0	0	0	0	0	0.4	7.7	43.5
Mean monthly sunshine hours	61.5	81.2	124.3	162.7	188.2	141.1	139.1	183.8	135.2	139.4	105.1	68.0	1,525.7
Source: Japan Meteorological Agency

== Demographics ==
Per Japanese census data, the population of Ōno has declined over the past 50 years.

Historical population
Year	Pop.	±%
1970	44,694	—
1980	43,379	−2.9%
1990	41,837	−3.6%
2000	39,632	−5.3%
2010	35,291	−11.0%
2020	31,286	−11.3%

== History ==
Ōno is part of ancient Echizen Province. Ōno Castle was built during the Sengoku period by Kanamori Nagachika. During the Edo period, Ōno developed as the castle town of Ōno Domain, which was also a noted center for rangaku studies. Following the Meiji restoration, it was organised into part of Ōno District in Fukui Prefecture. Much of the old town of Ōno was destroyed in a fire on April 8, 1888. With the establishment of the modern municipalities system on April 1, 1889. the town of Ōno was established. Ōno merged with the villages of Shimosho, Kamisho, Goka, Sakadani, Tomida, Inuigawa and Oyama and was raised to city status on July 1, 1954. Ōno annexed the neighbouring village of Nishitani on July 1, 1970. On November 7, 2005, the village of Izumi was merged into Ōno. Ōno and the surroundings were the setting for the 2011 non-fiction book For Fukui's Sake, written by a British author who resided there for two years.

== Government ==
Ōno has a mayor-council form of government with a directly elected mayor and a unicameral city legislature of 16 members. Katsuyama contributes two members to the Fukui Prefectural Assembly. In terms of national politics, the city is part of the Fukui 1st district of the lower house of the Diet of Japan.

== Economy ==
The economy of Ōno is mixed, with agriculture, forestry and seasonal tourism playing prominent roles. Taro is a major local product.

== Education ==
Ōno has seven public elementary schools and two middle schools operated by the city government, and two public high schools operated by the Fukui Prefectural Board of Education.

== Transportation ==
=== Railway ===
JR West - Etsumi-Hoku Line

- Ushigahara - Kita-Ōno - Echizen-Ōno - Echizen-Tano - Echizen-Tomida - Shimoyuino - Kakigashima - Kadohara - Echizen-Shimoyama - Kuzuryūko

=== Highway ===
- Chūbu-Jūkan Expressway
- National Route 157
- National Route 158
- National Route 364
- National Route 418
- National Route 476

== International relations ==
- Ningbo, Zhejiang, China, friendship city

== Local attractions ==
- Hakusan National Park
- Ōno Castle (Echizen Province)
- Hōkyō-ji
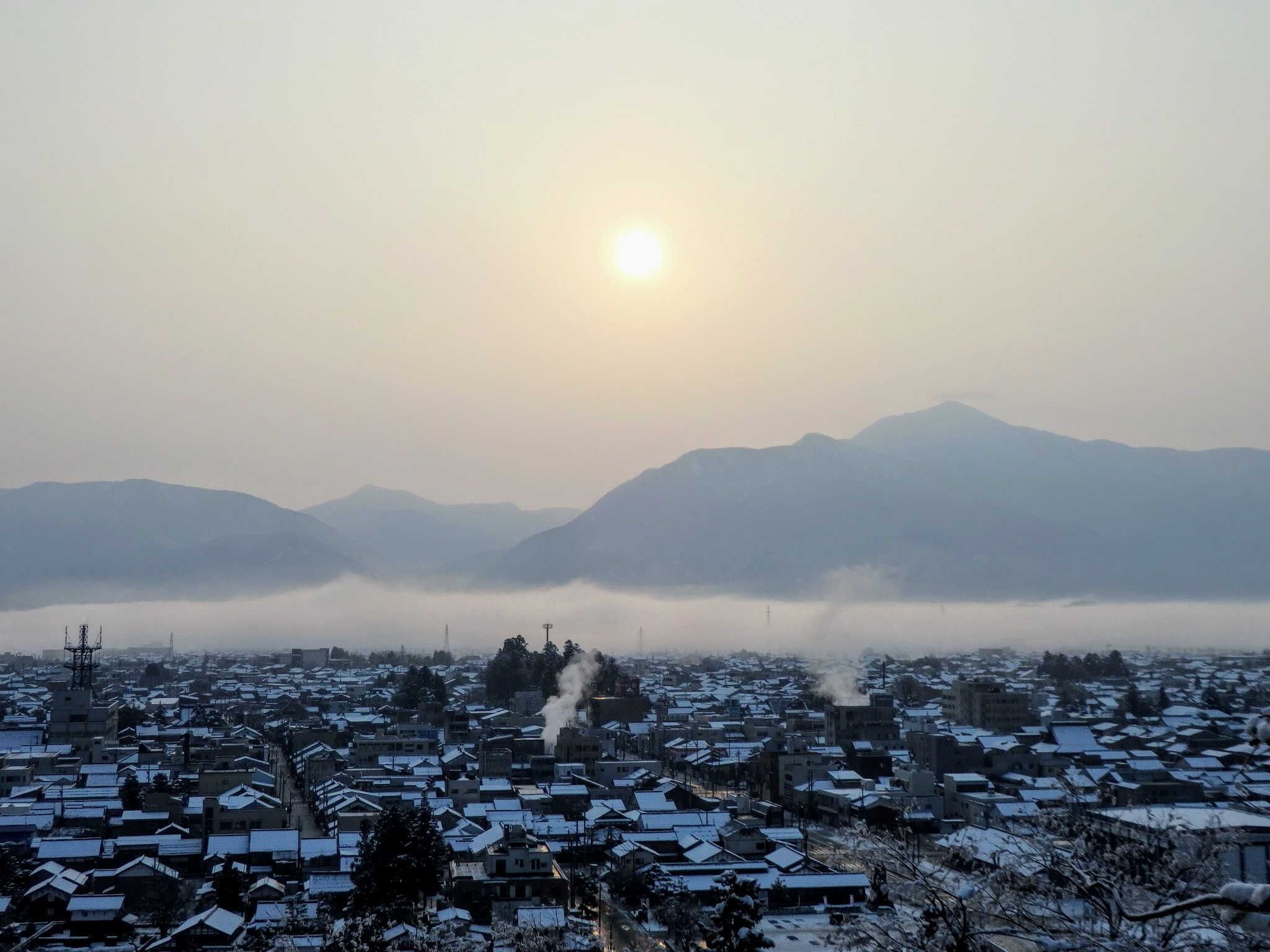
View from Ōno Castle

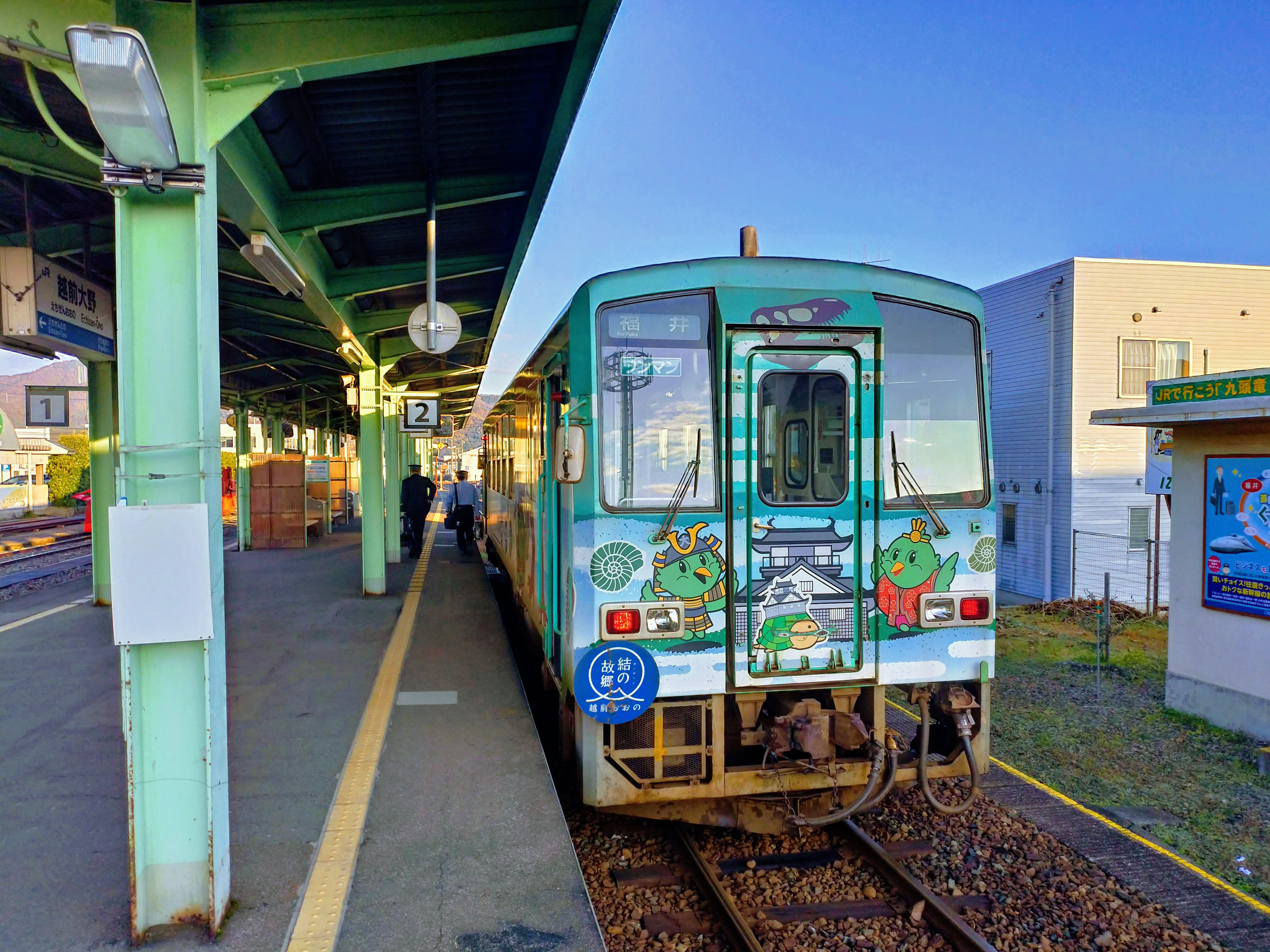
Ōno Station

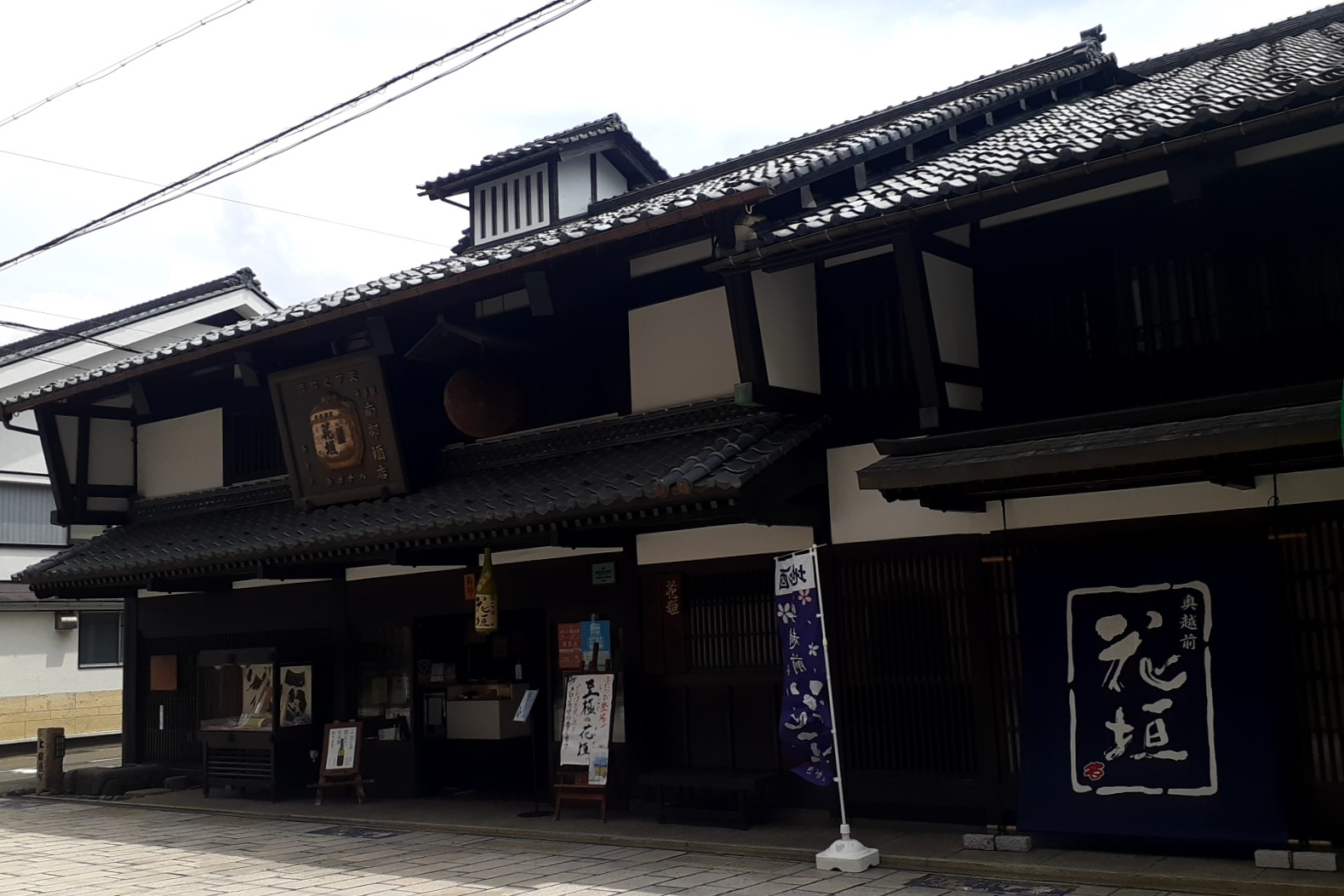
Nanbu Shuzo sake brewery

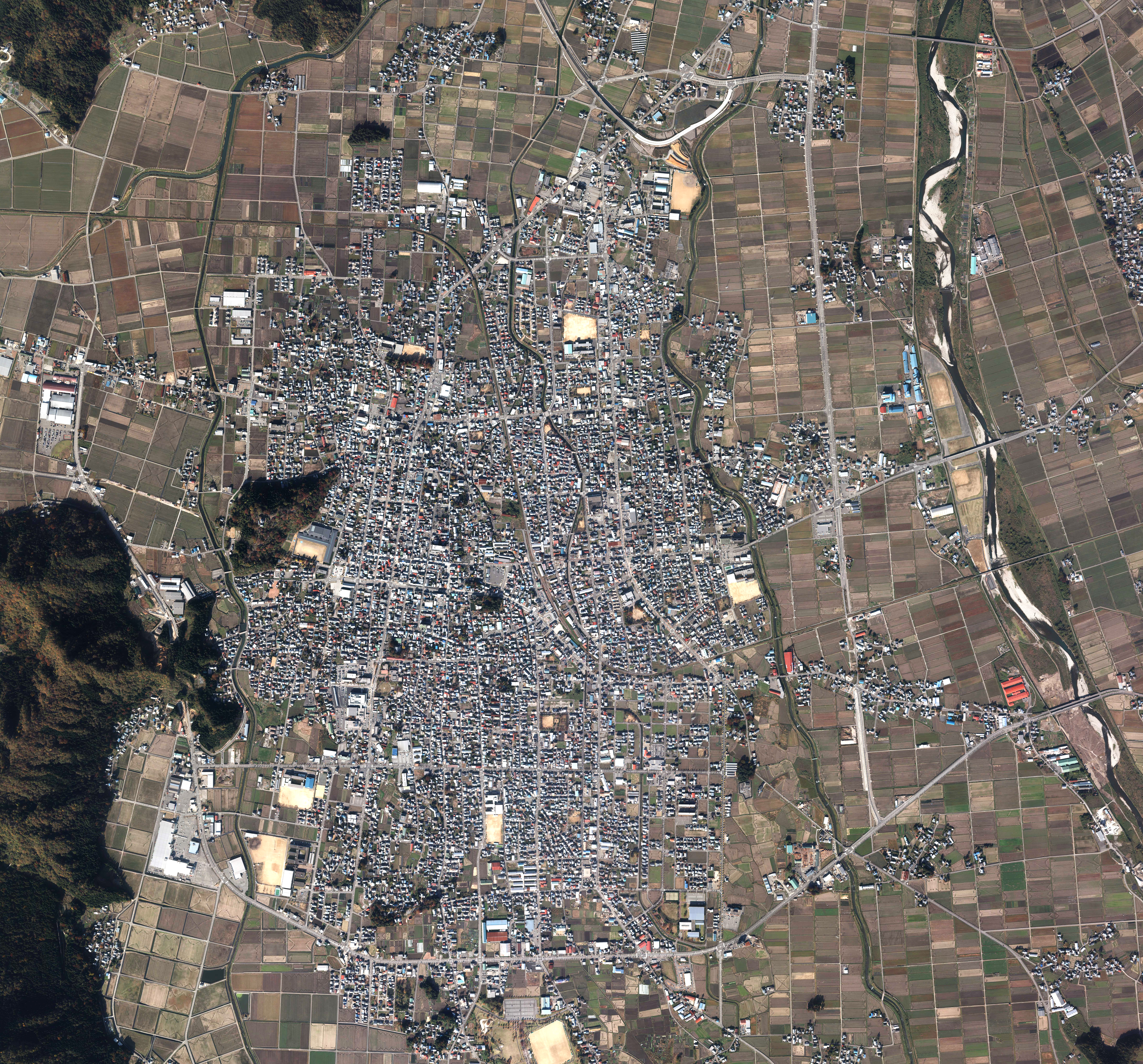
Aerial photograph of central Ōno
