= Ōno Goten =

- 大野御殿 (Japanese)
- Interactive map of Ōno Goten
- 34.9341°N 136.8260°E
- Location: Ōno-chō 6-chōme, Ōnomachi, Tokoname, Japan

History
- Built: 1659
- Built for: Tokugawa Mitsutomo
- Demolished: 19th century

Site notes
- Architectural style: Edo-period residential palace

Ōno Goten (大野御殿) was a historical palace-like residence (goten) located in Ōno, Aichi, part of present-day Tokoname, Japan. It functioned as an official lodging facility during the Edo period of the Owari Tokugawa family.

== History ==
The area was historically associated with Ōno Castle (大野城), a hilltop fortress overlooking Ise Bay. Ōno Castle served as the residence of the Saji clan and played a strategic role in controlling maritime routes in Ise Bay. The surrounding castle town developed as a regional center.

The goten in Ōno originated in 1659, when the residence of the Hirano family, who served as village headmen (shōya) in Ōno, was expanded to serve as an accommodation for Tokugawa Mitsutomo, the second lord of the Owari Domain, during his regional inspection tours.

The building functioned as an official lodging facility for high-ranking figures traveling within the domain. Such facilities were part of the administrative infrastructure supporting feudal governance and movement during the Edo period. The cooling breeze from the ocean made Ōno a particular popular destination during the hot summers.

Historical records indicate that the palace continued to exist until the Tenpō era (1830–1844), after which it disappeared.

== Current status ==
No physical remains of the goten survive. The site has been redeveloped and is now occupied by public facilities and open spaces. Local descriptions suggest that the approximate site corresponds to the area around present-day community buildings Children Centre, the Minami Community Centre, and the park next to the west.

== See also ==
- List of Owari Tokugawa residences
- Honjin
