= Samuel Baldwin =

Samuel Baldwin (or similar) may refer to:

- Samuel Baldwyn (1618–1683), English lawyer and politician
- Samuel Baldwin (New York politician), in 50th New York State Legislature
- Samuel Baldwin (magician), (1848–1924), American magician known as "The White Mahatma"

== See also ==
- Sam Baldwin (disambiguation)
