= Kita-Ōno Station =

Railway station in Ōno, Fukui Prefecture, Japan

Kita-Ōno Station 北大野駅
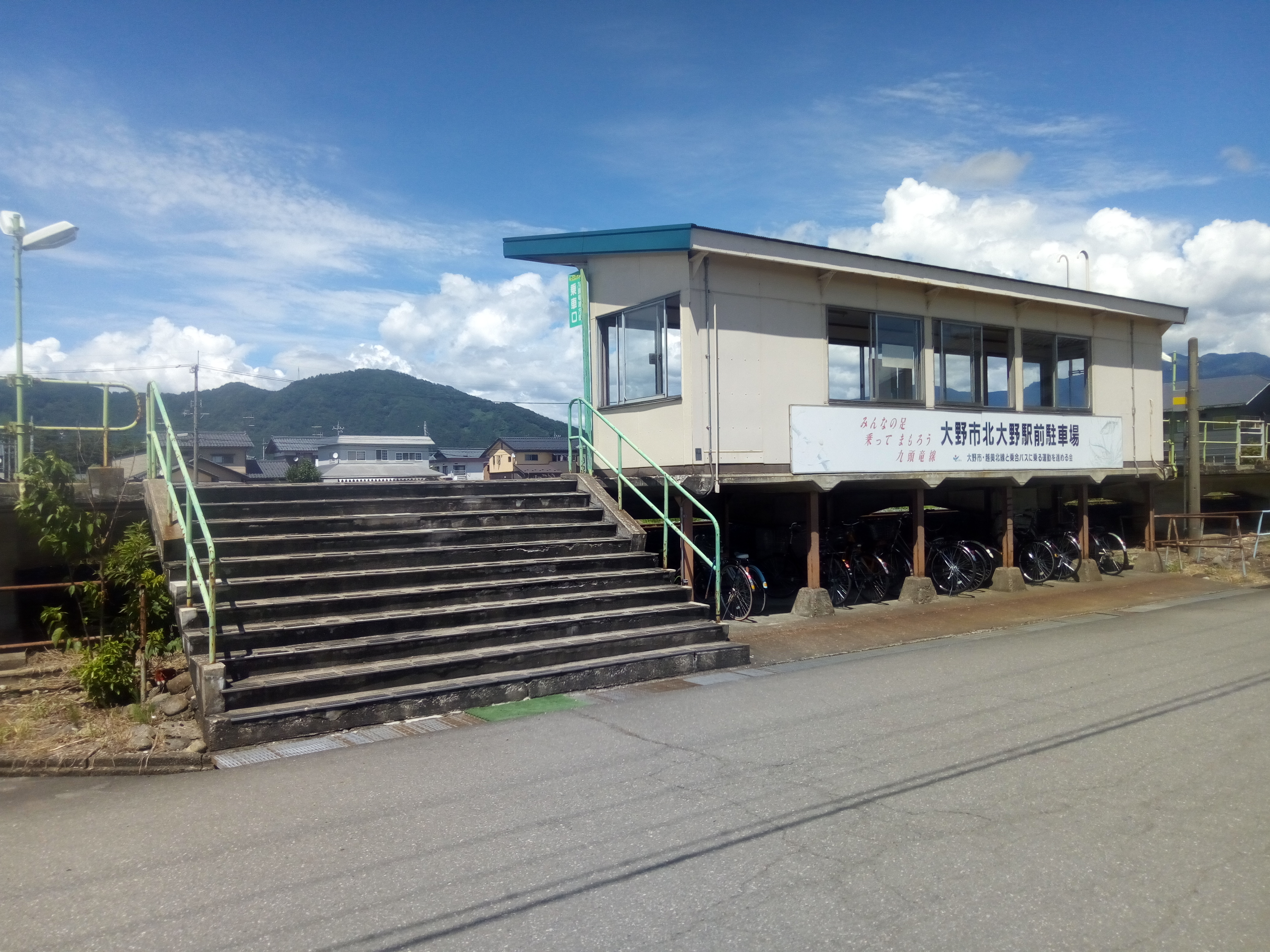
- Kita-Ōno Station in August 2017

General information
- Location: Nakano, Ōno-shi, Fukui-ken 912-0021; Japan
- Coordinates: 35°59′53″N 136°29′17″E
- Operator: JR West
- Line: ■ Etsumi-Hoku Line (Kuzuryū Line)
- Distance: 29.4 km from Echizen-Hanandō
- Platforms: 1 side platform
- Tracks: 1

Other information
- Status: Unstaffed
- Website: Official website

History
- Opened: March 25, 1968
Location
- Location within Japan

Kita-Ōno Station (北大野駅, Kita-Ōno-eki) is a JR West railway station in the city of Ōno, Fukui, Japan.

== Lines ==
Kita-Ōno Station is served by the Etsumi-Hoku Line, and is located 29.4 kilometers from the terminus of the line at Echizen-Hanandō and 32.0 kilometers from Fukui.

== Station layout ==
The station consists of one ground-level side platform serving single bi-directional track. There is no station building, but only a shelter on the platform. The station is unattended.

== Adjacent stations ==
«	Service	»
Etsumi Hoku Line
Echizen-Ōno	Local	Ushigahara

== History ==
Kita-Ōno Station opened on March 25, 1968. With the privatization of Japanese National Railways (JNR) on 1 April 1987, the station came under the control of JR West.

== Surrounding area ==
- Ōno Higashi High School
- Shimosho Elementary School
- Yomei Junior High School

== See also ==
- List of railway stations in Japan
