= Ōno, Aichi =

Dissolved municipality in Aichi prefecture, Japan

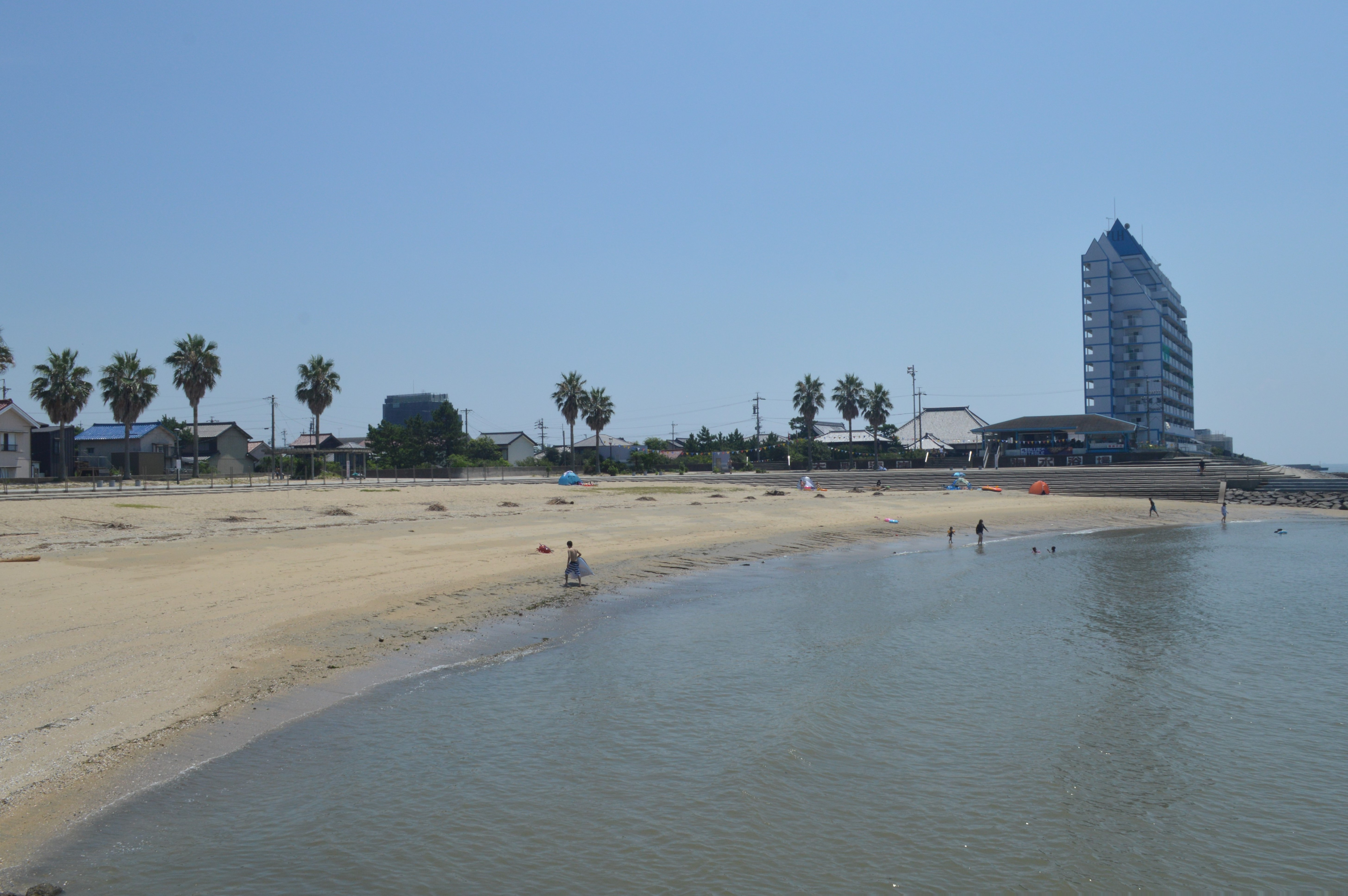
Beach at Ōno overlooking Ise Bay

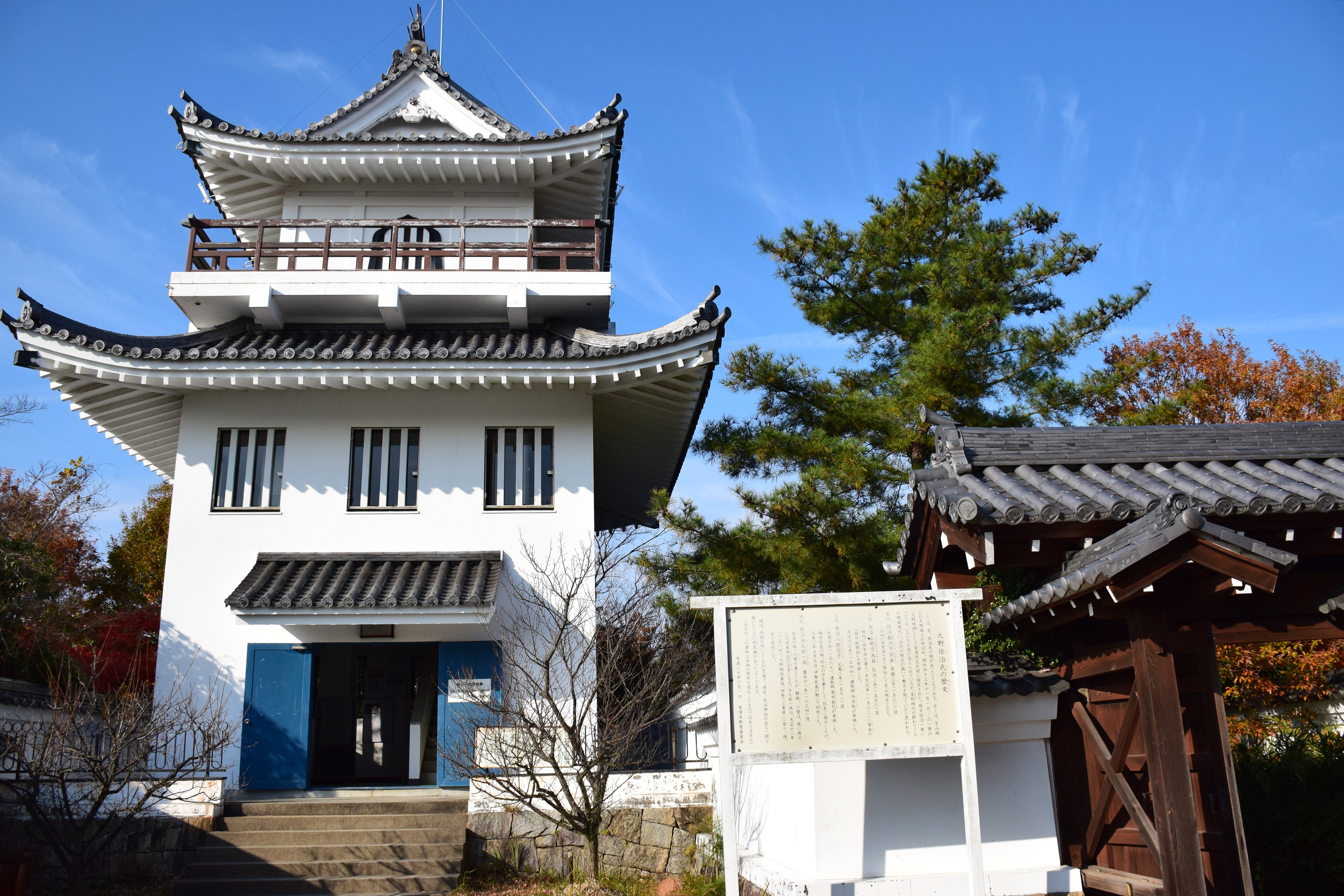
Ōno Castle

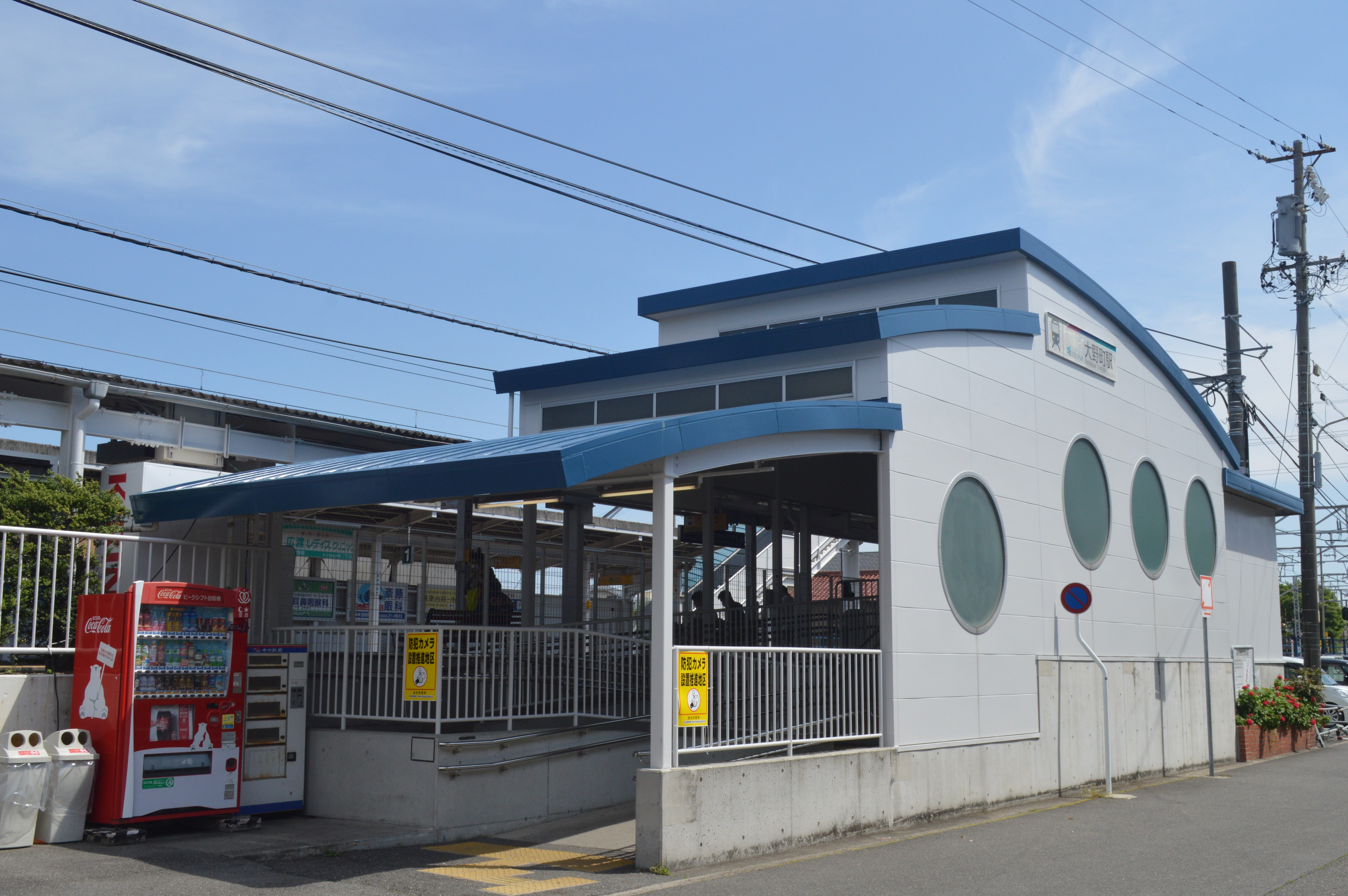
Ōnomachi Station

Ōno (大野町, Ōno-machi) was a town located in Chita District, Aichi, central Japan.

== History ==
During the Edo period, rice granaries lined the river on both sides that lead downstream to the port on Ise Bay. Starting with the Meiji period and industrialization, Ōno Beach became a popular point during the summer, with a number of villas being constructed for the wealthy. The Owari Tokugawa family had the goten there.

On April 1, 1954 the city of Tokoname was established by the merger of the towns of Tokoname, Ōno, Onizaki and Nishiura and the village of Sanwa.

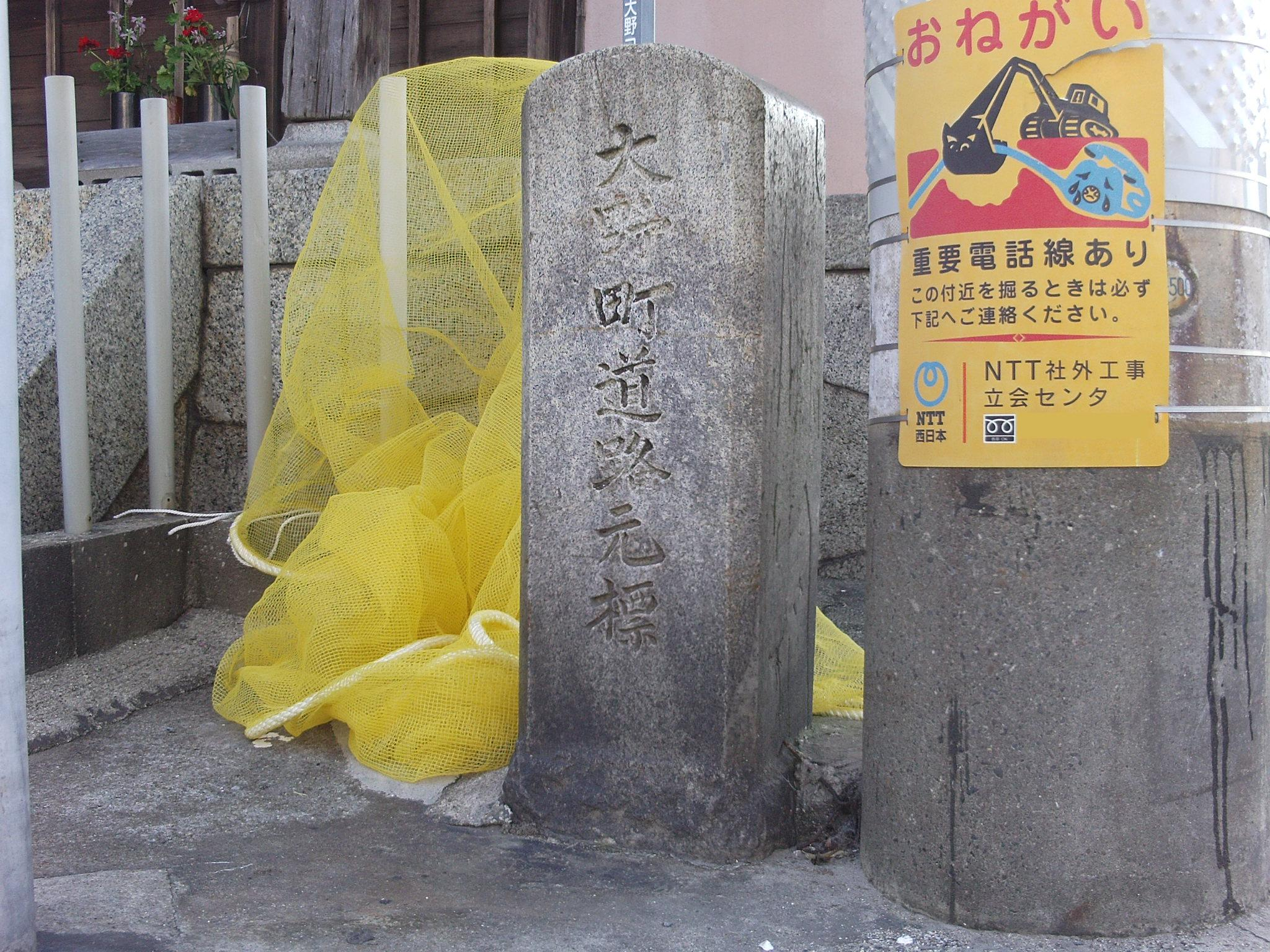
The Kilometre Zero of Ōno

== Attractions ==
Ōno Castle is located close to the town.

Ōno Bridge is located in the centre of the town. Dokan-ya is a traditional shop close by at the river.

Kaion-ji (海音寺) is a Buddhist temple and one of the largest ones in the town. It used to be located directly at the waterfront. Another important temple is Sainen-ji (斉年寺).

== Transportation ==
Ōnomachi Station is served by the Meitetsu Tokoname Line. It was originally opened in 1912.
