= For Fukui's Sake =

For Fukui's Sake: Two years in rural Japan
- Cover
- Author: Sam Baldwin
- Cover artist: James Ferguson
- Language: English
- Genre: Travel
- Publisher: Baka Books
- Publication date: First published 2011 on Kindle, then 2012 in paperback
- ISBN: 1467924148

For Fukui's Sake is a 2011 travel book by Sam Baldwin that describes the experiences of living in Ono, Fukui prefecture, Japan, whilst working as an Assistant Language Teacher (ALT) on the JET Programme.

== Synopsis ==
The account features both the positive and negative aspects of life as an foreigner in a small Japanese community, and focuses on the local characters, places and wildlife in and around Fukui prefecture, a largely rural area of Japan. The book also includes chapters on the Fuji Rock Festival, climbing Mount Fuji and Mount Haku, impressions of Tokyo and Hokkaido, as well as details of teaching at a Japanese Junior High School.

== Reception ==
Skyscanner gave a positive review of For Fukui's Sake, saying that Baldwin "expertly captures what it feels like to be a foreigner in a strange land". ABTA Magazine called it an "adventurous and humorous insight in to the Japanese countryside." Scotcampus Magazine described it as "a quirky autobiographical account of an area so far removed from life [...] you'll scarcely believe it exists.". The Art of Japan Kanazawa commented that it was an "honest and very entertaining memoir" that "avoid[s] many of the stereotypes that often plague such chronicles [and] deftly straddles the line between subjective and objective reporting.".
