= Ōno District, Fukui =

Former district in Fukui prefecture, Japan

Ōno (大野郡, Ōno-gun) was a district located in Fukui Prefecture, Japan.

As of 2003, the district had an estimated population of 701 with a density of 2.11 persons per km^{2}. The total area was 332.38 km^{2}.

== Municipalities ==
Prior to its dissolution, the district consisted of only one village:

- Izumi (Note: Classified as a village.)

== History ==
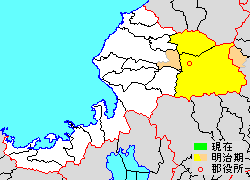
Map showing original extent of Ōno District in Fukui Prefecture: * yellow - areas formerly within the district borders during the early Meiji period

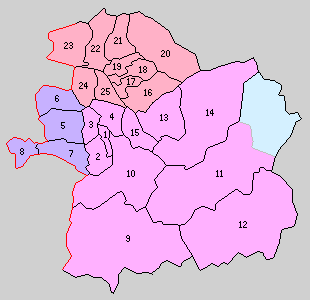
Colored areas are in this district.

=== Recent mergers ===
- On November 7, 2005 - The village of Izumi was merged into the expanded city of Ōno. Ōno District was dissolved as a result of this merger.

== See also ==
- List of dissolved districts of Japan
