= Ōno Castle (Chita District, Owari Province) =

Coordinates: 34°55′43″N 136°50′01″E

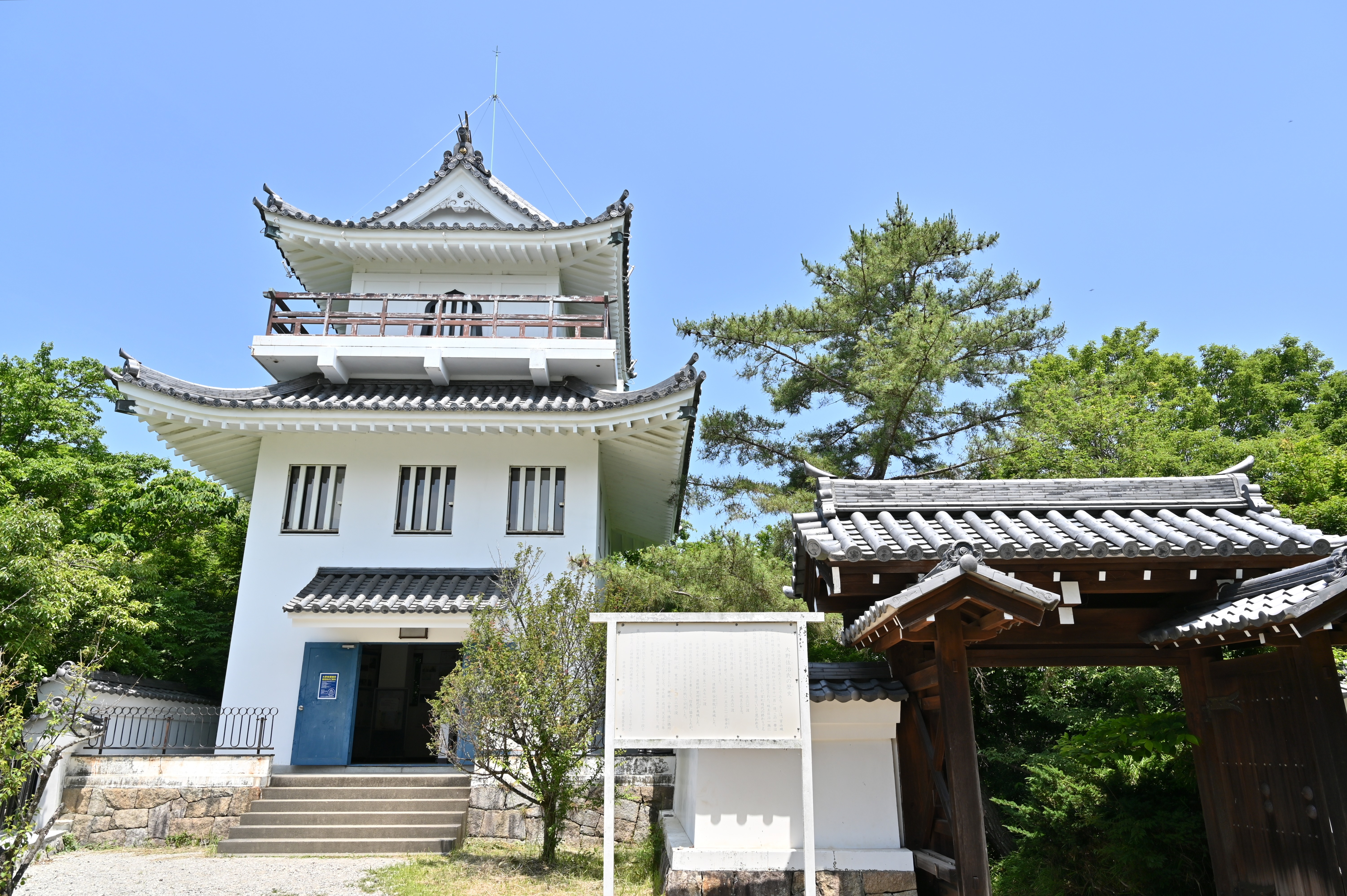
Ōno Castle in the Chita District of Owari Province

Ōno Castle (大野城, Ōno-jō) is a Japanese castle located in Ōno, Chita District, Aichi, former Owari Province. It is also known as Miyayama Castle (宮山城).

The area is since 1954 a part of the town of Tokoname in Aichi Prefecture.

== See also ==
- Ōno Goten
