= Doi Toshitada =

Doi Toshitada 土井利忠
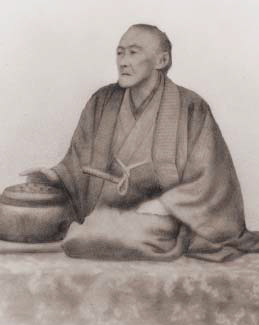
- Born: May 24, 1811
- Died: January 15, 1869 (aged 57)
- Occupation: Daimyō of Ōno Domain (1818-1862)
- Father: Doi Toshinori

Doi Toshitada (土井利忠; May 24, 1811 – January 15, 1869) was the 7th Doi daimyō of Ōno Domain in Echizen Province, Honshū, Japan (modern-day Fukui Prefecture). Before the Meiji Restoration, his courtesy title was Noto-no-kami, and his Court rank was Junior Fifth Rank, Lower Grade.

== Biography ==
Do Toshitada was the only son of the 5th daimyō of Ōno, Doi Toshinori, and was born in Edo after his father had retired and had turned the domain over to Doi Toshikata. Soon after his gempuku ceremony in 1818, Toshikata died without heir and Toshitada inherited the position of daimyō. Due to his youth, he remained in Edo until 1829 and the domain was administered by its senior retainers.

Toshitada first visited Ōno in 1829, and (as with most of the feudal domains in Japan at the time), found that the domain finances were in serious difficulties. He immediately began a reform program to boost production of local products, establish monopolies on trade, and to take over control of a local copper mine. However, as these efforts took time to have any effect, in 1842 he issued a severely worded proclamation stressing fiscal frugality and condemning corruption and replacing complacent or inefficient officials.

In 1844, he established a han school modelled after the Tekijuku in Osaka, with a strong emphasis on rangaku teachings of western medicine and industrial science. The school became famous, and also attracted students from outside the domain.

From 1845, he began to reform the domain's military according to the teachings of Takashima Shūhan, purchasing western firearms and cannon. He redoubled these efforts after the Perry Expedition of 1853, ordering that his samurai abandon their obsolete spears and arrows for rifles.

Toshitada also established a nationwide network of shops called Ōno-ya (大野屋). These shops sold local products from Ōno and purchases products in demand by the domain as part of the domain's trade monopoly and also lent money; however, they were also a front for an intelligence-gathering operation run by the domain. In 1855, branches of the Ōno-ya were located in Osaka, Hakodate, Gifu, Nagoya and many other locations.

After 1855, the Tokugawa shogunate became increasing concerned about the expansionist policies of the Russian Empire and its encroachment on Japan's northern frontiers. Many domains were ordered to station forces in Ezo (Hokkaido) to deter Russian aggression. Ōno Domain already had a presence in Oshima Peninsula; however, Toshitada petitioned to be allowed to develop the remote island of "Kita-Ezo" (Karafuto) to the north of Hokkaido. Permission was granted in 1858, and despite its landlocked location, the domain built a two-masted sailing ship, the Ōno Maru, which was based out of Tsuruga port. However, the venture proved very difficult due to the island's remoteness and inclement climate, and the unsettled conditions of the Bakumatsu period. The project was abandoned in 1864 after the accidental sinking of the Ōno Maru.

Toshitada retired in 1862, citing illness, and died in 1869.

Preceded by Doi Toshikata	9th Daimyo of Ōno; 1811-1862	Succeeded by Doi Toshitsune
