= Aoki Kazunori =

Japanese samurai

- Born: Unknown, possibly 1541
- Died: Keichō 5, 6th day of the 10th month (November 11, 1600 (aged 58–59)) or Keichō 5, 10th day of the 10th month (November 15, 1600 (aged 58–59))
- Buried: Former Nashoin Temple, Higashiyama
- Era: Azuchi–Momoyama
- Rank: Junior Chamberlain, 5th rank

Aoki Kazunori (青木 一矩; 1541 – November 11, 1600) was a Japanese samurai of the Azuchi-Momoyama period who served the Toyotomi clan. He survived the Battle of Sekigahara but died shortly afterwards of an illness.
